= U.S. Route 77 in Nebraska =

Section of U.S. Highway in Nebraska, United States

U.S. Highway 77
- Homestead Expressway
- US 77 highlighted in red

Route information
- Maintained by NDOT
- Length: 189.88 mi (305.58 km)
- Existed: 1926–present

Major junctions
- South end: US-77 at the Kansas state line near Barneston
- US 136 / N-4 in Beatrice; US 6 in Lincoln; I-80 in Lincoln; I-180 / US 34 in Lincoln; N-92 in Wahoo; US 30 / US 275 in Fremont; US 75 in Winnebago; I-129 / US 75 / US 20 in South Sioux City
- North end: US 77 at the Iowa state line in Sioux City, IA

Location
- Country: United States
- State: Nebraska
- Counties: Gage, Lancaster, Saunders, Dodge, Burt, Thurston, Dakota

Highway system
- United States Numbered Highway System; List; Special; Divided; Nebraska State Highway System; Interstate; US; State; Link; Spur; State Spurs; Recreation
← I-76	→ N-78

U.S. Highway 77 (US 77) in the state of Nebraska runs south–north across the eastern portion of the state, emerging from Kansas in Gage County south of Wymore, and ending in Dakota County north of South Sioux City, before making a brief entrance into Iowa.

== Route description ==
In Nebraska, US 77 is a major north–south artery connecting the capital city of Lincoln with outlying areas to the north and south. The highway is designated as the Homestead Expressway from Beatrice to Interstate 80 (I-80) at Lincoln. In Lincoln, US 77 becomes a full controlled-access expressway before it overlaps with I-80 for about 8 miles. North of I-80, US 77 continues as an expressway to Wahoo, where it becomes a two-lane undivided road. It remains a two-lane highway except for two sections near Fremont, which are four-lane divided highways. The expressway north of Fremont is shared with US 275 and Nebraska Highway 91 (N-91). US 275 and N-91 separate from US 77 just south of Winslow, Nebraska and US 77 continues north as a two-lane highway until it meets U.S. Route 75 at Winnebago. The two highways run together to the junction of I-129 and US 20 at Dakota City, where US 75 breaks off and US 77 continues northward as a divided highway through South Sioux City before exiting the state via the Siouxland Veterans Memorial Bridge. The national end of US 77 lies four-tenths mile (640 m) on the other side of the bridge, at an interchange with I-29 in Sioux City, Iowa.

== Major intersections ==
County	Location	mi	km	Exit	Destinations	Notes
Gage	Barneston Township	0.00	0.00		US-77 south – Marysville	Continuation into Kansas
Gage	Barneston Township	3.03	4.88		N-8 – Pawnee City, Fairbury	
Gage	Sicily Township	13.32	21.44		L-34H to N-112 – Odell	
Gage	Sicily Township	13.62	21.92		N-112 south – Odell	No turns from northbound lane
Gage	Beatrice	22.23	35.78		US 136 / N-4 (Court Street) – Business Center	
Gage	Holt Township	30.06	48.38		S-34D – Pickrell	
Gage	Highland Township	36.07	58.05		N-41 west – Clatonia, Wilber	Southern end of N-41 concurrency
Gage	Highland Township	37.57	60.46		N-41 east – Adams	Northern end of N-41 concurrency
Lancaster	Buda Precinct	42.56	68.49		S-55H – Hallam	
Lancaster	Centerville Precinct	48.63	78.26		S-55G – Hickman	
Lancaster	Centerville Precinct	50.64	81.50		N-33 west / S-55F east – Roca, Crete	Interchange; eastern terminus of N-33; western terminus of S-55F
Lancaster		53.80	86.58		N-2 east – Nebraska City	Interchange; western terminus of N-2
Lancaster		53.90	86.74		Saltillo Road	Interchange
Lancaster	Lincoln	57.11	91.91		To S. 14th Street / Warlick Road / Denton Road	Partial interchange; northbound exit; all other movements via at-grade intersection; access via Warlick Road (former US 77 north); future diamond interchange; future southern end of freeway section
Lancaster	Lincoln	58.11	93.52	—	Pioneers Boulevard	Current at-grade intersection; future diamond interchange with roundabouts
Lancaster	Lincoln	60.08	96.69	—	Van Dorn Street	Single point urban interchange; former alignment of N-2; southern end of freeway section
Lancaster	Lincoln	61.48	98.94	—	Rosa Parks Way	Single point urban interchange
Lancaster	Lincoln	62.46	100.52	—	US 6 (O Street)	Diamond interchange
Lancaster	Lincoln	62.74	100.97	—	I-80 west – Grand Island	Southern end of I-80 concurrency; I-80 exit 397
Lancaster	Lincoln	64.48	103.77	399	Cornhusker Highway – Lincoln Airport	Exit numbers follow I-80
Lancaster	Lincoln	66.49– 66.49	107.01– 107.01	401	I-180 south / US 34 / 9th Street – Downtown	Northbound exits signed as 401A (south/east) and 401B (west)
Lancaster	Lincoln	68.95	110.96	403	27th Street	
Lancaster	Lincoln	71.22	114.62	—	I-80 east / L-55X south (56th Street) to US 6 – Omaha	Northern end of I-80 concurrency; northern end of freeway section; I-80 exit 405; L-55X is former US 77 south
Lancaster	Rock Creek Precinct	77.44	124.63		S-55E – Davey	
Saunders	Stocking Township	88.65	142.67		N-66 east – Ithaca, Ashland	
Saunders	Stocking Township	92.74	149.25		N-92 west – Grand Island	Southern end of N-92 concurrency
Saunders	Wahoo	96.15	154.74		N-109 north – Colon	
Saunders	Mead	101.36	163.12		N-92 – Omaha	Northern end of N-92 concurrency
Saunders	Marietta Township–Pohocco Township line	106.38	171.20		N-64 east – Leshara, Valley	
Saunders	Pohocco Township	112.34	180.79		N-109 west – Cedar Bluffs	
Dodge	Elkhorn Township	116.44	187.39		US 275 east (West Dodge Expressway east) / Old Highway 8	Interchange with US 275, roundabout with Old Hwy. 8; southern end of US 275 overlap
Dodge	Fremont	117.56	189.19	—	Morningside Road	
Dodge	Fremont	118.54	190.77	—	Military Avenue – Historic Downtown	
Dodge	Fremont	119.14	191.74	—	US 30 east (Lincoln Highway) – Fremont, Blair	Eastern end of US 30 overlap; western end of West Dodge Expressway
Dodge	Fremont	118.09– 118.11	190.05– 190.08		US 30 west – Columbus	Interchange; western end of US 30 overlap
Dodge	Nickerson Township	121.90	196.18		N-91 east – Nickerson	Southern end of N-91 concurrency
Dodge	Hooper Township	125.75	202.38		US 275 / N-91 west – Norfolk	Interchange; northern end of US 275/N-91 concurrency; northbound left exit and southbound left entrance only
Burt	Oakland	142.48	229.30		N-32 – West Point, Tekamah	
Burt	Everett Township–Logan Township line	154.85	249.21		N-51 – Bancroft, Decatur	
Thurston	Dawes Township	158.84	255.63		S-87B – Rosalie	
Thurston	Walthill	164.99	265.53		N-94	
Thurston	Winnebago	170.78	274.84		US 75 south – Omaha	Roundabout; southern end of US 75 concurrency; former US 73 south
Dakota	Dakota City	184.40	296.76		N-35 – Wayne	
Dakota	Covington Precinct	186.74	300.53		US 75 north / I-129 / US 20 – Iowa	Cloverleaf interchange; northern end of US 75 concurrency; I-129 exit 1
Dakota	South Sioux City	189.42	304.84		US 20 Bus. west (Dakota Avenue south)	Southern end of US 20 Bus. concurrency
Missouri River		189.88	305.58		Siouxland Veterans Memorial Bridge; Nebraska–Iowa line	
Missouri River		189.88	305.58		US 77 north (US 20 Bus. east) to I-29	Continuation into Sioux City, Iowa
1.000 mi = 1.609 km; 1.000 km = 0.621 mi: Concurrency terminus; Incomplete access; Unopened

== See also ==
- List of U.S. Highways in Nebraska

U.S. Route 77
Previous state: Kansas	Nebraska	Next state: Iowa
