= Otoe Reservation =

Former tract of land granted to the Otoe people

The Otoe Reservation was a twenty-four square-mile section straddling the Kansas-Nebraska state line. The majority of the reservation sat in modern-day southeast Jefferson County, Nebraska.

As early as 1834, the Otoe relinquished land to the government in fulfillment of a treaty. It extended two miles (3 km) south of the state line its full length, into Washington and Marshall counties, Kansas. In Nebraska it extended into Jefferson County, which was earlier called Jones County, and Gage County. Altogether it comprised 250 sections totaling 160,000 acres (650 km^{2}). The Glenwood, Paddock, Liberty Township and Barneston Townships are wholly within the historic boundaries of the reservation. It also included sections of the Elm, Sicily, Wymore, and Island Grove Townships.

Although the Otoe were originally located throughout southeastern Nebraska, their main town was once located along the Platte River near present-day Plattsmouth in the eastern part of the state. The Moses Merrill Mission was located in this area. When the Nebraska Territory was formed in 1854, the Otoe resigned their remaining land claim with the exception of a section near the Big Blue River. This became the Otoe Reservation.

In 1879, a new treaty with the federal government gave it the legal control to allow the Otoe to sell the reservation for tribal annuities, and relocate to "Indian country", Oklahoma. In the fall of 1882, the rest of the tribe moved to Red Rock, Oklahoma, the reservation was disbanded, and the "undeveloped" land was put for sale. The few remaining Otoes were of mixed background and quickly integrated with the new settlers, most notably the Barnes's of French and Otoe background.

On May 31, 1883, 50,000 acres (200 km^{2}) of the Oto and Missouri Indian Reservation in Kansas and Nebraska were opened for settlement at a public sale. When the Otoe were removed, the southeast corner of Jefferson County was opened to settlement and the community of Diller was formed.

In 1886 the tribe shared an agent with several other local tribes, including the Ponca and Pawnee. The agency was located on the Oto Reservation. The present-day town of Barneston was settled at the site of one of the largest Otoe villages through the 19th century. The Indian agency and a trading post were located there. Barneston was founded by a French fur trapper who married to an Otoe woman.

== See also ==
- Otoe-Missouria Tribe of Indians
- Native American tribes in Nebraska
