= Rockford Township, Gage County, Nebraska =

Rockford Township
- Township
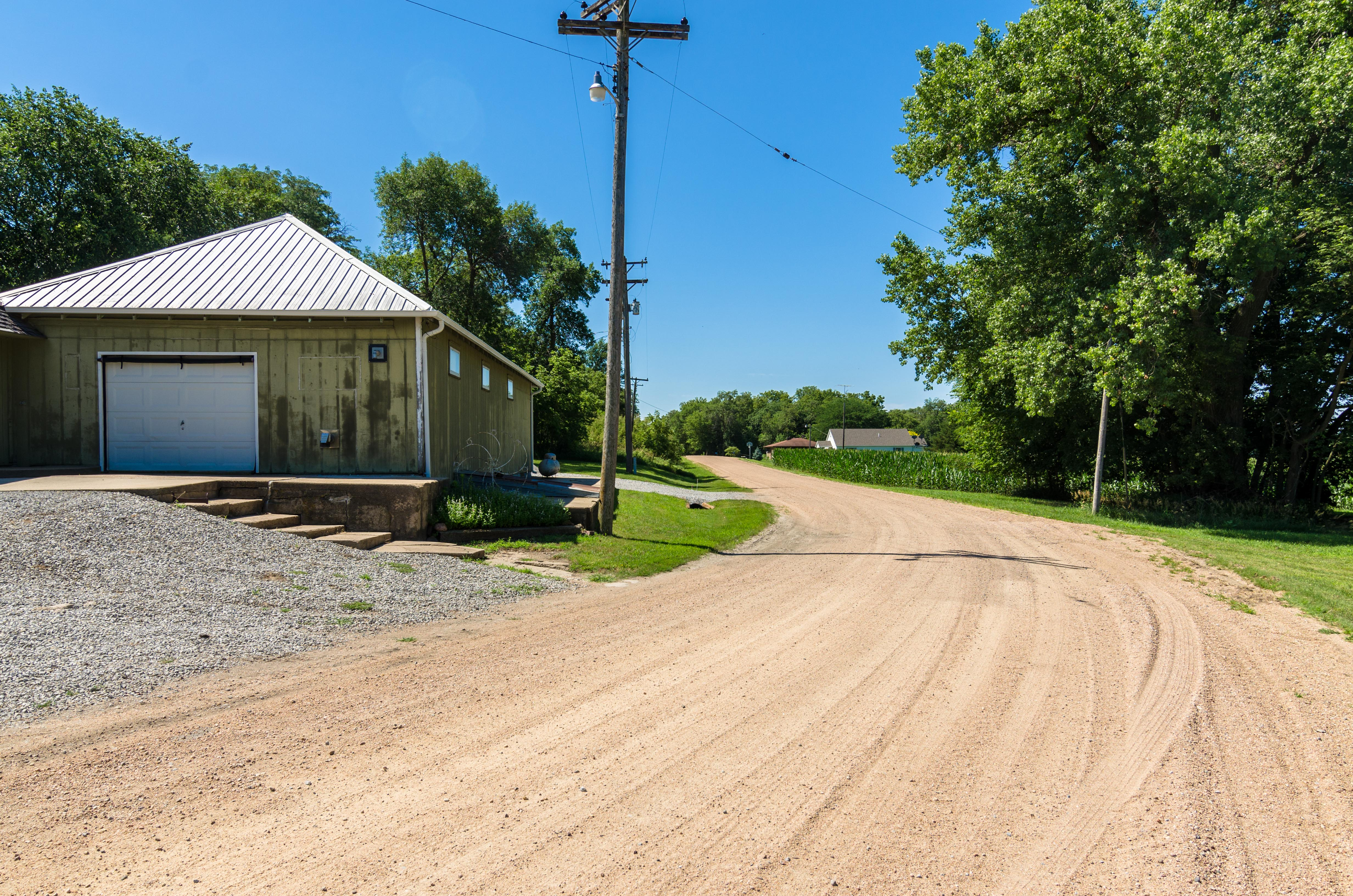
- The community of Rockford, NE

- Location in Gage County
- Coordinates: 40°12′45″N 096°38′01″W
- Country: United States
- State: Nebraska
- County: Gage

Area
  - Total: 35.89 sq mi (92.96 km^{2})
  - Land: 35.59 sq mi (92.17 km^{2})
  - Water: 0.31 sq mi (0.8 km^{2}) 0.86%
- Elevation: 1,300 ft (400 m)

Population (2020)
  - Total: 285
  - Density: 8.01/sq mi (3.09/km^{2})
- GNIS feature ID: 0838218

Rockford Township is one of twenty-four townships in Gage County, Nebraska, United States. The population was 285 at the 2020 census. A 2021 estimate placed the township's population at 285.

== Geography ==
With its northwest corner at the center of the county, it borders the following townships:

- Logan Township - north
- Filley Township - northeast corner
- Sherman Township - east
- Island Grove Township - southeast corner
- Blue Springs-Wymore Township - south
- Sicily Township - southwest corner
- Riverside Township - west
- Midland Township - northwest corner
