= Nebraska Highway 112 =

State highway in Nebraska, U.S.

State Highway 112

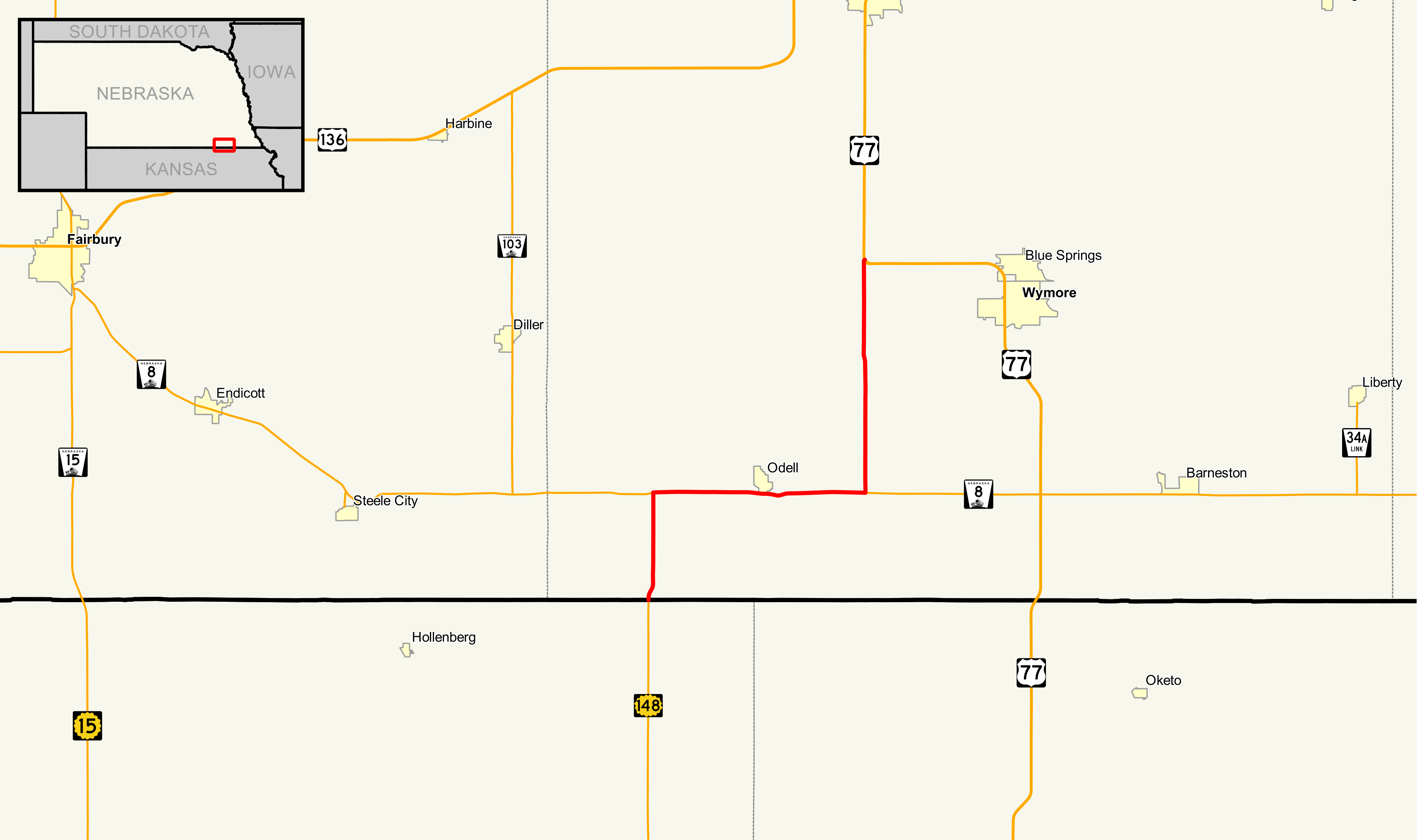
- Nebraska Highway 112 highlighted in red

Route information
- Maintained by NDOT
- Length: 15.69 mi (25.25 km)
- Existed: 1939–present

Major junctions
- West end: K-148 southwest of Odell
- East end: US 77 west of Blue Springs

Location
- Country: United States
- State: Nebraska
- Counties: Gage

Highway system
- Nebraska State Highway System; Interstate; US; State; Link; Spur; State Spurs; Recreation
← N-110	→ N-116

Nebraska Highway 112 is a highway in southeastern Nebraska. Its western terminus is at the Kansas border where it continues as K-148 southwest of Odell. Its eastern terminus is at U.S. Highway 77 west of Blue Springs.

== Route description ==
Nebraska Highway 112 begins at the border with Kansas, where it meets K-148. The highway heads north through farmland where it meets NE 8. It runs concurrently with NE 8 heading eastward through Odell. A few miles outside of Odell, the highway turns to the north again. It then continues northward until it terminates at US 77 west of Wymore.

== Major intersections ==
The entire route is in Gage County.

Location	mi	km	Destinations	Notes
40th parallel north	0.00	0.00	K-148 west (All American Road) / State Line Road – Hanover	Nebraska–Kansas line; continuation into Kansas; former K-15E
Glenwood Township	3.04	4.89	N-8 west – Superior	South end of N-8 overlap
Paddock Township	9.08	14.61	N-8 east – Pawnee City	North end of N-8 overlap
Sicily Township	15.57– 15.69	25.06– 25.25	US 77 – Lincoln, Wymore	Northern terminus
1.000 mi = 1.609 km; 1.000 km = 0.621 mi: Concurrency terminus

== See also ==
- List of state highways in Nebraska
