= Highland Township, Gage County, Nebraska =

Highland Township
- Township
- Location in Gage County
- Coordinates: 40°28′16″N 096°44′49″W
- Country: United States
- State: Nebraska
- County: Gage

Area
  - Total: 35.69 sq mi (92.44 km^{2})
  - Land: 35.47 sq mi (91.87 km^{2})
  - Water: 0.22 sq mi (0.57 km^{2}) 0.62%
- Elevation: 1,414 ft (431 m)

Population (2020)
  - Total: 928
  - Density: 26.2/sq mi (10.1/km^{2})
- GNIS feature ID: 0838056

Highland Township is one of twenty-four townships in Gage County, Nebraska, United States. The population was 928 at the 2020 census. A 2021 estimate placed the township's population at 928.

== Geography ==
Located in the far eastern part of the county, it borders the following townships:

- Buda Township, Lancaster County - north
- South Pass Township, Lancaster County - northeast corner
- Nemaha Township - east
- Hanover Township - southeast corner
- Holt Township - south
- Grant Township - southwest corner
- Clatonia Township - west
- Olive Branch Township, Lancaster County - northwest corner

The Village of Cortland lies within the Township.
