= Nebraska Highway 8 =

State highway in Nebraska, U.S.

State Highway 8

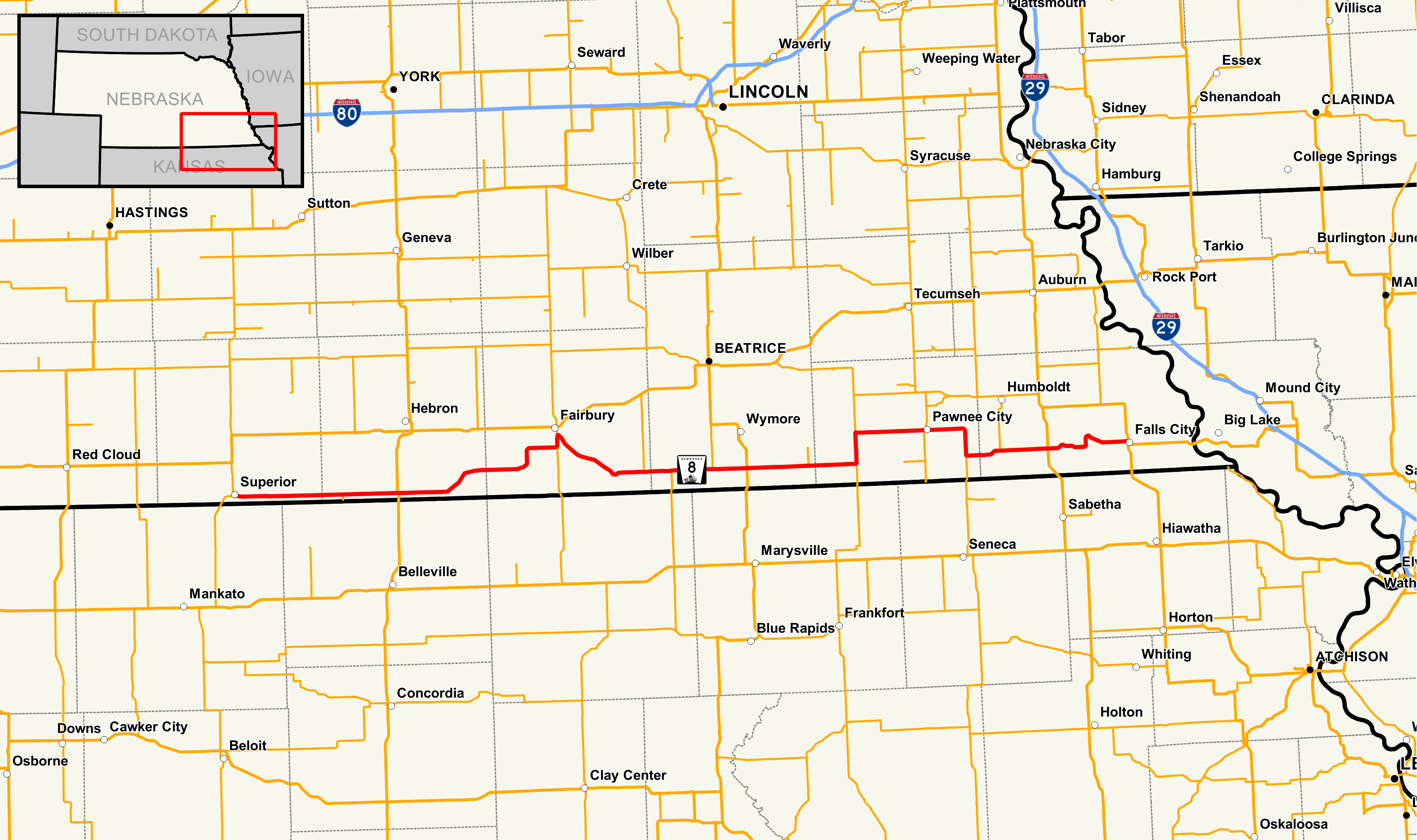
- Nebraska Highway 8 highlighted in red

Route information
- Maintained by NDOT
- Length: 148.89 mi (239.62 km)

Major junctions
- West end: N-14 in Superior
- US 81 in Chester; N-15 in Fairbury; US 77 near Barneston; US 75 near Salem
- East end: US 73 in Falls City

Location
- Country: United States
- State: Nebraska
- Counties: Nuckolls, Thayer, Jefferson, Gage, Pawnee, Richardson

Highway system
- Nebraska State Highway System; Interstate; US; State; Link; Spur; State Spurs; Recreation
← N-7	→ N-9

Nebraska Highway 8 (N-8) is a highway in southern and southeastern Nebraska. Its western terminus is at Nebraska Highway 14 in Superior and its eastern terminus is at U.S. Highway 73 (US 73) in Falls City. It runs through the southern tier of counties in Nebraska and is always within 10 miles (16 km) of the Kansas border.

== Route description ==
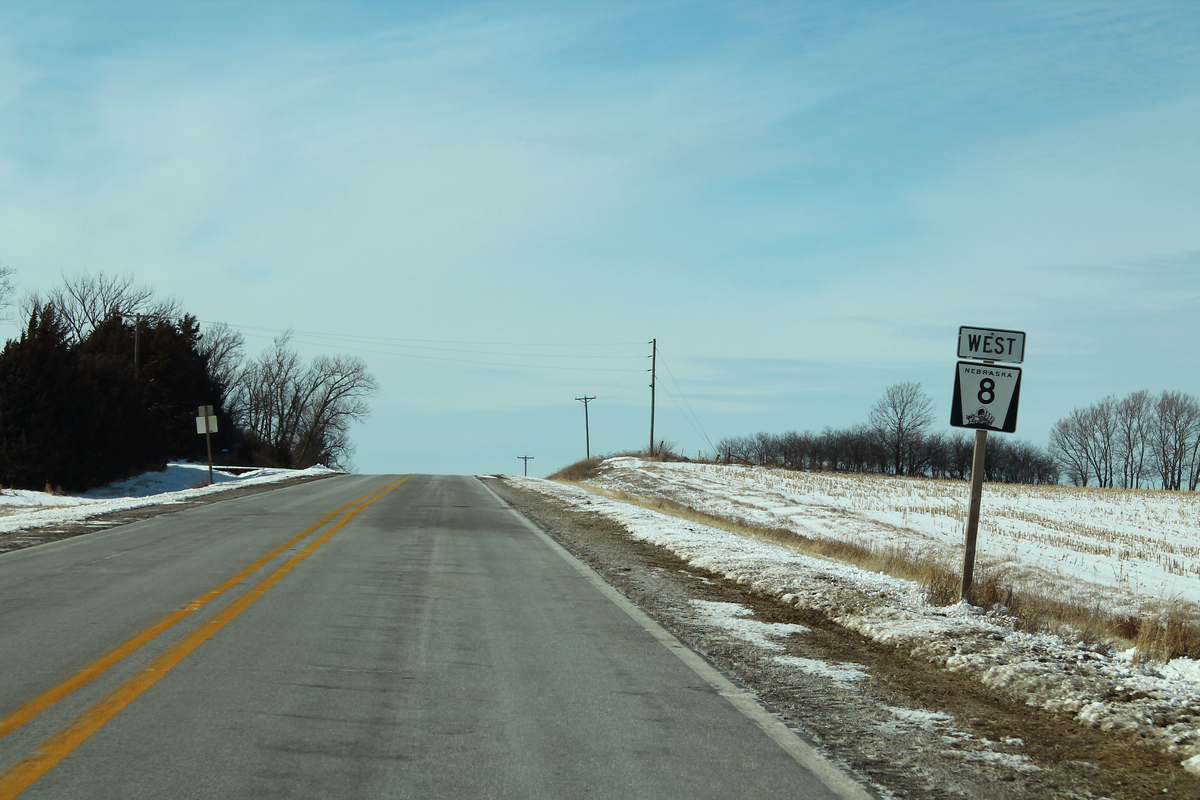
West along Nebraska Highway 8, February 2014

N-8 begins at N-14 in Superior and goes east through farmland until it meets US 81 in Chester. When the highway reaches Hubbell, it begins a segment where it goes northeasterly towards Fairbury until it meets N-15. It goes north with N-15 into Fairbury, crosses the Little Blue River, then turns southeast towards Steele City. It goes straight east through Odell and Barneston, passing US 77 between those two villages. At N-99, the highway turns north, overlapping N-99 for 5 miles (8.0 km). It then turns east towards Pawnee City. At Pawnee City, it meets N-50 and goes east and then south with it, separating just before Du Bois. It turns east, meets US 75 south of Dawson and ends in downtown Falls City at an intersection with US 73.

== History ==
According to 1937 and 1940 state maps, the first N-8 designation began in Omaha on Military Road (which was rerouted at least once in the Omaha area, according to the 1955 state map). It then passed through Irvington and Elk City before terminating in Fremont. The original route designation largely disappeared from state maps by 1962. Most of the original route has since been turned over to local control.

Route 3S was renumbered N-8 in about 1960.

== Major intersections ==
County	Location	mi	km	Destinations	Notes
Nuckolls	Superior	0.00	0.00	N-14 (East 3rd Street/North Idaho Street)	
Thayer	Byron	16.01	25.77	S-85A south	
Thayer	Chester	24.10	38.79	US 81	
Thayer	Hubbell	30.17	48.55	S-85B south	
Jefferson	Fairbury	50.99	82.06	N-15 south	Western end of N-15 overlap
Jefferson	Fairbury	52.70	84.81	N-15 north (K Street) / Oregon National Historic Trail / California National Historic Trail / Pony Express National Historic Trail	Eastern end of N-15 overlap
Jefferson	Steele City	62.62	100.78	S-48A south (South Railroad Street)	
Jefferson		67.55	108.71	N-103 north (581st Avenue)	
Gage		71.56	115.16	N-112 south (West 103 Road) / Oregon National Historic Trail / California National Historic Trail / Pony Express National Historic Trail	Western end of N-112 overlap
Gage		77.60	124.89	N-112 north	Eastern end of N-112 overlap
Gage		82.58	132.90	US 77	
Gage	Liberty	91.57	147.37	S-34A north	
Pawnee		98.61	158.70	N-99 south	Western end of N-99 overlap
Pawnee		103.24	166.15	N-99 north	Eastern end of N-99 overlap
Pawnee	Pawnee City	113.30	182.34	N-65 south (A Street)	Western end of N-65 overlap
Pawnee	Pawnee City	113.67	182.93	N-50 / N-65 north (Sherman Street)	Eastern end of N-65 overlap; western end of N-50 overlap
Pawnee		123.13	198.16	N-50 south	Eastern end of N-50 overlap
Richardson		128.27	206.43	N-105 north	
Richardson		135.26	217.68	US 75	
Richardson	Falls City	148.89	239.62	US 73 (Harlan Street)	
1.000 mi = 1.609 km; 1.000 km = 0.621 mi: Concurrency terminus
