= Midland Township, Nebraska =

Midland Township, Nebraska may refer to one of the following places:

- Midland Township, Gage County, Nebraska
- Midland Township, Merrick County, Nebraska

See also: Midland Township (disambiguation)
