= Blue Springs =

Blue Springs can refer to:

- Blue Springs, Alabama
- Blue Springs (Marion County, Florida)
- Blue Springs, Mississippi
- Blue Springs, Missouri
- Blue Springs (Hot Spring), a hot spring in Mammoth Hot Springs, Yellowstone National Park
- Blue Springs, Nebraska
- Blue Springs-Wymore Township, Gage County, Nebraska
- Blue Springs (Jackson County, Florida), a 1st magnitude spring in Jackson County, Florida
- Battle of Blue Springs, a battle in the American Civil War
- Gilchrist Blue Springs State Park, in Gilchrist County, Florida

See also

- Blue Spring (disambiguation)
