= Esther Pilster =

American educator and principal (1916–2014)

- Esther Pilster, from a 1969 newspaper
- Born: Esther Eunice Jones; November 16, 1916 near Wymore, Nebraska, U.S.
- Died: July 20, 2014 (aged 97); Omaha, Nebraska, U.S.
- Occupations: Educator, philanthropist

Esther Pilster (November 11, 1916 – July 20, 2014), born Esther Eunice Jones, was an educator, principal, activist and philanthropist from Nebraska.

== Early life and education ==
Esther Eunice Jones was born on a farm near Wymore, the daughter of Edward Evan Jones and Margaret Oliver Humphreys Jones. Her mother and paternal grandparents were born in Wales. She graduated from Otoe Consolidated High School in Barneston. In 1938, Jones trained as a teacher at Peru State College, and earned bachelor's and master's degrees at the University of Nebraska Omaha.

== Career ==
After graduating, Pilster got her first job teaching at a one-room school in Gage County. She moved to Omaha in the 1940s to teach at elementary schools such as Jungemann and Belle Ryan. She rose to the rank of principal and was appointed the first principal of Boyd Elementary School, a position she held for over 21 years before retiring in 1982.

Pilster was a featured annual speaker at Rural Teachers Institutes in Gage County through the 1940s. For several years in the 1950s, she taught at a summer reading clinic for gifted children in Omaha. In the 1960s she was elected president of the Nebraska chapter of Delta Kappa Gamma professional society.

== Retirement ==
During her retirement, she presented book reviews, programs for professional groups and care centers in the Omaha area. She would often present reviews and programs in a wide variety of historical and fantasy costumes such as the Statue of Liberty, Betsy Ross and an Easter Bunny. For example, in 1993, she gave a presentation about First Ladies of the United States, dressed as a White House maid. In 1984, Pilster served as a Congressional Senior Intern in Washington, D.C.

In 2006, as a memorial to her late husband, she donated over 3,731 acres of ranchland for the creation of the Mari Sandoz Heritage Center. The heritage center focuses on teaching agricultural skills and a research center for agronomy research. She was also involved in the Great Plains Welsh Heritage Museum and the Welsh Society of Nebraska.

== Awards ==
In 1979, Pilster was named "Queen of Keystone", an honorary title given to notable people in Keystone, a neighborhood in North Omaha. In 1997, Omaha renamed a park to Esther Pilster Park. In 2006, Pilster received a key to Omaha for her years of dedication to the community. In 2008, Pilster received an award for "outstanding educator" from the Omaha World Herald.

== Personal life ==
In 1939, Esther Jones married fellow educator Raleigh A. Pilster; he died in 2002. Esther Pilster died at her home in Omaha in 2014, aged 97 years.
