= Wymore =

Wymore may refer to one of the following:

== People ==
- Patrice Wymore (1926–2014), American actress
- A. Wayne Wymore (1927–2011), American mathematician and engineer

== Places ==
- Blue Springs-Wymore Township, Gage County, Nebraska
- Wymore, Nebraska
