= Hooker Township =

Hooker Township may refer to the following townships in the United States:

- Hooker Township, Dixon County, Nebraska
- Hooker Township, Gage County, Nebraska
- Hooker Township, Oklahoma, in Texas County
