= Hooker Township, Nebraska =

Hooker Township, Nebraska may refer to one of the following places:

- Hooker Township, Dixon County, Nebraska
- Hooker Township, Gage County, Nebraska
