= Liberty Township, Gage County, Nebraska =

Liberty Township
- Township
- Location in Gage County
- Coordinates: 40°03′07″N 096°31′04″W
- Country: United States
- State: Nebraska
- County: Gage

Area
  - Total: 36.09 sq mi (93.47 km^{2})
  - Land: 35.92 sq mi (93.04 km^{2})
  - Water: 0.16 sq mi (0.42 km^{2}) 0.45%
- Elevation: 1,335 ft (407 m)

Population (2020)
  - Total: 200
  - Density: 5.6/sq mi (2.1/km^{2})
- GNIS feature ID: 0838087

Liberty Township is one of twenty-four townships in Gage County, Nebraska, United States. The population was 200 at the 2020 census. A 2021 estimate placed the township's population at 200.

Most of the villages of Barneston and Liberty lie within the Township.
