= Midland Township =

Midland Township may refer to:

- Midland Township, Lyon County, Iowa
- Midland Township, Michigan
- Midland Township, St. Louis County, Missouri, in St. Louis County, Missouri
- Midland Township, Gage County, Nebraska
- Midland Township, Merrick County, Nebraska
- Midland Township, Bergen County, New Jersey
- Midland Township, Pembina County, North Dakota, in Pembina County, North Dakota
- Midland Township, Hand County, South Dakota, in Hand County, South Dakota
