= Nemaha =

Nemaha is the name of several places in the United States, including:

- Nemaha, Iowa
- Nemaha, Nebraska
- Nemaha County, Kansas
- Nemaha County, Nebraska
- Nemaha Township, Gage County, Nebraska
