= Blue Spring =

Blue Spring can refer to:

== Art and Entertainment ==
- Blue Spring (manga), a manga by Taiyō Matsumoto
- Blue Spring (film), a 2001 film adapted from the above
- Blue Spring (album), a 1959 album by jazz trumpeter Kenny Dorham and saxophonist Cannonball Adderley

== Geography ==
- Blue Spring (Madison County, Florida), a 1st magnitude spring
- Blue Spring State Park, a 1st magnitude spring in Volusia County, Florida
- Blue Spring, West Virginia, an unincorporated community

== See also ==
- Blue Springs (disambiguation)
