= Island Grove Township =

Island Grove Township may refer to one of the following places in the United States:

- Island Grove Township, Sangamon County, Illinois
- Island Grove Township, Gage County, Nebraska
