= Cortland, Nebraska =

- Village
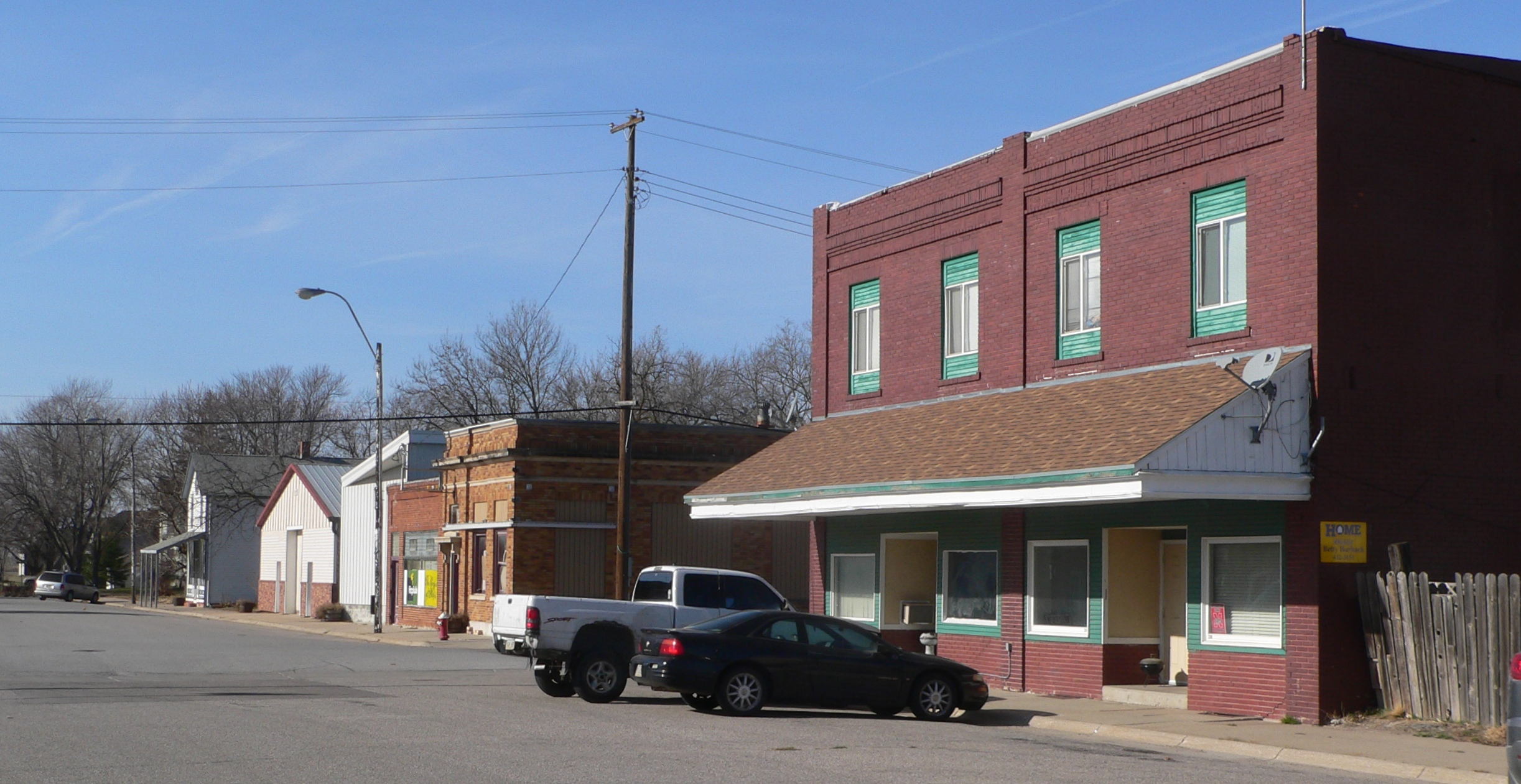
- Downtown Cortland: 4th Street

- Location of Cortland, Nebraska
- Coordinates: 40°30′21″N 96°42′22″W
- Country: United States
- State: Nebraska
- County: Gage
- Township: Highland

Area
  - Total: 0.26 sq mi (0.68 km^{2})
  - Land: 0.26 sq mi (0.68 km^{2})
  - Water: 0 sq mi (0.00 km^{2})
- Elevation: 1,447 ft (441 m)

Population (2020)
  - Total: 504
  - Density: 1,917.0/sq mi (740.15/km^{2})
- Time zone: UTC-6 (Central (CST))
  - Summer (DST): UTC-5 (CDT)
- ZIP code: 68331
- Area code: 402
- FIPS code: 31-10635
- GNIS feature ID: 2398631
- Website: villageofcortland.com

Cortland is a village in Gage County, Nebraska, United States. The population was 504 at the 2020 census.

== History ==
Cortland was platted in 1884 when the railroad was extended to that point. An early variant name was "Galesburg". The present name is a transfer from the city of Cortland, New York.

== Geography ==
According to the United States Census Bureau, the village has a total area of 0.26 square miles (0.67 km^{2}), all land.

The village is located approximately 20 miles south of Lincoln and 18 miles north of Beatrice along U.S. Route 77. It is situated within Norris School District 160, which is headquartered in Firth.

== Demographics ==
Historical population
Census	Pop.	Note	%±
1890	509		—
1900	390		−23.4%
1910	364		−6.7%
1920	322		−11.5%
1930	318		−1.2%
1940	307		−3.5%
1950	288		−6.2%
1960	285		−1.0%
1970	326		14.4%
1980	403		23.6%
1990	393		−2.5%
2000	488		24.2%
2010	482		−1.2%
2020	504		4.6%
U.S. Decennial Census

=== 2010 census ===
As of the census of 2010, there were 482 people, 204 households, and 138 families living in the village. The population density was 1,853.8 inhabitants per square mile (715.8/km^{2}). There were 219 housing units at an average density of 842.3 per square mile (325.2/km^{2}). The racial makeup of the village was 98.8% White, 0.6% Native American, 0.2% Asian, and 0.4% from two or more races. Hispanic or Latino of any race were 0.2% of the population.

There were 204 households, of which 31.4% had children under the age of 18 living with them, 59.3% were married couples living together, 6.4% had a female householder with no husband present, 2.0% had a male householder with no wife present, and 32.4% were non-families. 24.5% of all households were made up of individuals, and 12.2% had someone living alone who was 65 years of age or older. The average household size was 2.36 and the average family size was 2.83.

The median age in the village was 40.4 years. 24.1% of residents were under the age of 18; 4.3% were between the ages of 18 and 24; 30.5% were from 25 to 44; 23% were from 45 to 64; and 18% were 65 years of age or older. The gender makeup of the village was 50.8% male and 49.2% female.

In 2010, the median household annual income was $60,417. The median family income was $70,278. Income per capita was $27,284. For females working full time the median income was $37,321 and for males was $41,563. Of the population aged 16 or older, 271 were employed and 27 were unemployed. The average commute time to work was 27 minutes with 238 of the working population over age 16 commuting to work.

=== 2000 census ===
As of the census of 2000, there were 488 people, 198 households, and 149 families living in the village. The population density was 1,911.2 inhabitants per square mile (737.9/km^{2}). There were 209 housing units at an average density of 818.5 per square mile (316.0/km^{2}). The racial makeup of the village was 98.77% White, 0.20% Asian, and 1.02% from two or more races. Hispanic or Latino of any race were 0.41% of the population.

There were 198 households, out of which 34.8% had children under the age of 18 living with them, 65.7% were married couples living together, 8.1% had a female householder with no husband present, and 24.7% were non-families. 21.7% of all households were made up of individuals, and 7.6% had someone living alone who was 65 years of age or older. The average household size was 2.46 and the average family size was 2.89.

In the village, the population was spread out, with 25.8% under the age of 18, 7.2% from 18 to 24, 30.1% from 25 to 44, 21.5% from 45 to 64, and 15.4% who were 65 years of age or older. The median age was 37 years. For every 100 females, there were 105.9 males. For every 100 females age 18 and over, there were 96.7 males.

As of 2000 the median income for a household in the village was $40,694, and the median income for a family was $47,000. Males had a median income of $31,583 versus $23,000 for females. The per capita income for the village was $17,053. About 2.7% of families and 4.3% of the population were below the poverty line, including 3.6% of those under age 18 and 5.8% of those age 65 or over.

== Education ==
Its school district is Norris School District 160.
