= Blakely Township =

Blakely Township may refer to one of the following places in the United States:

- Blakely Township, Geary County, Kansas
- Blakely Township, Gage County, Nebraska

== See also ==
- Blakeley Township, Scott County, Minnesota
