= Hoag, Nebraska =

Unincorporated community in Nebraska, U.S.

Coordinates: 40°19′03″N 96°49′58″W

Hoag is an unincorporated community in Gage County, Nebraska, United States.

== History ==
Hoag was named for one Mr. Hoagland, the original owner of the town site. Hoag was the first station on the railroad out of Beatrice.

Hoag had a post office between 1885 and 1934.
