= Lincoln Township, Gage County, Nebraska =

Lincoln Township
- Township
- Location in Gage County
- Coordinates: 40°13′09″N 096°51′04″W
- Country: United States
- State: Nebraska
- County: Gage

Area
  - Total: 36.01 sq mi (93.26 km^{2})
  - Land: 35.97 sq mi (93.16 km^{2})
  - Water: 0.039 sq mi (0.1 km^{2}) 0.11%
- Elevation: 1,424 ft (434 m)

Population (2020)
  - Total: 207
  - Density: 5.75/sq mi (2.22/km^{2})
- GNIS feature ID: 0838094

Lincoln Township is one of twenty-four townships in Gage County, Nebraska, United States. The population was 207 at the 2020 census. A 2021 estimate placed the township's population at 207.
