= Sherman Township, Gage County, Nebraska =

Sherman Township
- Township
- Location in Gage County
- Coordinates: 40°13′06″N 096°30′43″W
- Country: United States
- State: Nebraska
- County: Gage

Area
  - Total: 36.02 sq mi (93.28 km^{2})
  - Land: 35.88 sq mi (92.94 km^{2})
  - Water: 0.13 sq mi (0.34 km^{2}) 0.36%
- Elevation: 1,512 ft (461 m)

Population (2020)
  - Total: 204
  - Density: 5.68/sq mi (2.19/km^{2})
- GNIS feature ID: 0838248

Sherman Township is one of twenty-four townships in Gage County, Nebraska, United States. The population was 204 at the 2020 census. A 2021 estimate placed the township's population at 202.

The Village of Virginia lies within the township.
