= Rockford, Nebraska =

- Unincorporated community
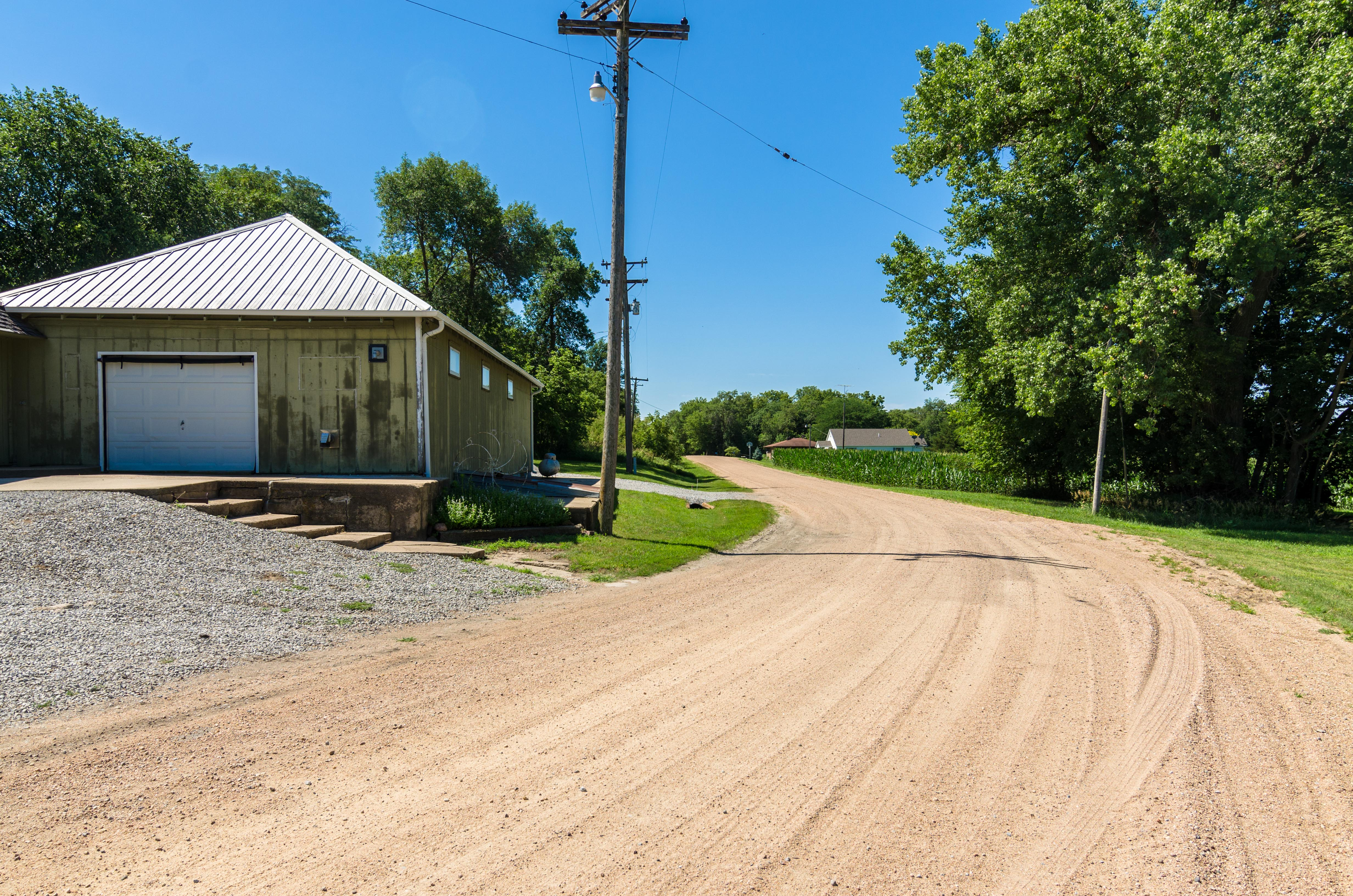
- Rockford Road in Rockford

- Location within the state of Nebraska
- Coordinates: 40°15′06″N 96°36′01″W
- Country: United States
- State: Nebraska
- County: Gage
- Elevation: 1,339 ft (408 m)
- Time zone: UTC-6 (Central (CST))
  - Summer (DST): UTC-5 (CDT)
- ZIP code: 68310
- FIPS code: 31-42005
- GNIS feature ID: 832652

Rockford is an unincorporated community in Gage County, Nebraska, United States.

== History ==
Rockford was founded in 1858.
