= Ellis, Nebraska =

Unincorporated community in Nebraska, United States

- Unincorporated community
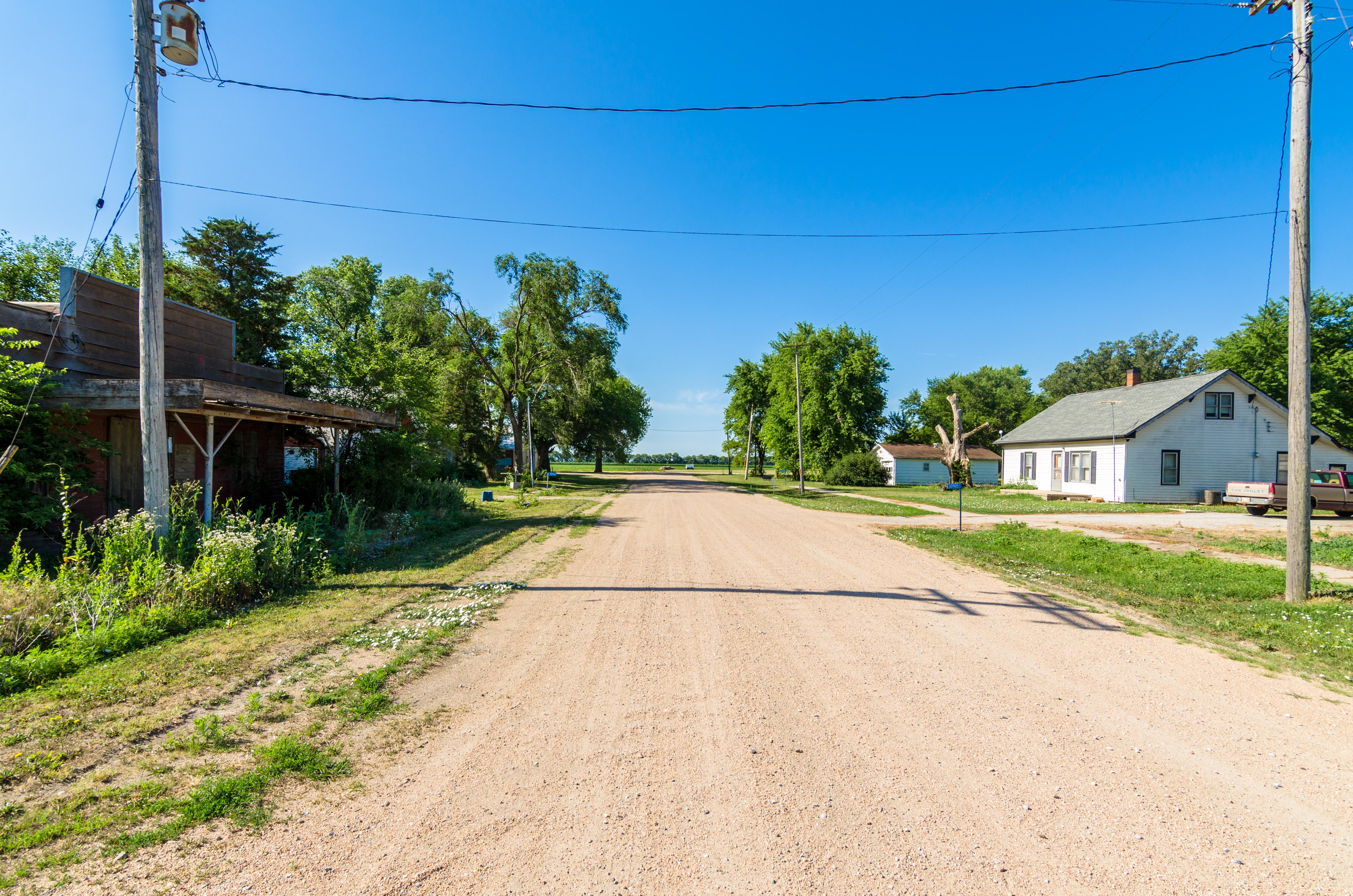
- 1st Street in Ellis

- Location within the state of Nebraska
- Coordinates: 40°13′06″N 96°52′33″W
- Country: United States
- State: Nebraska
- County: Gage
- Elevation: 1,434 ft (437 m)
- Time zone: UTC-6 (Central (CST))
  - Summer (DST): UTC-5 (CDT)
- ZIP code: 68310
- FIPS code: 31-15150
- GNIS feature ID: 829069

Ellis is an unincorporated community in Gage County, Nebraska, United States.

== History ==
Ellis was named for John R. Ellis, a local banker. A post office was established in Ellis in 1887, and remained in operation until it was discontinued in 1958.
