= Krider, Nebraska =

Unincorporated community in Nebraska, U.S.

Coordinates: 40°04′15″N 96°44′46″W

Krider is an unincorporated community in Gage County, Nebraska, United States.

== History ==
Krider was a station on the Chicago, Burlington and Quincy Railroad.
