= Blue Spring, West Virginia =

Unincorporated community in West Virginia, US

Coordinates: 38°32′12″N 80°06′44″W

Blue Spring is an unincorporated community in Randolph County, in the U.S. state of West Virginia.

== History ==
A post office called Blue Spring was established in 1876, the name was changed to Bluespring in 1895, and the post office closed in 1942. The community was named after a nearby spring noted for its blue waters.
