= Blue Springs-Wymore Township, Gage County, Nebraska =

Blue Springs-Wymore Township
- Township
- Location in Gage County
- Coordinates: 40°07′37″N 096°38′18″W
- Country: United States
- State: Nebraska
- County: Gage

Area Beatrice Area
  - Total: 36.05 sq mi (93.37 km^{2})
  - Land: 36.0 sq mi (93.3 km^{2})
  - Water: 0.027 sq mi (0.07 km^{2}) 0.07%
- Elevation: 1,302 ft (397 m)

Population (2020)
  - Total: 1,773
  - Density: 49.2/sq mi (19.0/km^{2})
- Postal code: 68466
- GNIS feature ID: 0837888
- Website: https://www.wymorebluesprings.com/

Blue Springs-Wymore Township is one of twenty-four townships in Gage County, Nebraska, United States. The population was 1,773 at the 2020 census. A 2021 estimate placed the township's population at 1,760.

The cities of Blue Springs and Wymore lie within the Township.
