= Paddock Township, Gage County, Nebraska =

Paddock Township
- Township
- Location in Gage County
- Coordinates: 40°02′41″N 096°45′09″W
- Country: United States
- State: Nebraska
- County: Gage

Area
  - Total: 36.2 sq mi (93.7 km^{2})
  - Land: 35.93 sq mi (93.07 km^{2})
  - Water: 0.24 sq mi (0.63 km^{2}) 0.67%
- Elevation: 1,350 ft (410 m)

Population (2020)
  - Total: 331
  - Density: 9.21/sq mi (3.56/km^{2})
- GNIS feature ID: 0838181

Paddock Township is one of twenty-four townships in Gage County, Nebraska, United States. The population was 331 at the 2020 census. A 2021 estimate placed the township's population at 330.

A portion of the Village of Odell lies within the Township.
