= Glenwood Township, Gage County, Nebraska =

Glenwood Township
- Township
- Location in Gage County
- Coordinates: 40°02′42″N 096°51′27″W
- Country: United States
- State: Nebraska
- County: Gage

Area
  - Total: 36.3 sq mi (93.9 km^{2})
  - Land: 35.98 sq mi (93.19 km^{2})
  - Water: 0.27 sq mi (0.7 km^{2}) 0.75%
- Elevation: 1,332 ft (406 m)

Population (2020)
  - Total: 185
  - Density: 5.14/sq mi (1.99/km^{2})
- GNIS feature ID: 0838028

Glenwood Township is one of twenty-four townships in Gage County, Nebraska, United States. The population was 185 at the 2020 census. A 2021 estimate placed the township's population at 183.

A portion of the Village of Odell lies within the Township.
