= Grant Township, Gage County, Nebraska =

Grant Township
- Township
- Location in Gage County
- Coordinates: 40°23′37″N 096°51′21″W
- Country: United States
- State: Nebraska
- County: Gage

Area
  - Total: 36.11 sq mi (93.53 km^{2})
  - Land: 36.04 sq mi (93.34 km^{2})
  - Water: 0.073 sq mi (0.19 km^{2}) 0.2%
- Elevation: 1,368 ft (417 m)

Population (2020)
  - Total: 178
  - Density: 4.94/sq mi (1.91/km^{2})
- GNIS feature ID: 0838038

Grant Township is one of twenty-four townships in Gage County, Nebraska, United States. The population was 178 at the 2020 census. A 2021 estimate placed the township's population at 178.
