= Virginia, Nebraska =

- Village
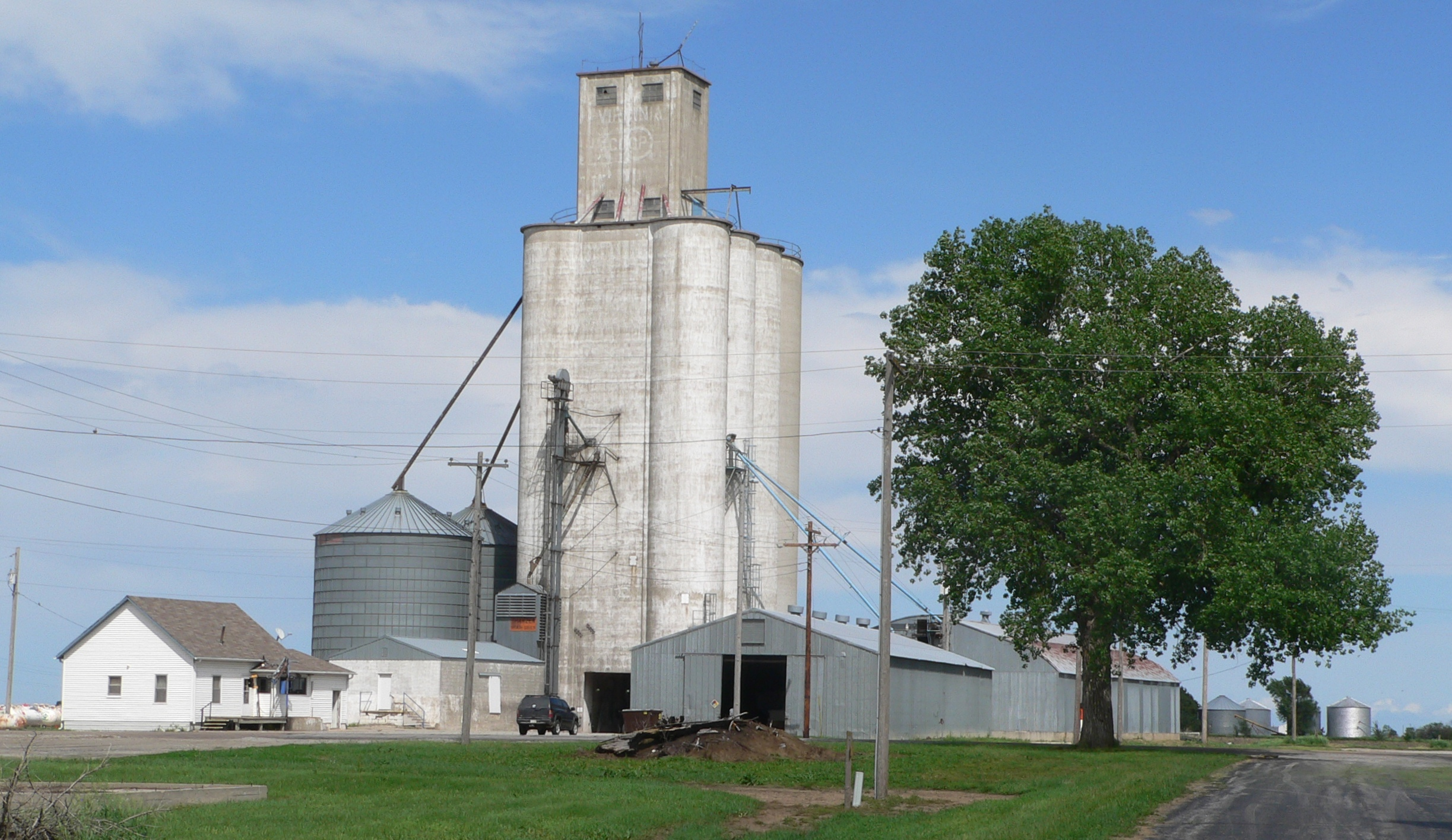
- Virginia grain elevator

- Location of Virginia, Nebraska
- Coordinates: 40°14′45″N 96°29′56″W
- Country: United States
- State: Nebraska
- County: Gage
- Named for: Virginia Lewis

Area
  - Total: 0.10 sq mi (0.26 km^{2})
  - Land: 0.10 sq mi (0.26 km^{2})
  - Water: 0 sq mi (0.00 km^{2})
- Elevation: 1,522 ft (464 m)

Population (2020)
  - Total: 74
  - Density: 747.2/sq mi (288.49/km^{2})
- Time zone: UTC-6 (Central (CST))
  - Summer (DST): UTC-5 (CDT)
- ZIP code: 68458
- Area code: 402
- FIPS code: 31-50790
- GNIS feature ID: 2400075

Virginia is a village in Gage County, Nebraska, United States. The population was 74 at the 2020 census.

== History ==
Virginia was platted in 1887 when the railroad was extended to that point. It was named for Virginia Lewis, the daughter of a pioneer settler.

== Geography ==
According to the United States Census Bureau, the village has a total area of 0.10 square miles (0.26 km^{2}), all land.

=== Climate ===
Climate data for Virginia, Nebraska (1991–2020)
Month	Jan	Feb	Mar	Apr	May	Jun	Jul	Aug	Sep	Oct	Nov	Dec	Year
Mean daily maximum °F (°C)	34.1 (1.2)	39.0 (3.9)	51.2 (10.7)	62.7 (17.1)	72.2 (22.3)	81.9 (27.7)	86.5 (30.3)	84.9 (29.4)	77.7 (25.4)	65.2 (18.4)	50.1 (10.1)	38.2 (3.4)	62.0 (16.7)
Daily mean °F (°C)	24.2 (−4.3)	28.7 (−1.8)	39.8 (4.3)	50.7 (10.4)	61.0 (16.1)	71.5 (21.9)	76.0 (24.4)	74.3 (23.5)	66.2 (19.0)	53.8 (12.1)	39.6 (4.2)	28.7 (−1.8)	51.2 (10.7)
Mean daily minimum °F (°C)	14.4 (−9.8)	18.4 (−7.6)	28.3 (−2.1)	38.8 (3.8)	49.8 (9.9)	61.1 (16.2)	65.5 (18.6)	63.7 (17.6)	54.7 (12.6)	42.3 (5.7)	29.2 (−1.6)	19.2 (−7.1)	40.4 (4.7)
Average precipitation inches (mm)	0.80 (20)	1.06 (27)	2.08 (53)	3.24 (82)	5.32 (135)	4.18 (106)	4.45 (113)	3.56 (90)	3.04 (77)	2.60 (66)	1.47 (37)	1.19 (30)	32.99 (836)
Average snowfall inches (cm)	6.1 (15)	4.9 (12)	2.9 (7.4)	1.2 (3.0)	0.0 (0.0)	0.0 (0.0)	0.0 (0.0)	0.0 (0.0)	0.0 (0.0)	0.8 (2.0)	1.8 (4.6)	3.7 (9.4)	21.4 (53.4)
Source: NOAA

== Demographics ==
Historical population
Census	Pop.	Note	%±
1910	154		—
1920	116		−24.7%
1930	157		35.3%
1940	144		−8.3%
1950	113		−21.5%
1960	88		−22.1%
1970	83		−5.7%
1980	90		8.4%
1990	94		4.4%
2000	67		−28.7%
2010	60		−10.4%
2020	74		23.3%
U.S. Decennial Census

=== 2010 census ===
As of the census of 2010, there were 60 people, 29 households, and 17 families living in the village. The population density was 600.0 inhabitants per square mile (231.7/km^{2}). There were 35 housing units at an average density of 350.0 units per square mile (135.1 units/km^{2}). The racial makeup of the village was 91.7% White, 1.7% Native American, and 6.7% from two or more races.

There were 29 households, of which 24.1% had children under the age of 18 living with them, 44.8% were married couples living together, 3.4% had a female householder with no husband present, 10.3% had a male householder with no wife present, and 41.4% were non-families. 37.9% of all households were made up of individuals, and 10.3% had someone living alone who was 65 years of age or older. The average household size was 2.07 and the average family size was 2.59.

The median age in the village was 45.5 years. 20% of residents were under the age of 18; 6.7% were between the ages of 18 and 24; 21.6% were from 25 to 44; 33.3% were from 45 to 64; and 18.3% were 65 years of age or older. The gender makeup of the village was 55.0% male and 45.0% female.

=== 2000 census ===
As of the census of 2000, there were 67 people, 31 households, and 20 families living in the village. The population density was 680.2 inhabitants per square mile (262.6/km^{2}). There were 35 housing units at an average density of 355.3 units per square mile (137.2 units/km^{2}). The racial makeup of the village was 98.51% White and 1.49% Native American.

There were 31 households, out of which 19.4% had children under the age of 18 living with them, 54.8% were married couples living together, 9.7% had a female householder with no husband present, and 32.3% were non-families. 29.0% of all households were made up of individuals, and 9.7% had someone living alone who was 65 years of age or older. The average household size was 2.16 and the average family size was 2.67.

In the village, the population was spread out, with 14.9% under the age of 18, 7.5% from 18 to 24, 37.3% from 25 to 44, 19.4% from 45 to 64, and 20.9% who were 65 years of age or older. The median age was 42 years. For every 100 females, there were 131.0 males. For every 100 females age 18 and over, there were 128.0 males.

As of 2000 the median income for a household in the village was $32,679, and the median income for a family was $34,750. Males had a median income of $27,250 versus $22,000 for females. The per capita income for the village was $17,473. There were no families and 5.5% of the population living below the poverty line, including no under eighteens and none of those over 64.
