= Riverside Township, Gage County, Nebraska =

Riverside Township
- Township
- Location in Gage County
- Coordinates: 40°13′18″N 096°44′37″W
- Country: United States
- State: Nebraska
- County: Gage

Area
  - Total: 33.77 sq mi (87.46 km^{2})
  - Land: 33.70 sq mi (87.28 km^{2})
  - Water: 0.069 sq mi (0.18 km^{2}) 0.21%
- Elevation: 1,368 ft (417 m)

Population (2020)
  - Total: 387
  - Density: 11.5/sq mi (4.43/km^{2})
- GNIS feature ID: 0838215

Riverside Township is one of twenty-four townships in Gage County, Nebraska, United States. The population was 387 at the 2020 census. A 2021 estimate placed the township's population at 384.
