= Clatonia Township, Gage County, Nebraska =

Clatonia Township
- Township
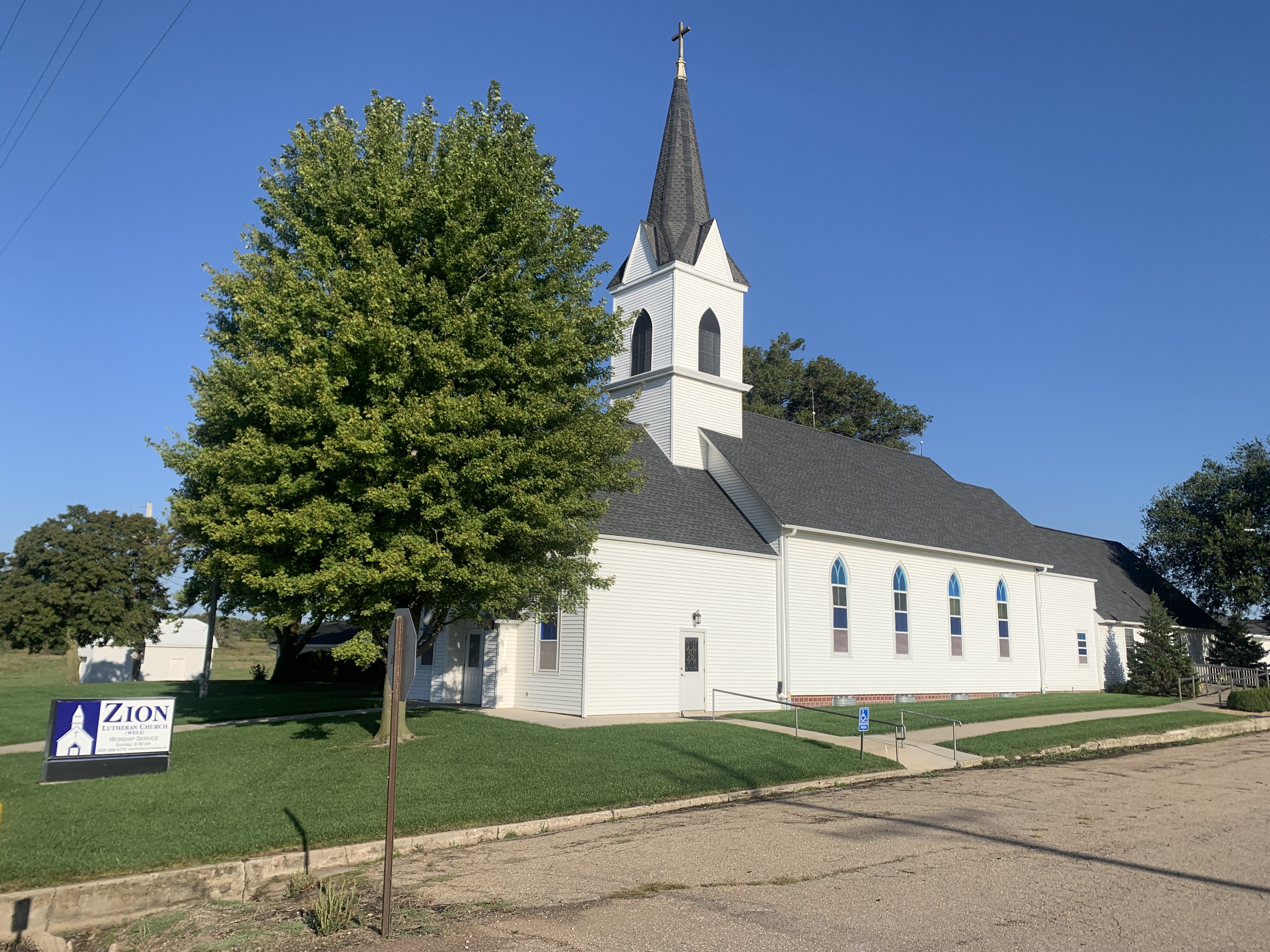
- Zion Lutheran Church, just west of Clatonia

- Location in Gage County
- Coordinates: 40°28′47″N 096°51′23″W
- Country: United States
- State: Nebraska
- County: Gage

Area
  - Total: 36.1 sq mi (93.6 km^{2})
  - Land: 35.92 sq mi (93.02 km^{2})
  - Water: 0.22 sq mi (0.58 km^{2}) 0.62%
- Elevation: 1,391 ft (424 m)

Population (2020)
  - Total: 481
  - Density: 13.4/sq mi (5.17/km^{2})
- GNIS feature ID: 0837922

Clatonia Township is one of twenty-four townships in Gage County, Nebraska, United States. The population was 481 at the 2020 census. A 2021 estimate placed the township's population at 481.

The Village of Clatonia lies within the township.
