= Barneston Township, Gage County, Nebraska =

Barneston Township
- Township
- Location in Gage County
- Coordinates: 40°02′42″N 096°38′17″W
- Country: United States
- State: Nebraska
- County: Gage

Area
  - Total: 35.92 sq mi (93.04 km^{2})
  - Land: 35.88 sq mi (92.93 km^{2})
  - Water: 0.042 sq mi (0.11 km^{2}) 0.12%
- Elevation: 1,358 ft (414 m)

Population (2020)
  - Total: 168 ▼
  - Density: 6.0/sq mi (2.3/km^{2})
- GNIS feature ID: 0837866

Barneston Township is one of twenty-four townships in Gage County, Nebraska, United States. The population was 168 at the 2020 census. A 2021 estimate placed the township's population at 168.

A small portion of the Village of Barneston lies within the Township.
