= Gage County, Nebraska =

County in Nebraska, United States

- County
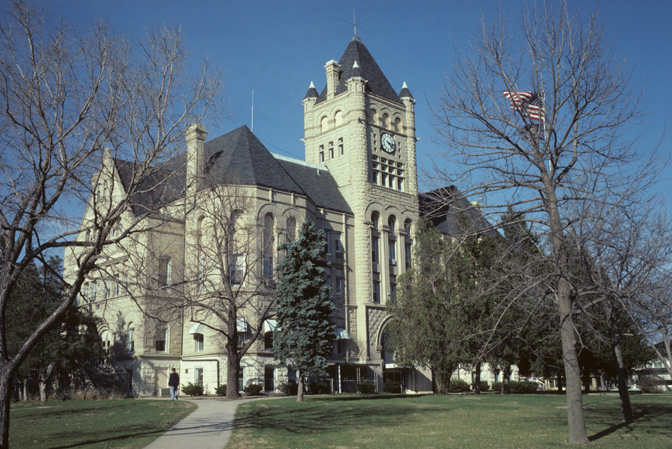
- The Gage County Courthouse in Beatrice in 1976

- Location within the U.S. state of Nebraska
- Coordinates: 40.255234°N 96.683453°W
- Country: United States
- State: Nebraska
- Created: March 16, 1855
- Organized: 1857
- Named for: William D. Gage
- Seat: Beatrice
- Largest city: Beatrice

Area
  - Total: 859.950 sq mi (2,227.26 km^{2})
  - Land: 851.468 sq mi (2,205.29 km^{2})
  - Water: 8.492 sq mi (21.99 km^{2}) 0.99%

Population (2020)
  - Total: 21,704
  - Estimate (2025): 21,711 ▲
  - Density: 25.490/sq mi (9.8418/km^{2})
- Time zone: UTC−6 (Central)
  - Summer (DST): UTC−5 (CDT)
- Area code: 402 and 531
- Congressional district: 3rd
- Website: gagecountyne.gov
- • Nebraska county number 34 • Nebraska license plate prefix 03

Gage County is a county in the U.S. state of Nebraska. As of the 2020 census, the population was 21,704, and was estimated to be 21,711 in 2025. The county seat and the largest city is Beatrice.

Gage County comprises the Beatrice, NE Micropolitan statistical area, which is also in the Lincoln-Beatrice, NE Combined Statistical Area.

In the Nebraska license plate system, Gage County was represented by the prefix "3" (as it had the third-largest number of vehicles registered in the state when the license plate system was established in 1922).

== History ==
Gage county was created on March 16, 1855 and organized in 1857. It was formed from land taken from the Otoe in an 1854 treaty. The county was named for William D. Gage, a Methodist minister who served as the first chaplain of the Nebraska Territorial Legislature.

== Geography ==
According to the United States Census Bureau, the county has a total area of 859.950 square miles (2,227.26 km^{2}), of which 851.468 square miles (2,205.29 km^{2}) is land and 8.492 square miles (21.99 km^{2}) (0.99%) is water. It is the 25th-largest county in Nebraska by total area.

Gage County lies on the southern border of Nebraska, with its southern boundary line abutting the northern border of the state of Kansas. The Big Blue River runs south-southeast through the central part of the county.

=== Major highways ===
- U.S. Highway 77
- U.S. Highway 136
- Nebraska Highway 4
- Nebraska Highway 8
- Nebraska Highway 41
- Nebraska Highway 43
- Nebraska Highway 103
- Nebraska Highway 112

=== Adjacent counties ===
- Lancaster County – north
- Otoe County – northeast
- Johnson County – northeast
- Pawnee County – east
- Marshall County, Kansas – southeast
- Washington County, Kansas – southwest
- Jefferson County – west
- Saline County – northwest

=== Protected areas ===
- Homestead National Monument
- Rockford Lake State Recreation Area

== Demographics ==
Historical population
Census	Pop.	Note	%±
1860	421		—
1870	3,359		697.9%
1880	13,164		291.9%
1890	36,344		176.1%
1900	30,051		−17.3%
1910	30,325		0.9%
1920	29,721		−2.0%
1930	30,242		1.8%
1940	29,588		−2.2%
1950	28,052		−5.2%
1960	26,818		−4.4%
1970	25,731		−4.1%
1980	24,456		−5.0%
1990	22,794		−6.8%
2000	22,993		0.9%
2010	22,311		−3.0%
2020	21,704		−2.7%
2025 (est.)	21,711	▲	0.0%
U.S. Decennial Census; 1790–1960 1900–1990; 1990–2000 2010–2020

=== 2020 census ===
As of the 2020 census, the county had a population of 21,704. The median age was 44.2 years. 22.6% of residents were under the age of 18 and 21.9% of residents were 65 years of age or older. For every 100 females there were 98.6 males, and for every 100 females age 18 and over there were 96.3 males age 18 and over.

The racial makeup of the county was 93.5% White, 0.6% Black or African American, 0.5% American Indian and Alaska Native, 0.5% Asian, 0.0% Native Hawaiian and Pacific Islander, 0.9% from some other race, and 4.0% from two or more races. Hispanic or Latino residents of any race comprised 2.9% of the population.

55.9% of residents lived in urban areas, while 44.1% lived in rural areas.

There were 9,284 households in the county, of which 26.9% had children under the age of 18 living with them and 24.8% had a female householder with no spouse or partner present. About 32.4% of all households were made up of individuals and 15.9% had someone living alone who was 65 years of age or older.

There were 10,327 housing units, of which 10.1% were vacant. Among occupied housing units, 70.3% were owner-occupied and 29.7% were renter-occupied. The homeowner vacancy rate was 2.4% and the rental vacancy rate was 7.6%.

=== 2000 census ===
As of the 2000 census, there were 22,993 people, 9,316 households, and 6,204 families in the county. The population density was 27 people per square mile (10 people/km^{2}). There were 10,030 housing units at an average density of 12 units per square mile (4.6/km^{2}). The racial makeup of the county was 97.69% White, 0.32% Black or African American, 0.58% Native American, 0.28% Asian, 0.03% Pacific Islander, 0.26% from other races, and 0.84% from two or more races. 0.85% of the population were Hispanic or Latino of any race. 56.6% were of German, 6.9% Irish, 6.3% English and 6.3% American ancestry.

There were 9,316 households, out of which 30.30% had children under the age of 18 living with them, 56.70% were married couples living together, 7.10% had a female householder with no husband present, and 33.40% were non-families. 29.20% of all households were made up of individuals, and 15.00% had someone living alone who was 65 years of age or older. The average household size was 2.36 and the average family size was 2.91.

The county population contained 24.00% under the age of 18, 7.70% from 18 to 24, 26.30% from 25 to 44, 22.80% from 45 to 64, and 19.20% who were 65 years of age or older. The median age was 40 years. For every 100 females there were 94.10 males. For every 100 females age 18 and over, there were 91.40 males.

The median income for a household in the county was $34,908, and the median income for a family was $43,072. Males had a median income of $29,680 versus $21,305 for females. The per capita income for the county was $17,190. About 6.60% of families and 8.70% of the population were below the poverty line, including 9.70% of those under age 18 and 8.00% of those age 65 or over.

== Communities ==
=== Cities ===
- Beatrice (county seat)
- Blue Springs
- Wymore

=== Villages ===
- Adams
- Barneston
- Clatonia
- Cortland
- Filley
- Liberty
- Odell
- Pickrell
- Virginia

=== Census-designated place ===
- Holmesville

=== Unincorporated communities ===
- Ellis
- Hoag
- Krider
- Lanham
- Rockford

=== Townships ===
- Adams
- Barneston
- Blakely
- Blue Springs-Wymore
- Clatonia
- Elm
- Filley
- Glenwood
- Grant
- Hanover
- Highland
- Holt
- Hooker
- Island Grove
- Liberty
- Lincoln
- Logan
- Midland
- Nemaha
- Paddock
- Riverside
- Rockford
- Sherman
- Sicily

== Politics ==
Prior to 1940, Gage County was a swing county, backing the national winner in every presidential election from 1900 to 1936. Since then, it has become a Republican stronghold, aside from the 1964 election in which Democrat Lyndon B. Johnson won the county in the midst of his national landslide victory.

United States presidential election results for Gage County, Nebraska
Year	Republican		Democratic		Third party(ies)	
Year	No.	%	No.	%	No.	%
1900	4,141	58.65%	2,701	38.25%	219	3.10%
1904	4,304	69.87%	1,330	21.59%	526	8.54%
1908	3,721	52.78%	3,129	44.38%	200	2.84%
1912	1,336	21.05%	2,593	40.85%	2,419	38.11%
1916	3,383	48.71%	3,385	48.74%	177	2.55%
1920	6,059	68.96%	2,477	28.19%	250	2.85%
1924	5,331	50.70%	3,330	31.67%	1,853	17.62%
1928	8,378	69.83%	3,526	29.39%	94	0.78%
1932	4,315	37.25%	7,036	60.73%	234	2.02%
1936	5,291	41.51%	7,227	56.70%	227	1.78%
1940	8,156	61.55%	5,096	38.45%	0	0.00%
1944	7,352	63.43%	4,238	36.57%	0	0.00%
1948	5,311	56.29%	4,124	43.71%	0	0.00%
1952	8,917	73.87%	3,154	26.13%	0	0.00%
1956	7,514	67.64%	3,595	32.36%	0	0.00%
1960	7,754	66.76%	3,861	33.24%	0	0.00%
1964	4,035	38.63%	6,411	61.37%	0	0.00%
1968	5,465	55.73%	3,704	37.77%	637	6.50%
1972	6,298	63.71%	3,588	36.29%	0	0.00%
1976	5,199	52.54%	4,506	45.54%	190	1.92%
1980	6,089	66.18%	2,259	24.55%	853	9.27%
1984	6,116	68.78%	2,709	30.47%	67	0.75%
1988	5,115	55.68%	4,008	43.63%	63	0.69%
1992	4,006	39.65%	3,315	32.81%	2,783	27.54%
1996	4,413	44.83%	4,008	40.72%	1,422	14.45%
2000	5,538	58.26%	3,516	36.99%	452	4.75%
2004	6,575	63.32%	3,655	35.20%	154	1.48%
2008	5,435	53.49%	4,473	44.03%	252	2.48%
2012	5,513	57.06%	3,903	40.40%	245	2.54%
2016	6,380	63.50%	2,935	29.21%	733	7.29%
2020	7,445	66.96%	3,385	30.44%	289	2.60%
2024	7,523	68.61%	3,242	29.57%	200	1.82%

== See also ==
- National Register of Historic Places listings in Gage County, Nebraska
- Oto Reservation
