= Holt Township, Gage County, Nebraska =

Holt Township
- Township
- Location in Gage County
- Coordinates: 40°23′31″N 096°44′36″W
- Country: United States
- State: Nebraska
- County: Gage

Area
  - Total: 35.90 sq mi (92.99 km^{2})
  - Land: 35.83 sq mi (92.79 km^{2})
  - Water: 0.077 sq mi (0.2 km^{2}) 0.22%
- Elevation: 1,352 ft (412 m)

Population (2020)
  - Total: 458
  - Density: 12.8/sq mi (4.94/km^{2})
- GNIS feature ID: 0838059

Holt Township is one of twenty-four townships in Gage County, Nebraska, United States. The population was 458 at the 2020 census. A 2021 estimate placed the township's population at 458.

The Village of Pickrell lies within the Township.
