= Clatonia, Nebraska =

- Village
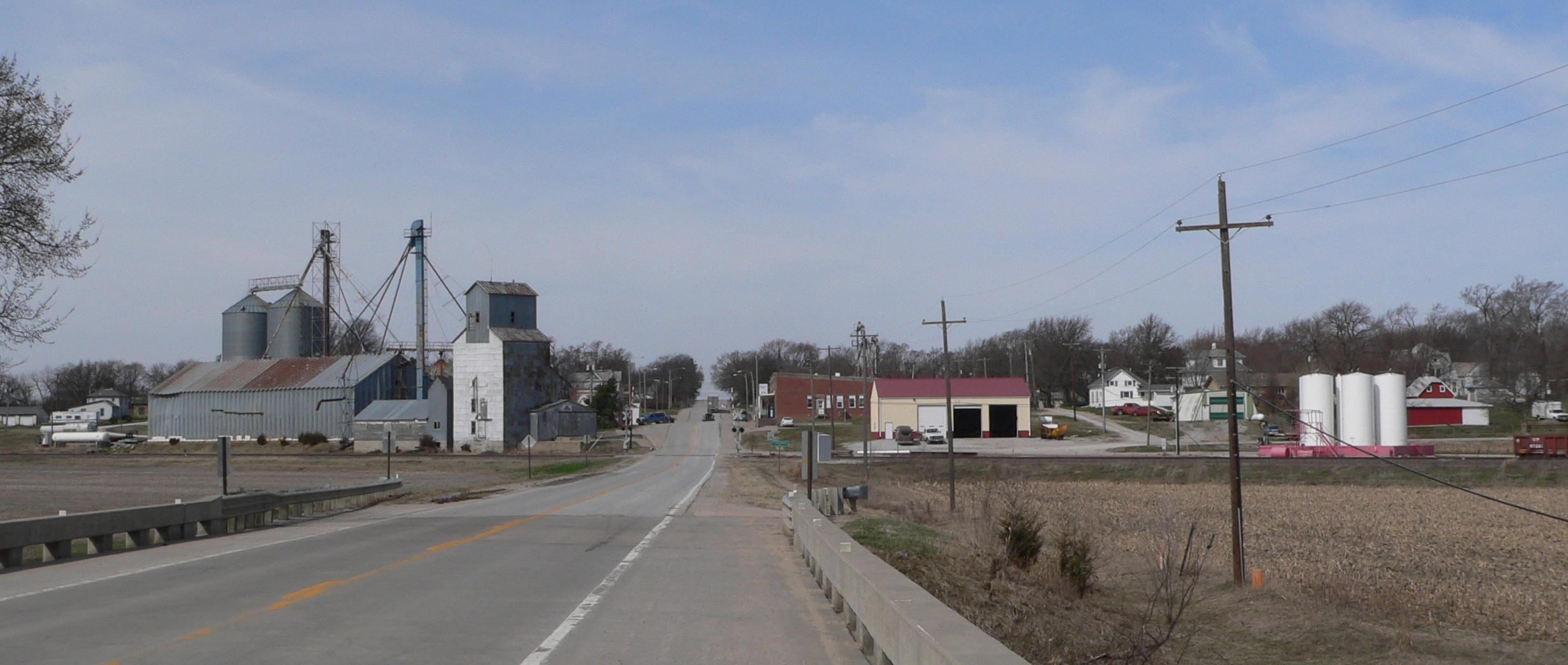
- Clatonia seen from the east along Nebraska Highway 41

- Location of Clatonia, Nebraska

- Location within Nebraska Location within the United States
- Coordinates: 40°27′55″N 96°51′05″W
- Country: United States
- State: Nebraska
- County: Gage
- Township: Clatonia

Area
  - Total: 0.28 sq mi (0.72 km^{2})
  - Land: 0.28 sq mi (0.72 km^{2})
  - Water: 0 sq mi (0.00 km^{2})
- Elevation: 1,385 ft (422 m)

Population (2020)
  - Total: 263
  - Density: 949.3/sq mi (366.51/km^{2})
- Time zone: UTC-6 (Central (CST))
  - Summer (DST): UTC-5 (CDT)
- ZIP code: 68328
- Area code: 402
- FIPS code: 31-09270
- GNIS feature ID: 2397635
- Website: www.villageofclatonia.com

Clatonia is a village in Gage County, Nebraska, United States. The population was 263 at the 2020 census.

== History ==
Clatonia was platted in as a town 1892 when the railroad was extended to that point, although a German settlement had existed at the site since about 1869. Clatonia took its name from Clatonia Creek. The name appears ultimately to be derived from Henry Clay. Clatonia was incorporated as a village in 1893.

== Geography ==
According to the United States Census Bureau, the village has a total area of 0.28 square miles (0.73 km^{2}), all land.

== Demographics ==
Historical population
Census	Pop.	Note	%±
1910	233		—
1920	239		2.6%
1930	242		1.3%
1940	194		−19.8%
1950	192		−1.0%
1960	203		5.7%
1970	224		10.3%
1980	273		21.9%
1990	296		8.4%
2000	275		−7.1%
2010	231		−16.0%
2020	263		13.9%
U.S. Decennial Census

=== 2010 census ===
As of the census of 2010, there were 231 people, 109 households, and 64 families living in the village. The population density was 825.0 inhabitants per square mile (318.5/km^{2}). There were 128 housing units at an average density of 457.1 per square mile (176.5/km^{2}). The racial makeup of the village was 97.8% White, 0.9% Asian, and 1.3% from two or more races. Hispanic or Latino of any race were 0.9% of the population.

There were 109 households, of which 23.9% had children under the age of 18 living with them, 48.6% were married couples living together, 7.3% had a female householder with no husband present, 2.8% had a male householder with no wife present, and 41.3% were non-families. 33.0% of all households were made up of individuals, and 15.6% had someone living alone who was 65 years of age or older. The average household size was 2.12 and the average family size was 2.75.

The median age in the village was 46.2 years. 19% of residents were under the age of 18; 10% were between the ages of 18 and 24; 19.9% were from 25 to 44; 36% were from 45 to 64; and 15.2% were 65 years of age or older. The gender makeup of the village was 52.8% male and 47.2% female.

=== 2000 census ===
As of the census of 2000, there were 275 people, 120 households, and 78 families living in the village. The population density was 1,034.8 inhabitants per square mile (399.5/km^{2}). There were 129 housing units at an average density of 485.4 per square mile (187.4/km^{2}). The racial makeup of the village was 96.73% White, 0.73% Native American, 1.09% Asian, and 1.45% from two or more races. Hispanic or Latino of any race were 0.36% of the population.

There were 120 households, out of which 24.2% had children under the age of 18 living with them, 56.7% were married couples living together, 7.5% had a female householder with no husband present, and 35.0% were non-families. 32.5% of all households were made up of individuals, and 19.2% had someone living alone who was 65 years of age or older. The average household size was 2.29 and the average family size was 2.90.

In the village, the population was spread out, with 24.4% under the age of 18, 5.5% from 18 to 24, 26.9% from 25 to 44, 22.9% from 45 to 64, and 20.4% who were 65 years of age or older. The median age was 42 years. For every 100 females, there were 80.9 males. For every 100 females age 18 and over, there were 85.7 males.

As of 2000 the median income for a household in the village was $33,281, and the median income for a family was $38,929. Males had a median income of $23,750 versus $21,875 for females. The per capita income for the village was $16,386. About 4.8% of families and 7.9% of the population were below the poverty line, including 6.3% of those under the age of eighteen and 15.1% of those 65 or over.
