= Blakely Township, Gage County, Nebraska =

Blakely Township
- Township
- Location in Gage County
- Coordinates: 40°18′18″N 096°51′51″W
- Country: United States
- State: Nebraska
- County: Gage

Area
  - Total: 35.85 sq mi (92.86 km^{2})
  - Land: 35.71 sq mi (92.48 km^{2})
  - Water: 0.15 sq mi (0.39 km^{2}) 0.42%
- Elevation: 1,348 ft (411 m)

Population (2020)
  - Total: 308
  - Density: 8.63/sq mi (3.33/km^{2})
- GNIS feature ID: 0837885

Blakely Township is one of twenty-four townships in Gage County, Nebraska, United States. The population was 308 at the 2020 census. A 2021 estimate placed the township's population at 306.
