= Blue Springs (Marion County, Florida) =

Coordinates: 29.514127°N 81.856198°W

Blue Springs is a spring in Marion County, in the U.S. state of Florida.

It is a third-magnitude spring, found along the southern part of the Ocklawaha River, but is currently submerged by the Rodman Reservoir.

Blue Springs is an English translation of the former Spanish name Las Aguas Azules; both names were given on account of the spring's blue waters.

== See also ==
- List of rivers of Florida
