= Hanover Township, Gage County, Nebraska =

Hanover Township
- Township
- Location in Gage County
- Coordinates: 40°23′59″N 096°38′16″W
- Country: United States
- State: Nebraska
- County: Gage

Area
  - Total: 35.97 sq mi (93.16 km^{2})
  - Land: 35.68 sq mi (92.42 km^{2})
  - Water: 0.29 sq mi (0.74 km^{2}) 0.79%
- Elevation: 1,380 ft (420 m)

Population (2020)
  - Total: 220
  - Density: 6.2/sq mi (2.4/km^{2})
- GNIS feature ID: 0838046

Hanover Township is one of twenty-four townships in Gage County, Nebraska, United States. The population was 220 at the 2020 census. A 2021 estimate placed the township's population at 220.
