= Filley Township, Gage County, Nebraska =

Filley Township
- Township
- Location in Gage County
- Coordinates: 40°18′12″N 096°30′38″W
- Country: United States
- State: Nebraska
- County: Gage

Area
  - Total: 35.77 sq mi (92.64 km^{2})
  - Land: 35.37 sq mi (91.61 km^{2})
  - Water: 0.40 sq mi (1.03 km^{2}) 1.11%
- Elevation: 1,447 ft (441 m)

Population (2020)
  - Total: 292
  - Density: 8.26/sq mi (3.19/km^{2})
- GNIS feature ID: 0838003

Filley Township is one of twenty-four townships in Gage County, Nebraska, United States. The population was 292 at the 2020 census. A 2021 estimate placed the township's population at 292.

The Village of Filley lies within the township.

It was named for Elijah Filley, a pioneer settler.
