= Elm Township, Gage County, Nebraska =

Elm Township
- Township
- Location in Gage County
- Coordinates: 40°08′05″N 096°51′42″W
- Country: United States
- State: Nebraska
- County: Gage

Area
  - Total: 35.90 sq mi (92.98 km^{2})
  - Land: 35.28 sq mi (91.37 km^{2})
  - Water: 0.62 sq mi (1.61 km^{2}) 1.73%
- Elevation: 1,381 ft (421 m)

Population (2020)
  - Total: 140
  - Density: 4.0/sq mi (1.5/km^{2})
- GNIS feature ID: 0837987

Elm Township is one of twenty-four townships in Gage County, Nebraska, United States. The population was 140 at the 2020 census. A 2021 estimate placed the township's population at 140.
