= Pickrell, Nebraska =

- Village
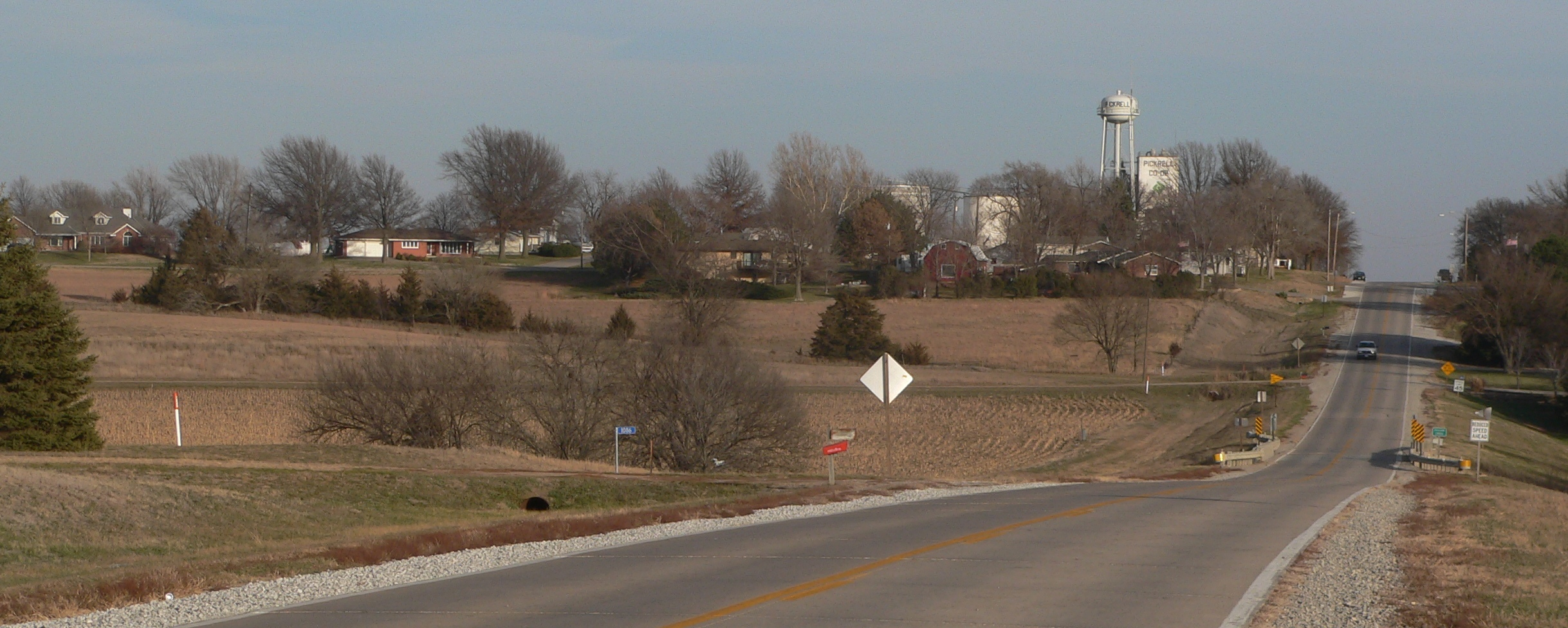
- Pickrell, seen from the west along Pickrell Road

- Location of Pickrell, Nebraska
- Coordinates: 40°22′42″N 96°43′45″W
- Country: United States
- State: Nebraska
- County: Gage

Area
  - Total: 0.11 sq mi (0.28 km^{2})
  - Land: 0.11 sq mi (0.28 km^{2})
  - Water: 0 sq mi (0.00 km^{2})
- Elevation: 1,371 ft (418 m)

Population (2020)
  - Total: 186
  - Density: 1,730.3/sq mi (668.09/km^{2})
- Time zone: UTC-6 (Central (CST))
  - Summer (DST): UTC-5 (CDT)
- ZIP code: 68422
- Area code: 402
- FIPS code: 31-39065
- GNIS feature ID: 2399668

Pickrell is a village in Gage County, Nebraska, United States. As of the 2020 census, the village population was 186.

== History ==
Pickrell was laid out in 1884 when the railroad was extended to that point. It was named for William Pickrell, one of the original owners of the town site. Pickrell was incorporated as a village in 1913.

== Geography ==
According to the United States Census Bureau, the village has a total area of 0.11 square miles (0.28 km^{2}), all land.

== Demographics ==
Historical population
Census	Pop.	Note	%±
1920	160		—
1930	183		14.4%
1940	170		−7.1%
1950	161		−5.3%
1960	130		−19.3%
1970	118		−9.2%
1980	184		55.9%
1990	201		9.2%
2000	182		−9.5%
2010	199		9.3%
2020	186		−6.5%
U.S. Decennial Census

=== 2010 census ===
As of the census of 2010, there were 199 people, 84 households, and 56 families living in the village. The population density was 1,809.1 inhabitants per square mile (698.5/km^{2}). There were 87 housing units at an average density of 790.9 per square mile (305.4/km^{2}). The racial makeup of the village was 97.0% White, 1.0% Native American, 0.5% Asian, and 1.5% from two or more races. Hispanic or Latino of any race were 2.5% of the population.

There were 84 households, of which 32.1% had children under the age of 18 living with them, 59.5% were married couples living together, 7.1% had a female householder with no husband present, and 33.3% were non-families. 29.8% of all households were made up of individuals, and 14.3% had someone living alone who was 65 years of age or older. The average household size was 2.37 and the average family size was 2.95.

The median age in the village was 36.8 years. 28.1% of residents were under the age of 18; 3% were between the ages of 18 and 24; 29.7% were from 25 to 44; 19.5% were from 45 to 64; and 19.6% were 65 years of age or older. The gender makeup of the village was 51.3% male and 48.7% female.

=== 2000 census ===
As of the census of 2000, there were 182 people, 78 households, and 53 families living in the village. The population density was 1,744.4 inhabitants per square mile (673.5/km^{2}). There were 86 housing units at an average density of 824.3 per square mile (318.3/km^{2}). The racial makeup of the village was 99.45% White and 0.55% African American. Hispanic or Latino of any race were 0.55% of the population.

There were 78 households, out of which 24.4% had children under the age of 18 living with them, 62.8% were married couples living together, 2.6% had a female householder with no husband present, and 30.8% were non-families. 23.1% of all households were made up of individuals, and 11.5% had someone living alone who was 65 years of age or older. The average household size was 2.33 and the average family size was 2.74.

In the village, the population was spread out, with 20.9% under the age of 18, 6.6% from 18 to 24, 29.7% from 25 to 44, 26.9% from 45 to 64, and 15.9% who were 65 years of age or older. The median age was 40 years. For every 100 females, there were 95.7 males. For every 100 females age 18 and over, there were 92.0 males.

The median income for a household in the village was $36,250, and the median income for a family was $54,375. Males had a median income of $35,417 versus $23,750 for females. The per capita income for the village was $16,997. None of the families and 9.7% of the population were living below the poverty line, including no under eighteens and 19.4% of those over 64.
