= Island Grove Township, Gage County, Nebraska =

Island Grove Township
- Township
- Location in Gage County
- Coordinates: 40°08′19″N 096°31′44″W
- Country: United States
- State: Nebraska
- County: Gage

Area
  - Total: 35.87 sq mi (92.91 km^{2})
  - Land: 35.86 sq mi (92.88 km^{2})
  - Water: 0.012 sq mi (0.03 km^{2}) 0.03%
- Elevation: 1,316 ft (401 m)

Population (2020)
  - Total: 69
  - Density: 1.9/sq mi (0.74/km^{2})
- GNIS feature ID: 0838070

Island Grove Township is one of twenty-four townships in Gage County, Nebraska, United States. The population was 69 at the 2020 census. A 2021 estimate placed the township's population at 69.

A small portion of the Village of Liberty lies within the Township.
