= Wymore, Nebraska =

- City
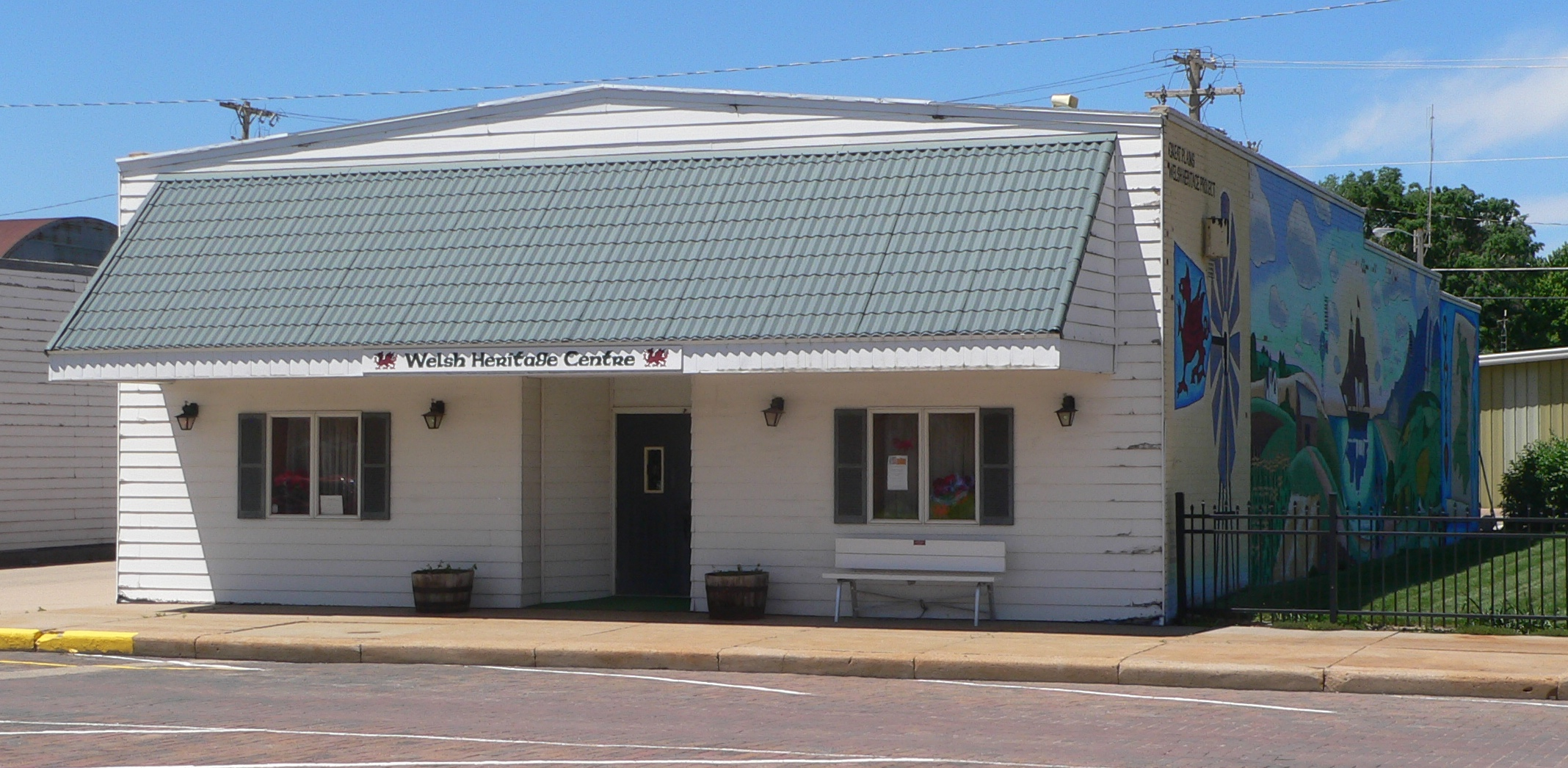
- Welsh Heritage Centre in Wymore

- Location of Wymore within Gage County and Nebraska
- Coordinates: 40°07′20″N 96°39′51″W
- Country: United States
- State: Nebraska
- County: Gage

Area
  - Total: 1.90 sq mi (4.93 km^{2})
  - Land: 1.87 sq mi (4.85 km^{2})
  - Water: 0.031 sq mi (0.08 km^{2})
- Elevation: 1,240 ft (380 m)

Population (2020)
  - Total: 1,377
  - Density: 735.6/sq mi (284.02/km^{2})
- Time zone: UTC-6 (Central (CST))
  - Summer (DST): UTC-5 (CDT)
- ZIP code: 68466
- Area code: 402
- FIPS code: 31-53835
- GNIS feature ID: 2397386
- Website: wymorebluesprings.com

Wymore is a city in Gage County, Nebraska, United States. The population was 1,377 at the 2020 census.

== History ==
Wymore was platted in 1881 as a railroad town, on land donated by Sam Wymore. The "Welsh Capitol of the Great Plains," Wymore became home to generations of immigrants from Wales, who continued their culture in day-to-day life, founding a Welsh-language church, school and cemetery, as well as preserving the Welsh traditions of poetry, dance, and intricate music in minor.

During the early 20th century, Wymore boasted an electric tram. However, by the 1980s the town's population had shrunk and the railroads were used less. The train depot was burned down as part of a firefighting training exercise.

In 2000, the Wymore Welsh Heritage Project was founded to preserve the legacy of these early settlers. It has since expanded to include a museum, an archive of genealogical records, and one of the largest Welsh-language libraries in North America.

Wymore is home to Southern High School, a school that serves students from Barneston, Holmesville, Blue Springs, Wymore, and Liberty. The Raiders, competing in NSAA Class C-2, have won 2 state championships, both in wrestling (1974 and 1980). The Wymore Arbor State baseball ballfield has one of the few covered, behind-the-plate bleachers in the state.

Wymore is also the burial place of author and anthropologist R. Clark Mallam, whose book, Indian Creek Memories; A Sense of Place is set in and around the town.

== Geography ==
According to the United States Census Bureau, the city has a total area of 1.90 square miles (4.92 km^{2}), of which 1.87 square miles (4.84 km^{2}) is land and 0.03 square miles (0.08 km^{2}) is water.

=== Climate ===
Climate data for Wymore, Nebraska (1991-2020 normals)
Month	Jan	Feb	Mar	Apr	May	Jun	Jul	Aug	Sep	Oct	Nov	Dec	Year
Average precipitation inches (mm)	0.80 (20)	0.97 (25)	1.82 (46)	3.11 (79)	4.70 (119)	4.55 (116)	3.85 (98)	3.15 (80)	3.21 (82)	2.31 (59)	1.28 (33)	1.01 (26)	30.76 (783)
Average snowfall inches (cm)	6.6 (17)	3.5 (8.9)	2.1 (5.3)	0.4 (1.0)	0.0 (0.0)	0.0 (0.0)	0.0 (0.0)	0.0 (0.0)	0.0 (0.0)	0.2 (0.51)	1.6 (4.1)	5.3 (13)	19.7 (49.81)
Average precipitation days (≥ 0.01 in)	4	3.7	6.4	8.4	9.2	7.9	8.5	6.9	6.2	6.4	5.3	4.9	77.8
Average snowy days (≥ 0.01 in)	3	1.8	1.1	0.1	0	0	0	0	0	0.1	0.6	2.5	9.2
Source: NOAA

== Demographics ==
Historical population
Census	Pop.	Note	%±
1890	2,420		—
1900	2,626		8.5%
1910	2,613		−0.5%
1920	2,592		−0.8%
1930	2,680		3.4%
1940	2,457		−8.3%
1950	2,258		−8.1%
1960	1,975		−12.5%
1970	1,790		−9.4%
1980	1,841		2.8%
1990	1,611		−12.5%
2000	1,656		2.8%
2010	1,457		−12.0%
2020	1,377		−5.5%
U.S. Decennial Census

=== 2010 census ===
As of the census of 2010, there were 1,457 people, 647 households, and 369 families living in the city. The population density was 779.1 inhabitants per square mile (300.8/km^{2}). There were 755 housing units at an average density of 403.7 per square mile (155.9/km^{2}). The racial makeup of the city was 95.3% White, 0.1% African American, 0.8% Native American, 1.4% from other races, and 2.3% from two or more races. Hispanic or Latino of any race were 2.4% of the population.

There were 647 households, of which 26.4% had children under the age of 18 living with them, 43.6% were married couples living together, 9.6% had a female householder with no husband present, 3.9% had a male householder with no wife present, and 43.0% were non-families. 37.9% of all households were made up of individuals, and 22.1% had someone living alone who was 65 years of age or older. The average household size was 2.18 and the average family size was 2.90.

The median age in the city was 46.8 years. 22.2% of residents were under the age of 18; 5.6% were between the ages of 18 and 24; 19.7% were from 25 to 44; 29.2% were from 45 to 64; and 23.3% were 65 years of age or older. The gender makeup of the city was 46.3% male and 53.7% female.

=== 2000 census ===
As of the census of 2000, there were 1,656 people, 713 households, and 444 families living in the city. The population density was 869.2 inhabitants per square mile (335.6/km^{2}). There were 776 housing units at an average density of 407.3 per square mile (157.3/km^{2}). The racial makeup of the city was 96.68% White, 0.12% African American, 1.51% Native American, 0.42% Asian, 0.12% Pacific Islander, 0.18% from other races, and 0.97% from two or more races. Hispanic or Latino of any race were 1.27% of the population.

There were 713 households, out of which 27.3% had children under the age of 18 living with them, 49.4% were married couples living together, 9.0% had a female householder with no husband present, and 37.7% were non-families. 35.1% of all households were made up of individuals, and 20.6% had someone living alone who was 65 years of age or older. The average household size was 2.25 and the average family size was 2.87.

In the city, the population was spread out, with 23.8% under the age of 18, 7.0% from 18 to 24, 24.2% from 25 to 44, 19.7% from 45 to 64, and 25.4% who were 65 years of age or older. The median age was 42 years. For every 100 females, there were 87.5 males. For every 100 females age 18 and over, there were 84.8 males.

As of 2000 the median income for a household in the city was $25,947, and the median income for a family was $33,150. Males had a median income of $26,200 versus $18,800 for females. The per capita income for the city was $13,978. About 12.2% of families and 13.8% of the population were below the poverty line, including 22.0% of those under age 18 and 7.3% of those age 65 or over.

== Education ==
Wymore Public Schools are part of the Southern School District. There is one elementary school and one high school in the district. The schools are Southern Elementary School and Southern High School. Southern High School is located in Wymore. Chris Prososki is the Superintendent of Schools.

== Attractions ==
The Wymore Welsh Heritage Centre includes the Welsh Language library (cataloged in English as well as Welsh), oral and written histories of early settlers and artifacts of Welsh life in the Great Plains.

The Pleasantview Schoolhouse is a fully restored schoolhouse from the first decade of the 20th century, now a museum. It is home of the bi-annual "Day at a Country School" where students are invited to learn about Welsh heritage and language from teachers attired in traditional Welsh costume.

Bethel Cemetery is the final resting place of many of Wymore's Welsh founders. Many of the tombstones date to the mid-to-late 19th century and bear inscriptions in Welsh.

Wymore's downtown area is paved with brick.

== Notable people ==
- Jake Diekman, (b 1987), baseball player for the New York Mets
- Adam McMullen, (June 12, 1872 – March 2, 1959) was an American Republican politician and was the 21st Governor of Nebraska.
- Esther Pilster, (November 11, 1916 – July 20, 2014), was an educator, principal, activist and philanthropist from Nebraska.
- Dionne Searcey, is an investigative journalist currently working for The New York Times.
- Denny Zager, (b 1944), was a member of rock-pop duo Zager and Evans.
