= Hooker Township, Gage County, Nebraska =

Hooker Township
- Township
- Location in Gage County
- Coordinates: 40°23′36″N 096°31′04″W
- Country: United States
- State: Nebraska
- County: Gage

Area
  - Total: 34.14 sq mi (88.42 km^{2})
  - Land: 33.84 sq mi (87.65 km^{2})
  - Water: 0.30 sq mi (0.77 km^{2}) 0.87%
- Elevation: 1,368 ft (417 m)

Population (2020)
  - Total: 163
  - Density: 4.82/sq mi (1.86/km^{2})
- GNIS feature ID: 0838062

Hooker Township is one of twenty-four townships in Gage County, Nebraska, United States. The population was 163 at the 2020 census. A 2021 estimate placed the township's population at 163.
