= Nemaha Township, Gage County, Nebraska =

Nemaha Township
- Township
- Location in Gage County
- Coordinates: 40°28′38″N 096°37′36″W
- Country: United States
- State: Nebraska
- County: Gage

Area
  - Total: 35.93 sq mi (93.06 km^{2})
  - Land: 35.77 sq mi (92.65 km^{2})
  - Water: 0.16 sq mi (0.41 km^{2}) 0.44%
- Elevation: 1,394 ft (425 m)

Population (2000)
  - Total: 366
  - Density: 10/sq mi (4/km^{2})
- GNIS feature ID: 0838154

Nemaha Township is one of twenty-four townships in Gage County, Nebraska, United States. The population was 366 at the 2000 census. A 2006 estimate placed the township's population at 369.
