= Midland Township, Merrick County, Nebraska =

Midland Township
- Township
- Location in Merrick County
- Coordinates: 41°10′46″N 098°06′22″W
- Country: United States
- State: Nebraska
- County: Merrick

Area
  - Total: 36.13 sq mi (93.57 km^{2})
  - Land: 36.13 sq mi (93.57 km^{2})
  - Water: 0 sq mi (0 km^{2}) 0%
- Elevation: 1,732 ft (528 m)

Population (2020)
  - Total: 193
  - Density: 5.34/sq mi (2.06/km^{2})
- GNIS feature ID: 0838138

Midland Township is one of eleven townships in Merrick County, Nebraska, United States. Its population was 193 at the 2020 census, but a 2021 estimate placed the township's population at 193.

== See also ==
- County government in Nebraska
