= Midland Township, Gage County, Nebraska =

Midland Township
- Township
- Location in Gage County
- Coordinates: 40°18′57″N 096°44′38″W
- Country: United States
- State: Nebraska
- County: Gage

Area
  - Total: 30.69 sq mi (79.49 km^{2})
  - Land: 30.58 sq mi (79.19 km^{2})
  - Water: 0.12 sq mi (0.3 km^{2}) 0.38%
- Elevation: 1,289 ft (393 m)

Population (2020)
  - Total: 361
  - Density: 11.8/sq mi (4.56/km^{2})
- GNIS feature ID: 0838137

Midland Township is one of twenty-four townships in Gage County, Nebraska, United States. The population was 361 at the 2020 census. A 2021 estimate placed the township's population at 361.
