= Blue Springs, Nebraska =

- City
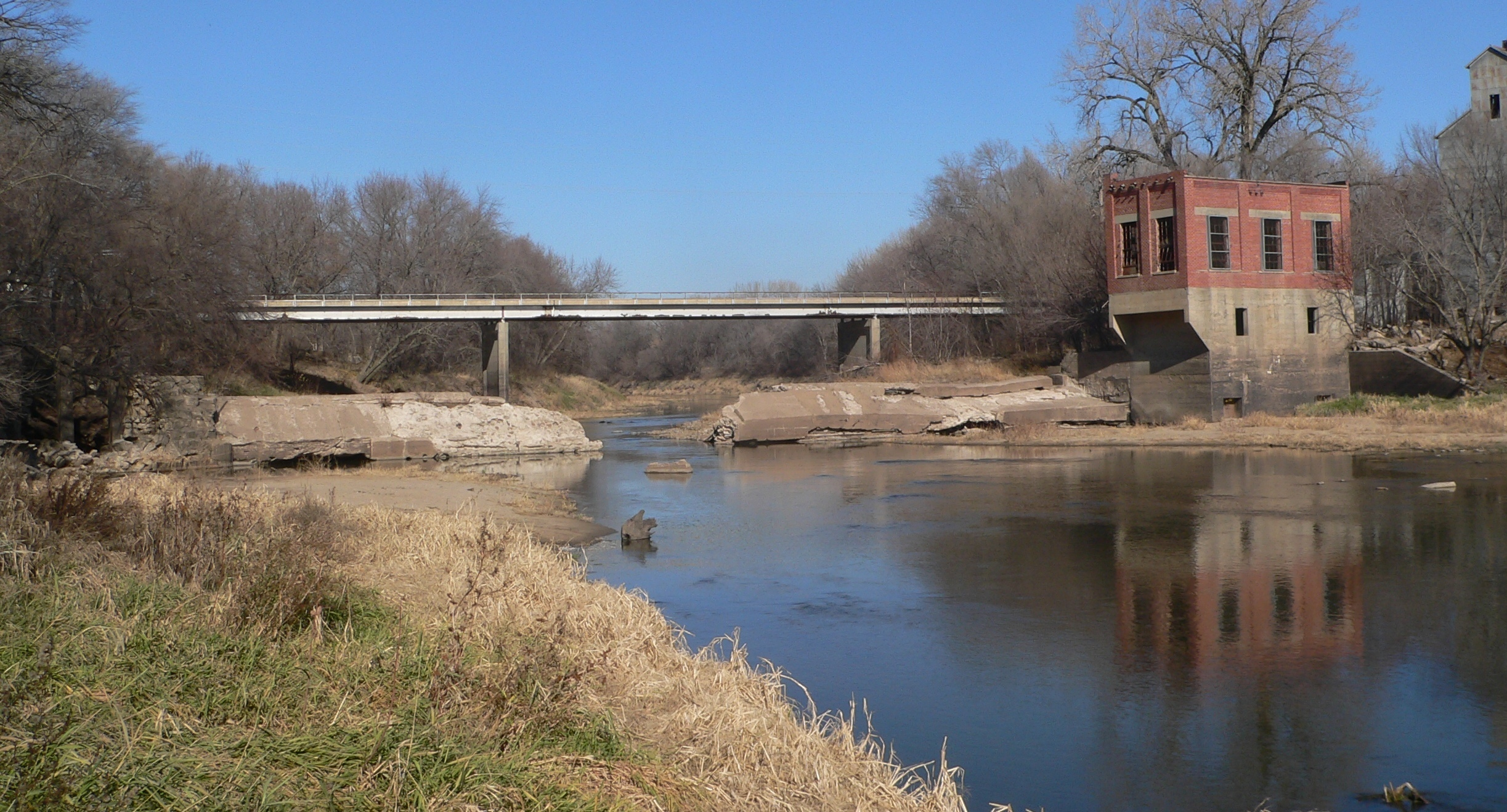
- Remains of dam and hydroelectric power plant, below Broad Street bridge, on Big Blue River at Blue Springs

- Location of Blue Springs within Gage County and Nebraska
- Coordinates: 40°08′15″N 96°39′47″W
- Country: United States
- State: Nebraska
- County: Gage

Area
  - Total: 0.78 sq mi (2.03 km^{2})
  - Land: 0.77 sq mi (1.99 km^{2})
  - Water: 0.019 sq mi (0.05 km^{2})
- Elevation: 1,250 ft (380 m)

Population (2020)
  - Total: 282
  - Density: 370/sq mi (142/km^{2})
- Time zone: UTC-6 (Central (CST))
  - Summer (DST): UTC-5 (CDT)
- ZIP code: 68318
- Area code: 402
- FIPS code: 31-05630
- GNIS feature ID: 2394207
- Website: http://www.bluespringsne.com/

Blue Springs is a city in Gage County, Nebraska, United States. The population was 282 at the 2020 census, which makes it the least populated city in Nebraska.

== History ==
Blue Springs was founded in the 1850s. It was named for the local springs, long thought by Native Americans thought to hold medicinal powers.

The first post office in Blue Springs was established in 1861.

== Geography ==
According to the United States Census Bureau, the village has a total area of 0.79 square miles (2.05 km^{2}), of which 0.77 square miles (1.99 km^{2}) is land and 0.02 square miles (0.05 km^{2}) is water.

== Demographics ==
Historical population
Census	Pop.	Note	%±
1880	513		—
1890	963		87.7%
1900	786		−18.4%
1910	712		−9.4%
1920	742		4.2%
1930	700		−5.7%
1940	681		−2.7%
1950	581		−14.7%
1960	509		−12.4%
1970	506		−0.6%
1980	521		3.0%
1990	431		−17.3%
2000	383		−11.1%
2010	331		−13.6%
2020	282		−14.8%
U.S. Decennial Census; 2012 Estimate

=== 2010 census ===
As of the census of 2010, there were 331 people, 147 households, and 97 families living in the village. The population density was 429.9 inhabitants per square mile (166.0/km^{2}). There were 172 housing units at an average density of 223.4 per square mile (86.3/km^{2}). The racial makeup of the village was 95.2% White, 1.2% Native American, 1.5% from other races, and 2.1% from two or more races. Hispanic or Latino of any race were 2.7% of the population.

There were 147 households, of which 25.2% had children under the age of 18 living with them, 49.7% were married couples living together, 6.1% had a female householder with no husband present, 10.2% had a male householder with no wife present, and 34.0% were non-families. 26.5% of all households were made up of individuals, and 12.2% had someone living alone who was 65 years of age or older. The average household size was 2.25 and the average family size was 2.65.

The median age in the village was 49.3 years. 19.9% of residents were under the age of 18; 6.2% were between the ages of 18 and 24; 15.6% were from 25 to 44; 35.1% were from 45 to 64; and 23% were 65 years of age or older. The gender makeup of the village was 49.8% male and 50.2% female.

=== 2000 census ===
As of the census of 2000, there were 383 people, 166 households, and 111 families living in the village. The population density was 485.6 inhabitants per square mile (187.5/km^{2}). There were 181 housing units at an average density of 229.5 per square mile (88.6/km^{2}). The racial makeup of the village was 95.30% White, 3.13% Native American, 0.26% Pacific Islander, and 1.31% from two or more races. Hispanic or Latino of any race were 0.26% of the population.

There were 166 households, out of which 29.5% had children under the age of 18 living with them, 54.8% were married couples living together, 6.6% had a female householder with no husband present, and 33.1% were non-families. 30.1% of all households were made up of individuals, and 13.9% had someone living alone who was 65 years of age or older. The average household size was 2.31 and the average family size was 2.84.

In the village, the population was spread out, with 24.0% under the age of 18, 6.5% from 18 to 24, 25.6% from 25 to 44, 27.7% from 45 to 64, and 16.2% who were 65 years of age or older. The median age was 42 years. For every 100 females, there were 104.8 males. For every 100 females age 18 and over, there were 103.5 males.

As of 2000 the median income for a household in the village was $25,000, and the median income for a family was $36,563. Males had a median income of $28,000 versus $17,614 for females. The per capita income for the village was $14,269. About 17.1% of families and 18.4% of the population were below the poverty line, including 30.5% of those under age 18 and 3.5% of those age 65 or over.

== Education ==
Blue Springs Public Schools are part of the Southern School District, which includes one elementary school (Southern Elementary School, located in Blue Springs) and one high school, Southern High School.

== Notable person ==
Guy Chamberlin, member of College Football Hall of Fame and Pro Football Hall of Fame
