= Liberty, Nebraska =

- Village
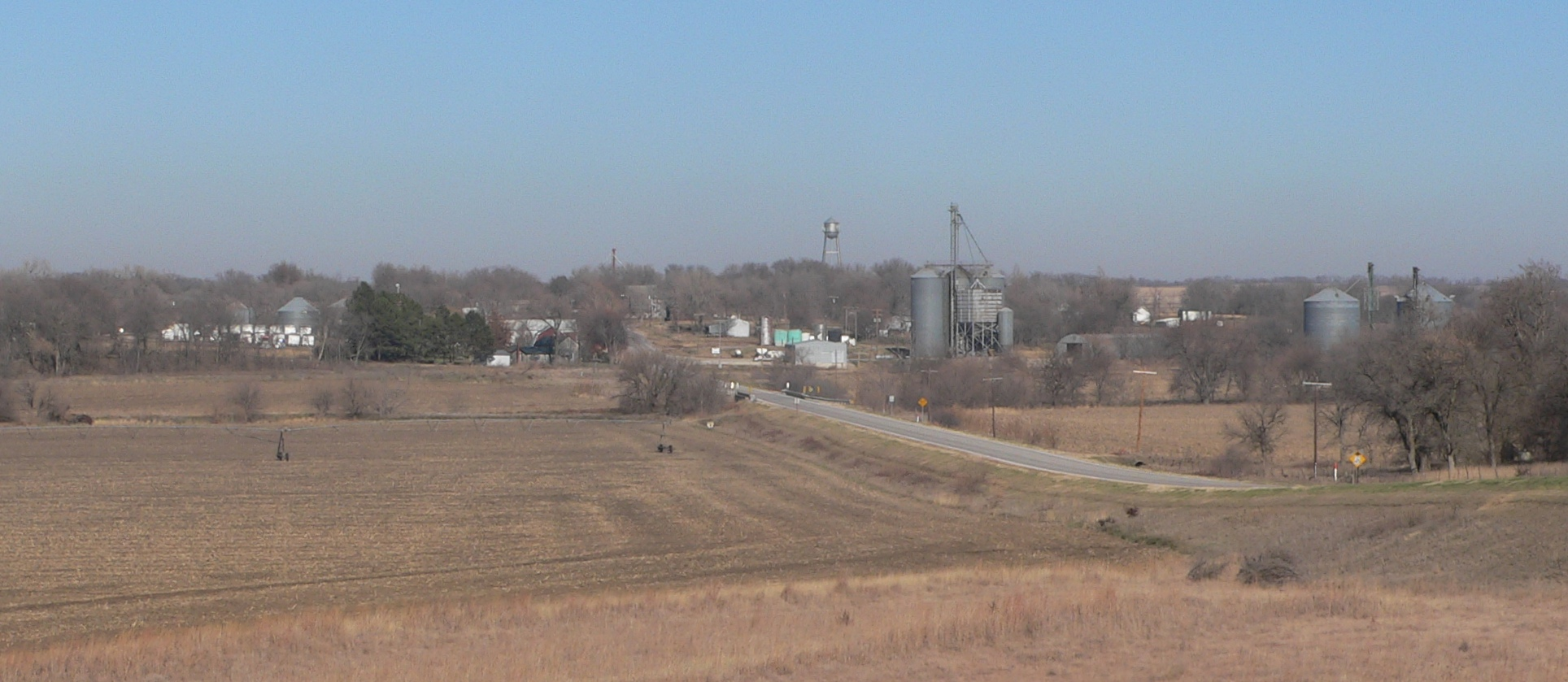
- Liberty, seen from the south-southwest along State Spur 34A

- Location of Liberty, Nebraska
- Coordinates: 40°05′08″N 96°28′59″W
- Country: United States
- State: Nebraska
- County: Gage

Area
  - Total: 0.25 sq mi (0.64 km^{2})
  - Land: 0.25 sq mi (0.64 km^{2})
  - Water: 0 sq mi (0.00 km^{2})
- Elevation: 1,306 ft (398 m)

Population (2020)
  - Total: 37
  - Density: 150.1/sq mi (57.94/km^{2})
- Time zone: UTC-6 (Central (CST))
  - Summer (DST): UTC-5 (CDT)
- ZIP code: 68381
- Area code: 402
- FIPS code: 31-26980
- GNIS feature ID: 2398434

Liberty is a village in Gage County, Nebraska, United States. The population was 37 at the 2020 census.

== Geography ==
According to the United States Census Bureau, the village has a total area of 0.25 square miles (0.65 km^{2}), all land.

== Demographics ==
Historical population
Census	Pop.	Note	%±
1880	27		—
1890	469		1,637.0%
1900	450		−4.1%
1910	394		−12.4%
1920	375		−4.8%
1930	348		−7.2%
1940	340		−2.3%
1950	246		−27.6%
1960	174		−29.3%
1970	118		−32.2%
1980	105		−11.0%
1990	74		−29.5%
2000	86		16.2%
2010	76		−11.6%
2020	37		−51.3%
U.S. Decennial Census

=== 2010 census ===
As of the census of 2010, there were 76 people, 29 households, and 20 families living in the village. The population density was 304.0 inhabitants per square mile (117.4/km^{2}). There were 36 housing units at an average density of 144.0 per square mile (55.6/km^{2}). The racial makeup of the village was 98.7% White and 1.3% from two or more races.

There were 29 households, of which 31.0% had children under the age of 18 living with them, 55.2% were married couples living together, 6.9% had a female householder with no husband present, 6.9% had a male householder with no wife present, and 31.0% were non-families. 31.0% of all households were made up of individuals, and 10.3% had someone living alone who was 65 years of age or older. The average household size was 2.62 and the average family size was 3.25.

The median age in the village was 37.5 years. 32.9% of residents were under the age of 18; 3.9% were between the ages of 18 and 24; 18.4% were from 25 to 44; 34.1% were from 45 to 64; and 10.5% were 65 years of age or older. The gender makeup of the village was 51.3% male and 48.7% female.

=== 2000 census ===
As of the census of 2000, there were 86 people, 34 households, and 24 families living in the village. The population density was 348.0 inhabitants per square mile (134.4/km^{2}). There were 39 housing units at an average density of 157.8 per square mile (60.9/km^{2}). The racial makeup of the village was 93.02% White, 3.49% Native American, 1.16% from other races, and 2.33% from two or more races. Hispanic or Latino of any race were 3.49% of the population.

There were 34 households, out of which 32.4% had children under the age of 18 living with them, 58.8% were married couples living together, 8.8% had a female householder with no husband present, and 29.4% were non-families. 26.5% of all households were made up of individuals, and 8.8% had someone living alone who was 65 years of age or older. The average household size was 2.53 and the average family size was 2.83.

In the village, the population was spread out, with 29.1% under the age of 18, 4.7% from 18 to 24, 24.4% from 25 to 44, 26.7% from 45 to 64, and 15.1% who were 65 years of age or older. The median age was 40 years. For every 100 females, there were 95.5 males. For every 100 females age 18 and over, there were 90.6 males.

As of 2000 the median income for a household in the village was $18,750, and the median income for a family was $22,813. Males had a median income of $19,583 versus $16,250 for females. The per capita income for the village was $10,793. There were no families and 3.5% of the population living below the poverty line, including no under eighteens and 7.7% of those over 64.

== History ==
The area that would eventually become Liberty was being settled by whites as early as 1855. The town itself was founded by early settler David Palmer (1838-1876), who ran a trading post in the area. Palmer drowned in a nearby river and was buried in the Liberty Cemetery. The town also grew from the influx of railroad laborers who built the tracks that went through the village. In its heyday in 1890, Liberty had a population of 469, enough to support three grocery stores, a meat market, a livery, a dry goods store, a hotel, a law office, a hardware store, an undertaker, a lumber yard and barbershops, and its own newspaper, The Liberty Journal. But the money panic of 1893 hit the village particularly hard, and it never recovered from the shock of many farmers selling what they could and leaving town.

== Notable person ==
- Kenneth S. Wherry, U.S. Senator from Nebraska 1943–51; Senate Republican Leader
