= Sicily Township, Gage County, Nebraska =

Sicily Township
- Township
- Location in Gage County
- Coordinates: 40°08′22″N 096°44′44″W
- Country: United States
- State: Nebraska
- County: Gage

Area
  - Total: 36.17 sq mi (93.69 km^{2})
  - Land: 35.96 sq mi (93.14 km^{2})
  - Water: 0.21 sq mi (0.54 km^{2}) 0.58%
- Elevation: 1,342 ft (409 m)

Population (2020)
  - Total: 185
  - Density: 5.14/sq mi (1.99/km^{2})
- GNIS feature ID: 0838252

Sicily Township is one of twenty-four townships in Gage County, Nebraska, United States. The population was 185 at the 2020 census. A 2021 estimate placed the township's population at 185.
