= Odell, Nebraska =

- Village
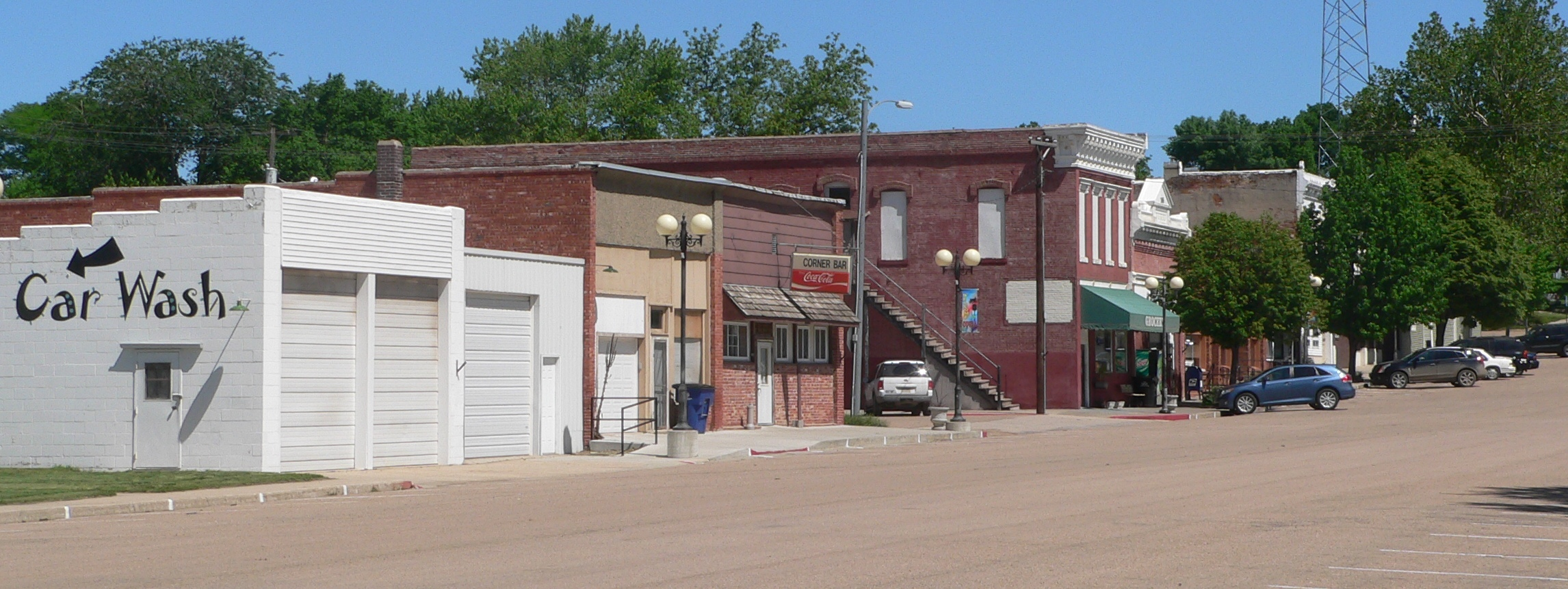
- Downtown Odell: Main Street

- Location of Odell, Nebraska
- Coordinates: 40°03′01″N 96°48′06″W
- Country: United States
- State: Nebraska
- County: Gage

Area
  - Total: 0.26 sq mi (0.68 km^{2})
  - Land: 0.26 sq mi (0.68 km^{2})
  - Water: 0 sq mi (0.00 km^{2})
- Elevation: 1,309 ft (399 m)

Population (2020)
  - Total: 260
  - Density: 988.3/sq mi (381.58/km^{2})
- Time zone: UTC-6 (Central (CST))
  - Summer (DST): UTC-5 (CDT)
- ZIP code: 68415
- Area code: 402
- FIPS code: 31-35735
- GNIS feature ID: 2399559
- Website: odellnebraska.com

Odell is a village in Gage County, Nebraska, United States. The population was 260 at the 2020 census.

== History ==
Before the southwest corner of Gage County was home to Odell, it was part of the 10-by-25-mile (16 by 40 km) Otoe Indian Reservation.

Odell was laid out in 1880 when the railroad was extended to that point. The community was named after LeGrand Odell, an original owner of the town site.

== Geography ==
According to the United States Census Bureau, the village has a total area of 0.26 square miles (0.67 km^{2}), all land.

== Demographics ==
Historical population
Census	Pop.	Note	%±
1900	359		—
1910	427		18.9%
1920	403		−5.6%
1930	472		17.1%
1940	404		−14.4%
1950	420		4.0%
1960	358		−14.8%
1970	349		−2.5%
1980	322		−7.7%
1990	291		−9.6%
2000	345		18.6%
2010	307		−11.0%
2020	260		−15.3%
U.S. Decennial Census

=== 2010 census ===
As of the census of 2010, there were 307 people, 133 households, and 90 families living in the village. The population density was 1,180.8 inhabitants per square mile (455.9/km^{2}). There were 143 housing units at an average density of 550.0 per square mile (212.4/km^{2}). The racial makeup of the village was 97.4% White, 1.0% from other races, and 1.6% from two or more races.

There were 133 households, of which 30.1% had children under the age of 18 living with them, 55.6% were married couples living together, 9.8% had a female householder with no husband present, 2.3% had a male householder with no wife present, and 32.3% were non-families. 30.1% of all households were made up of individuals, and 15% had someone living alone who was 65 years of age or older. The average household size was 2.31 and the average family size was 2.82.

The median age in the village was 44.6 years. 26.4% of residents were under the age of 18; 2.9% were between the ages of 18 and 24; 21.2% were from 25 to 44; 26.7% were from 45 to 64; and 22.8% were 65 years of age or older. The gender makeup of the village was 49.8% male and 50.2% female.

=== 2000 census ===
As of the census of 2000, there were 345 people, 142 households, and 100 families living in the village. The population density was 1,308.0 inhabitants per square mile (505.0/km^{2}). There were 152 housing units at an average density of 576.3 per square mile (222.5/km^{2}). The racial makeup of the village was 97.97% White and 2.03% Native American. Hispanic or Latino of any race were 1.45% of the population.

There were 142 households, out of which 36.6% had children under the age of 18 living with them, 54.9% were married couples living together, 12.7% had a female householder with no husband present, and 28.9% were non-families. 28.2% of all households were made up of individuals, and 14.1% had someone living alone who was 65 years of age or older. The average household size was 2.43 and the average family size was 2.93.

In the village, the population was spread out, with 28.4% under the age of 18, 7.5% from 18 to 24, 22.6% from 25 to 44, 20.0% from 45 to 64, and 21.4% who were 65 years of age or older. The median age was 39 years. For every 100 females, there were 104.1 males. For every 100 females age 18 and over, there were 94.5 males.

As of 2000 the median income for a household in the village was $30,875, and the median income for a family was $32,813. Males had a median income of $25,833 versus $23,250 for females. The per capita income for the village was $13,958. About 3.0% of families and 6.3% of the population were below the poverty line, including 4.7% of those under age 18 and 3.8% of those age 65 or over.

== Education ==
The town is home to Diller-Odell High, which competes in the Pioneer Conference.
