= Barneston, Nebraska =

- Village
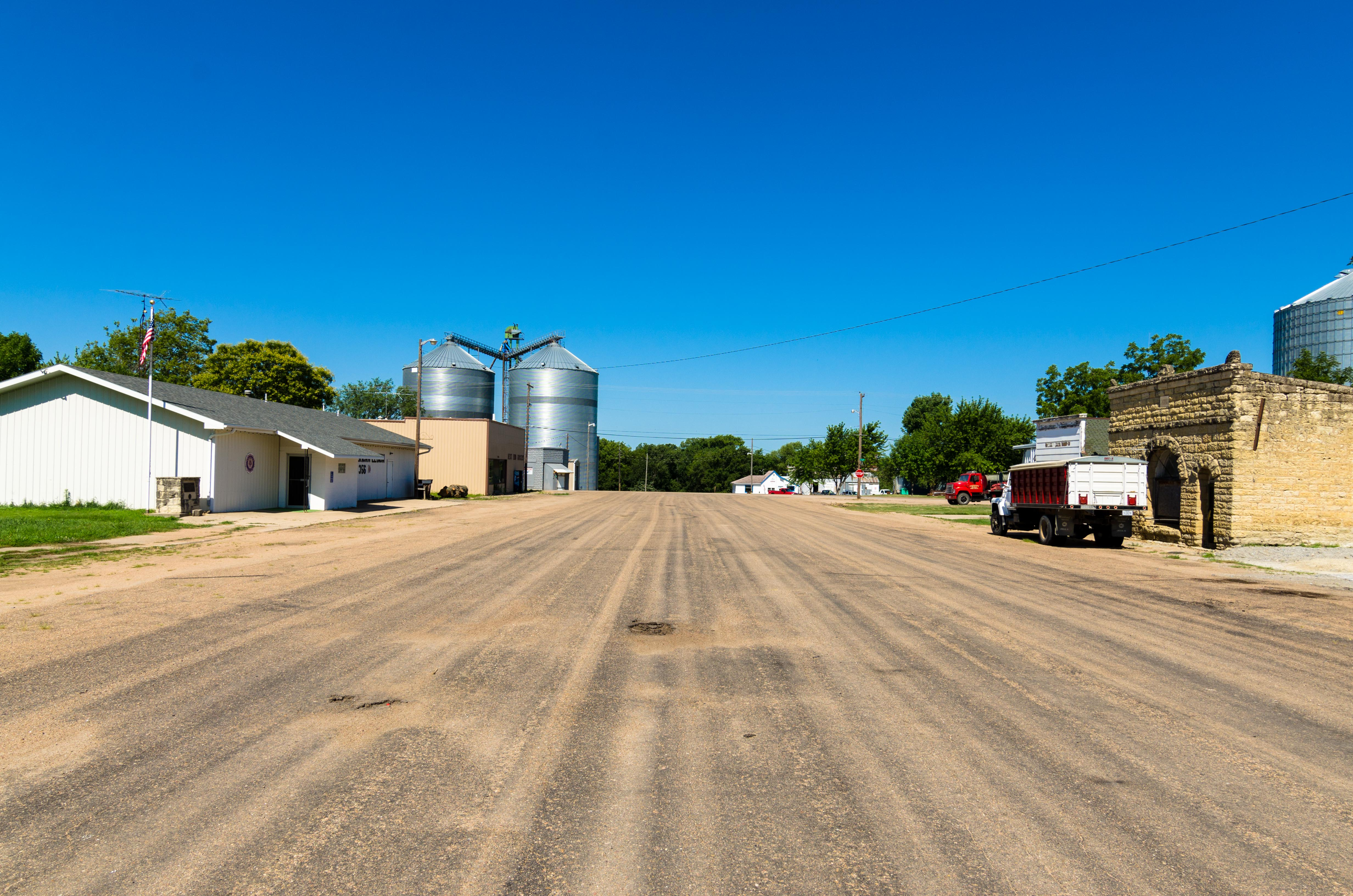

- Location of Barneston, Nebraska
- Coordinates: 40°02′55″N 96°34′25″W
- Country: United States
- State: Nebraska
- County: Gage

Area
  - Total: 0.25 sq mi (0.64 km^{2})
  - Land: 0.24 sq mi (0.63 km^{2})
  - Water: 0 sq mi (0.00 km^{2})
- Elevation: 1,207 ft (368 m)

Population (2020)
  - Total: 90
  - Density: 368/sq mi (142.2/km^{2})
- Time zone: UTC-6 (Central (CST))
  - Summer (DST): UTC-5 (CDT)
- ZIP code: 68309
- Area code: 402
- FIPS code: 31-03075
- GNIS feature ID: 2398033

Barneston is a village in Gage County, Nebraska, United States. The population was 90 at the 2020 census.

== History ==
The present-day town of Barneston was settled at the site of one of the largest Oto villages in the 19th century. The agency and a trading post were located there. Barneston was founded by a French fur trapper who was married to an Oto woman.

Barnestown was platted in 1884 when the Marysville and Blue Valley Railroad was extended to that point. The community was named after Francis M. Barnes, an early settler.

== Geography ==
According to the United States Census Bureau, the village has a total area of 0.24 square miles (0.62 km^{2}), all land.

=== Climate ===
Climate data for Barneston, Nebraska (coordinates:40.0489°N 96.5747°W, 1991-2020)
Month	Jan	Feb	Mar	Apr	May	Jun	Jul	Aug	Sep	Oct	Nov	Dec	Year
Average precipitation inches (mm)	0.52 (13)	0.90 (23)	2.22 (56)	2.96 (75)	5.16 (131)	4.97 (126)	4.36 (111)	3.46 (88)	3.30 (84)	2.46 (62)	1.43 (36)	0.71 (18)	32.45 (823)
Average snowfall inches (cm)	4.6 (12)	3.1 (7.9)	2.1 (5.3)	1.3 (3.3)	0.0 (0.0)	0.0 (0.0)	0.0 (0.0)	0.0 (0.0)	0.0 (0.0)	0.4 (1.0)	0.7 (1.8)	3.3 (8.4)	15.5 (39.7)
Average precipitation days (≥ 0.01 in)	3.4	2.9	5.2	7.2	8.2	6.7	7.1	5.8	5.4	4.6	4.5	2.4	63.4
Average snowy days (≥ 0.01 in)	2.7	1.4	0.7	0.2	0	0	0	0	0	0.1	0.7	1.5	7.3
Source: NOAA

== Demographics ==
Historical population
Census	Pop.	Note	%±
1900	250		—
1910	228		−8.8%
1920	258		13.2%
1930	221		−14.3%
1940	219		−0.9%
1950	208		−5.0%
1960	177		−14.9%
1970	149		−15.8%
1980	155		4.0%
1990	122		−21.3%
2000	122		0.0%
2010	116		−4.9%
2020	90		−22.4%
U.S. Decennial Census

=== 2010 census ===
As of the census of 2010, there were 116 people, 48 households, and 28 families living in the village. The population density was 483.3 inhabitants per square mile (186.6/km^{2}). There were 55 housing units at an average density of 229.2 per square mile (88.5/km^{2}). The racial makeup of the village was 93.1% White and 6.9% from two or more races. Hispanic or Latino of any race were 8.6% of the population.

There were 48 households, of which 22.9% had children under the age of 18 living with them, 45.8% were married couples living together, 8.3% had a female householder with no husband present, 4.2% had a male householder with no wife present, and 41.7% were non-families. 33.3% of all households were made up of individuals, and 14.6% had someone living alone who was 65 years of age or older. The average household size was 2.42 and the average family size was 3.04.

The median age in the village was 45 years. 20.7% of residents were under the age of 18; 8.6% were between the ages of 18 and 24; 20.7% were from 25 to 44; 37.1% were from 45 to 64; and 12.9% were 65 years of age or older. The gender makeup of the village was 47.4% male and 52.6% female.

=== 2000 census ===
As of the census of 2000, there were 122 people, 49 households, and 31 families living in the village. The population density was 515.9 inhabitants per square mile (199.2/km^{2}). There were 57 housing units at an average density of 241.0 per square mile (93.1/km^{2}). The racial makeup of the village was 99.18% White and 0.82% Native American. Other races including Hispanics or Latinos were 3.28% of the population.

There were 49 households, out of which 34.7% had children under the age of 18 living with them, 59.2% were married couples living together, 2.0% had a female householder with no husband present, and 36.7% were non-families. 28.6% of all households were made up of individuals, and 16.3% had someone living alone who was 65 years of age or older. The average household size was 2.49 and the average family size was 3.13.

In the village, the population was spread out, with 27.9% under the age of 18, 3.3% from 18 to 24, 25.4% from 25 to 44, 26.2% from 45 to 64, and 17.2% who were 65 years of age or older. The median age was 40 years. For every 100 females, there were 96.8 males. For every 100 females age 18 and over, there were 104.7 males.

As of 2000 the median income for a household in the village was $33,750, and the median income for a family was $40,625. Males had a median income of $31,429 versus $18,750 for females. The per capita income for the village was $13,255. There were 10.3% of families and 14.2% of the population living below the poverty line, including 6.8% of under eighteens and 23.5% of those over 64.

== See also ==
- Oto Reservation
