= List of census-designated places in Nebraska by population =

Map of the United States with Nebraska highlighted

Nebraska is a state located in the Midwestern United States that is divided into 93 counties and contains 50 census-designated places (CDPs). All population data is based on the 2010 census.

== Census-designated places ==
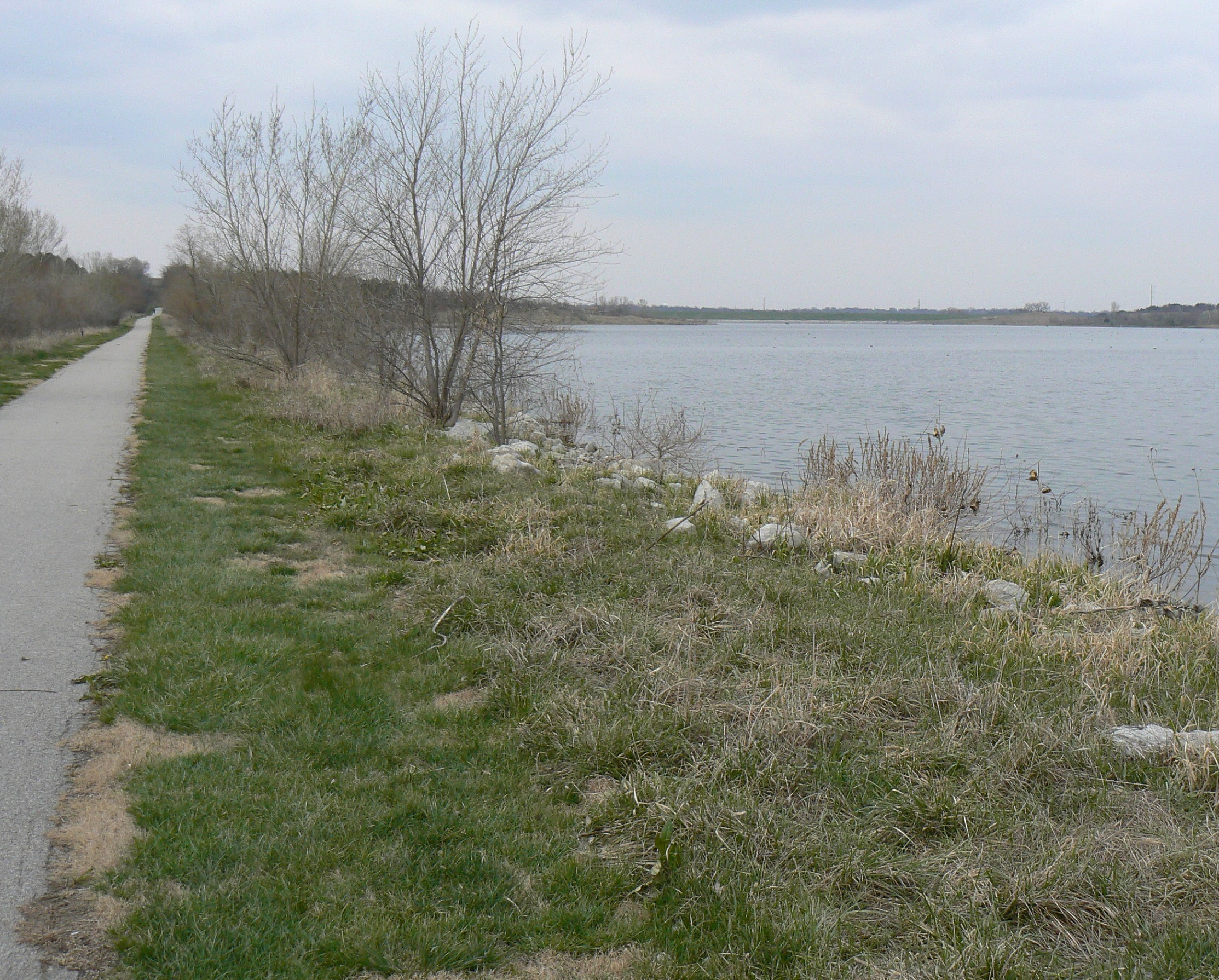
Wehrspann Lake in Chalco Hills Recreation Area

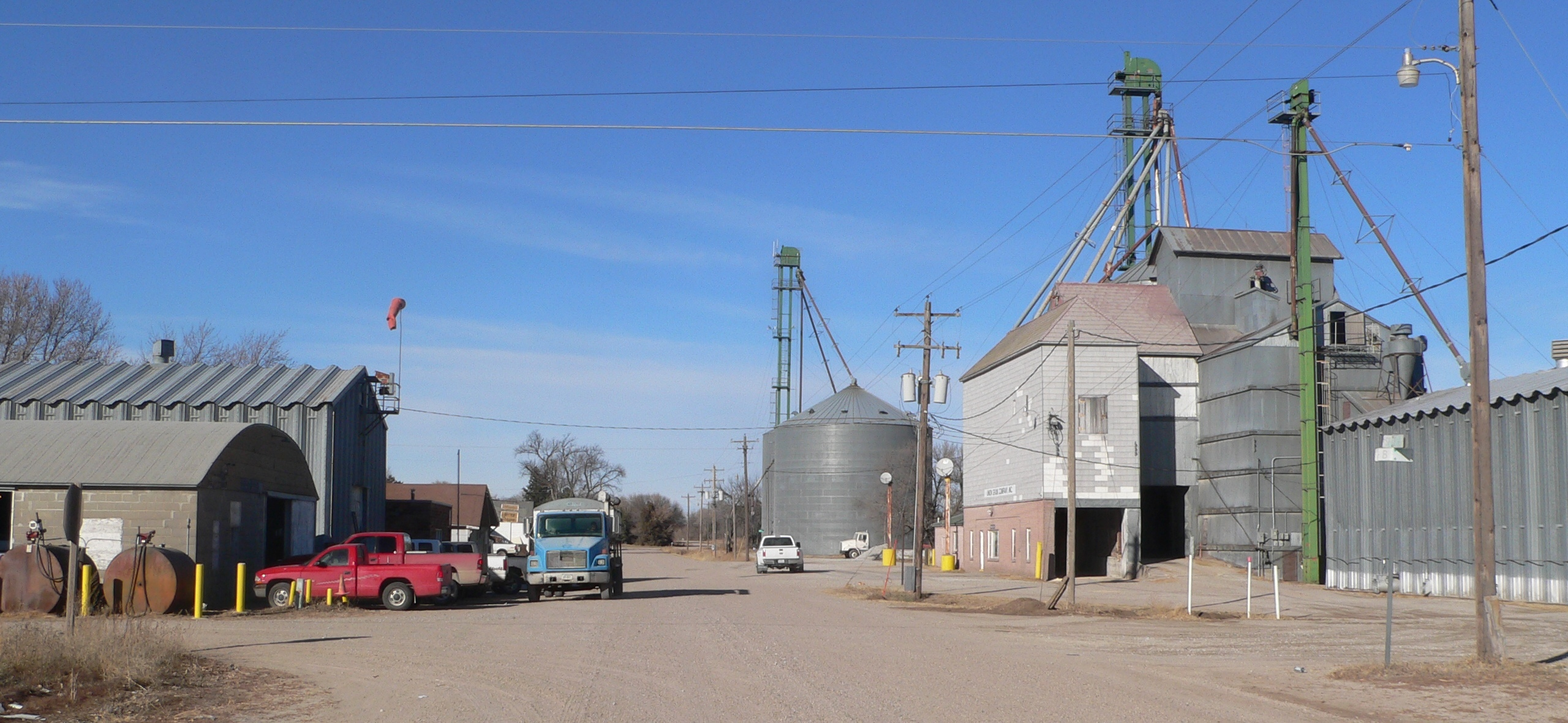
Spruce Street in St. Libory

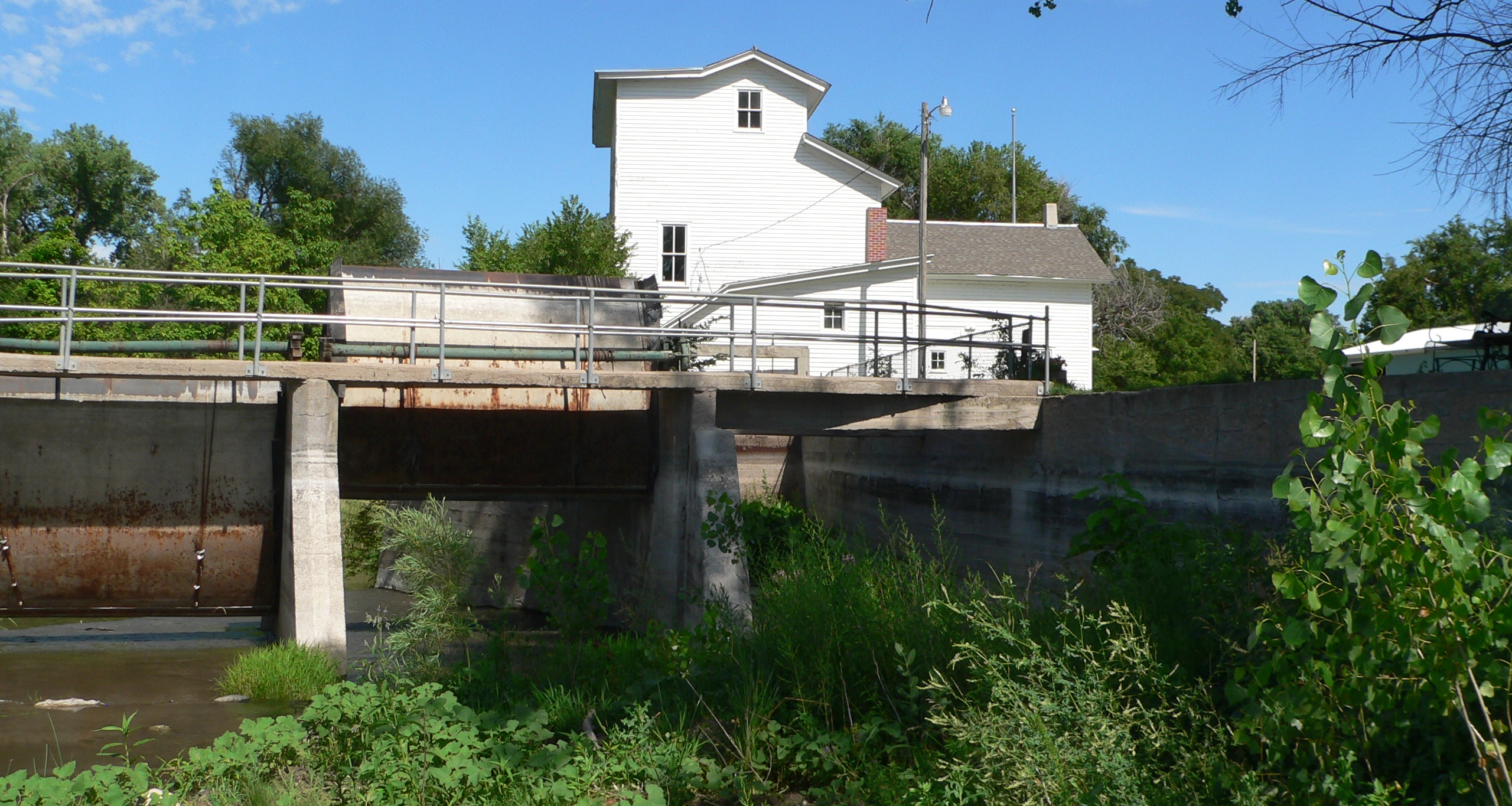
Champion Mill and dam in Champion

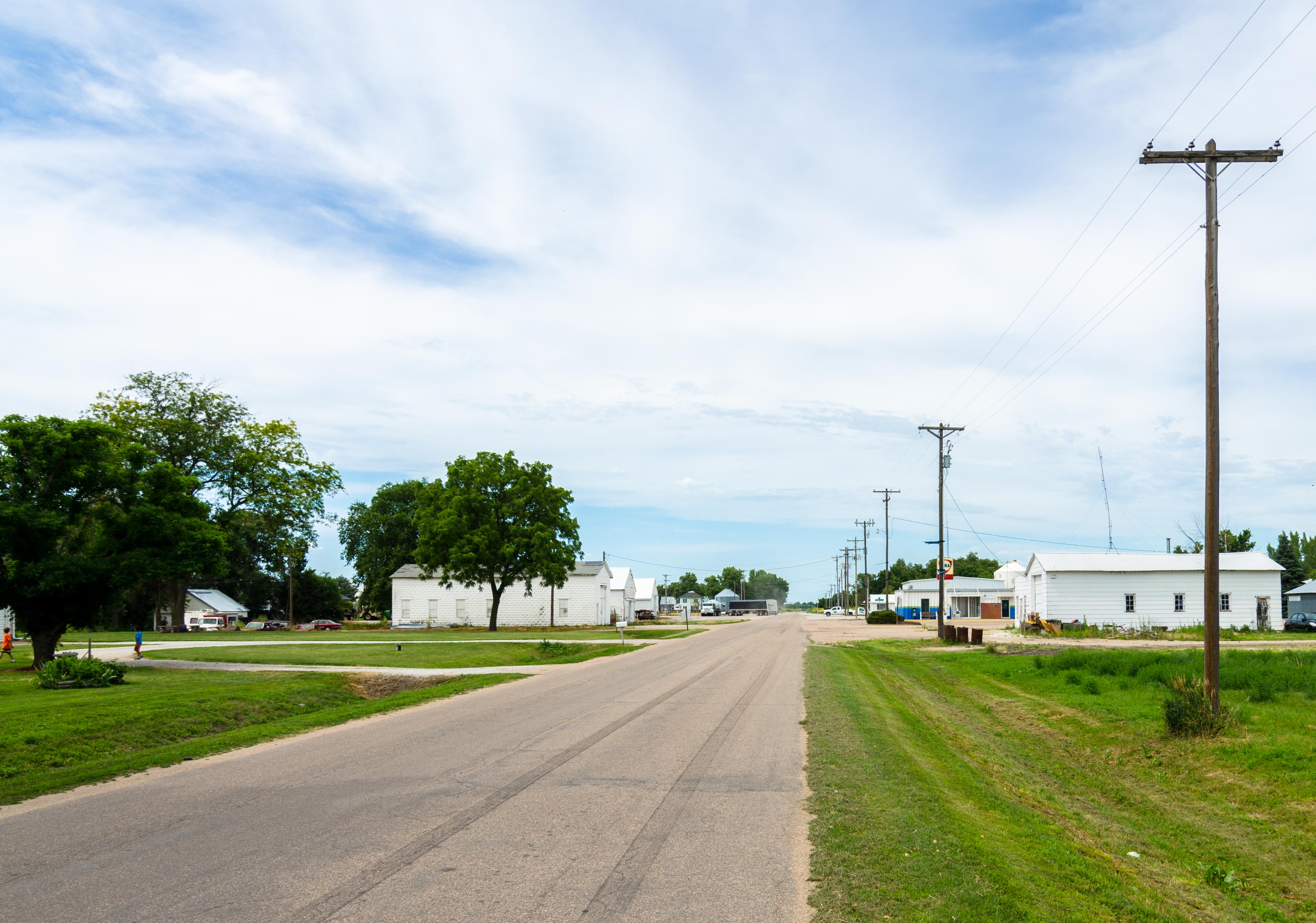
Archer

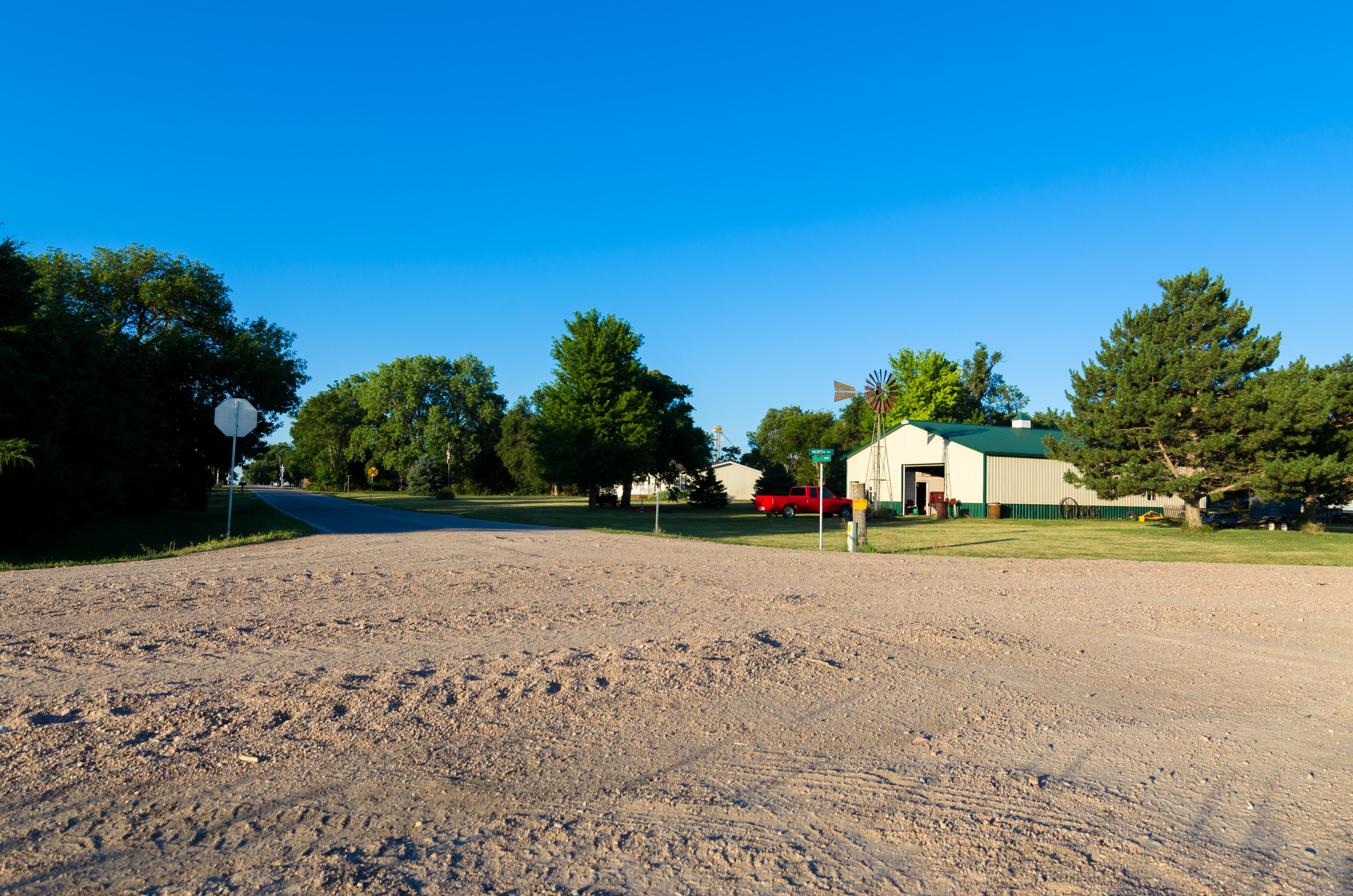
Inland

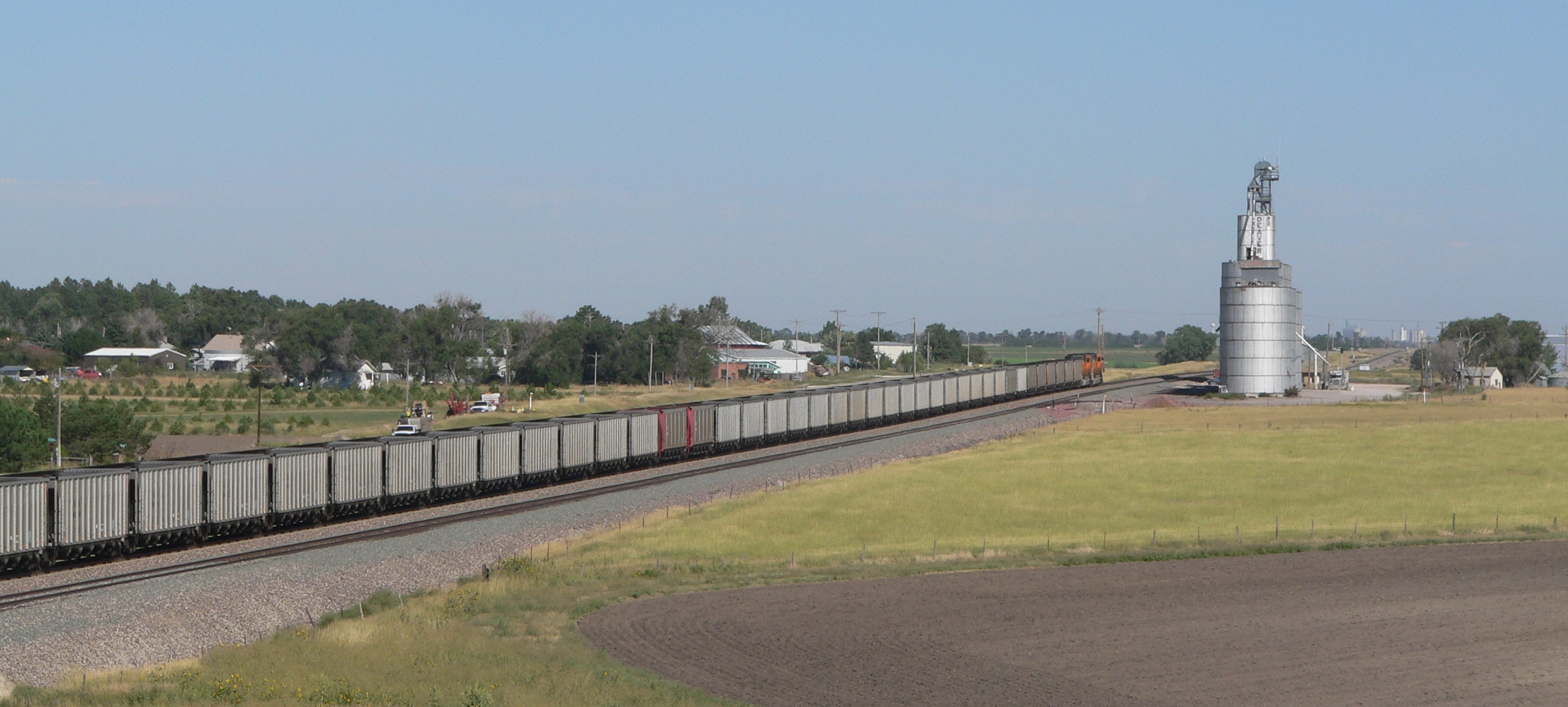
Berea

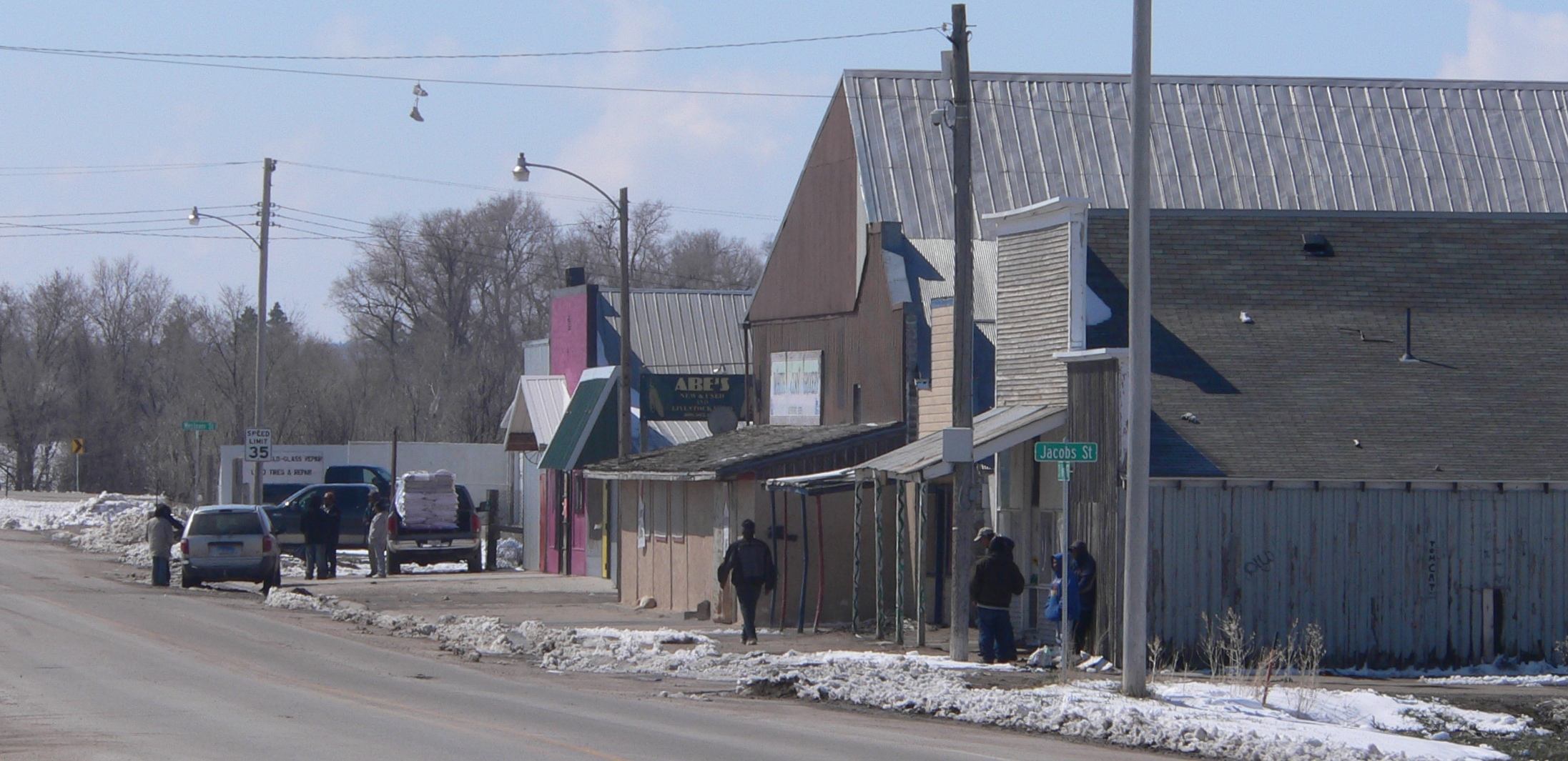
Whiteclay

Name	County	Population (2010)	Land area	
Name	County	Population (2010)	sq mi	km^{2}
Chalco	Sarpy	10,994	2.92	7.6
Offutt AFB	Sarpy	4,644	4.16	10.8
Woodland Park	Stanton	1,866	1.53	4.0
Macy	Thurston	1,023	1.59	4.1
Glenwood	Buffalo	466	2.44	6.3
Lakeview	Platte	317	0.61	1.6
Walton	Lancaster	306	3.56	9.2
Yankee Hill	Lancaster	292	2.87	7.4
King Lake	Douglas	280	0.99	2.6
St. Libory	Howard	264	0.33	0.85
Belmar	Keith	216	4.58	11.9
Woodland Hills	Otoe	215	0.36	0.93
Tryon	McPherson	157	1.19	3.1
Overland	Hamilton	153	1.19	3.1
Odessa	Buffalo	130	1.81	4.7
Inavale	Webster	117	0.33	0.85
Bow Valley	Cedar	116	0.14	0.36
La Platte	Sarpy	114	0.29	0.75
Aten	Cedar	112	1.70	4.4
Champion	Chase	103	0.24	0.62
Harrisburg	Banner	100	6.47	16.8
Martin	Keith	92	0.36	0.93
Wann	Saunders	86	1.49	3.9
Lemoyne	Keith	82	0.51	1.3
Archer	Merrick	81	1.00	2.6
Venice	Douglas	75	0.48	1.2
Sunol	Cheyenne	73	2.19	5.7
Lisco	Garden	64	0.60	1.6
Roscoe	Keith	63	0.16	0.41
Inland	Clay	62	0.17	0.44
Keystone	Keith	59	0.20	0.52
Lorenzo	Cheyenne	58	6.84	17.7
Tamora	Seward	58	0.99	2.6
Max	Dundy	57	0.22	0.57
Fontanelle	Dodge and Washington	54	0.25	0.65
Holmesville	Gage	51	0.22	0.57
Richfield	Sarpy	43	1.51	3.9
Enders	Chase	42	0.13	0.34
Loretto	Boone	42	0.28	0.73
Berea	Box Butte	41	1.19	3.1
Westerville	Custer	39	0.13	0.34
Sarben	Keith	31	0.16	0.41
Willow Island	Dawson	26	2.81	7.3
Ames	Dodge	24	0.33	0.85
Parks	Dundy	23	0.18	0.47
Raeville	Boone	22	0.05	0.13
Poole	Buffalo	19	2.70	7.0
Brownlee	Cherry	15	0.11	0.28
Lindy	Knox	13	1.00	2.6
Whiteclay	Sheridan	10	0.07	0.18

== See also ==
- List of counties in Nebraska
- List of unincorporated communities in Nebraska
