= List of unincorporated communities in Nebraska =

This is a list of unincorporated communities in Nebraska. All communities on this list are census-designated places, are listed on the official Nebraska highway map, have post offices located in the community, or have FIPS place codes.

== A ==
- Agnew
- Akron
- Allenspark
- Almeria
- Amelia
- Ames
- Angora
- Antioch
- Archer
- Ashby
- Assumption
- Aten

== B ==
- Belmar
- Berea
- Bingham
- Boone
- Bow Valley
- Bookwalter
- Brandon
- Brownlee
- Buda

== C ==
- Chalco
- Champion
- Cheney
- Cisco
- Cumminsville

== D ==
- Dickens
- Darr

== E ==
- Eli
- Ellis
- Ellsworth
- Emerald
- Enders

== F ==
- Fontanelle

== G ==
- Gladstone
- Glenwood
- Grainton

== H ==
- Harrisburg
- Holland
- Holmesville
- Howe

== I ==
- Inavale
- Inland

== J ==
- Jalapa
- Joder

== K ==
- Keystone
- King Lake
- Kramer

== L ==
- La Platte
- Lakeside
- Lakeview
- Lemoyne
- Lindy
- Lisco
- Loma
- Lorenzo
- Loretto

== M ==
- Macy
- Marsland
- Martell
- Martin
- Mascot
- Max
- Milburn
- Mills

== N ==
- Nashville
- Norden

== O ==
- Odessa
- Offutt AFB
- Overland

== P ==
- Paul
- Parks
- Poole
- Prairie Home
- Princeton
- Purdum

== R ==
- Raeville
- Rescue
- Richfield
- Rokeby
- Roscoe
- Rose

== S ==
- Saint Mary
- Sarben
- Seneca
- St. James
- St. Libory
- St. Michael
- Sparks
- Sunol
- Shadow Lake
- Sweetwater
- Shestak

== T ==
- Tamora
- Tryon

== V ==
- Venice

== W ==
- Walton
- Wann
- Weissert
- Westerville
- Whiteclay
- Whitman
- Willow Island
- Woodland Hills
- Woodland Park

== Y ==
- Yankee Hill

== See also ==
- List of cities in Nebraska
- List of villages in Nebraska
