= List of census-designated places in Nebraska =

Census-designated places in Nebraska

Map of the United States with Nebraska highlighted

This is a list of census-designated places in Nebraska. The United States Census Bureau defines census-designated places as unincorporated communities lacking elected municipal officers and boundaries with legal status.

As of the 2020 census, Nebraska has 61 census-designated places, up from 50 in the 2010 census. Most CDPs in the state are small rural communities, although the list also includes a few bigger communities and suburbs. A total of 24,617 people live in Nebraska's CDPs, or 1,26% of the population.

== Census-designated places ==
Name	County	Population (2020)	Area (2020)		Coordinates
Name	County	Population (2020)	sq mi	km^{2}	Coordinates
Agnew	Lancaster	30	0.188	0.5	41.014234°N 96.81427°W
Ames	Dodge	14	0.329	0.9	41.448457°N 96.626339°W
Archer	Merrick	68	1.002	2.6	41.166629°N 98.138864°W
Aten	Cedar	134	1.699	4.4	42.836736°N 97.44081°W
Beacon View	Sarpy	55	0.432	1.1	41.071193°N 96.326474°W
Belmar	Keith	199	4.582	11.9	41.305457°N 101.934626°W
Berea	Box Butte	49	1.193	3.1	42.212279°N 102.982984°W
Bow Valley	Cedar	95	0.143	0.4	42.715424°N 97.252206°W
Brownlee	Cherry	13	0.106	0.3	42.289207°N 100.624178°W
Chalco	Sarpy	11,064	2.817	7.3	41.181645°N 96.135367°W
Champion	Chase	115	0.246	0.6	40.470854°N 101.744895°W
Cheney	Lancaster	164	0.141	0.4	40.726041°N 96.593604°W
Emerald	Lancaster	45	0.589	1.5	40.81313°N 96.835371°W
Enders	Chase	37	0.131	0.3	40.454919°N 101.535567°W
Fontanelle	Washington	67	0.252	0.7	41.538255°N 96.427187°W
Glenwood	Buffalo	503	2.401	6.2	40.755459°N 99.081007°W
Harrisburg	Banner	99	6.469	16.8	41.550529°N 103.726684°W
Holmesville	Gage	60	0.225	0.6	40.201426°N 96.65885°W
Inavale	Webster	66	0.334	0.9	40.092266°N 98.648391°W
Inland	Clay	58	0.169	0.4	40.595358°N 98.223235°W
Keystone	Keith	73	0.201	0.5	41.21874°N 101.584122°W
King Lake	Douglas	114	1.111	2.9	41.309669°N 96.302285°W
Kramer	Lancaster	26	0.47	1.2	40.591319°N 96.873283°W
Lakeview	Platte	378	0.61	1.6	41.499721°N 97.377516°W
La Platte	Sarpy	50	0.307	0.8	41.072261°N 95.926508°W
Lemoyne	Keith	44	0.51	1.3	41.276644°N 101.813356°W
Lindy	Knox	13	0.998	2.6	42.735114°N 97.749951°W
Linoma Beach	Sarpy	43	0.716	1.9	41.057297°N 96.314066°W
Lisco	Garden	68	0.595	1.5	41.498669°N 102.623647°W
Lorenzo	Cheyenne	36	6.836	17.7	41.057574°N 103.082098°W
Loretto	Boone	50	0.281	0.7	41.763444°N 98.081721°W
Macy	Thurston	1,045	1.595	4.1	42.115881°N 96.366599°W
Martell	Lancaster	125	0.191	0.5	40.638942°N 96.758794°W
Martin	Keith	76	0.359	0.9	41.258135°N 101.709005°W
Max	Dundy	50	0.221	0.6	40.11432°N 101.404489°W
Melia	Sarpy	98	1.44	3.7	41.097166°N 96.276438°W
Odessa	Buffalo	132	1.824	4.7	40.699108°N 99.25441°W
Offutt Air Force Base	Sarpy	5,363	4.169	10.8	41.120993°N 95.921108°W
Overland	Hamilton	202	1.315	3.4	41.08024°N 97.978905°W
Parks	Dundy	12	0.176	0.5	40.04362°N 101.725113°W
Poole	Buffalo	22	2.751	7.1	40.992269°N 98.960594°W
Prairie Home	Lancaster	38	0.457	1.2	40.862006°N 96.524538°W
Princeton	Lancaster	51	0.29	0.8	40.576029°N 96.70595°W
Raeville	Boone	18	0.05	0.1	41.895582°N 98.053616°W
Richfield	Sarpy	42	1.511	3.9	41.110763°N 96.076324°W
Roscoe	Keith	44	0.157	0.4	41.131613°N 101.585195°W
St. Libory	Howard	241	0.332	0.9	41.08214°N 98.359077°W
Sarben	Keith	31	0.157	0.4	41.166277°N 101.304402°W
Seneca	Thomas	49	0.295	0.8	42.043949°N 100.832055°W
Sunol	Cheyenne	57	2.189	5.7	41.154105°N 102.762746°W
Tamora	Seward	44	0.995	2.6	40.894442°N 97.22952°W
Tryon	McPherson	107	1.19	3.1	41.558444°N 100.953594°W
Venice	Douglas	75	0.6	1.6	41.239266°N 96.351907°W
Walton	Lancaster	351	3.562	9.2	40.795958°N 96.565763°W
Wann	Saunders	102	1.49	3.9	41.141891°N 96.364161°W
Westerville	Custer	31	0.131	0.3	41.396196°N 99.381796°W
Whiteclay (Note: Listed as "White Clay" by the United States Census Bureau.)	Sheridan	8	0.071	0.2	42.997019°N 102.555017°W
Willow Island	Dawson	25	2.814	7.3	40.890044°N 100.070711°W
Woodland Hills	Otoe	232	0.366	0.9	40.751637°N 96.423603°W
Woodland Park	Stanton	1,830	1.564	4.1	42.05424°N 97.345189°W
Yankee Hill	Lancaster	286	4.039	10.5	40.765291°N 96.732217°W

== See also ==
- List of counties in Nebraska
- List of cities in Nebraska
- List of townships in Nebraska
- List of villages in Nebraska
