= Belmar =

Belmar may refer to:

- Belmar, Nebraska, an unincorporated community
- Belmar, New Jersey, a borough in Monmouth County, New Jersey, United States
- Belmar, Louisville, a neighborhood in Louisville, Kentucky
- Belmar (horse) (foaled 1892), an American thoroughbred racehorse
- Belmar (Lakewood) - a neighborhood in Lakewood, Colorado
- Lincoln–Lemington–Belmar, a neighborhood in Pittsburgh, Pennsylvania, United States
- Belmar Inc., a jewelry company in Rhode Island founded by Robert Pesare.

== People with the surname ==
- Nazario Belmar (1919–1980), Spanish footballer, producer and lawyer
- Richard Belmar (born 1979), British man who was held in extrajudicial detention in the United States's Guantanamo Bay detention camps
