= Melia, Nebraska =

Unincorporated community in Nebraska, United States

Melia
- Census-designated place
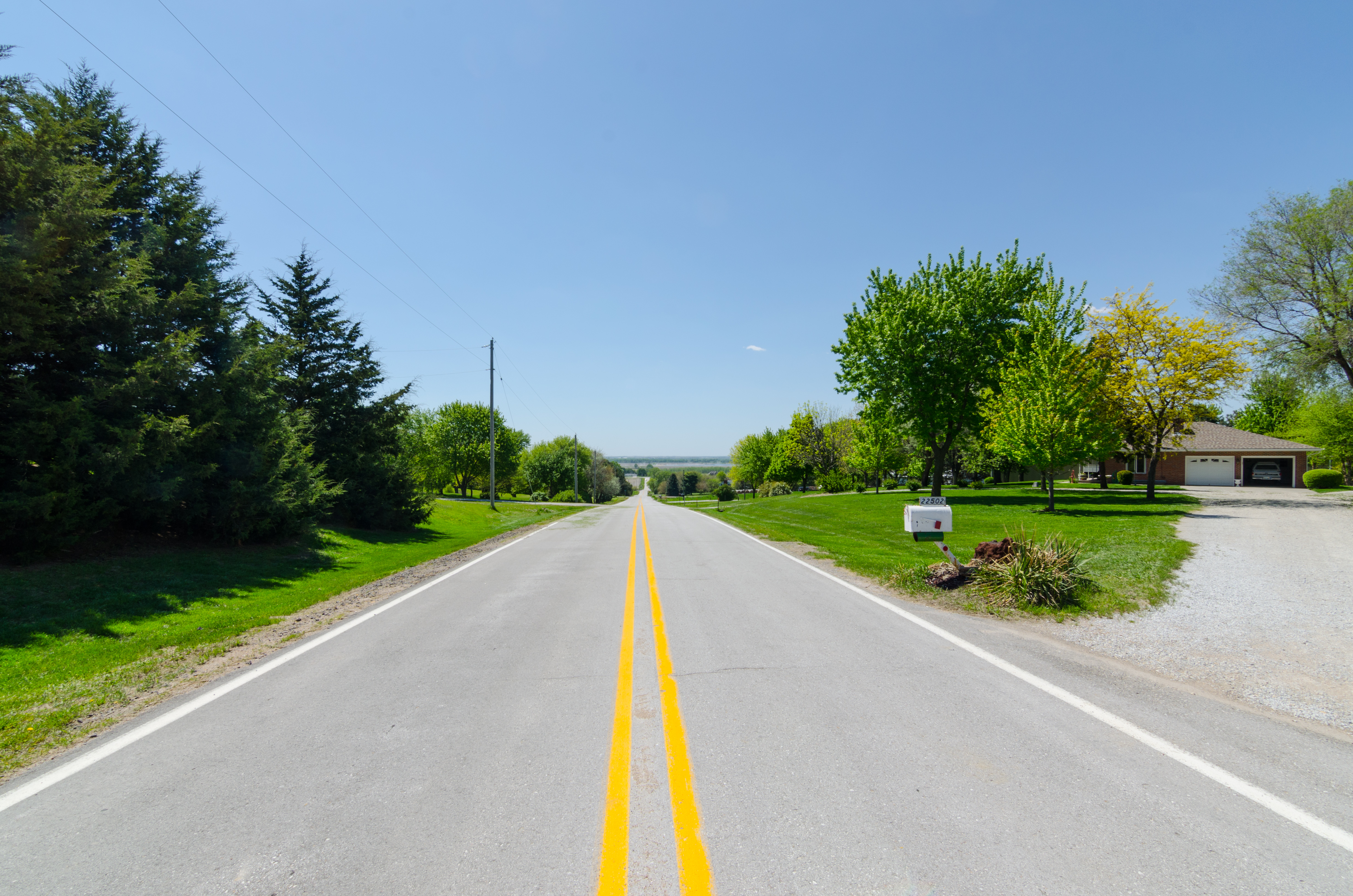
- West on Melia Road overlooking the Platte River, May 2017

- Location within the state of Nebraska Location within the United States
- Country: United States
- State: Nebraska
- County: Sarpy

Area
  - Total: 1.44 sq mi (3.73 km^{2})
  - Land: 1.44 sq mi (3.73 km^{2})
  - Water: 0 sq mi (0.00 km^{2})
- Elevation: 1,132 ft (345 m)

Population (2020)
  - Total: 98
  - Density: 68.0/sq mi (26.27/km^{2})
- Time zone: UTC-6 (Central (CST))
  - Summer (DST): UTC-5 (CDT)
- ZIP codes: 68028
- FIPS code: 31-31605
- GNIS feature ID: 835379

Melia is a census-designated place (CDP) in Sarpy County, Nebraska, United States. As of the 2020 census, Melia had a population of 98.

Melia was named in honor of an early settler, John J. Melia. It was a station on the Chicago, Burlington, and Quincy Railroad.

== Demographics ==
Historical population
Census	Pop.	Note	%±
2020	98		—
U.S. Decennial Census

== See also ==
- List of census-designated places in Nebraska
