= Inavale, Nebraska =

Census-designated place in Webster County, Nebraska, United States

- census-designated place
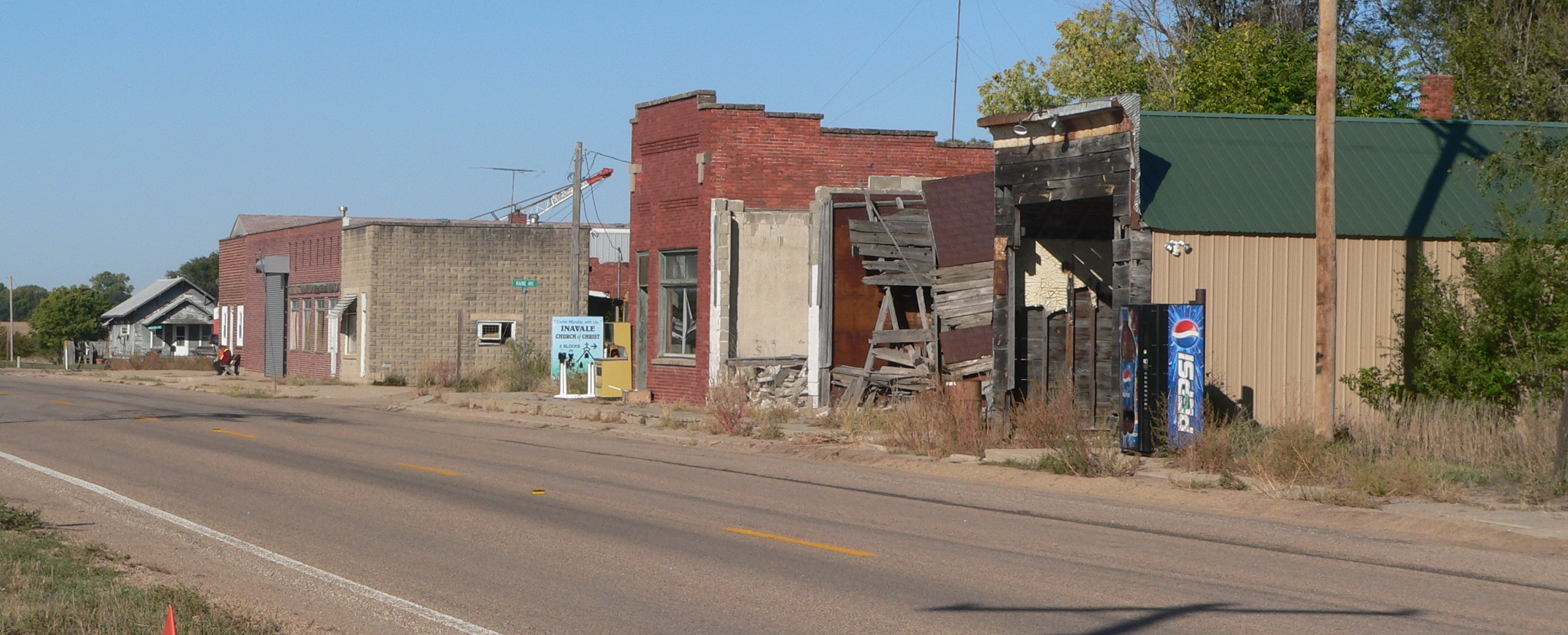
- Blaine Street (U.S. Route 136) in Inavale, October 2013

- Location within the state of Nebraska
- Coordinates: 40°05′32″N 98°38′54″W
- Country: United States
- State: Nebraska
- County: Webster

Area
  - Total: 0.33 sq mi (0.86 km^{2})
  - Land: 0.33 sq mi (0.86 km^{2})
  - Water: 0 sq mi (0.00 km^{2})
- Elevation: 1,739 ft (530 m)

Population (2020)
  - Total: 66
  - Density: 197.7/sq mi (76.32/km^{2})
- Time zone: UTC-6 (Central (CST))
  - Summer (DST): UTC-5 (CDT)
- ZIP codes: 68952
- FIPS code: 31-23725
- GNIS feature ID: 2583882

Inavale is a census-designated place in western Webster County, Nebraska, United States. As of the 2020 census, Inavale had a population of 66.

== Description ==
The community lies along U.S. Route 136, west of the city of Red Cloud, the county seat of Webster County. Its elevation is 1,736 feet (529 m).

A post office was established at Invale in 1873, and remained in operation until it was discontinued in 1994. Inavale retains the ZIP code of 68952. The town's name is descriptive, from its setting in a vale.

== Demographics ==
Historical population
Census	Pop.	Note	%±
2020	66		—
U.S. Decennial Census

== See also ==
- List of census-designated places in Nebraska
