= Richfield, Nebraska =

Census-designated place in Sarpy County, Nebraska, United States

- Census-designated place
- Interactive map of Richfield, Nebraska
- Coordinates: 41°06′39″N 96°04′35″W
- Country: United States
- State: Nebraska
- County: Sarpy
- Elevation: 1,243 ft (379 m)
- FIPS code: 31-41340
- GNIS feature ID: 2583895

Richfield is a census-designated place (CDP) in Sarpy County, Nebraska, United States. As of the 2020 census, Richfield had a population of 42.

== History ==
A post office was established at Richfield in 1890, and remained in operation until being discontinued in 1998. Richfield was named for the fertility of the surrounding farmland.

== Geography ==
According to the United States Census Bureau, the CDP has a total area of 3.91 square kilometres (1.51 sq mi), all land.

== Demographics ==
As of the census of 2010, there were 43 people living in the CDP. The population density was 10.99 inhabitants/ km^{2}. Of the 43 inhabitants, Richfield was composed of 95.35% white, 0% were African-American, 0% were Native American, 0% were Asian, 0% were Pacific Islanders, 0% were from other races and 4.65% belonged to two or more races. Of the total population, 0% were Hispanic or Latino of any race.

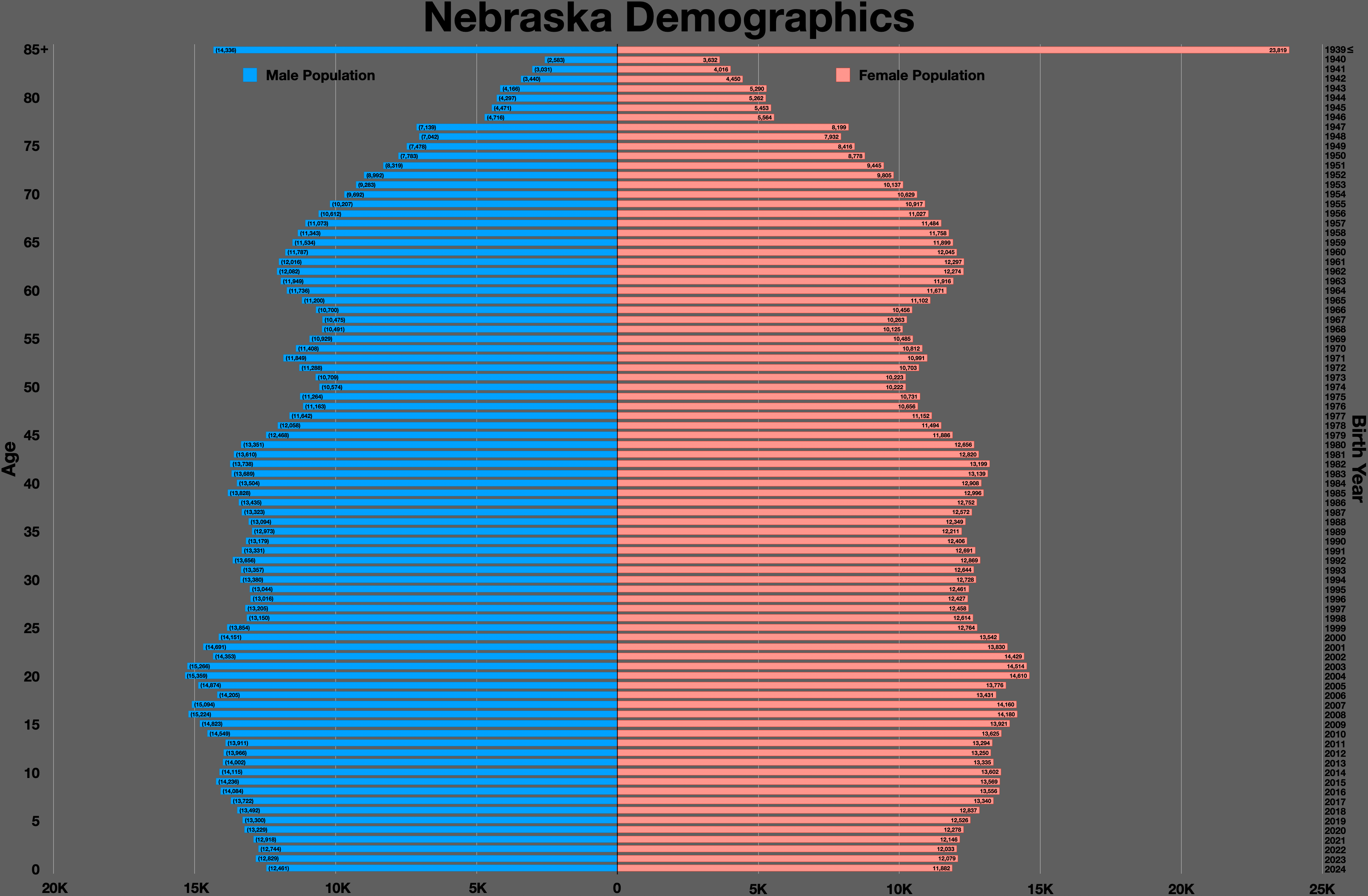
Age-Gender-Race-Origin Analysis & Population Pyramids

== See also ==
- List of census-designated places in Nebraska
