= Lakeview, Nebraska =

Census-designated place in Platte County, Nebraska, United States

- Census-designated place
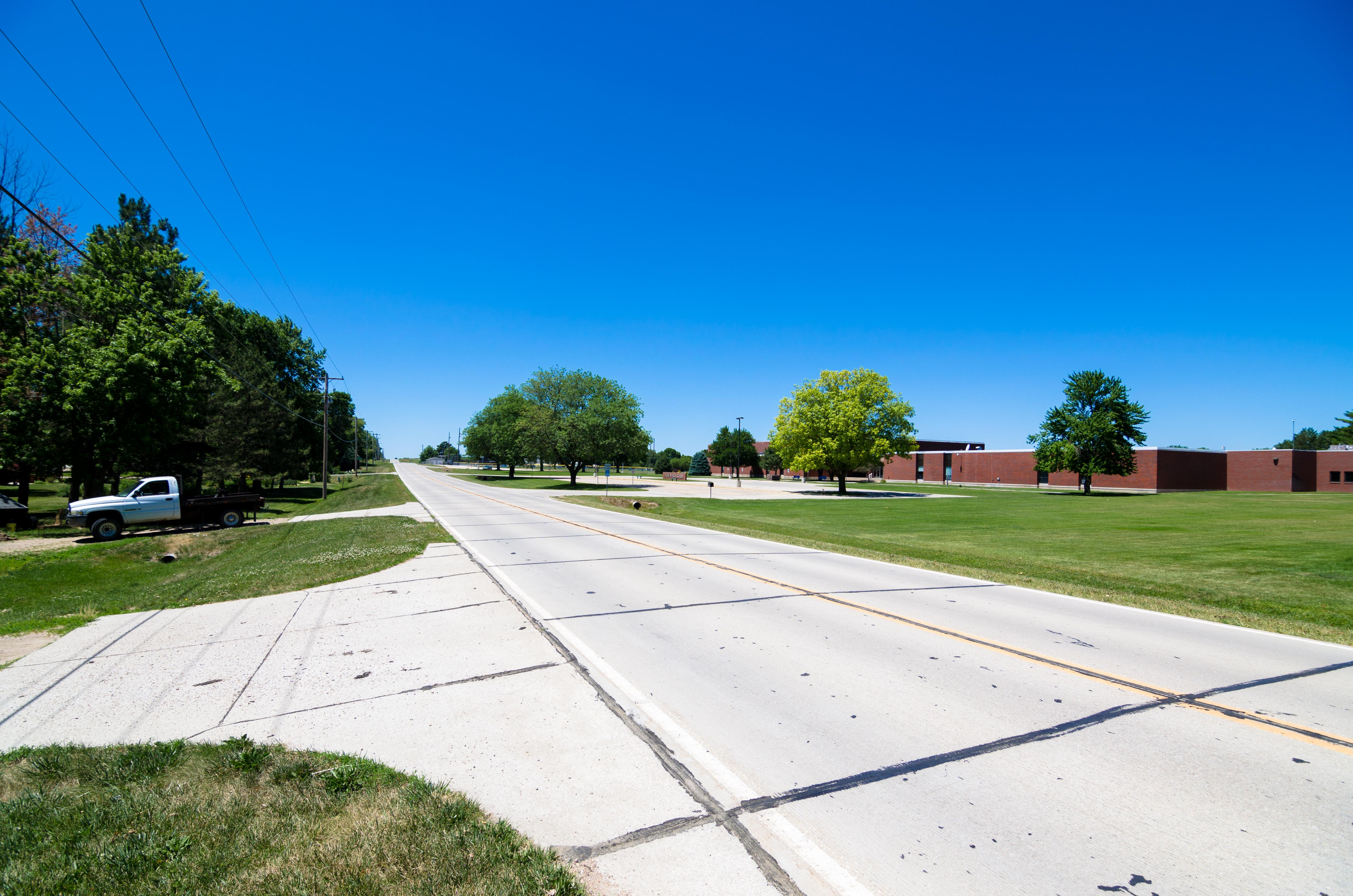
- Lakeview High School, June 2017

- Location within Nebraska Location within the United States
- Coordinates: 41°29′59″N 97°22′39″W
- Country: United States
- State: Nebraska
- County: Platte

Area
  - Total: 0.61 sq mi (1.58 km^{2})
  - Land: 0.61 sq mi (1.58 km^{2})
  - Water: 0 sq mi (0.00 km^{2})
- Elevation: 1,526 ft (465 m)

Population (2020)
  - Total: 378
  - Density: 620.1/sq mi (239.43/km^{2})
- Time zone: UTC-6 (Central (CST))
  - Summer (DST): UTC-5 (CDT)
- ZIP code: 68601
- Area codes: 402 & 531
- GNIS feature ID: 2587008

Lakeview is a census-designated place (CDP) in Platte County, Nebraska, United States. As of the 2020 census, Lakeview had a population of 378.

== Geography ==
According to the U.S. Census Bureau, the community has an area of 0.610 square miles (1.58 km^{2}), all land.

== Demographics ==
Historical population
Census	Pop.	Note	%±
2020	378		—
U.S. Decennial Census

== See also ==
- List of census-designated places in Nebraska
