= Inland, Nebraska =

Census-designated place in Clay County, Nebraska, United States

- Census-designated place
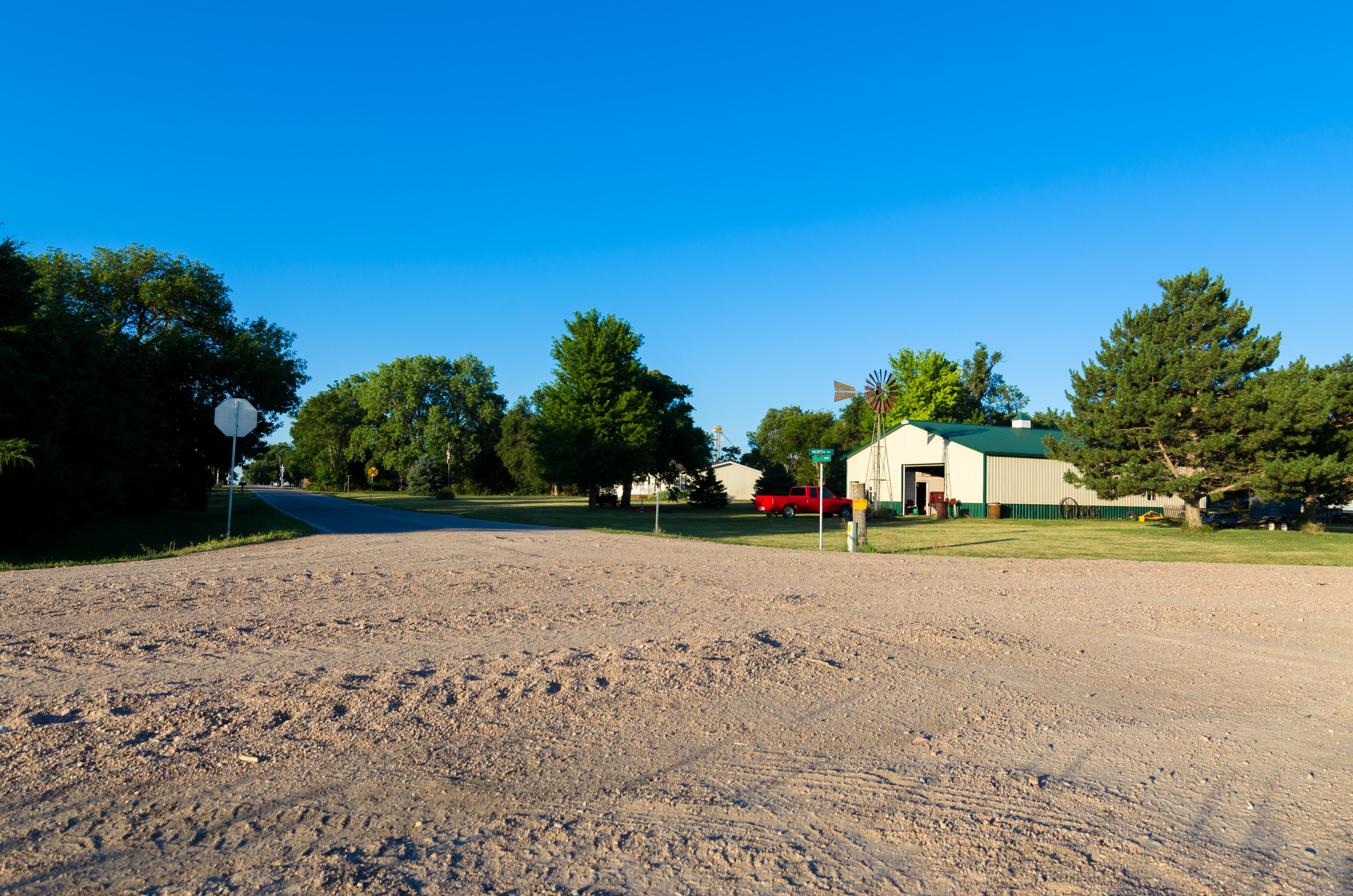
- Inland, July 2017

- Location within the state of Nebraska
- Coordinates: 40°35′43″N 98°13′23″W
- Country: United States
- State: Nebraska
- County: Clay

Area
  - Total: 0.16 sq mi (0.42 km^{2})
  - Land: 0.16 sq mi (0.42 km^{2})
  - Water: 0 sq mi (0.00 km^{2})
- Elevation: 1,857 ft (566 m)

Population (2020)
  - Total: 58
  - Density: 355.3/sq mi (137.17/km^{2})
- Time zone: UTC-6 (Central (CST))
  - Summer (DST): UTC-5 (CDT)
- ZIP codes: 68954
- FIPS code: 31-24055
- GNIS feature ID: 2583883

Inland is a census-designated place in northwestern Clay County, Nebraska, United States. As of the 2020 census, Inland had a population of 58. Although Inland is unincorporated, it has a post office, with the ZIP code of 68954.

== History ==
Inland was founded circa 1878. The name is descriptive. A post office was established at Inland in 1879.

== Geography ==
Inland lies along local roads just north of U.S. Route 6, 14 miles (23 km) northwest of the city of Clay Center, the county seat of Clay County. Hastings is 10 miles (16 km) to the west. Inland's elevation is 1,854 feet (565 m) above sea level.

== Demographics ==
Historical population
Census	Pop.	Note	%±
2020	58		—
U.S. Decennial Census

== See also ==
- List of census-designated places in Nebraska
