= La Platte, Nebraska =

Census-designated placed in Sarpy County, Nebraska, United States

- Census-designated place
- Interactive map of La Platte, Nebraska
- Coordinates: 41°04′19″N 95°55′32″W
- Country: United States
- State: Nebraska
- County: Sarpy

Area
  - Total: 0.31 sq mi (0.80 km^{2})
  - Land: 0.28 sq mi (0.73 km^{2})
  - Water: 0.023 sq mi (0.06 km^{2})
- Elevation: 981 ft (299 m)

Population (2020)
  - Total: 50
  - Density: 177.1/sq mi (68.37/km^{2})
- ZIP code: 68123
- Area codes: 402 and 531
- FIPS code: 31-26315
- GNIS feature ID: 2583886

La Platte is a census-designated place (CDP) in Sarpy County, Nebraska, United States. As of the 2020 census, La Platte had a population of 50.

== History ==
La Platte was laid out in 1870. It was named from the Platte River.

A post office was established at La Platte in 1871, and remained in operation until it was discontinued in 1955.

== Geography ==
According to the United States Census Bureau, the CDP has a total area of 0.8 square kilometres (0.31 sq mi), of which 0.75 square kilometres (0.29 sq mi) is land and 0.05 square kilometres (0.019 sq mi) is water.

== Demographics ==
Historical population
Census	Pop.	Note	%±
2020	50		—
U.S. Decennial Census

As of the census of 2010, there were 114 people living in the CDP. The population density was 142.91 inhabitants/ km^{2}. Of the 114 inhabitants, La Platte was composed of 91.23% white, 0% were African-American, 4.39% were Native American, 0% were Asian, 0% were Pacific Islanders, 3.51% were from other races and the 0.88% belonged to two or more races. Of the total population 6.14% were Hispanic or Latino of any race.

== See also ==
- List of census-designated places in Nebraska
