= Sarben, Nebraska =

- Census-designated place
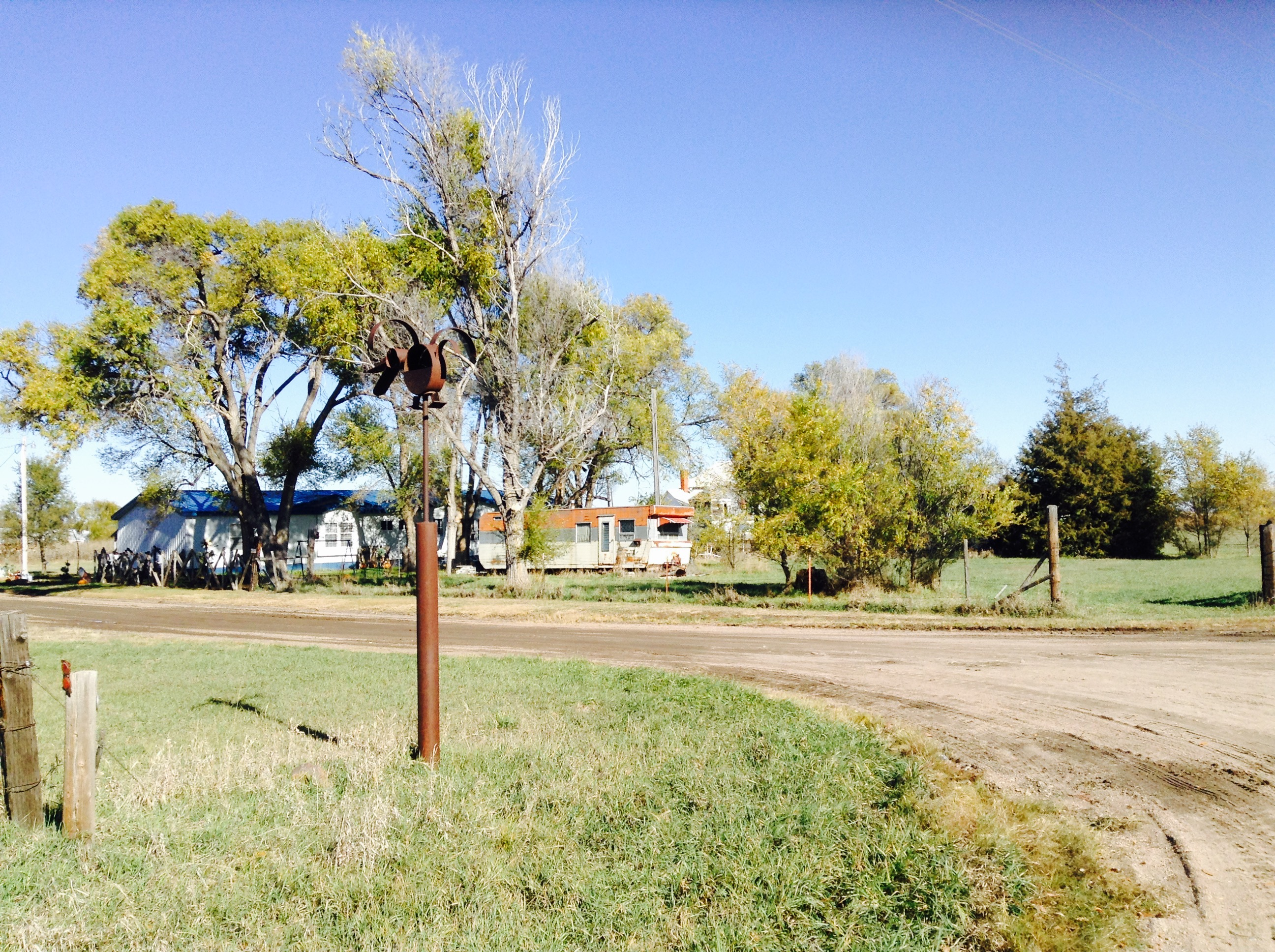
- "A Street" in Sarben

- Location within Nebraska Location within the United States
- Coordinates: 41°09′59″N 101°18′16″W
- Country: United States
- State: Nebraska
- County: Keith

Area
  - Total: 0.16 sq mi (0.41 km^{2})
  - Land: 0.16 sq mi (0.41 km^{2})
  - Water: 0 sq mi (0.00 km^{2})
- Elevation: 3,005 ft (916 m)

Population (2020)
  - Total: 31
  - Density: 197.7/sq mi (76.34/km^{2})
- Time zone: UTC-7 (Central (CST))
  - Summer (DST): UTC-6 (CDT)
- ZIP Code: 69155
- Area code: 308
- FIPS code: 31-43560
- GNIS feature ID: 2583898

Sarben is an unincorporated community and census-designated place in Keith County, Nebraska, United States. As of the 2020 census, Sarben had a population of 31.

== History ==
Sarben had its start by the building of the Union Pacific Railroad through that territory. Sarben took its name from "Aksarben", or "Nebraska" spelled backwards.

== Geography ==
Sarben is in eastern Keith County, in the valley of the North Platte River. It is 5 miles (8 km) via local roads northeast of Paxton and 10 miles (16 km) west of Sutherland. It is 25 miles (40 km) northeast of Ogallala, the Keith county seat.

According to the U.S. Census Bureau, the Sarben CDP has an area of 0.16 square miles (0.41 km^{2}), all land.

== Demographics ==
Historical population
Census	Pop.	Note	%±
2020	31		—
U.S. Decennial Census

== See also ==
- List of geographic names derived from anagrams and ananyms
