= Venice, Nebraska =

- census-designated place
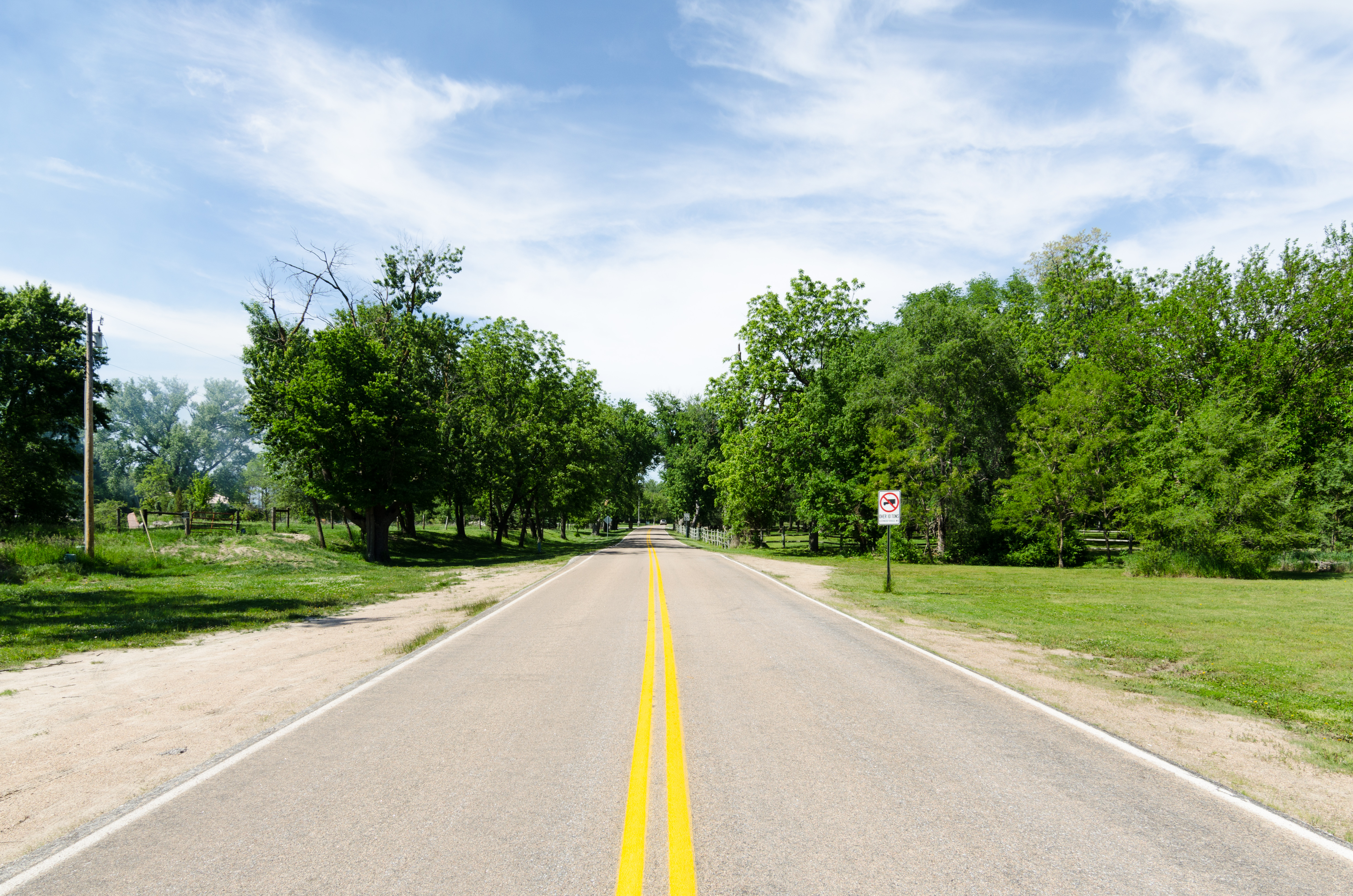
- North on Campanile Road

- Location within Nebraska
- Coordinates: 41°14′02″N 96°21′13″W
- Country: United States
- State: Nebraska
- County: Douglas

Area
  - Total: 0.60 sq mi (1.55 km^{2})
  - Land: 0.47 sq mi (1.22 km^{2})
  - Water: 0.13 sq mi (0.33 km^{2})
- Elevation: 1,119 ft (341 m)

Population (2020)
  - Total: 75
  - Density: 158.7/sq mi (61.27/km^{2})
- ZIP code: 68069
- Area codes: 402 and 531
- FIPS code: 31-50265
- GNIS feature ID: 2583902

Venice is a census-designated place (CDP) in Douglas County, Nebraska, United States. The population was 75 at the 2020 Census. 40 people are male and 35 are female. The area is 0.60 sq. miles. The population density is 125.09 people/sq. mi. The land area is 0.48 sq. miles. The water area is 0.12 sq. miles.

== Demographics ==
Historical population
Census	Pop.	Note	%±
2010	75		—
2020	75		0.0%
U.S. Decennial Census

=== Racial and ethnic composition ===
Venice CDP, Nebraska – Racial and ethnic composition Note: the US Census treats Hispanic/Latino as an ethnic category. This table excludes Latinos from the racial categories and assigns them to a separate category. Hispanics/Latinos may be of any race.
Race / Ethnicity (NH = Non-Hispanic)	Pop 2010	Pop 2020	% 2010	% 2020
White alone (NH)	73	73	97.33%	97.33%
Black or African American alone (NH)	0	0	0.00%	0.00%
Native American or Alaska Native alone (NH)	0	0	0.00%	0.00%
Asian alone (NH)	0	0	0.00%	0.00%
Native Hawaiian or Pacific Islander alone (NH)	0	0	0.00%	0.00%
Other race alone (NH)	0	0	0.00%	0.00%
Mixed race or Multiracial (NH)	2	1	2.67%	1.33%
Hispanic or Latino (any race)	0	1	0.00%	1.33%
Total	75	75	100.00%	100.00%
