= Overland, Nebraska =

- Census-designated place
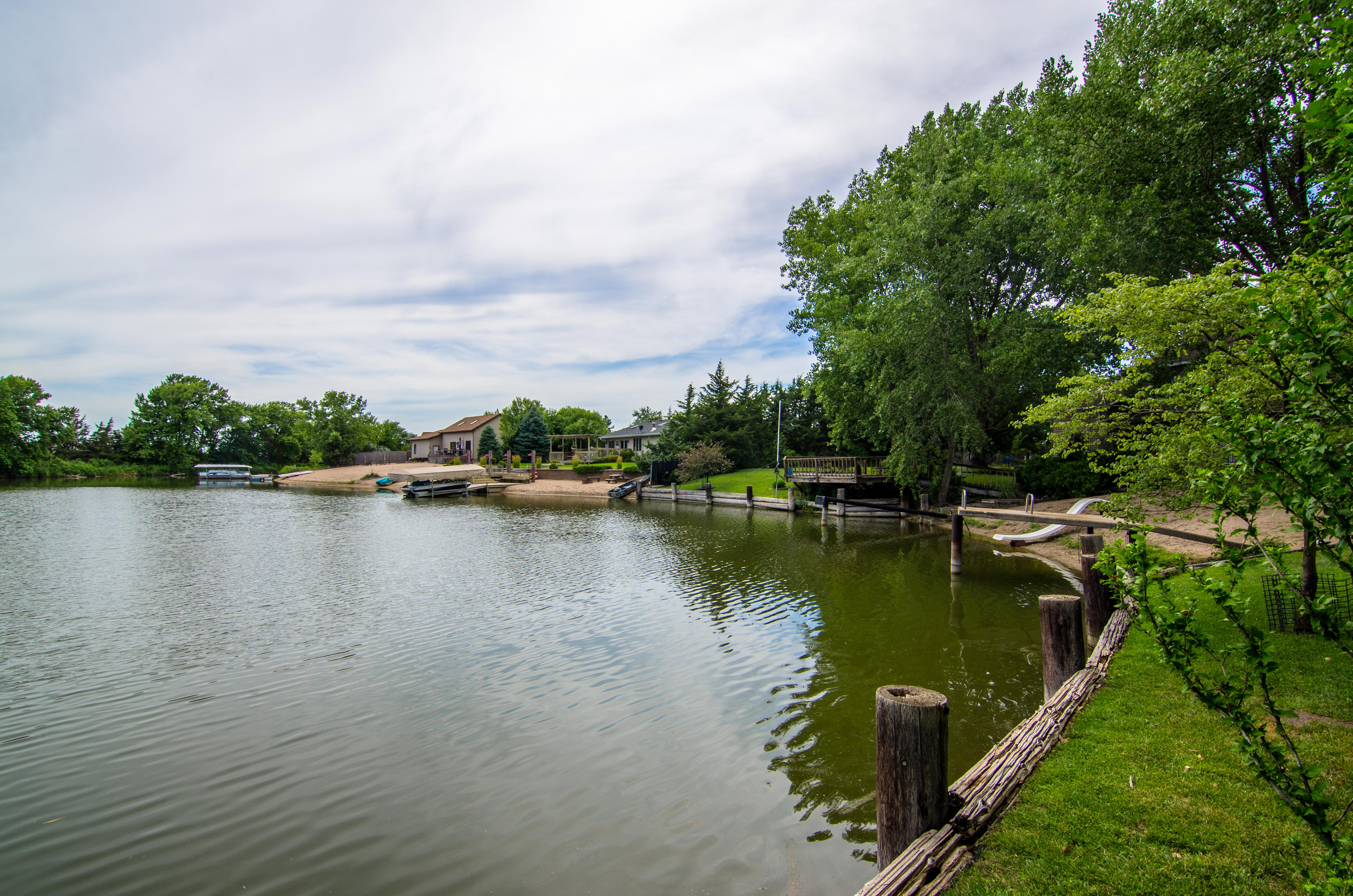
- The Platte River

- Location within the state of Nebraska
- Coordinates: 41°04′51″N 97°58′42″W
- Country: United States
- State: Nebraska
- County: Hamilton

Area
  - Total: 1.32 sq mi (3.41 km^{2})
  - Land: 0.90 sq mi (2.32 km^{2})
  - Water: 0.42 sq mi (1.09 km^{2})
- Elevation: 1,703 ft (519 m)

Population (2020)
  - Total: 202
  - Density: 225.8/sq mi (87.19/km^{2})
- Time zone: UTC-6 (Central (CST))
  - Summer (DST): UTC-5 (CDT)
- Area code: 402
- FIPS code: 31-37735
- GNIS feature ID: 2583892

Overland is a census-designated place (CDP) in Hamilton County, Nebraska, United States. As of the 2020 census, Overland had a population of 202.

== Geography ==
Overland has a total area of 1.4 square miles (3.7 km^{2}), of which 1.2 square miles (3.1 km^{2}) is land and 0.23 square miles (0.6 km^{2}), or 16.23%, is water. The community is located along the south side of the Platte River, along Nebraska Highway 66 and east of Nebraska Highway 14, 3 miles (5 km) south of Central City.

== Demographics ==
Historical population
Census	Pop.	Note	%±
2020	202		—
U.S. Decennial Census
