= Wann, Nebraska =

- Census-Designated Place
- Interactive map of Wann, Nebraska
- Coordinates: 41°08′48″N 96°21′21″W
- Country: United States
- State: Nebraska
- County: Saunders

Area
  - Total: 1.50 sq mi (3.89 km^{2})
  - Land: 1.49 sq mi (3.86 km^{2})
  - Water: 0.012 sq mi (0.03 km^{2})
- Elevation: 1,083 ft (330 m)

Population (2020)
  - Total: 102
  - Density: 68.5/sq mi (26.44/km^{2})
- ZIP code: 68003
- Area codes: 402 and 531
- FIPS code: 31-51350
- GNIS feature ID: 2583904

Wann is an unincorporated community and census-designated place (CDP) in Saunders County, Nebraska, United States. As of the 2020 census, Wann had a population of 102.

== History ==
A post office was established at Wann in 1908, and remained in operation until it was discontinued in 1950.

== Demographics ==
Historical population
Census	Pop.	Note	%±
2020	102		—
U.S. Decennial Census
