= Willow Island, Nebraska =

- Census-designated place
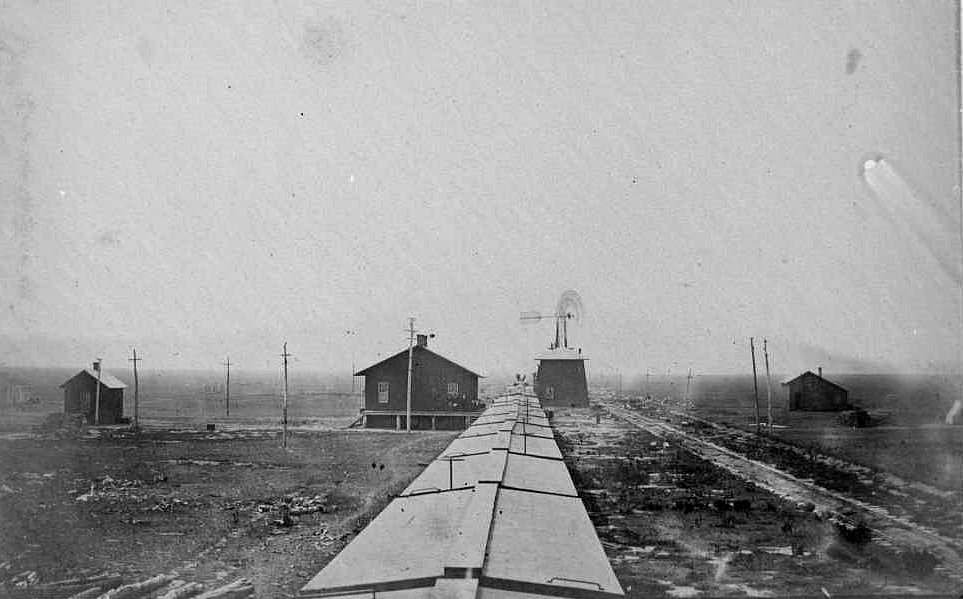
- Union Pacific Railroad station in Willow Island, 1867

- Location within the state of Nebraska
- Coordinates: 40°53′24″N 100°04′15″W
- Country: United States
- State: Nebraska
- County: Dawson

Area
  - Total: 2.81 sq mi (7.29 km^{2})
  - Land: 2.81 sq mi (7.29 km^{2})
  - Water: 0 sq mi (0.00 km^{2})
- Elevation: 2,523 ft (769 m)

Population (2020)
  - Total: 25
  - Density: 8.9/sq mi (3.43/km^{2})
- Time zone: UTC-6 (Central (CST))
  - Summer (DST): UTC-5 (CDT)
- ZIP code: 69171
- FIPS code: 31-53205
- GNIS feature ID: 2583906

Willow Island (also Willow) is an unincorporated community and census-designated place in western Dawson County, Nebraska, United States. As of the 2020 census, Willow Island had a population of 25.

Willow Island lies near Interstate 80 along U.S. Route 30, between the cities of Cozad and Gothenburg. The city of Lexington, the county seat of Dawson County, lies 19 miles (31 km) southeast of Willow Island. Its elevation is 2,526 feet (770 m).

== History ==
Willow Island was laid out in the 1880s. It was named after a nearby island where willows were abundant. Because the community had two different names (Willow and Willow Island), the Board on Geographic Names ruled in 1902 that the community's official name was "Willow Island." A post office was established at Willow Island in 1874, and remained in operation until it was discontinued in 1991.

== Demographics ==
Historical population
Census	Pop.	Note	%±
2020	25		—
U.S. Decennial Census

== Education ==
It is divided between the following school districts: Gothenburg Public Schools and Cozad Community Schools.
