= Lorenzo, Nebraska =

Census-designated place in Cheyenne County, Nebraska, United States

- Census-designated place
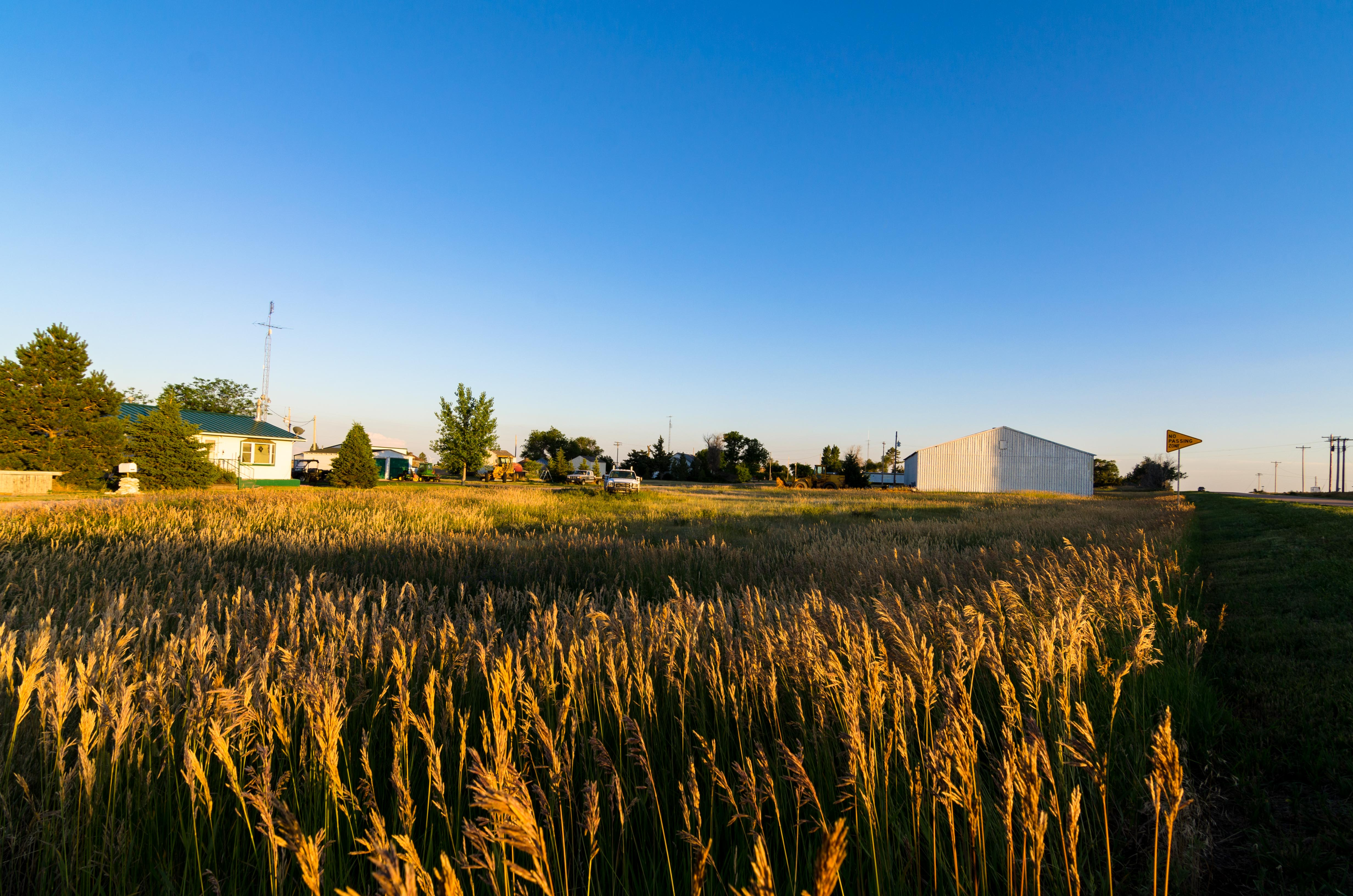
- Lorenzo, July 2017

- Location within the state of Nebraska Location of Lorenzo within the United States
- Coordinates: 41°03′27″N 103°04′56″W
- Country: United States
- State: Nebraska
- County: Cheyenne

Area
  - Total: 6.84 sq mi (17.71 km^{2})
  - Land: 6.84 sq mi (17.71 km^{2})
  - Water: 0 sq mi (0.00 km^{2})
- Elevation: 4,380 ft (1,340 m)

Population (2020)
  - Total: 36
  - Density: 5.3/sq mi (2.03/km^{2})
- Time zone: UTC-7 (Mountain (MST))
  - Summer (DST): UTC-6 (MDT)
- ZIP code: 69162
- FIPS code: 31-29120
- GNIS feature ID: 2583889

Lorenzo is a census-designated place in Cheyenne County, Nebraska, United States. As of the 2020 census, Lorenzo had a population of 36. Lorenzo is located on Nebraska Highway 19, 10 miles (16 km) southwest of Sidney, the county seat, and 3.5 miles (5.6 km) north of the Colorado border.

== Demographics ==
Historical population
Census	Pop.	Note	%±
2020	36		—
U.S. Decennial Census

== History ==
Lorenzo was a depot on the Chicago, Burlington and Quincy Railroad. A post office was established at Lorenzo in 1916, and remained in operation until it was discontinued in 1933.
