= King Lake, Nebraska =

- Census-designated place
- Location within Nebraska
- Coordinates: 41°18′49″N 96°18′06″W
- Country: United States
- State: Nebraska
- County: Douglas

Area
  - Total: 1.01 sq mi (2.62 km^{2})
  - Land: 0.98 sq mi (2.54 km^{2})
  - Water: 0.031 sq mi (0.08 km^{2})
- Elevation: 1,125 ft (343 m)

Population (2020)
  - Total: 114
  - Density: 116.2/sq mi (44.87/km^{2})
- ZIP code: 68064
- Area codes: 402 and 531
- FIPS code: 31-25510
- GNIS feature ID: 2583885

King Lake is an unincorporated community and census-designated place (CDP) in Douglas County, Nebraska, United States. As of the 2020 census, King Lake had a population of 114. The area is 1.02 square miles (2.6 km^{2}). The land area is 0.99 square miles (2.6 km^{2}). The water area is 0.03 square miles (0.078 km^{2}).

== Demographics ==
Historical population
Census	Pop.	Note	%±
2010	280		—
2020	114		−59.3%
U.S. Decennial Census

=== Racial and ethnic composition ===
King Lake CDP, Nebraska – Racial and ethnic composition Note: the US Census treats Hispanic/Latino as an ethnic category. This table excludes Latinos from the racial categories and assigns them to a separate category. Hispanics/Latinos may be of any race.
Race / Ethnicity (NH = Non-Hispanic)	Pop 2010	Pop 2020	% 2010	% 2020
White alone (NH)	246	89	87.86%	78.07%
Black or African American alone (NH)	0	0	0.00%	0.00%
Native American or Alaska Native alone (NH)	3	0	1.07%	0.00%
Asian alone (NH)	0	1	0.00%	0.88%
Native Hawaiian or Pacific Islander alone (NH)	0	0	0.00%	0.00%
Other race alone (NH)	0	0	0.00%	0.00%
Mixed race or Multiracial (NH)	9	16	3.21%	14.04%
Hispanic or Latino (any race)	22	8	7.86%	7.02%
Total	280	114	100.00%	100.00%
