= Poole, Nebraska =

- Census-designated place
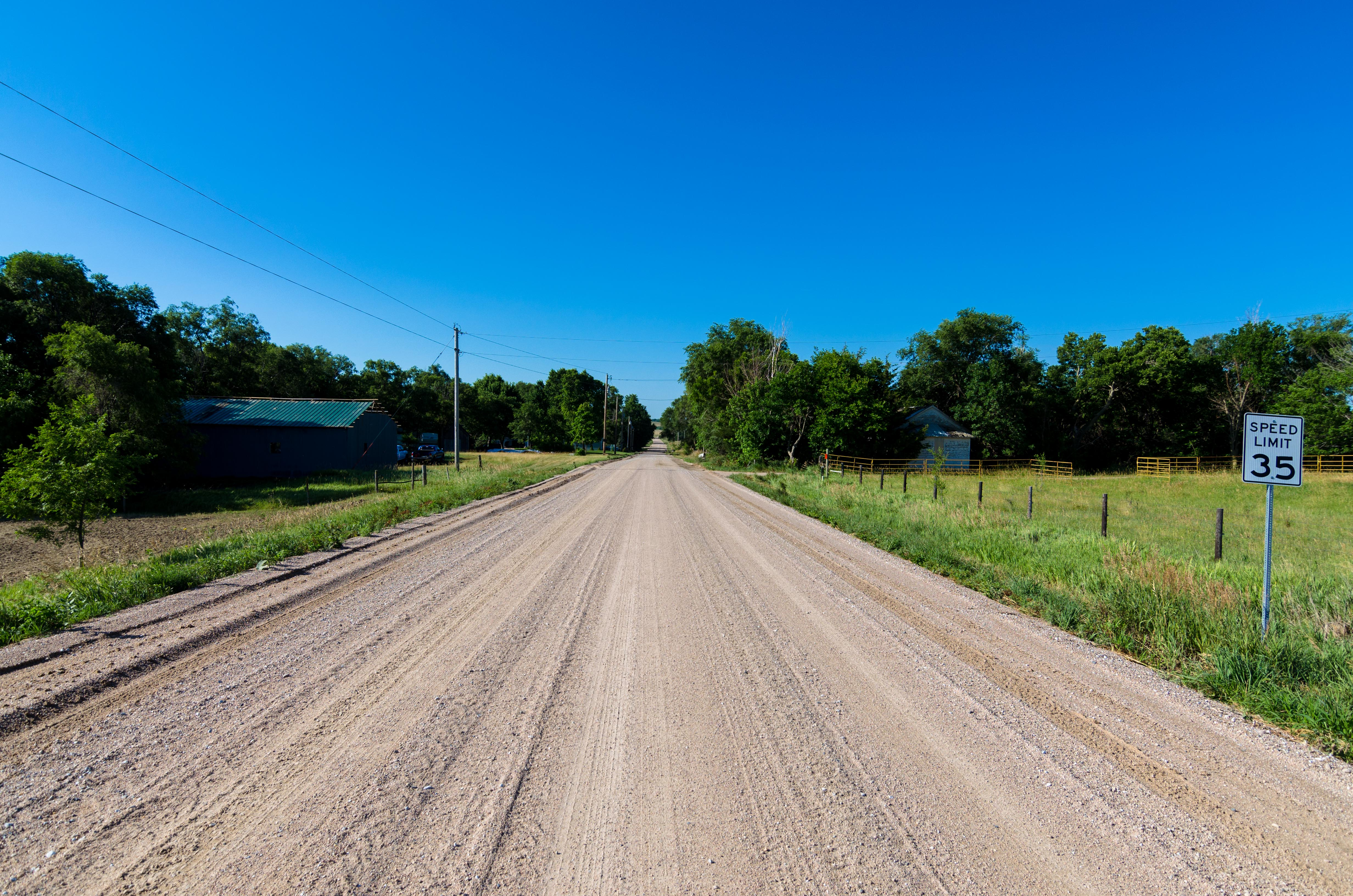
- Poole Road in Poole

- Location within Nebraska Location within the United States
- Coordinates: 40°59′13″N 98°57′56″W
- Country: United States
- State: Nebraska
- County: Buffalo

Area
  - Total: 2.75 sq mi (7.12 km^{2})
  - Land: 2.70 sq mi (7.00 km^{2})
  - Water: 0.050 sq mi (0.13 km^{2})
- Elevation: 2,070 ft (630 m)

Population (2020)
  - Total: 22
  - Density: 8.1/sq mi (3.14/km^{2})
- Time zone: UTC-6 (Central (CST))
  - Summer (DST): UTC-5 (CDT)
- ZIP code: 68869
- Area code: 308
- FIPS code: 31-39835
- GNIS feature ID: 2583894

Poole is a census-designated place (CDP) in Buffalo County, Nebraska, United States. It is part of the Kearney, Nebraska Micropolitan Statistical Area. As of the 2020 census, Poole had a population of 22.

== History ==
Poole was founded circa 1889. It was named for rancher W. W. Poole. A post office was established at Poole in 1906, and remained in operation until it was discontinued in 1982.

== Geography ==
Poole is located in northern Buffalo County on the north side of the South Loup River. The nearest incorporated community is Ravenna, 6 miles (10 km) to the northeast.

According to the United States Census Bureau, the Poole CDP has a total area of 2.7 square miles (7.1 km^{2}), of which 0.04 square miles (0.1 km^{2}), or 1.80%, is water.

== Demographics ==
Historical population
Census	Pop.	Note	%±
2020	22		—
U.S. Decennial Census
