= Woodland Park, Nebraska =

- Unincorporated community
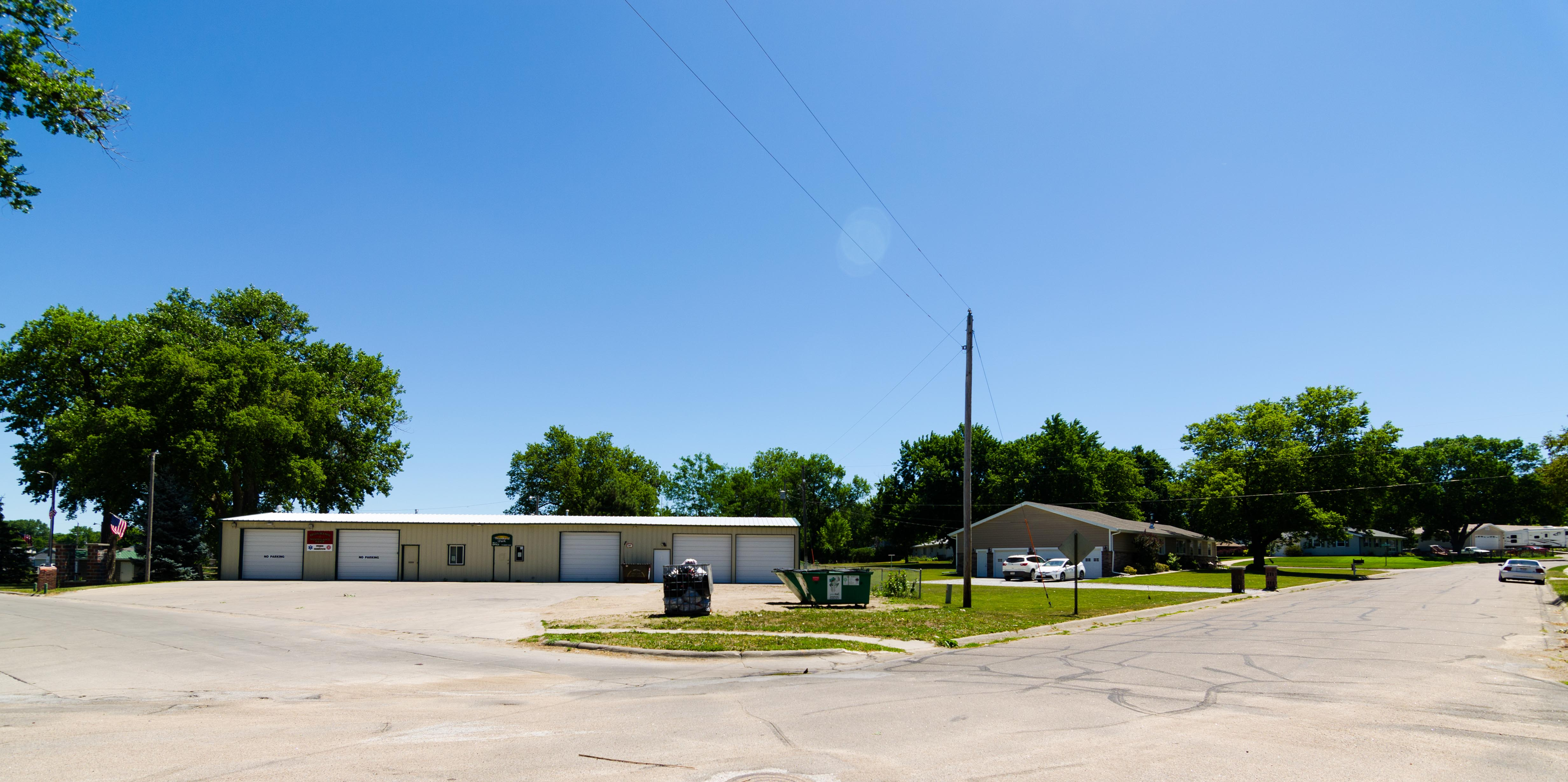
- Woodland Drive in Woodland Park

- Location within Nebraska Location within the United States
- Coordinates: 42°03′15″N 97°20′43″W
- Country: United States
- State: Nebraska
- County: Stanton

Area
  - Total: 1.56 sq mi (4.05 km^{2})
  - Land: 1.56 sq mi (4.05 km^{2})
  - Water: 0 sq mi (0.00 km^{2})
- Elevation: 1,686 ft (514 m)

Population (2020)
  - Total: 1,830
  - Density: 1,169.9/sq mi (451.69/km^{2})
- Time zone: UTC-6 (Central (CST))
  - Summer (DST): UTC-5 (CDT)
- ZIP code: 68701
- Area codes: 402 & 531
- GNIS feature ID: 2587012

Woodland Park is an unincorporated community and census-designated place (CDP) in Stanton County, Nebraska, United States. As of the 2020 census, Woodland Park had a population of 1,830. Nebraska Highway 35 passes through the community.

== Geography ==
According to the U.S. Census Bureau, the community has an area of 1.525 square miles (3.95 km^{2}), all land.

== Demographics ==
Historical population
Census	Pop.	Note	%±
2020	1,830		—
U.S. Decennial Census
