= Yankee Hill, Nebraska =

- Census-designated place
- Location within Nebraska Location within the United States
- Coordinates: 40°45′50″N 96°43′51″W
- Country: United States
- State: Nebraska
- County: Lancaster

Area
  - Total: 3.98 sq mi (10.30 km^{2})
  - Land: 3.98 sq mi (10.30 km^{2})
  - Water: 0 sq mi (0.00 km^{2})
- Elevation: 1,188 ft (362 m)

Population (2020)
  - Total: 286
  - Density: 71.9/sq mi (27.76/km^{2})
- Time zone: UTC-6 (Central (CST))
  - Summer (DST): UTC-5 (CDT)
- Area codes: 402 & 531
- GNIS feature ID: 2583908

Yankee Hill is an unincorporated community and census-designated place (CDP) in Lancaster County, Nebraska, United States. Its population was 286 as of the 2020 census.

== Geography ==
According to the U.S. Census Bureau, the community has an area of 2.867 square miles (7.43 km^{2}), all land.

== Education ==
Its school district is Lincoln Public Schools.

== Demographics ==
Historical population
Census	Pop.	Note	%±
2020	286		—
U.S. Decennial Census
