= Ames, Nebraska =

- CDP
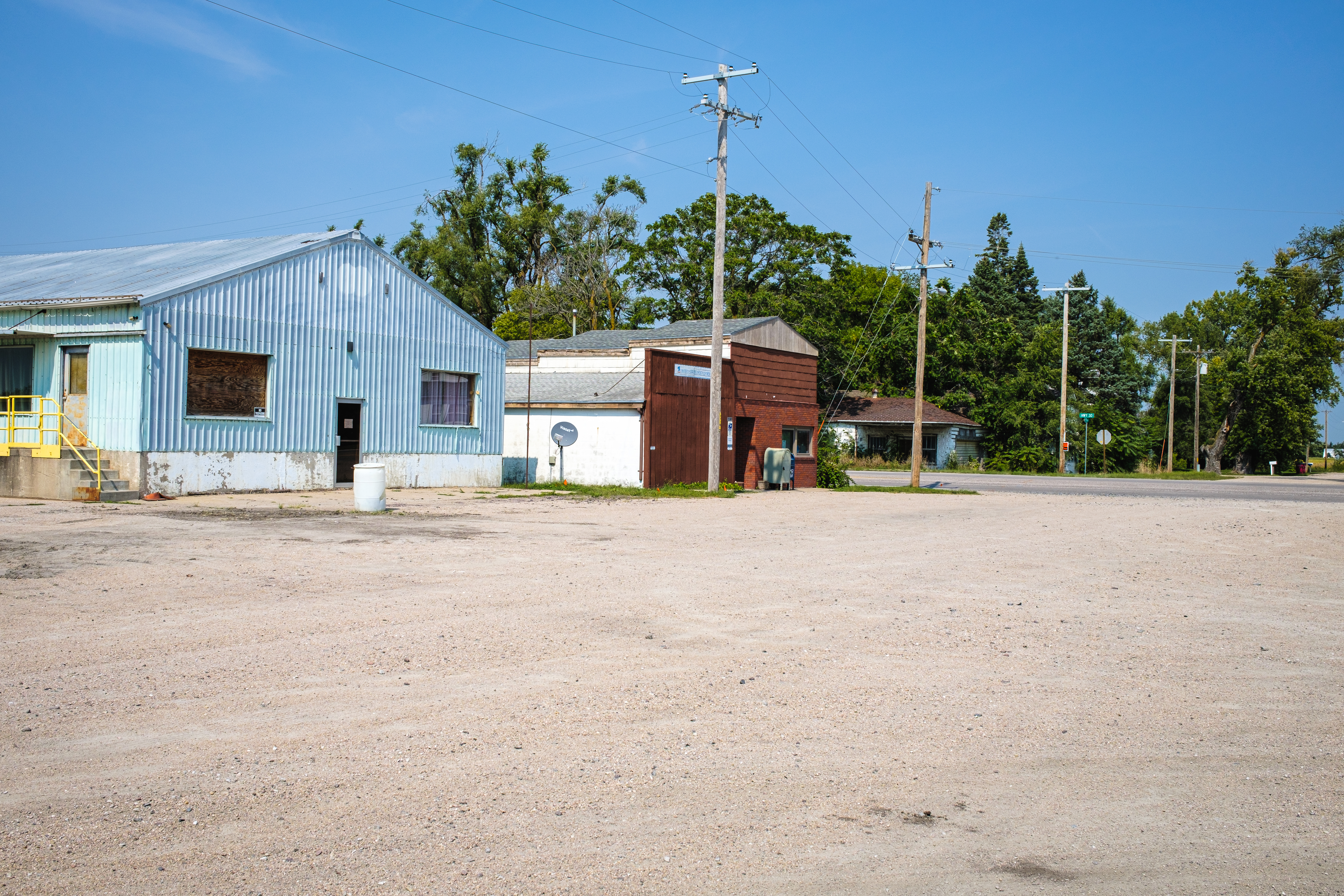
- Downtown Ames

- Location within the state of Nebraska Ames (the United States)
- Coordinates: 41°26′57″N 96°37′35″W
- Country: United States
- State: Nebraska
- County: Dodge

Area
  - Total: 0.33 sq mi (0.85 km^{2})
  - Land: 0.33 sq mi (0.85 km^{2})
  - Water: 0.0039 sq mi (0.01 km^{2})
- Elevation: 1,227 ft (374 m)

Population (2020)
  - Total: 14
  - Density: 42.9/sq mi (16.55/km^{2})
- FIPS code: 31-01220
- GNIS feature ID: 2630666

Ames is an unincorporated community and census-designated place (CDP) in southern Dodge County, Nebraska, United States. As of the 2020 census it had a population of 14.

Ames lies along U.S. Route 30, west of the city of Fremont, the county seat of Dodge County. Its elevation is 1,227 feet (374 m) above sea level, and it is located at about 41°27′8″N 96°37′30″W (41.4523625, -96.6251658). It has a post office with the ZIP code of 68621.

== History ==
A post office was established at Ames in 1885. The community was formerly named Ketchum but renamed Ames, likely for Oakes Ames, a Union Pacific Railroad official. Ames was a station and shipping point on the Union Pacific Railroad.

== Demographics ==
Historical population
Census	Pop.	Note	%±
2010	24		—
2020	14		−41.7%
U.S. Decennial Census

Ames' population declined from 24 to 14 between the 2010 and 2020 Censuses.
