= Loretto, Nebraska =

- Census-designated place
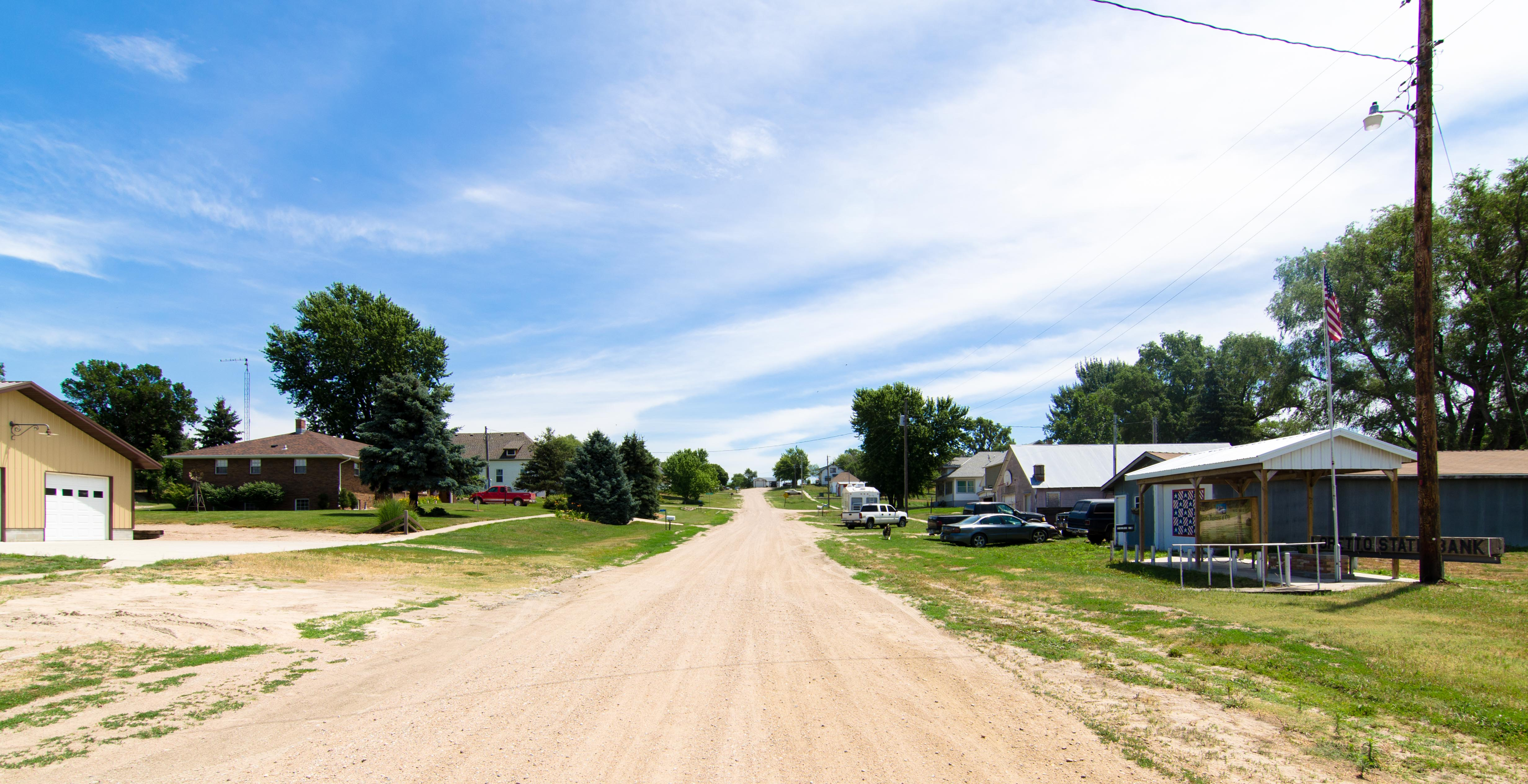
- Elm Street in Loretto

- Location within the state of Nebraska
- Coordinates: 41°45′48″N 98°04′54″W
- Country: United States
- State: Nebraska
- County: Boone

Area
  - Total: 0.28 sq mi (0.73 km^{2})
  - Land: 0.28 sq mi (0.73 km^{2})
  - Water: 0 sq mi (0.00 km^{2})
- Elevation: 1,828 ft (557 m)

Population (2020)
  - Total: 50
  - Density: 178.2/sq mi (68.81/km^{2})
- Time zone: UTC-6 (Central (CST))
  - Summer (DST): UTC-5 (CDT)
- ZIP code: 68620
- Area codes: 402 and 531
- FIPS code: 31-29155
- GNIS feature ID: 2612512

Loretto is an unincorporated community and census-designated place in Boone County, Nebraska, United States. As of the 2020 census, the community had a population of 50.

== History ==
Loretto was originally called Loran, in honor of Loran Clark, a pioneer settler, but when it was discovered another town of that name already existed elsewhere in the state, it was renamed Loretto in order to avoid repetition. The present name is after Loreto, in Italy. A post office was established at Loretto in 1888, and remained in operation until it was discontinued in 1971. A state bank named Loretto State Bank was established in 1909. At its peak in the 1920s Loretto was also home to a cheese factory, several general stores, a butcher shop, and hotel.

== Geography ==
Loretto is located in north-central Boone County along Beaver Creek, a tributary of the Loup River. Nebraska Highway 14 passes through the CDP, leading southeast 7 miles (11 km) to Albion, the county seat, and north 6 miles (10 km) to Petersburg.

According to the United States Census Bureau, the Loretto CDP has a total area of 0.27 square miles (0.7 km^{2}), all land.

== Demographics ==
Historical population
Census	Pop.	Note	%±
2020	50		—
U.S. Decennial Census
