= Woodland Hills, Nebraska =

- Unincorporated community
- Location within Nebraska Location within the United States
- Coordinates: 40°45′04″N 96°25′16″W
- Country: United States
- State: Nebraska
- County: Otoe

Area
  - Total: 0.37 sq mi (0.95 km^{2})
  - Land: 0.36 sq mi (0.93 km^{2})
  - Water: 0.0077 sq mi (0.02 km^{2})
- Elevation: 1,263 ft (385 m)

Population (2020)
  - Total: 232
  - Density: 648.9/sq mi (250.55/km^{2})
- Time zone: UTC-6 (Central (CST))
  - Summer (DST): UTC-5 (CDT)
- ZIP code: 68347
- Area codes: 402 & 531
- GNIS feature ID: 2583907

Woodland Hills is an unincorporated community and census-designated place in Otoe County, Nebraska, United States. Its population was 232 as of the 2020 census.

== Geography ==
According to the U.S. Census Bureau, the community has an area of 0.366 square miles (0.95 km^{2}); 0.358 square miles (0.93 km^{2}) of its area is land, and 0.008 square miles (0.021 km^{2}) is water.

== Education ==
Most of Woodland Hills is in Waverly School District 145 while a portion is in Palmyra District OR-1.

== Demographics ==
Historical population
| Census | Pop. | Note | %± |
|---|---|---|---|
| 2020 | 232 | | — |
U.S. Decennial Census
