= Berea, Nebraska =

- Census-designated place
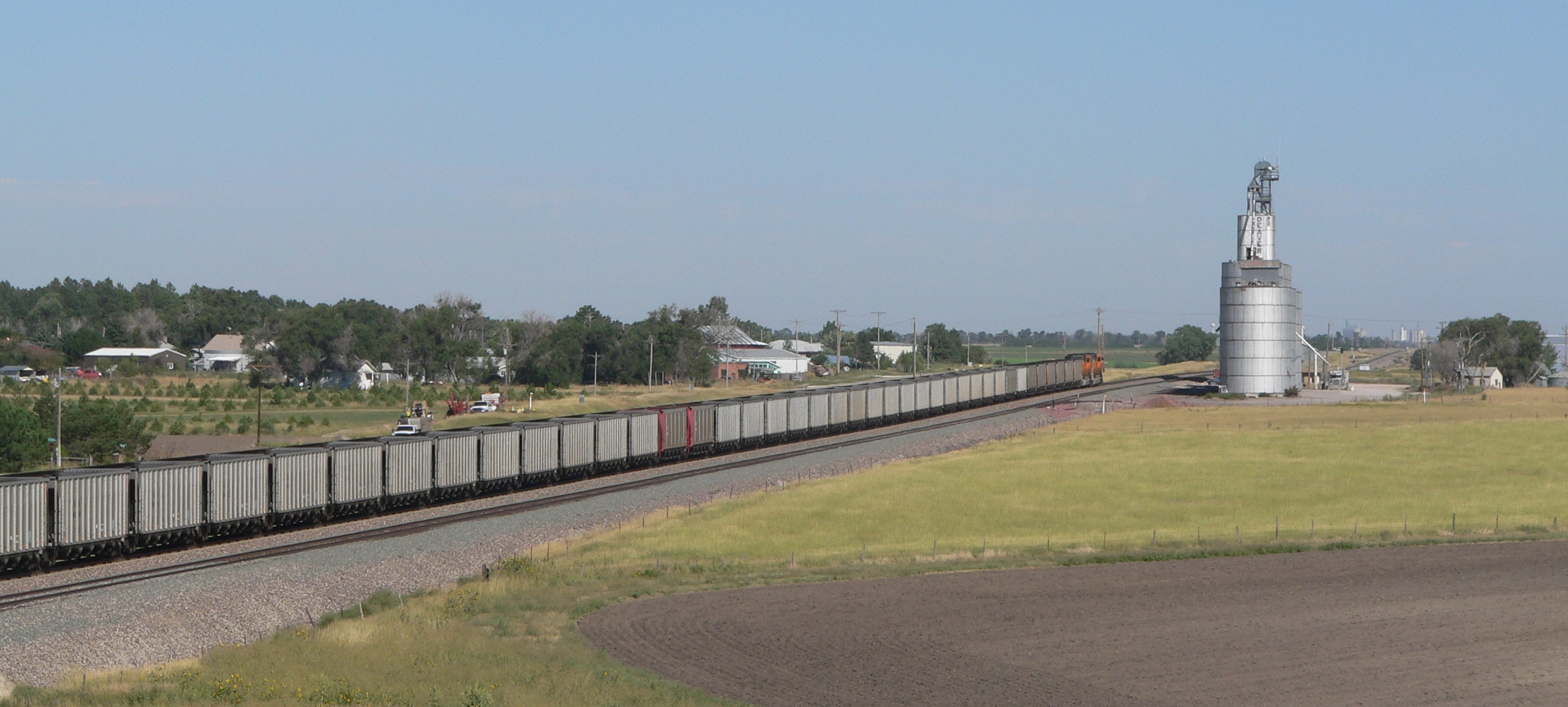
- Berea, seen from the southeast across the BNSF tracks

- Location within Nebraska
- Coordinates: 42°12′44″N 102°58′59″W
- Country: United States
- State: Nebraska
- County: Box Butte
- First settled: 1889

Area
  - Total: 1.19 sq mi (3.09 km^{2})
  - Land: 1.19 sq mi (3.09 km^{2})
  - Water: 0 sq mi (0.00 km^{2})
- Elevation: 4,141 ft (1,262 m)

Population (2020)
  - Total: 49
  - Density: 41.1/sq mi (15.86/km^{2})
- Time zone: UTC-7 (Mountain (MST))
  - Summer (DST): UTC-6 (MDT)
- ZIP code: 69301
- Area code: 308
- FIPS code: 31-04545
- GNIS feature ID: 2583875

Berea is an unincorporated community and census-designated place in Box Butte County, in the northwestern part of the state of Nebraska in the Midwestern United States. It had a population of 49 at the 2020 census.

== History ==
The Burlington Railroad reached the area of Berea in 1889, and railroad support facilities, including a water tower and section house, were built on the site. The town was founded by a group of settlers, originally from Ohio, who named their new home after Berea, Ohio.

In 1890–91, the town had a population of 50, and a general store, newspaper, and post office; five years later, a school and community hall had been added.

The population of Berea fluctuated over the next century. The town was of some local importance as a shipping stop along the railroad, although it never developed many commercial enterprises. A garage opened in 1921, repairing both automobiles and farm machinery. In 1925, when the population was estimated at 35, the post office was re-opened; it closed again a year later. A refinery was operated in the town in 1935 by the Utility Petroleum Company of Chadron.

In 1960, a population of 75 was reported for Berea. The District 39 school was closed in 2007, at which time it had nine students enrolled. In 2009, the town's population was estimated to be 50.

== Geography ==
Berea is approximately 10 miles (16 km) northwest of Alliance, the county seat of Box Butte County. It lies along the west side of the BNSF Railway tracks, and of Nebraska Highway 2 near its junction with U.S. Route 385.

== Demographics ==
Historical population
Census	Pop.	Note	%±
2020	49		—
U.S. Decennial Census

== Economy ==
Berea has no commercial district. The Kelley Bean Company operates a grain elevator beside the railroad tracks; the elevator has a capacity of 633,000 US bushels (22,300 m^{3}), and the siding has space for nine railroad cars. In 2010, West Plains Grain Inc. announced plans to build a high-speed grain-loading facility with a capacity of 126 rail cars near Berea.
