= Martin, Nebraska =

- Census-designated place
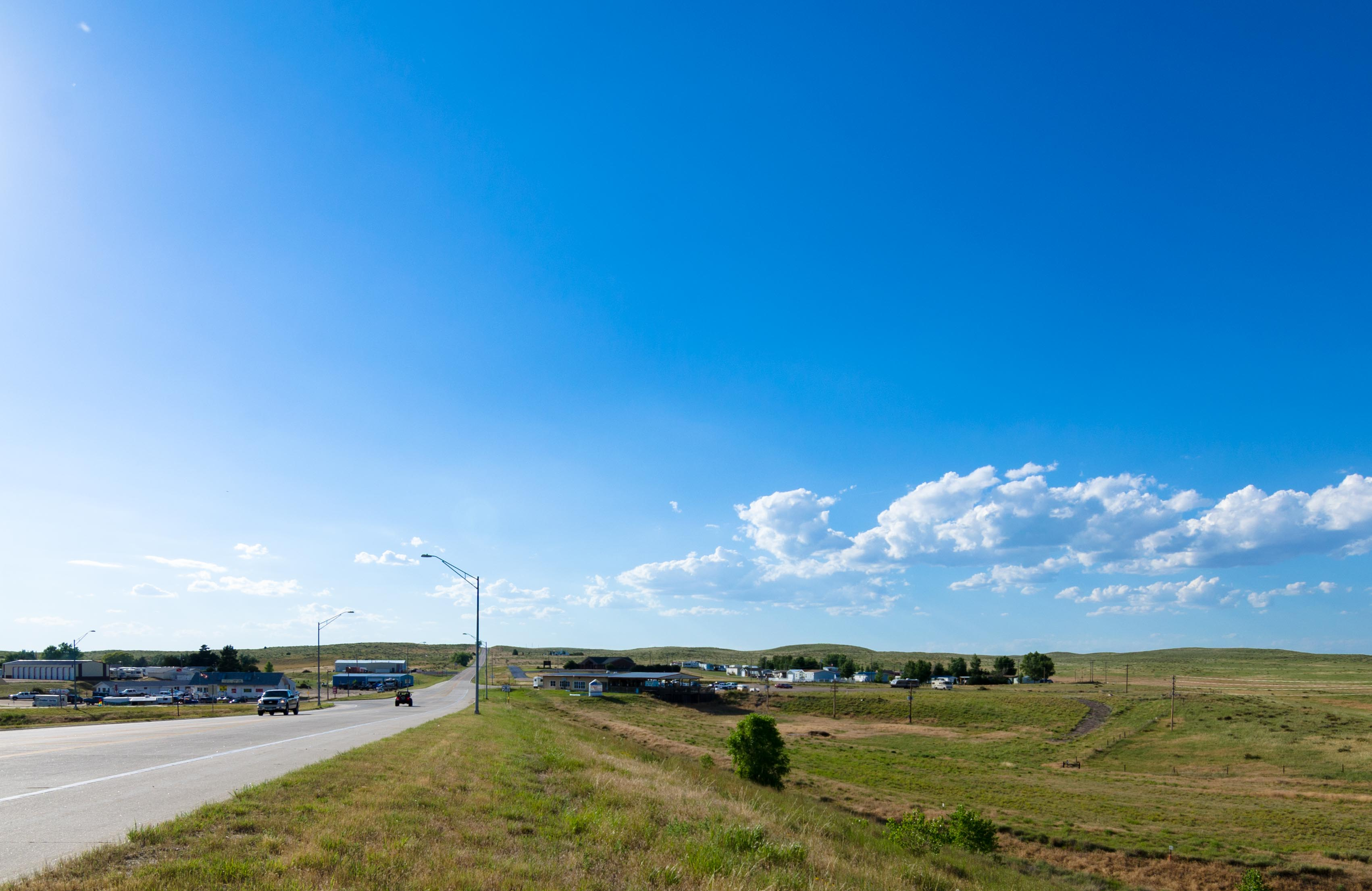
- Martin from Highway 61

- Location within Nebraska Location within the United States
- Coordinates: 41°15′29″N 101°42′32″W
- Country: United States
- State: Nebraska
- County: Keith

Area
  - Total: 0.36 sq mi (0.93 km^{2})
  - Land: 0.36 sq mi (0.93 km^{2})
  - Water: 0 sq mi (0.00 km^{2})
- Elevation: 3,350 ft (1,020 m)

Population (2020)
  - Total: 76
  - Density: 211.7/sq mi (81.73/km^{2})
- Time zone: UTC-7 (Mountain (MST))
  - Summer (DST): UTC-6 (MDT)
- ZIP code: 69144
- FIPS code: 31-30905
- GNIS feature ID: 2583890

Martin is an unincorporated community and census-designated place in Keith County, Nebraska, United States. As of the 2020 census, Martin had a population of 76. Martin Bay is one of the most popular recreation areas on Lake McConaughy.

== History ==
Martin got its start following construction of the Union Pacific Railroad through the territory.

== Geography ==
Martin is in north-central Keith County, on the northern side of Lake McConaughy just north of Kingsley Dam, the lake's outlet. The lake is an impoundment on the North Platte River.

The community sits at the intersection of Nebraska Highways 61 and 92. Highway 61 leads south 12 miles (19 km) to Ogallala, the Keith county seat, and north 28 miles (45 km) to Arthur, while Highway 92 leads west along the north side of Lake McConaughy 25 miles (40 km) to Lewellen.

According to the U.S. Census Bureau, the Martin CDP has an area of 0.36 square miles (0.93 km^{2}), all land.

== Demographics ==
Historical population
Census	Pop.	Note	%±
2020	76		—
U.S. Decennial Census
