= Aten, Nebraska =

- Unincorporated Community
- Location within Nebraska Location within the United States
- Coordinates: 42°50′24″N 97°26′27″W
- Country: United States
- State: Nebraska
- County: Cedar
- Founded: 1881

Area
  - Total: 1.70 sq mi (4.40 km^{2})
  - Land: 1.70 sq mi (4.40 km^{2})
  - Water: 0 sq mi (0.00 km^{2})
- Elevation: 1,204 ft (367 m)

Population (2020)
  - Total: 134
  - Density: 78.8/sq mi (30.44/km^{2})
- FIPS code: 31-02480
- GNIS feature ID: 2583873

Aten is an unincorporated community and census-designated place (CDP) in Cedar County, Nebraska, United States. As of the 2020 census, Aten had a population of 134.

== Geography ==
Aten is located in northwestern Cedar County, bordered by the Missouri River and the state of South Dakota to the north. Nebraska Highway 121 passes through the community, leading east 2 miles (3 km) to U.S. Route 81 at a point 2 miles (3 km) south of Yankton, South Dakota, and west 2 miles (3 km) to Gavins Point Dam, which impounds the Missouri River to form Lewis and Clark Lake.

== History ==
Aten was founded in 1881 and named for postmaster John Aten. A post office was established in Aten in 1882, and remained in operation until it was discontinued in 1906.

== Demographics ==
Historical population
Census	Pop.	Note	%±
2010	112		—
2020	134		19.6%
U.S. Decennial Census
