= Westerville, Nebraska =

- Census-designated place
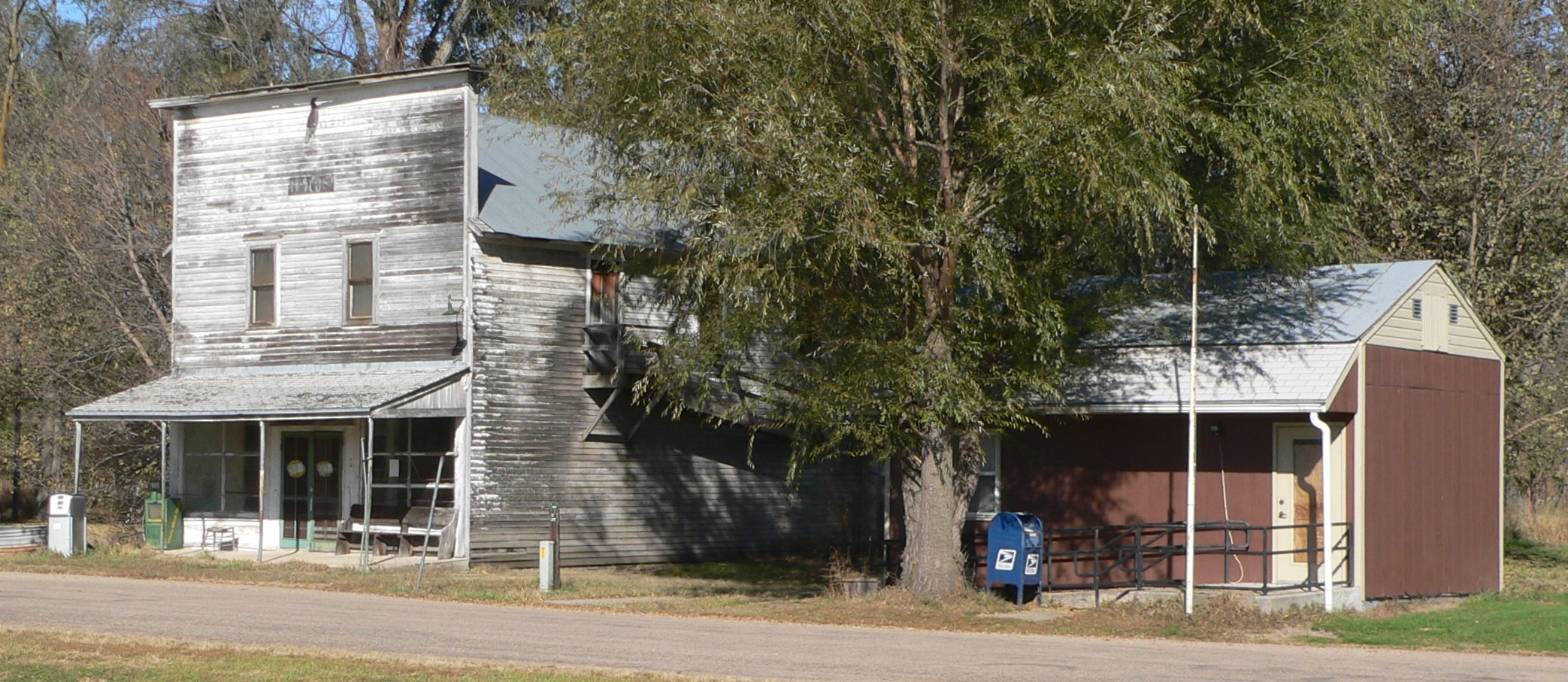
- I.O.O.F. Hall and post office in Westerville
- Interactive map of Westerville, Nebraska
- Country: United States
- State: Nebraska
- County: Custer

Area
  - Total: 0.13 sq mi (0.34 km^{2})
  - Land: 0.13 sq mi (0.34 km^{2})
  - Water: 0 sq mi (0.00 km^{2})
- Elevation: 2,326 ft (709 m)

Population (2020)
  - Total: 31
  - Density: 236.3/sq mi (91.22/km^{2})
- Time zone: UTC-6 (Central (CST))
  - Summer (DST): UTC-5 (CDT)
- ZIP code: 68881
- Area code: 308
- FIPS code: 31-52330
- GNIS ID: 2583905

Westerville is an unincorporated community and census-designated place in Custer County, Nebraska, United States. It is located at the intersection of U.S. Route 183 and Nebraska Highway 70. As of the 2020 census, the population was 31.

== Demographics ==
Westerville has been located within a census-designated place (CDP), defined by the United States Census Bureau for statistical research purposes and bearing the village's name, since 2010. Demographic census-based information obtained since that date in the name of Westerville applies to the entire CDP, not just the village proper. As of the 2010 census the CDP had a population of 39.

Historical population
Census	Pop.	Note	%±
2020	31		—
U.S. Decennial Census

== History ==
Westerville was named for James Westervelt, a local storekeeper on whose land the townsite was platted August 11, 1880. The Westerville post office was established in 1882. County fairs were held in Westerville in 1883 and 1884.

According to History Nebraska, Westerville was the first town in Custer County. It was home to the first frame church in the county; the first newspaper, The Custer Leader, and the first doctor, lawyer, banker, school teachers, monument cutter, and general stores in the county. Along with the post office, the town was home to sod houses, a hotel, blacksmith shop, livery barn, and flour mill. The Custer County County Agricultural Society was in Westerville, and the first two county fairs were held in town in 1881 and 1882. When a railroad was built farther south of Westerville in 1886, the town gradually declined. It became unincorporated in the 1960s.

Westerville was the nearest town to John W. Speese (1866-1914), an African American farmer who homesteaded there in 1881. After 18 years of running his place, Speese wrote an account of farm life for the Omaha World-Herald about life on his 238 acre farm, which included a timber lot, alfalfa, cattle and more. At that time, he reported he was out of debt and was reasonably successful.
