= Lindy, Nebraska =

Unincorporated community in Nebraska, United States

- Census-designated place
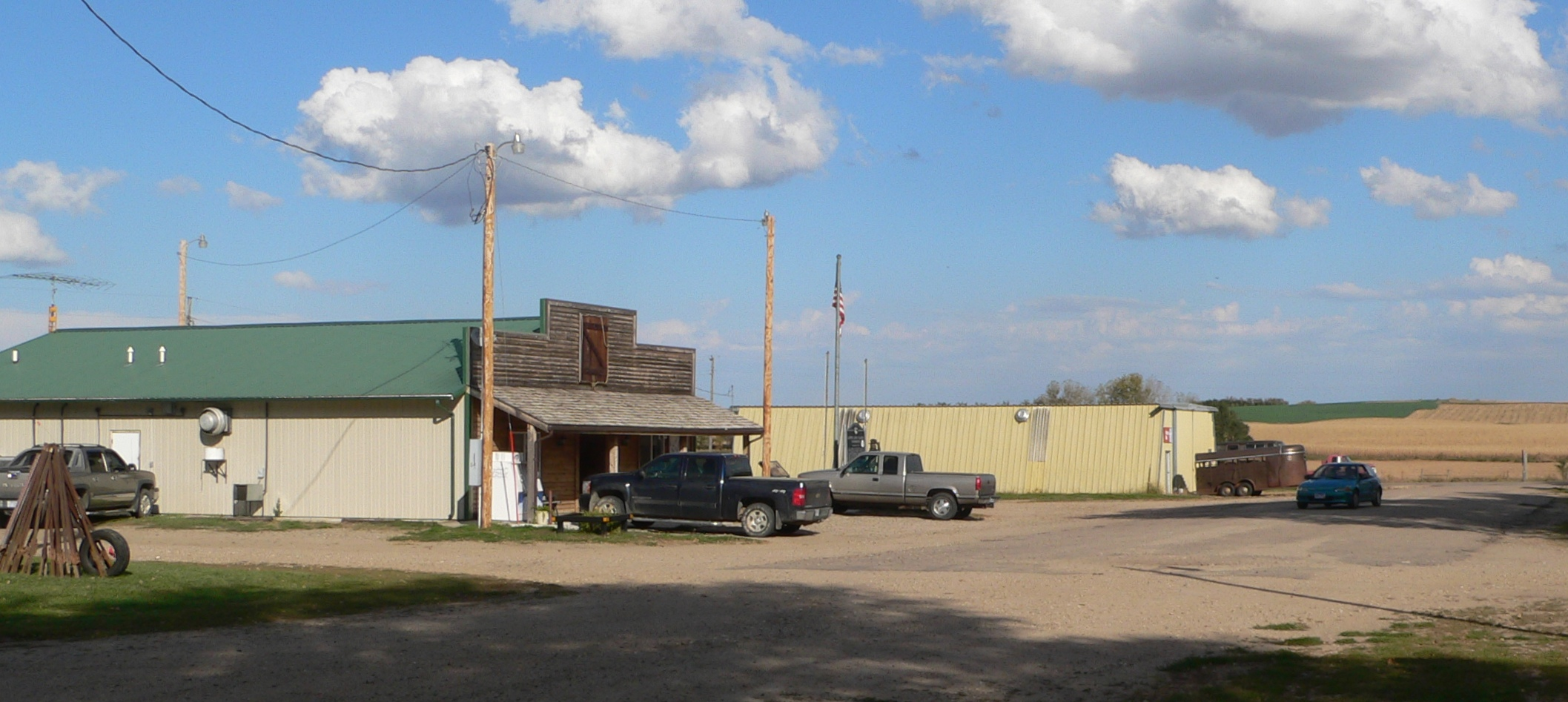
- Downtown Lindy; at left is the Lindy Country Club

- Location within Nebraska Location within the United States
- Coordinates: 42°44′03″N 97°44′24″W
- Country: United States
- State: Nebraska
- County: Knox
- Townsite surveyed: 1928

Area
  - Total: 1.00 sq mi (2.59 km^{2})
  - Land: 1.00 sq mi (2.59 km^{2})
  - Water: 0 sq mi (0.00 km^{2})
- Elevation: 1,611 ft (491 m)

Population (2020)
  - Total: 13
  - Density: 13.0/sq mi (5.03/km^{2})
- Time zone: UTC-6 (Central (CST))
  - Summer (DST): UTC-5 (CDT)
- ZIP code: 68718
- Area code: 402
- FIPS code: 31-28140
- GNIS feature ID: 2583888

Lindy is an unincorporated community and census-designated place located on the Santee Sioux Reservation in Knox County, in the northeastern part of the state of Nebraska in the Midwestern United States. As of the 2020 census, Lindy had a population of 13.

== Geography ==
Lindy is in northeastern Knox County, 7 miles (11 km) south of the Missouri River and the South Dakota border. Nebraska Highway 12 forms the southern edge of the community; the highway leads east 12 miles (19 km) to Crofton and west 15 miles (24 km) to Niobrara.

According to the U.S. Census Bureau, the Lindy CDP has an area of 1.00 square mile (2.59 km^{2}), all land. The community is in the valley of Hobo Creek, a southwest-flowing tributary of Howe Creek, which in turn flows west to Bazile Creek, a north-flowing tributary of the Missouri River.

== Demographics ==
Historical population
Census	Pop.	Note	%±
2020	13		—
U.S. Decennial Census

== History ==
Lindy was established late in the state's history. The townsite was surveyed in 1928, in response to demand for a local marketing and shopping center. Development was further encouraged by a rumor, which later proved unfounded, suggesting that a railroad line might be built through the area. The new town was named after Charles Lindbergh, nicknamed "Lucky Lindy", who the year before had made his celebrated non-stop solo flight from New York to Paris.

During its heyday, Lindy had a number of businesses, including a hardware store, a barbershop, an ice-cream parlor, a blacksmith shop, and an electrical-appliances shop. It also boasted a large hall with a full basement for a garage, a dance hall and movie theater on the second floor, and office and living space on the third. This building was dismantled in 1944. From 1944 to 1958, the local Addison Telephone Company operated out of Lindy.

In later years, Lindy's population declined and its businesses closed. In 1978, it had a population of 38. In the late 1980s and early 1990s, the town's feed store, general store, and gas pumps were shut down or moved away. By 2002, there were 13 residents.

== Lindy today ==
Lindy is an unincorporated community. It is home to one commercial enterprise, the Lindy Country Club restaurant and bar; to a single church, the Good Shepherd Evangelical Lutheran Church; and to a fire hall, operated by the Bloomfield Volunteer Fire Department and Rescue Unit.

Lindy is located on Nebraska Highway 12. It is within the Santee Sioux Reservation.

In 2001, a number of northeastern Nebraska communities formed Shannon Trail Promoters, with the goal of increasing tourism in the forthcoming bicentennial year of the Lewis and Clark Expedition. The organization commissioned thirteen wooden chainsaw sculptures of Private George Shannon, a member of the expedition who became separated from the group in August 1804 and wandered lost for 16 days before rediscovering the party. These statues were placed in participating communities along a 240-mile (390 km) Shannon Trail. Sixteen wayside markers recounting aspects of Shannon's career were also installed along the trail, which runs through the region in which Shannon is thought to have traveled while trying to find and rejoin the expedition. A statue and a marker were placed in Lindy, beside the country club.
