= Holmesville, Nebraska =

- Census-designated place
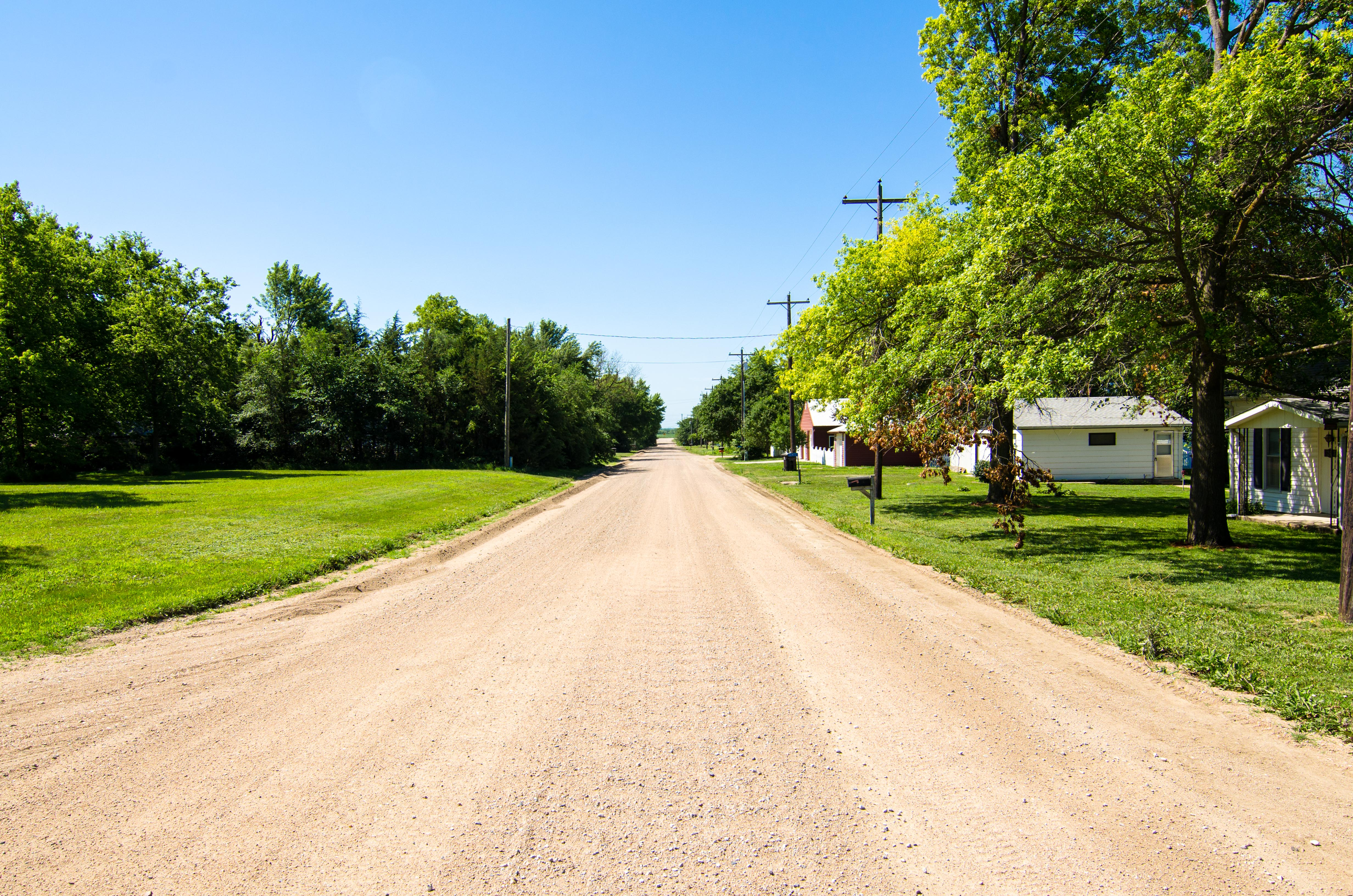
- 2nd Street in Holmesville

- Location within Nebraska Location within the United States
- Coordinates: 40°12′03″N 96°39′31″W
- Country: United States
- State: Nebraska
- County: Gage

Area
  - Total: 0.22 sq mi (0.58 km^{2})
  - Land: 0.22 sq mi (0.58 km^{2})
  - Water: 0 sq mi (0.00 km^{2})
- Elevation: 1,263 ft (385 m)

Population (2020)
  - Total: 60
  - Density: 268.3/sq mi (103.58/km^{2})
- Time zone: UTC-6 (Central (CST))
  - Summer (DST): UTC-5 (CDT)
- ZIP code: 68310
- Area code: 402
- FIPS code: 31-22780
- GNIS feature ID: 2583881

Holmesville is a census-designated place (CDP) in Gage County, Nebraska, United States. As of the 2020 census, Holmesville had a population of 60.

== History ==
Holmesville got its start in 1880, following construction of the railroad through the territory. It was named for its postmaster, Morgan L. Holmes.

== Geography ==
Holmesville is in central Gage County, on the east side of the Big Blue River, a south-flowing tributary of the Kansas River. The community is 9 miles (14 km) southeast of Beatrice, the Gage County seat.

According to the U.S. Census Bureau, the Holmesville CDP has an area of 0.22 square miles (0.58 km^{2}), all land.

== Demographics ==
Historical population
Census	Pop.	Note	%±
2020	60		—
U.S. Decennial Census
