= Walton, Nebraska =

- Census-designated place
- Location within Nebraska Location within the United States
- Coordinates: 40°47′46″N 96°33′55″W
- Country: United States
- State: Nebraska
- County: Lancaster

Area
  - Total: 3.46 sq mi (8.97 km^{2})
  - Land: 3.46 sq mi (8.97 km^{2})
  - Water: 0 sq mi (0.00 km^{2})
- Elevation: 1,217 ft (371 m)

Population (2020)
  - Total: 351
  - Density: 101.3/sq mi (39.12/km^{2})
- Time zone: UTC-6 (Central (CST))
  - Summer (DST): UTC-5 (CDT)
- ZIP code: 68461
- Area code: 402
- FIPS code: 31-51280
- GNIS feature ID: 2583903

Walton is an unincorporated community and census-designated place (CDP) in Lancaster County, Nebraska, United States. Walton had a population of 351 as of the 2020 census. The headquarters of the Cornhusker Council of the Boy Scouts of America are located in Walton.

== History ==
The first and only post office in Walton was established in 1880. The community was named for A. Walton, a pioneer settler.

== Geography ==
Walton is in eastern Lancaster County, just east of the city limits of Lincoln, the state capital. U.S. Route 34 is the northern border of the CDP; the highway leads west 7 miles (11 km) to the center of Lincoln and east 33 miles (53 km) to Union.

According to the U.S. Census Bureau, the Walton CDP has an area of 3.6 square miles (9.2 km^{2}), all land. It is drained by Stevens Creek, which forms the eastern boundary of the CDP and flows north to Salt Creek, a northeast-flowing tributary of the Platte River.

== Education ==
It is in the Waverly School District 145.

== Demographics ==
Historical population
Census	Pop.	Note	%±
2020	351		—
U.S. Decennial Census

Walton has a population of 306 people with a median age of 52. The population is 51.3% male (157) and 48.7% female (149). Walton is 97.4% White (298), 1.6% African American or Black (5), 0.7% American Indian or Alaska Native (2), and 1.6% Asian (5).
