= Belmar, Nebraska =

- Census-designated place
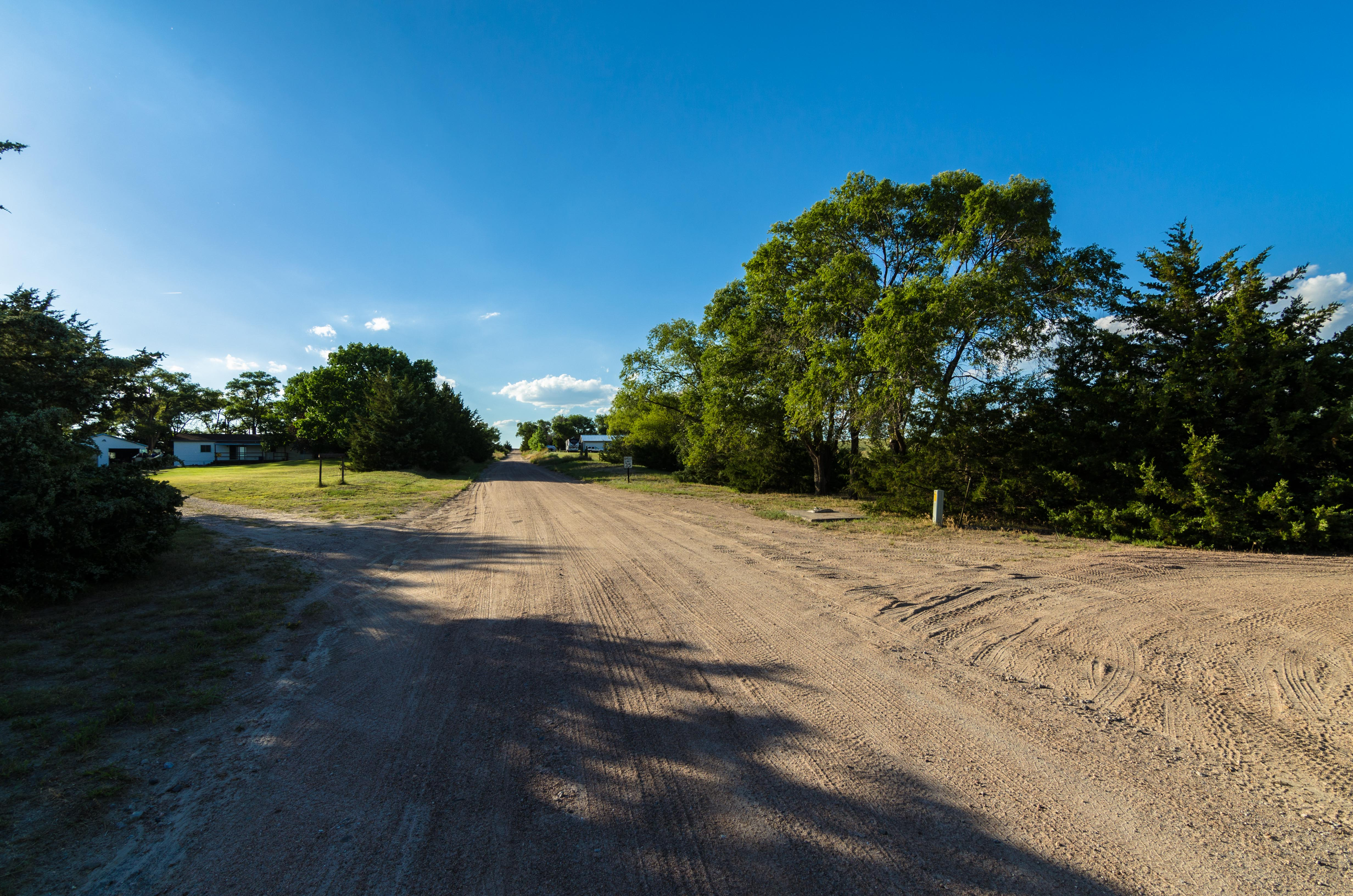
- Creekside Acres Road in Belmar

- Location within Nebraska Location within the United States
- Coordinates: 41°18′20″N 101°56′05″W
- Country: United States
- State: Nebraska
- County: Keith

Area
  - Total: 4.58 sq mi (11.87 km^{2})
  - Land: 4.58 sq mi (11.87 km^{2})
  - Water: 0 sq mi (0.00 km^{2})
- Elevation: 3,343 ft (1,019 m)

Population (2020)
  - Total: 199
  - Density: 43.4/sq mi (16.77/km^{2})
- Time zone: UTC-7 (Mountain (MST))
  - Summer (DST): UTC-6 (MDT)
- ZIP code: 69147
- FIPS code: 31-04055
- GNIS feature ID: 2583874

Belmar is an unincorporated community and census-designated place (CDP) in Keith, Nebraska, United States. As of the 2020 census, Belmar had a population of 199.

== History ==
Belmar got its start following construction of the Union Pacific Railroad through the territory. It was likely named for a railroad official.

A post office was established at Belmar in 1910, and remained in operation until it was discontinued in 1941.

== Geography ==
Belmar is in northwestern Keith County, on the north side of Lake McConaughy, a reservoir on the North Platte River. Nebraska Highway 92 runs through the community, leading west 12 miles (19 km) to Lewellen and east 6 miles (10 km) to Lemoyne. Ogallala, the Keith county seat, is 24 miles (39 km) to the southeast via Highways 92 and 61.

According to the U.S. Census Bureau, the Belmar CDP has an area of 4.6 square miles (11.9 km^{2}), all land.

== Demographics ==
Historical population
| Census | Pop. | Note | %± |
|---|---|---|---|
| 2020 | 199 | | — |
U.S. Decennial Census
