= Lincoln metropolitan area, Nebraska =

Lincoln Metropolitan Area Lincoln, Nebraska Metropolitan Area
- Metropolitan Statistical Area
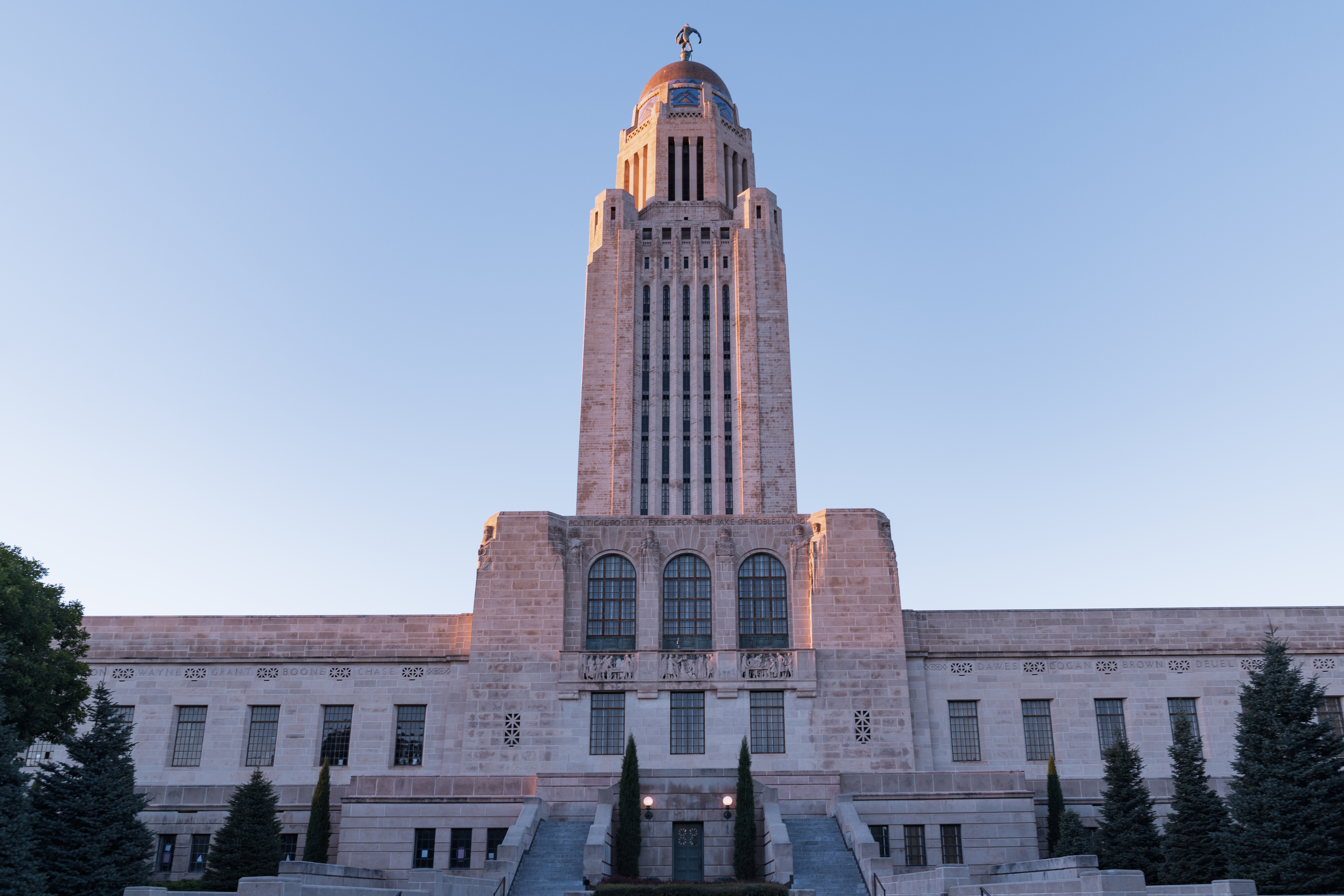
- Nebraska State Capitol
Interactive Map of Lincoln–Beatrice, NE CSA
City of Lincoln
Lincoln, NE MSA
Beatrice, NE µSA
- Country: United States
- State: Nebraska
- Principal city: Lincoln
- Other city: Beatrice

Area
  - Total: 1,420 sq mi (3,680 km^{2})

Population
  - Total: 344,387

GDP
  - Total: $25.459 billion (2022)
- Time zone: UTC−6 (CST)
  - Summer (DST): UTC−5 (CDT)

The Lincoln, NE Metropolitan Statistical Area, as defined by the U.S. Office of Management and Budget, is a metropolitan area consisting of two counties in Nebraska, anchored by the city of Lincoln. As of the 2020 census, the metropolitan statistical area (MSA) had a population of 340,217. The MSA is a component of the Lincoln–Beatrice, NE Combined Statistical Area, which adds the Beatrice, NE micropolitan area (Gage County). The combined statistical area has an estimated population of 373,792 as of 2025.

== Counties ==
- Lancaster
- Seward

== Communities ==
The following is a list of the communities within the Lincoln metropolitan area and their respective populations in the 2020 United States census in descending order.

=== More than 250,000 ===
- Lincoln – 291,082 (Principal City)

=== 1,000–10,000 ===
- Seward – 7,643
- Waverly – 4,279
- Hickman – 2,607
- Milford – 2,155
- Bennet – 1,082

=== 200–1,000 ===
- Utica – 840
- Firth – 649
- Malcolm – 457
- Beaver Crossing – 375
- Walton – 351
- Yankee Hill – 286
- Hallam – 268
- Staplehurst – 236
- Panama – 235
- Pleasant Dale – 218
- Garland – 210
- Roca – 201

=== Fewer than 200 ===
- Denton – 189
- Goehner – 181
- Bee – 171
- Cheney – 164
- Raymond – 159
- Sprague – 136
- Davey – 135
- Martel – 125
- Cordova – 92
- Princeton – 51
- Emerald – 45
- Tamora – 40
- Prairie Home – 38
- Agnew - 30
- Kramer – 26

=== Additional Communities ===
The following are additional communities in the Lincoln metropolitan area not recognized as populated places by the US Census Bureau, in alphabetical order.

- Arbor
- Berks
- Grover
- Holland
- Rokeby
- Ruby
- Saltillo

== Demographics ==
Historical population
Census	Pop.	Note	%±
1900	64,835		—
1910	73,793		13.8%
1920	85,902		16.4%
1930	100,324		16.8%
1940	100,585		0.3%
1950	119,742		19.0%
1960	168,853		41.0%
1970	182,432		8.0%
1980	208,673		14.4%
1990	229,091		9.8%
2000	266,787		16.5%
2010	302,157		13.3%
2020	340,217		12.6%
2023 (est.)	344,387		1.2%
U.S. Decennial Census

As of the census of 2000, there were 266,787 people, 105,200 households, and 64,917 families residing within the MSA. The racial makeup of the MSA was 90.56% White, 2.66% African American, 0.61% Native American, 2.70% Asian, 0.06% Pacific Islander, 1.61% from other races, and 1.80% from two or more races. Hispanic or Latino of any race were 3.23% of the population.

The median income for a household in the MSA was $42,275, and the median income for a family was $52,745. Males had a median income of $33,469 versus $23,972 for females. The per capita income for the MSA was $19,822.

County	Seat	2025 estimate	2020 census	Change	Area	Density
Lancaster	Lincoln	334,049	322,608	+3.55%	846.383 sq mi (2,192.12 km^{2})	395/sq mi (152/km^{2})
Seward	Seward	18,032	17,609	+2.40%	575.886 sq mi (1,491.54 km^{2})	31/sq mi (12/km^{2})
Total		352,081	340,217	+3.49%	1,422.269 sq mi (3,683.66 km^{2})	248/sq mi (96/km^{2})

=== Lincoln–Beatrice, NE Combined Statistical Area ===
Statistical Area	2025 estimate	2020 Census	Change	Area	Density
Lincoln, NE Metropolitan Statistical Area	352,081	340,217	+3.49%	1,422.269 sq mi (3,683.66 km^{2})	248/sq mi (96/km^{2})
Beatrice, NE Micropolitan Statistical Area	21,711	21,704	+0.03%	859.950 sq mi (2,227.26 km^{2})	25/sq mi (10/km^{2})
Total	373,792	361,921	+3.28%	2,282.219 sq mi (5,910.92 km^{2})	164/sq mi (63/km^{2})

== See also ==
- Nebraska census statistical areas
