= Norris School District 160 =

School district in Nebraska, United States

Coordinates: 40°33′52″N 96°37′54″W

School District #160 is a consolidated public school district located predominantly in Lancaster County but also extending into Gage County, Nebraska, United States. It serves a number of small communities including Roca, Hickman, Firth, Cortland, Panama, Princeton, Holland, Cheney, and Rokeby. The school district was founded on June 1, 1964, and was named in honor of Senator George William Norris, who represented the state of Nebraska in the United States Senate from 1913 to 1943. The school district currently enrolls just under 2000 students in grades K-12.

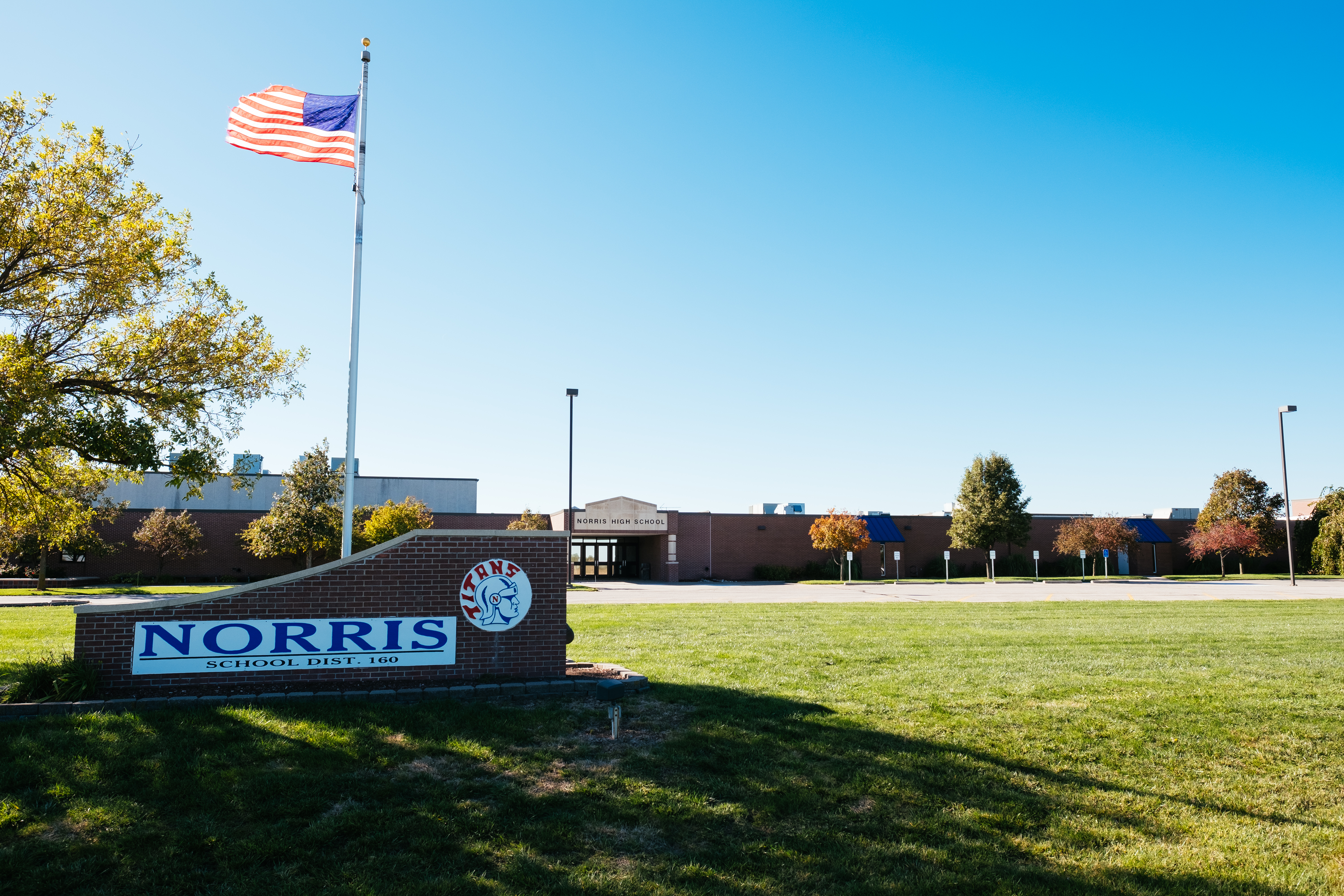
Norris High School

The main campus, which includes the four separate elementary (grades K-2), intermediate (grades 3-5), middle school (grades 6-8), and high school (grades 9-12) buildings, is located on 160 acres (0.65 km^{2}) of land, approximately 12 miles (19 km) south of Lincoln. The buildings are surrounded by the Norris Forest School Arboretum. In addition to the classroom facilities, the main campus includes the district's football and all—weather track complex, softball complex, cross country course, and bus barn.

The school is a member of the Eastern Midlands Athletic Conference, and competes at the Class B level in NSAA sanctioned events.

The school district was substantially damaged in the Hallam, Nebraska tornado outbreak of May 22, 2004. Reconstruction of the school took over 20 months to complete and cost over $35 million.

== Schools ==
- Norris High School
- Norris Middle School
- Norris Intermediate School
- Norris Elementary School

== Service area ==
Within Lancaster County, the district includes: Firth, Hickman, Panama, Princeton, and Roca, as well as small sections of Lincoln.

Within Gage County, the district includes Cortland.

Portions of the district extend into Otoe County.
