= Nebraska Highway 33 =

State highway in Nebraska, U.S.

State Highway 33

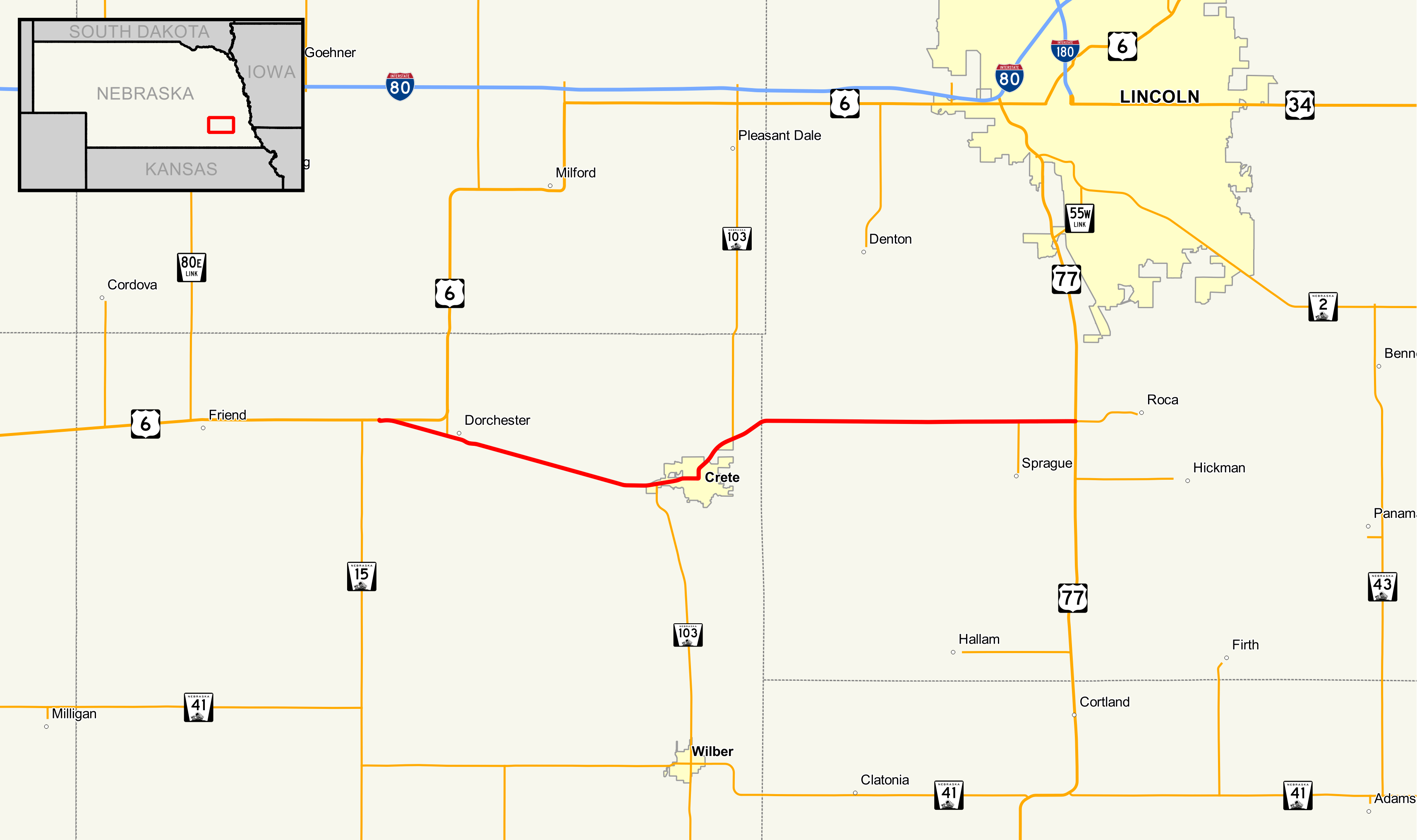
- Nebraska Highway 33 highlighted in red

Route information
- Maintained by NDOT
- Length: 25.56 mi (41.13 km)
- Existed: 1926–present

Major junctions
- West end: US 6 / N-15 west of Dorchester
- N-103 in Crete
- East end: US 77 west of Roca

Location
- Country: United States
- State: Nebraska
- Counties: Saline, Lancaster

Highway system
- Nebraska State Highway System; Interstate; US; State; Link; Spur; State Spurs; Recreation
← N-32	→ US 34

Nebraska Highway 33 is a highway in Nebraska. It runs for 26 miles (42 km) in southeastern Nebraska. It has a western terminus at U.S. Highway 6 and Nebraska Highway 15 west of Dorchester and an eastern terminus near Roca with U.S. Highway 77 and Nebraska Spur 55F.

== Route description ==
Nebraska Highway 33 begins west of Dorchester at U.S. Highway 6 and Nebraska Highway 15. It runs at a southeasterly angle parallel to BNSF railroad tracks through farmland. It passes through Dorchester, then continues southeast until an intersection with Nebraska Highway 103. NE 33 and NE 103 overlap through Crete and goes northeasterly. They separate northeast of Crete. Upon entering Lancaster County, the highway turns due east and ends near Roca at U.S. Highway 77 at an intersection about 10 miles (16 km) south of Lincoln. The eastern terminus of NE 33 is also the western terminus of Nebraska Spur 55F.

== Major intersections ==
County	Location	mi	km	Destinations	Notes
Saline	Dorchester	0.00	0.00	US 6 / N-15	
Saline	Dorchester	2.46	3.96	L-76E north (Westline Road)	
Saline	Crete	10.00	16.09	N-103 south	Western end of NE 103 overlap
Saline	Crete	13.44	21.63	N-103 north	Eastern end of NE 103 overlap
Lancaster	Sprague	23.58	37.95	S-55B south (SW 14th Street)	
Lancaster	Roca	25.56	41.13	US 77 (S. 12th Street) / S-55F east (Roca Road)	Interchange
1.000 mi = 1.609 km; 1.000 km = 0.621 mi: Concurrency terminus
