= Lancaster County, Nebraska =

County in Nebraska, United States

- County
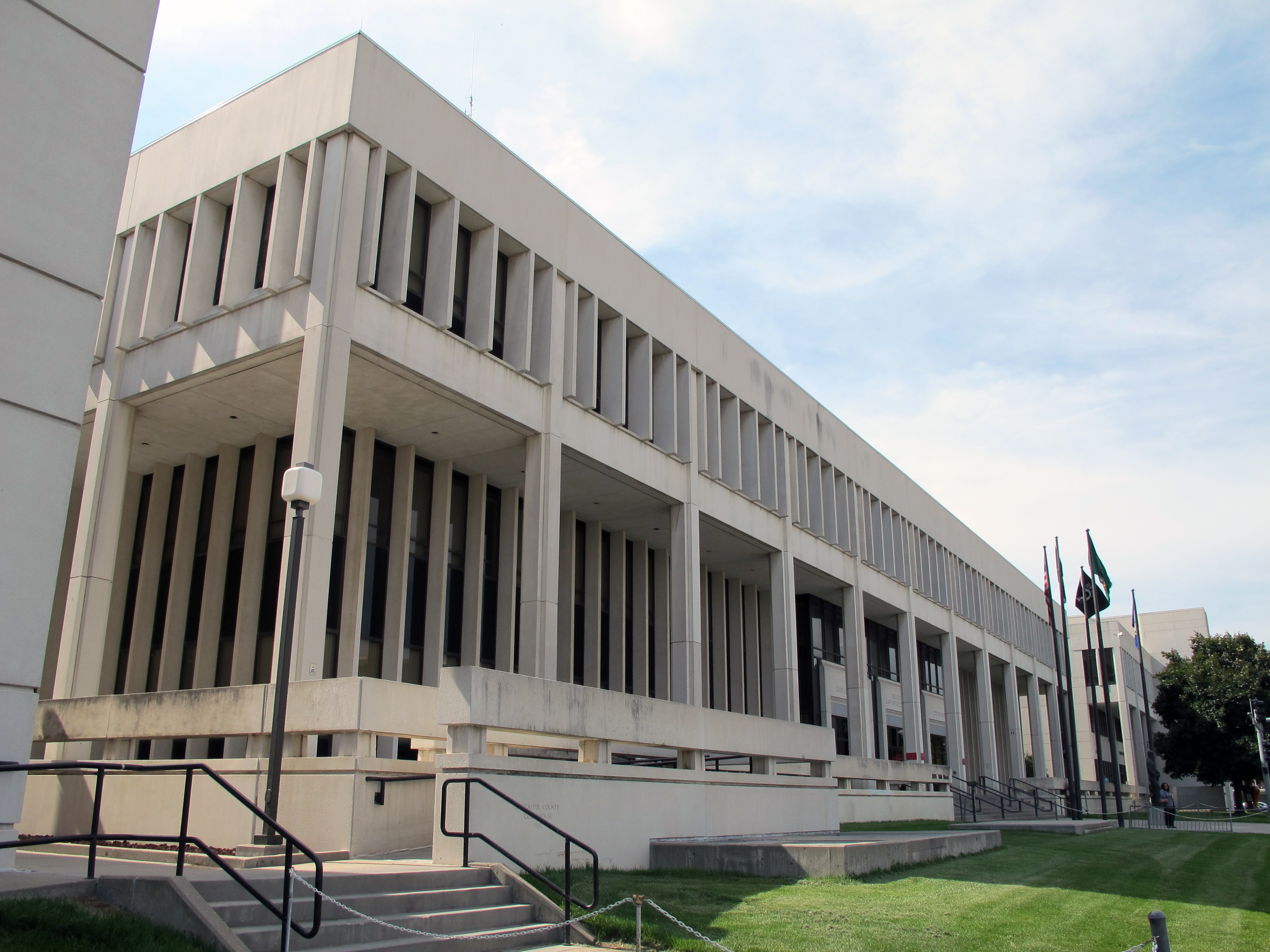
- Justice and Law Enforcement Center in Lincoln

- Flag Seal

- Location within the U.S. state of Nebraska
- Coordinates: 40.7835°N 96.6887°W
- Country: United States
- State: Nebraska
- Created: March 16, 1855
- Organized: October 10, 1859
- Named for: Lancaster, England
- Seat: Lincoln
- Largest city: Lincoln

Area
  - Total: 846.383 sq mi (2,192.12 km^{2})
  - Land: 837.560 sq mi (2,169.27 km^{2})
  - Water: 8.823 sq mi (22.85 km^{2}) 1.04%

Population (2020)
  - Total: 322,608
  - Estimate (2025): 334,049 ▲
  - Density: 385.176/sq mi (148.717/km^{2})
- Time zone: UTC−6 (Central)
  - Summer (DST): UTC−5 (CDT)
- Area code: 402 and 531
- Congressional district: 1st
- Website: lancaster.ne.gov
- • Nebraska county number 55 • Nebraska license plate prefix 02

Lancaster County is a county located in the U.S. state of Nebraska. As of the 2020 census, the population was 322,608, and was estimated to be 334,049 in 2025, making it the second-most populous county in Nebraska. The county seat and the largest city is Lincoln, the second-most populous city in Nebraska and the state capital. It is the 72nd-most populous city in the United States.

Lancaster County is part of the Lincoln, Nebraska metropolitan area.

In the Nebraska license plate system, Lancaster County was represented by the prefix "2" (as it had the second-largest number of vehicles registered in the state when the license plate system was established in 1922). In 2002, the state discontinued the 1922 system in the three most populous counties: Douglas, Lancaster, and Sarpy Counties.

== History ==
Lancaster County was created on March 16, 1855 and organized on October 10, 1859.

== Geography ==
According to the United States Census Bureau, the county has a total area of 846.383 square miles (2,192.12 km^{2}), of which 837.560 square miles (2,169.27 km^{2}) is land and 8.823 square miles (22.85 km^{2}) (1.04%) is water. It is the 26th-largest county in Nebraska by total area.

=== Major highways ===
- Interstate 80
- Interstate 180
- U.S. Highway 6
- U.S. Highway 34
- U.S. Highway 77
- Nebraska Highway 2
- Nebraska Highway 33
- Nebraska Highway 43
- Nebraska Highway 79

=== Transit ===
- Amtrak California Zephyr (Lincoln station)
- Burlington Trailways
- Express Arrow
- StarTran

=== Climate ===
In 2004, Lancaster County was named a StormReady county by the National Weather Service.

=== Adjacent counties ===
- Saunders County – north
- Cass County – northeast
- Otoe County – southeast
- Johnson County – southeast
- Gage County – south
- Saline County – southwest
- Seward County – northwest
- Butler County – northwest

=== Protected areas ===
- Bluestem Lake State Recreation Area
- Branched Oak State Recreation Area
- Conestoga Lake State Recreation Area
- Frank Shoemaker Marsh (part of Lincoln Parks & Recreation System)
- Holmes Lake Recreation Area
- Olive Creek Lake State Recreation Area
- Pawnee State Recreation Area
- Pioneers Park Nature Center
- Stagecoach Lake State Recreation Area
- Wagon Train Lake State Recreation Area
- Wildwood Lake State Wildlife Management Area
- Yankee Hill State Wildlife Management Area

== Demographics ==
Historical population
Census	Pop.	Note	%±
1860	153		—
1870	7,074		4,523.5%
1880	28,090		297.1%
1890	76,395		172.0%
1900	64,835		−15.1%
1910	73,793		13.8%
1920	85,902		16.4%
1930	100,324		16.8%
1940	100,585		0.3%
1950	119,742		19.0%
1960	155,272		29.7%
1970	167,972		8.2%
1980	192,884		14.8%
1990	213,641		10.8%
2000	250,291		17.2%
2010	285,407		14.0%
2020	322,608		13.0%
2025 (est.)	334,049	▲	3.5%
U.S. Decennial Census; 1790–1960 1900–1990; 1990–2000 2010–2020

As of the third quarter of 2025, the median home value in Lancaster County was $302,196.

As of the 2024 American Community Survey, there are 138,747 estimated households in Lancaster County with an average of 2.29 persons per household. The county has a median household income of $75,165. Approximately 12.6% of the county's population lives at or below the poverty line. Lancaster County has an estimated 67.0% employment rate, with 44.4% of the population holding a bachelor's degree or higher and 93.9% holding a high school diploma. There were 144,949 housing units at an average density of 173.06 per square mile (66.8/km^{2}).

The top five reported languages (people were allowed to report up to two languages, thus the figures will generally add to more than 100%) were English (87.0%), Spanish (5.2%), Indo-European (3.6%), Asian and Pacific Islander (3.2%), and Other (1.1%).

The median age in the county was 34.5 years.

Lancaster County, Nebraska – racial and ethnic composition Note: the US Census treats Hispanic/Latino as an ethnic category. This table excludes Latinos from the racial categories and assigns them to a separate category. Hispanics/Latinos may be of any race.
Race / ethnicity (NH = non-Hispanic)	Pop. 1980	Pop. 1990	Pop. 2000	Pop. 2010	Pop. 2020
White alone (NH)	183,254 (95.01%)	200,521 (93.86%)	222,067 (88.72%)	240,702 (84.34%)	251,962 (78.10%)
Black or African American alone (NH)	3,472 (1.80%)	4,583 (2.15%)	6,892 (2.75%)	9,636 (3.38%)	13,369 (4.14%)
Native American or Alaska Native alone (NH)	952 (0.49%)	1,090 (0.51%)	1,411 (0.56%)	1,674 (0.59%)	1,707 (0.53%)
Asian alone (NH)	1,723 (0.89%)	3,335 (1.56%)	7,118 (2.84%)	9,895 (3.47%)	13,975 (4.33%)
Pacific Islander alone (NH)	—	—	134 (0.05%)	131 (0.05%)	170 (0.05%)
Other race alone (NH)	604 (0.31%)	174 (0.08%)	352 (0.14%)	379 (0.13%)	1,351 (0.42%)
Mixed race or multiracial (NH)	—	—	3,880 (1.55%)	6,305 (2.21%)	14,230 (4.41%)
Hispanic or Latino (any race)	2,879 (1.49%)	3,938 (1.84%)	8,437 (3.37%)	16,685 (5.85%)	25,844 (8.01%)
Total	192,884 (100.00%)	213,641 (100.00%)	250,291 (100.00%)	285,407 (100.00%)	322,608 (100.00%)

=== 2024 estimate ===
As of the 2024 estimate, there were 332,857 people, 138,747 households, and _ families residing in the county. The population density was 397.41 inhabitants per square mile (153.4/km^{2}). There were 144,949 housing units at an average density of 173.06 per square mile (66.8/km^{2}). The racial makeup of the county was 85.2% White (77.7% NH White), 4.8% African American, 1.1% Native American, 5.2% Asian, 0.1% Pacific Islander, _% from some other races and 3.6% from two or more races. Hispanic or Latino people of any race were 9.0% of the population.

=== 2020 census ===
As of the 2020 census, there were 322,608 people, 127,884 households, and 76,042 families residing in the county. The population density was 385.18 inhabitants per square mile (148.7/km^{2}). There were 135,484 housing units at an average density of 161.76 per square mile (62.5/km^{2}). The racial makeup of the county was 80.11% White, 4.26% African American, 0.83% Native American, 4.37% Asian, 0.06% Pacific Islander, 3.24% from some other races and 7.13% from two or more races. Hispanic or Latino people of any race were 8.01% of the population.

The median age was 34.7 years. 22.9% of residents were under the age of 18 and 14.6% of residents were 65 years of age or older. For every 100 females there were 100.6 males, and for every 100 females age 18 and over there were 99.3 males age 18 and over.

90.3% of residents lived in urban areas, while 9.7% lived in rural areas.

There were 127,884 households in the county, of which 29.0% had children under the age of 18 living with them and 26.8% had a female householder with no spouse or partner present. About 31.3% of all households were made up of individuals and 10.6% had someone living alone who was 65 years of age or older.

There were 135,484 housing units, of which 5.6% were vacant. Among occupied housing units, 59.2% were owner-occupied and 40.8% were renter-occupied. The homeowner vacancy rate was 1.0% and the rental vacancy rate was 7.0%.

=== 2010 census ===
As of the 2010 census, there were 285,407 people, 113,373 households, and 69,309 families residing in the county. The population density was 340.76 inhabitants per square mile (131.6/km^{2}). There were 120,875 housing units at an average density of 144.32 per square mile (55.7/km^{2}). The racial makeup of the county was 87.11% White, 3.48% African American, 0.75% Native American, 3.49% Asian, 0.05% Pacific Islander, 2.36% from some other races and 2.76% from two or more races. Hispanic or Latino people of any race were 5.85% of the population.

=== 2000 census ===
As of the 2000 census, there were 250,291 people, 99,187 households, and 60,702 families residing in the county. The population density was 298.83 inhabitants per square mile (115.4/km^{2}). There were 104,217 housing units at an average density of 124.43 per square mile (48.0/km^{2}). The racial makeup of the county was 90.07% White, 2.82% African American, 0.64% Native American, 2.86% Asian, 0.06% Pacific Islander, 1.69% from some other races and 1.87% from two or more races. Hispanic or Latino people of any race were 3.37% of the population. 39.1% were of German, 7.9% English and 7.8% Irish ancestry.

There were 99,187 households, out of which 30.30% had children under the age of 18 living with them, 48.80% were married couples living together, 9.10% had a female householder with no husband present, and 38.80% were non-families. 29.10% of all households were made up of individuals, and 8.30% had someone living alone who was 65 years of age or older. The average household size was 2.40 and the average family size was 3.00.

The county population contained 23.50% under the age of 18, 15.40% from 18 to 24, 30.40% from 25 to 44, 20.30% from 45 to 64, and 10.40% who were 65 years of age or older. The median age was 32 years. For every 100 females, there were 99.80 males. For every 100 females age 18 and over, there were 98.50 males.

The median income for a household in the county was $41,850, and the median income for a family was $53,676. Males had a median income of $34,720 versus $25,614 for females. The per capita income for the county was $21,265. About 5.50% of families and 9.50% of the population were below the poverty line, including 9.90% of those under age 18 and 6.10% of those age 65 or over.

== Communities ==
=== Cities ===
- Bennet
- Hickman
- Lincoln (county seat)
- Waverly

=== Villages ===
- Davey
- Denton
- Firth
- Hallam
- Malcolm
- Panama
- Raymond
- Roca
- Sprague

=== Census-designated places ===
- Agnew
- Cheney
- Emerald
- Kramer
- Martell
- Prairie Home
- Princeton
- Walton
- Yankee Hill

=== Other unincorporated communities ===
- Arbor
- Berks
- Holland
- Rokeby
- Saltillo

=== Census divisions ===
Lancaster County is divided into the following census divisions called precincts, defined by the boundaries of the original townships,

- Buda
- Centerville
- Denton
- Elk
- Garfield
- Grant
- Highlands
- Lancaster
- Little Salt
- Middle Creek
- Mill
- Nemaha
- North Bluff
- Oak
- Olive Branch
- Panama
- Rock Creek
- Saltillo
- South Pass
- Stevens Creek
- Stockton
- Waverly
- West Lincoln
- West Oak
- Yankee Hill

== Politics ==
Lancaster County has historically been somewhat conservative for an urban county. In the last 30 national elections, Lancaster County selected the Republican Party candidate 78% of the time. However, it has become more competitive in recent years, largely due to the influence of Lincoln and the University of Nebraska. Since 1988, the margin in the county has been 10 points or less all but once. In 2008, Barack Obama won a narrow majority in Lancaster County, becoming the first Democrat to carry the county since 1964, and only the second since 1936. Republican Donald Trump never won the county in any of his three runs.

Political Party	Number of registered voters (April 1, 2026)	Percent
Republican	83,119	40.10%
Democratic	68,251	32.93%
Independent	50,845	24.53%
Libertarian	3,208	1.55%
Legal Marijuana Now	1,858	0.90%
Total	207,281	100.00%

United States presidential election results for Lancaster County, Nebraska
Year	Republican		Democratic		Third party(ies)	
Year	No.	%	No.	%	No.	%
1880	3,397	69.50%	1,381	28.25%	110	2.25%
1884	4,011	62.69%	2,180	34.07%	207	3.24%
1888	5,677	56.97%	3,508	35.20%	780	7.83%
1892	5,858	52.69%	1,283	11.54%	3,977	35.77%
1896	6,513	52.17%	5,687	45.55%	284	2.27%
1900	7,465	55.27%	5,677	42.03%	365	2.70%
1904	8,167	70.77%	1,981	17.16%	1,393	12.07%
1908	7,428	45.15%	8,540	51.91%	485	2.95%
1912	2,566	18.16%	6,708	47.47%	4,857	34.37%
1916	7,042	42.20%	9,093	54.49%	553	3.31%
1920	15,638	62.58%	8,435	33.75%	917	3.67%
1924	18,061	54.40%	11,563	34.83%	3,575	10.77%
1928	30,523	75.17%	9,840	24.23%	242	0.60%
1932	20,772	52.29%	18,190	45.79%	761	1.92%
1936	20,902	47.39%	22,366	50.71%	838	1.90%
1940	27,384	58.63%	19,321	41.37%	0	0.00%
1944	26,715	58.01%	19,338	41.99%	0	0.00%
1948	23,620	56.29%	18,338	43.71%	0	0.00%
1952	36,797	67.49%	17,728	32.51%	0	0.00%
1956	35,591	64.94%	19,217	35.06%	0	0.00%
1960	37,725	62.57%	22,564	37.43%	0	0.00%
1964	23,887	40.91%	34,503	59.09%	0	0.00%
1968	33,051	55.52%	23,539	39.54%	2,940	4.94%
1972	42,573	62.15%	25,924	37.85%	0	0.00%
1976	39,041	56.47%	28,301	40.94%	1,789	2.59%
1980	38,780	50.87%	27,162	35.63%	10,291	13.50%
1984	48,778	59.31%	32,898	40.00%	569	0.69%
1988	44,744	49.87%	44,396	49.48%	583	0.65%
1992	41,590	39.46%	41,402	39.28%	22,407	21.26%
1996	44,812	45.86%	43,339	44.36%	9,557	9.78%
2000	55,514	51.82%	44,650	41.68%	6,968	6.50%
2004	69,764	56.03%	52,747	42.36%	1,998	1.60%
2008	59,398	46.59%	65,734	51.56%	2,358	1.85%
2012	62,434	49.02%	62,015	48.69%	2,906	2.28%
2016	61,588	45.21%	61,898	45.44%	12,737	9.35%
2020	70,092	44.58%	82,293	52.34%	4,830	3.07%
2024	74,215	46.75%	81,012	51.04%	3,507	2.21%

== Representatives ==
- Roma Amundson, District 4 Commissioner, retired U.S. Brigadier General

== Education ==
School districts include:

- Crete Public Schools #2, Crete
- Freeman Public Schools #34, Adams
- Lincoln Public Schools #1, Lincoln
- Malcolm Public Schools #148, Malcolm
- Milford Public Schools #5, Milford
- Norris School District #160, Firth
- Palmyra District OR-1 #501, Palmyra
- Raymond Central Public Schools #161, Raymond
- Waverly School District #145, Waverly
- Wilber-Clatonia Public Schools #82, Wilber

== See also ==
- National Register of Historic Places listings in Lancaster County, Nebraska

== Notable native ==
- Leon Riley (1906–1970), American minor league baseball player/manager (born in Princeton, Nebraska).
