= Bennet, Nebraska =

Village in Lancaster County, Nebraska, United States

- City
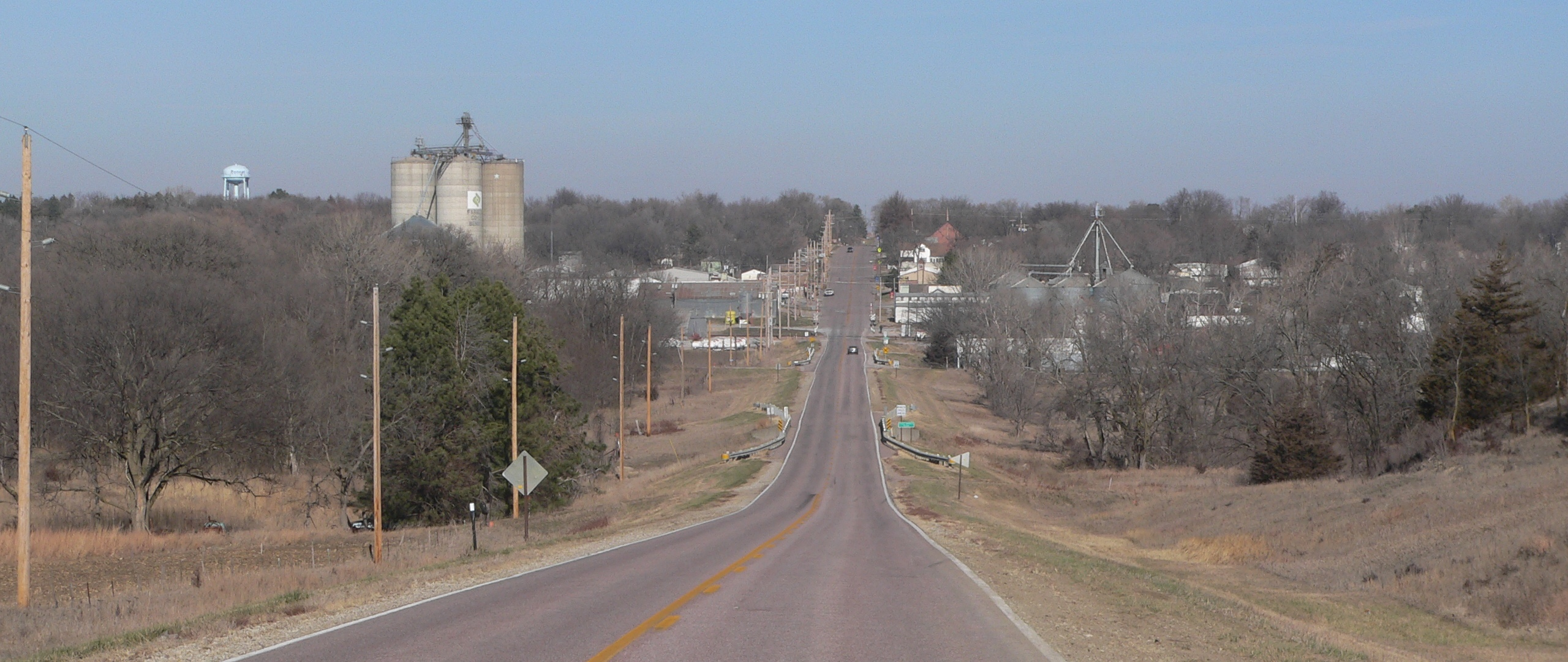
- Bennet, seen from the south along Nebraska Highway 43

- Location of Bennet, Nebraska
- Coordinates: 40°40′54″N 96°30′14″W
- Country: United States
- State: Nebraska
- County: Lancaster
- Founded: July 29, 1871
- Incorporated: October 1, 1881

Government
  - Mayor: Ryan Cheney
  - Councilmembers: Ward 1A: Pete Simmons; Ward 1B: Joshua Buck; Ward 2A: Daniel Zieg; Ward 2B: Jesse Schmidt
  - Village Clerk/Treasurer: Sue Biltoft

Area
  - Total: 0.519 sq mi (1.343 km^{2})
  - Land: 0.519 sq mi (1.343 km^{2})
  - Water: 0 sq mi (0.000 km^{2})
- Elevation: 1,299 ft (396 m)

Population (2020)
  - Total: 1,082
  - Estimate (2023): 1,080
  - Density: 2,083/sq mi (804.3/km^{2})
- Time zone: UTC−6 (Central (CST))
  - Summer (DST): UTC−5 (CDT)
- ZIP Code: 68317
- Area codes: 402 and 531
- FIPS code: 31-04300
- GNIS feature ID: 2398094
- Sales tax: 6.5%
- Website: villageofbennet.com

Bennet is a city in Lancaster County, Nebraska, United States. It is part of the Lincoln, Nebraska Metropolitan Statistical Area. The population was 1,082 at the 2020 census.

== History ==
Bennet was founded on July 29, 1871 when the railroad was extended to that point. The village was founded on land previously owned by William Roggenkamp as a station for a rail line being laid by the Midland Pacific Railway which ran from Lincoln to Nebraska City. It was originally named Bennett's Station for John Bennett, officer of the Midland Pacific Railway. The town was incorporated on October 1, 1881.

By the early 1900s, the village had become a prosperous commercial and social center for the area. At this time, the nearby town of Lincoln was still relatively small and remote. Beginning with the Great Depression, Bennet's population declined, local businesses closed, and many moved to cities for work.

Today, Bennet has a similar status as many former business centers in Lancaster County as Lincoln has become the political, financial, commercial, and cultural center of the county. However, Bennet has experienced a recent population growth as more and more people have begun living in Bennet despite working in Lincoln. According to a community-wide survey conducted in 1992, 76% of Bennet's residents commute to work in Lincoln. A recent survey indicated that 44% of people who moved to Bennet did so because of the small town atmosphere, citing a lower cost of living, cleaner air, and a good school system.

On April 21, 2024, a 17-year-old boy derailed a BNSF Railway train in Bennet. He was charged in Lancaster County court three months later with two felony counts of criminal mischief and property damage, later being sentenced to five years of probation.

== Geography ==
According to the United States Census Bureau, the village has a total area of 0.518 square miles (1.34 km^{2}), all land.

== Demographics ==
Historical population
Census	Pop.	Note	%±
1880	214		—
1890	474		121.5%
1900	495		4.4%
1910	457		−7.7%
1920	473		3.5%
1930	428		−9.5%
1940	412		−3.7%
1950	396		−3.9%
1960	381		−3.8%
1970	489		28.3%
1980	523		7.0%
1990	544		4.0%
2000	570		4.8%
2010	719		26.1%
2020	1,082		50.5%
2023 (est.)	1,080	▼	−0.2%
U.S. Decennial Census; 2020 Census

=== 2020 census ===
Bennet, Nebraska – Racial Composition (NH = Non-Hispanic) Note: the US Census treats Hispanic/Latino as an ethnic category. This table excludes Latinos from the racial categories and assigns them to a separate category. Hispanics/Latinos can be of any race.
Race	Number	Percentage
White (NH)	984	90.9%
Black or African American (NH)	4	0.4%
Native American or Alaska Native (NH)	0	0.0%
Asian (NH)	2	0.2%
Pacific Islander (NH)	1	0.1%
Some Other Race (NH)	3	0.3%
Mixed/Multi-Racial (NH)	50	4.6%
Hispanic or Latino	38	3.5%
Total	1,082	100.0%

As of the 2020 census, there were 1,082 people, 379 households, 287 families residing in the village. The population density was 2,076.8 inhabitants per square mile (801.9/km^{2}). There were 395 housing units. The racial makeup of the village was 92.6% White, 0.4% African American, 0.0% Native American, 0.2% Asian, 0.1% Pacific Islander, 0.4% from some other races and 6.4% from two or more races. Hispanic or Latino of any race were 3.5% of the population.

=== 2010 census ===
As of the 2010 census, there were 719 people, 286 households, and 199 families living in the village. The population density was 1,409.8 inhabitants per square mile (544.3/km^{2}). There were 306 housing units at an average density of 600.0 units per square mile (231.7 units/km^{2}). The racial makeup of the village was 98.9% White, 0.1% Asian, and 1.0% from two or more races. Hispanic or Latino of any race were 0.3% of the population.

There were 286 households, of which 36.4% had children under the age of 18 living with them, 57.0% were married couples living together, 8.4% had a female householder with no husband present, 4.2% had a male householder with no wife present, and 30.4% were non-families. 22.4% of all households were made up of individuals, and 8% had someone living alone who was 65 years of age or older. The average household size was 2.51 and the average family size was 2.99.

The median age in the village was 32.9 years. 26.6% of residents were under the age of 18; 7.5% were between the ages of 18 and 24; 33.7% were from 25 to 44; 20.7% were from 45 to 64; and 11.5% were 65 years of age or older. The gender makeup of the village was 52.9% male and 47.1% female.

=== 2000 census ===
As of the 2000 census, there were 570 people, 222 households, and 174 families living in the village. The population density was 1,339.7 inhabitants per square mile (517.3/km^{2}). There were 231 housing units at an average density of 542.9 units per square mile (209.6 units/km^{2}). The racial makeup of the village was 98.25% White, 0.18% African American, 0.18% Asian, 0.35% from other races, and 1.05% from two or more races. Hispanic or Latino of any race were 0.70% of the population.

There were 222 households, out of which 37.8% had children under the age of 18 living with them, 66.2% were married couples living together, 8.6% had a female householder with no husband present, and 21.2% were non-families. 19.4% of all households were made up of individuals, and 8.6% had someone living alone who was 65 years of age or older. The average household size was 2.57 and the average family size was 2.91.

In the village, the population was spread out, with 28.8% under the age of 18, 4.2% from 18 to 24, 31.9% from 25 to 44, 22.1% from 45 to 64, and 13.0% who were 65 years of age or older. The median age was 37 years. For every 100 females, there were 109.6 males. For every 100 females age 18 and over, there were 101.0 males.

As of 2000 the median income for a household in the village was $42,237, and the median income for a family was $46,250. Males had a median income of $32,045 versus $21,176 for females. The per capita income for the village was $17,280. About 2.8% of families and 3.5% of the population were below the poverty line, including 3.1% of those under age 18 and 12.2% of those age 65 or over.

== See also ==
- List of municipalities in Nebraska
