= Davey, Nebraska =

- Village
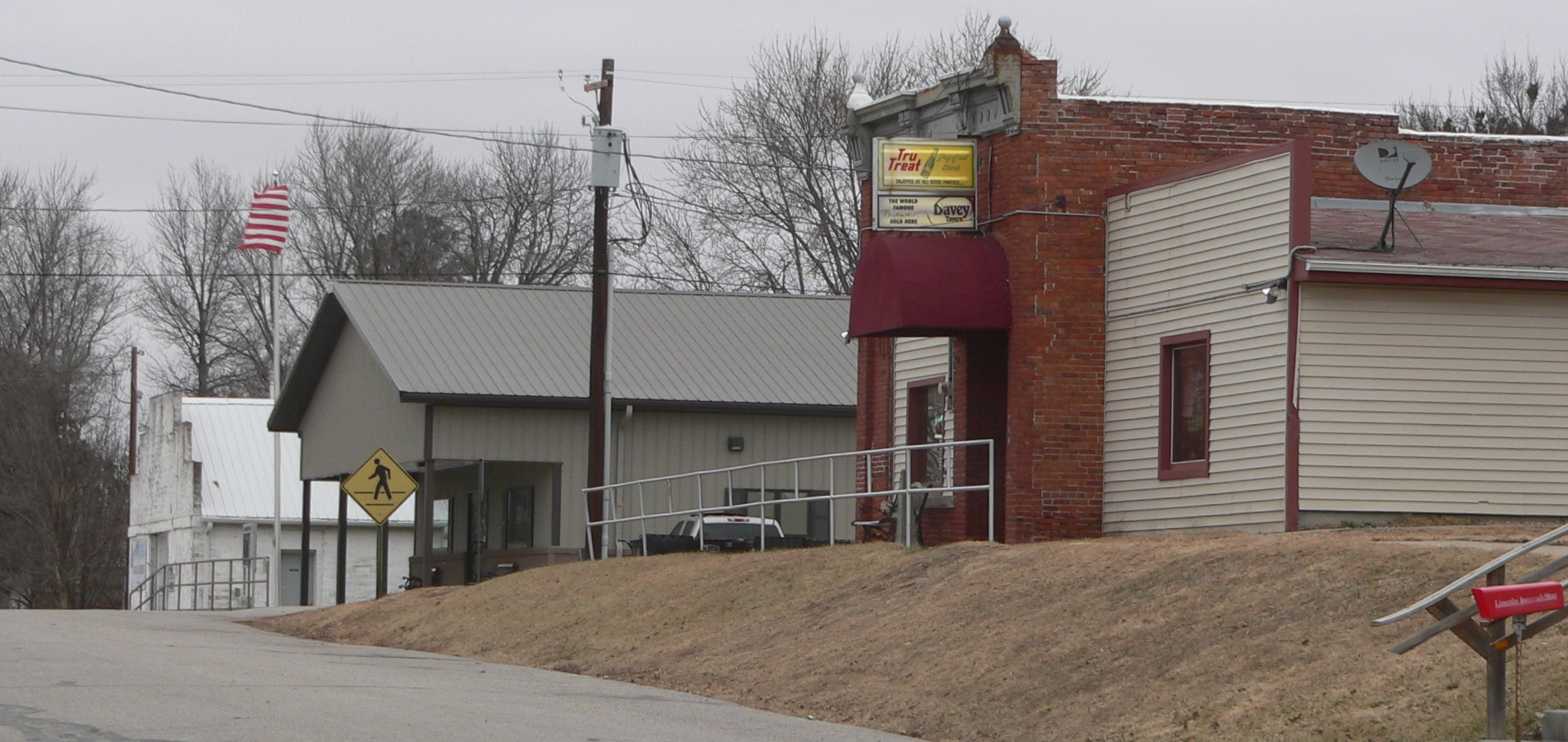
- Downtown Davey: east side of 2nd Street

- Location of Davey, Nebraska
- Coordinates: 40°59′02″N 96°40′09″W
- Country: United States
- State: Nebraska
- County: Lancaster

Area
  - Total: 0.15 sq mi (0.40 km^{2})
  - Land: 0.15 sq mi (0.40 km^{2})
  - Water: 0 sq mi (0.00 km^{2})
- Elevation: 1,296 ft (395 m)

Population (2020)
  - Total: 135
  - Density: 873.9/sq mi (337.43/km^{2})
- Time zone: UTC-6 (Central (CST))
  - Summer (DST): UTC-5 (CDT)
- ZIP code: 68336
- Area code: 402
- FIPS code: 31-12280
- GNIS feature ID: 2398686
- Website: lancaster.ne.gov/davey

Davey is a village in Lancaster County, Nebraska, United States. It is part of the Lincoln, Nebraska Metropolitan Statistical Area. The population was 135 at the 2020 census.

== History ==
Irish immigrants were the first Europeans to settle northern Lancaster county, followed by other Northern European immigrants such as Danes and Swedes with the passage of the Homestead Act in 1862. The area was originally known as Rock Creek and was served by a Pony Express station in 1871. In 1875, a Danish Lutheran church was built in the area. The town of Davey was founded in the Rock Creek area in 1886 when the Fremont, Elkhorn and Missouri Valley Railroad was extended to that point and was named for Michael Davey, a pioneer citizen.

By 1891, Davey offered a livery barn, an ice house, a meat market, a barber shop, a two-story opera house, a doctor's office, and a confectioner's shop. In 1900, the Interstate Company of Lincoln began publishing the Davey Mirror, the village newspaper. In 1903, the Farmers State Bank of Davey opened its doors in the center of the village.

A fire broke out at the local Catholic church in 1919 which spread throughout the town, burning many buildings including the Farmers State Bank of Davey and the telephone office. The Davey Hall, a WPA project, was built in the 1930s and celebrated by two days of festivities. The only grocery store in Davey, Hansen's Grocery, closed in 1965 and the last Chicago Northwestern train passed through the village in 1981. Today, the train tracks have been converted to a hiking trail.

== Geography ==
According to the United States Census Bureau, the village has a total area of 0.15 square miles (0.39 km^{2}), all land.

== Demographics ==
Historical population
Census	Pop.	Note	%±
1920	123		—
1930	154		25.2%
1940	125		−18.8%
1950	112		−10.4%
1960	121		8.0%
1970	163		34.7%
1980	190		16.6%
1990	160		−15.8%
2000	153		−4.4%
2010	154		0.7%
2020	135		−12.3%
U.S. Decennial Census; 2012 Estimate

=== 2010 census ===
At the 2010 census, of 2010, there were 154 people, 61 households and 40 families residing in the village. The population density was 1,026.7 inhabitants per square mile (396.4/km^{2}). There were 66 housing units at an average density of 440.0 units per square mile (169.9 units/km^{2}). The racial makeup of the village was 96.8% White, 0.6% Pacific Islander, 0.6% from other races, and 1.9% from two or more races. Hispanic or Latino of any race were 1.3% of the population.

There were 61 households, of which 26.2% had children under the age of 18 living with them, 54.1% were married couples living together, 6.6% had a female householder with no husband present, 4.9% had a male householder with no wife present, and 34.4% were non-families. 24.6% of all households were made up of individuals, and 8.2% had someone living alone who was 65 years of age or older. The average household size was 2.52 and the average family size was 3.18.

The median age was 39.6 years. 26% of residents were under the age of 18; 6.4% were between the ages of 18 and 24; 25.3% were from 25 to 44; 26.6% were from 45 to 64; and 15.6% were 65 years of age or older. The gender makeup of the village was 54.5% male and 45.5% female.

=== 2000 census ===
At the 2000 census, there were 153 people, 67 households and 44 families residing in the village. The population density was 987.9 inhabitants per square mile (381.4/km^{2}). There were 69 housing units at an average density of 445.5 units per square mile (172.0 units/km^{2}). The racial makeup of the village was 98.04% White, 1.31% from other races, and 0.65% from two or more races. Hispanic or Latino of any race were 1.31% of the population.

There were 67 households, of which 29.9% had children under the age of 18 living with them, 64.2% were married couples living together, 1.5% had a female householder with no husband present, and 34.3% were non-families. 31.3% of all households were made up of individuals, and 9.0% had someone living alone who was 65 years of age or older. The average household size was 2.28 and the average family size was 2.89.

20.9% of the population were under the age of 18, 5.2% from 18 to 24, 35.3% from 25 to 44, 20.9% from 45 to 64, and 17.6% who were 65 years of age or older. The median age was 38 years. For every 100 females, there were 109.6 males. For every 100 females age 18 and over, there were 101.7 males.

The median household income was $37,500 and the median family income was $52,083. Males had a median income of $30,625 compared with $19,375 for females. The per capita income for the village was $21,128. None of the families and 0.7% of the population were living below the poverty line, including no under eighteens and 5.6% of those over 64.
