= Raymond, Nebraska =

- Village
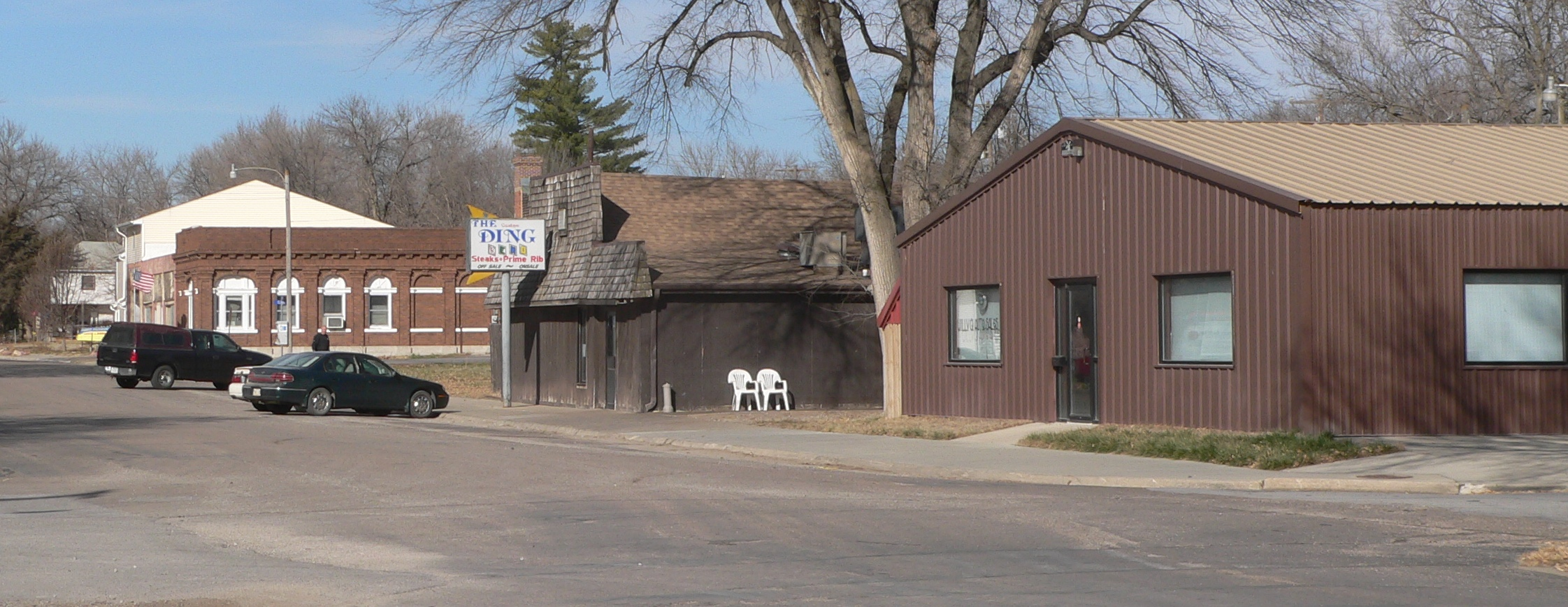
- First Street in Raymond

- Location of Raymond, Nebraska
- Coordinates: 40°57′25″N 96°46′53″W
- Country: United States
- State: Nebraska
- County: Lancaster

Area
  - Total: 0.13 sq mi (0.34 km^{2})
  - Land: 0.13 sq mi (0.34 km^{2})
  - Water: 0 sq mi (0.00 km^{2})
- Elevation: 1,240 ft (380 m)

Population (2020)
  - Total: 159
  - Density: 1,209.1/sq mi (466.85/km^{2})
- Time zone: UTC-6 (Central (CST))
  - Summer (DST): UTC-5 (CDT)
- ZIP code: 68428
- Area code: 402
- FIPS code: 31-40780
- GNIS feature ID: 2399050
- Website: http://lancaster.ne.gov/raymond/

Raymond is a village in Lancaster County, Nebraska, United States. It is part of the Lincoln, Nebraska Metropolitan Statistical Area. The population was 159 at the 2020 census.

== History ==
Beginning in 1864, settlers arrived in the area and a subscription school was run in the home of Charles and Olive White. In 1870, Oak Creek was dammed and a grist mill was erected. A population grew in the area, generally centered around Raymond's present location, but there was no official settlement or name of the area. In 1878, a post office was established nearby and named "Orlando." Raymond was platted in 1880 when the railroad was extended to that point and was named for I. M. Raymond, a railroad official.

In 1892, Raymond became incorporated as a village and one year later a two-room school was built. Following consolidation with several neighboring school districts, a new high school was built near Agnew, Nebraska, but elementary school students still attend school in Raymond.

The twentieth century created challenges for Raymond. As automobiles became the way to travel cross-country in the United States, Raymond was left disconnected as Highway 79 passed one half mile west of the town rather than through it. World War II saw the building of the Lincoln Air Base and increasing numbers of factory jobs elsewhere, leaving Raymond behind.

However, Raymond experienced a period of growth following the construction of Branched Oak Dam in 1970. The dam provided flood relief for the village, but also created a large reservoir surrounded by the largest recreational area in eastern Nebraska.

== Geography ==
According to the United States Census Bureau, the village has a total area of 0.13 square miles (0.34 km^{2}), all land.

== Demographics ==
Historical population
Census	Pop.	Note	%±
1900	200		—
1910	236		18.0%
1920	249		5.5%
1930	205		−17.7%
1940	199		−2.9%
1950	196		−1.5%
1960	223		13.8%
1970	187		−16.1%
1980	179		−4.3%
1990	167		−6.7%
2000	186		11.4%
2010	167		−10.2%
2020	159		−4.8%
U.S. Decennial Census

=== 2010 census ===
As of the census of 2010, there were 167 people, 71 households, and 45 families residing in the village. The population density was 1,284.6 inhabitants per square mile (496.0/km^{2}). There were 76 housing units at an average density of 584.6 units per square mile (225.7 units/km^{2}). The racial makeup of the village was 95.8% White, 0.6% African American, 1.2% Asian, and 2.4% from two or more races.

There were 71 households, of which 28.2% had children under the age of 18 living with them, 54.9% were married couples living together, 4.2% had a female householder with no husband present, 4.2% had a male householder with no wife present, and 36.6% were non-families. 28.2% of all households were made up of individuals, and 11.2% had someone living alone who was 65 years of age or older. The average household size was 2.35 and the average family size was 2.93.

The median age in the village was 45.2 years. 21.6% of residents were under the age of 18; 7.2% were between the ages of 18 and 24; 21% were from 25 to 44; 42% were from 45 to 64; and 8.4% were 65 years of age or older. The gender makeup of the village was 54.5% male and 45.5% female.

=== 2000 census ===
As of the census of 2000, there were 186 people, 73 households, and 51 families residing in the village. The population density was 1,450.0 inhabitants per square mile (559.8/km^{2}). There were 75 housing units at an average density of 584.7 units per square mile (225.8 units/km^{2}). The racial makeup of the village was 97.85% White, 0.54% African American, and 1.61% from two or more races.

There were 73 households, out of which 39.7% had children under the age of 18 living with them, 58.9% were married couples living together, 8.2% had a female householder with no husband present, and 28.8% were non-families. 26.0% of all households were made up of individuals, and 11.0% had someone living alone who was 65 years of age or older. The average household size was 2.55 and the average family size was 3.04.

In the village, the population was spread out, with 28.5% under the age of 18, 8.6% from 18 to 24, 32.8% from 25 to 44, 21.5% from 45 to 64, and 8.6% who were 65 years of age or older. The median age was 36 years. For every 100 females, there were 97.9 males. For every 100 females age 18 and over, there were 104.6 males.

As of 2000 the median income for a household in the village was $53,750, and the median income for a family was $57,188. Males had a median income of $41,250 versus $24,083 for females. The per capita income for the village was $21,672. None of the families and 2.9% of the population were living below the poverty line, including no under eighteens and 14.3% of those over 64.

== See also ==
- List of municipalities in Nebraska
