= Roma Amundson =

American brigadier general

Roma Amundson (born April 7, 1950) is a retired U.S. Brigadier General and retired Assistant Adjutant General-Army for the Nebraska National Guard in Lincoln, Nebraska.

A Republican, Amundson is currently a 3rd-term Lancaster County, Nebraska District 4 Commissioner representing Southeast Lancaster County, Nebraska.

== Early life, family, education and personal life ==
Amundson was born on April 7, 1950, in northeast Nebraska. In 1972, Amundson graduated from the University of Nebraska–Lincoln with a Bachelor of Arts in Secondary Education with Distinction. In 1975, Amundson attended the Goethe-Institut for Language Studies in Freiburg in Breisgau, West Germany. In 1977, she earned a Master of Science in Education from the University of Nebraska–Lincoln. From 1972 to 1982, Amundson worked in education. From 1982 to 1996, she worked as a Financial Services Agent.

Since 1996, Amundson has worked as a residential realtor in Lancaster County, Nebraska, and the greater Lincoln, Nebraska, area. Amundson is active with the Girl Scouts of the United States.

She is married to Randy Amundson. They have two grown children, Justin Amundson and Dawn Amundson.

== Military career ==
On May 30, 1980, Amundson graduated from the Nebraska State Officer Candidate School program at Camp Ashland in Ashland, Nebraska. On June 11, 1980, she received her commission as a 2nd Lieutenant. In 1998, Amundson attended United States Army War College in Carlisle Barracks, Pennsylvania. In 2002, she completed the Reserve Component Multifunctional Combat Service Support Course at Fort Lee, Virginia. Amundson has also completed the Combat Service Support Pre-Command Course at Fort Lee, Virginia, in 2004 and the Senior Manager Course in National Security in 2007. Amundson’s detachment, battalion, and brigade commands have included the 67th Signal Detachment, the 67th Infantry Brigade (M), the Selective Service Detachment (NE STARC), the 2nd Battalion, the 209th Regional Training Institute, and the 92nd Troop Command.

In 2008, Amundson was named the Nebraska Military Department Woman of the Year.

On June 1, 2009, Amundson was promoted to Brigadier General.

On July 17, 2009, Amundson was appointed the Assistant Adjutant General for the Nebraska Army National Guard. In her role, she advised the Adjutant General on education, training, and utilization issues.

In April 2011, Amundson retired as a Brigadier General from the Nebraska National Guard after 33 years of service.

== Assignments ==
- June 1980 - April 1982, Platoon Leader, Headquarters and Headquarters Company, 67th Infantry Brigade (Mechanized), Lincoln, Nebraska
- April 1982 - February 1984, Detachment Commander, 67th Signal Detachment, Lincoln, Nebraska
- February 1984 - May 1985, Assistant Communications-Electronics Officer, Headquarters, State Area Command, Lincoln, Nebraska
- May 1985 - December 1985, Executive Officer, Company A, 135th Signal Battalion, Omaha, Nebraska
- December 1985 - October 1989, Selective Service Officer, Headquarters, State Area Command, Lincoln, Nebraska
- October 1989 - October 1993, Assistant Director Selective Service, Detachment 1, Headquarters, State Area Command, Lincoln, Nebraska
- October 1993 - November 1996, Director of Information Management, Headquarters, State Area Command, Lincoln, Nebraska
- November 1996 - June 1999, Defense Movement Coordinator, Headquarters, State Area Command, Lincoln, Nebraska
- June 1999 - August 1999, Assistant Director of Personnel Affairs, Headquarters, State Area Command, Lincoln, Nebraska
- August 1999 - April 2001, Commander, 2nd Battalion, 209th Regional Training Institute (General Studies)/Executive Officer, 209th Regional Training Institute (General Studies), Camp Ashland, Nebraska
- April 2001 - April 2003, Director of Facilities and Engineering, Headquarters, State Area Command, Lincoln, Nebraska
- April 2003 - July 2003, Director of Maintenance, Headquarters, State Area Command, Lincoln, Nebraska
- July 2003 - June 2004, Director of Logistics, Headquarters, State Area Command, Lincoln, Nebraska
- June 2004 - April 2008, Commander, 92nd Troop Command, Lincoln, Nebraska
- April 2008 - December 2008, Deputy Chief of Staff for Operations, Joint Forces Headquarters, Lincoln, Nebraska
- December 2008 - Jun 2009, Commander, Land Component, Nebraska National Guard, Lincoln, Nebraska
- July 2009 – Present, Assistant Adjutant General - Army, Nebraska National Guard, Lincoln, Nebraska

== Awards and commendations ==
- Meritorious Service Medal (with 1 Bronze Oak Leaf Cluster)
- Army Commendation Medal
- Army Achievement Medal (with 1 Bronze Oak Leaf Cluster)
- Selective Service Meritorious Service Medal
- Army Reserve Components Achievement Medal (with 1 Silver Oak Leaf Cluster and 3 Bronze Oak Leaf Clusters)
- National Defense Service Medal (with 1 Bronze Service Star)
- Humanitarian Service Medal
- Armed Forces Reserve Medal (with 1 Gold Hourglass Device)
- Army Service Ribbon
- Nebraska National Guard Individual Achievement Medal (with 2 Bronze Oak Leaf Cluster)
- Nebraska National Guard Emergency Service Medal
- Nebraska National Guard Service Medal (with 30 Year Device)
- Driver and Mechanic Badge

== Political career ==
In 2012, Amundson was elected as the Lancaster County, Nebraska District 4 Commissioner representing Southeast Lancaster County. A Republican, she was reelected in 2016 and 2020. Her 3rd term ends in 2025.
