= Leon Riley =

American baseball player (1906-1970)

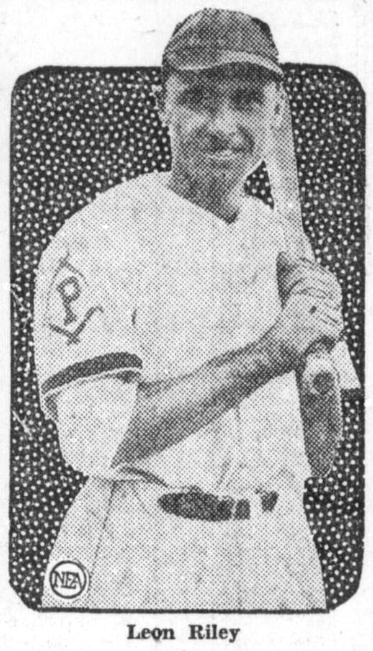
- Riley in 1928
- Outfielder
- Born: August 20, 1906; Princeton, Nebraska, U.S.
- Died: September 13, 1970 (aged 64); Schenectady, New York, U.S.
- Batted: Left Threw: Right

MLB debut
- April 19, 1944, for the Philadelphia Phillies

Last MLB appearance
- April 30, 1944, for the Philadelphia Phillies

MLB statistics
- Batting average: .083
- Home runs: 0
- Runs batted in: 1
- Stats at Baseball Reference

Teams
- Philadelphia Phillies (1944)

Leon Francis Riley Sr. (August 20, 1906 – September 13, 1970) was an American professional baseball player who became a manager in the minor leagues. During a playing career that stretched from 1927 to 1942 and 1944 to 1949, Riley appeared in 2,267 minor league games for 21 different teams, with a brief trial with the 1944 Philadelphia Phillies during the World War II manpower shortage. He was the father of Lee and Pat Riley.

== Biography ==
Born in Princeton, Nebraska, Riley was an outfielder and first baseman who stood 6 ft 1 in (1.85 m) (185 cm) tall, weighed 185 pounds (83.9 kg), batted left-handed, and threw right-handed. Although he reached the top minor-league level in 116 games for the Rochester Red Wings (1932) and Baltimore Orioles (1939) of the Class AA International League, he spent most of his playing career in the Class A Western League, leading that loop in triples with 27 in 1929.

In 1937, Riley became the playing manager with the Beatrice Blues in the Class D Nebraska State League. The Blues finished well below .500 that year, but Riley won the NSL batting title with a .372 batting average. In 1938, the Blues posted a winning mark and Riley repeated as batting champ with a .365 average, while also leading the NSL in runs batted in. He would manage for 11 seasons (1937–38; 1940–41; 1945–51) in the minor leagues, including stints in the farm systems of the Brooklyn Dodgers and the Phillies. Riley led the Class C Canadian–American League in home runs with 32 in 1941 and the Class D Pennsylvania–Ontario–New York League (PONY League) with 13 in 1945, when he was 39 years old.

Over his long minor-league playing career, Riley batted .314 with 2,418 hits and 248 home runs. In April 1944, at age 37, Riley appeared in four games for the Phillies, with 12 at bats, one hit (a double), and one RBI — for a career MLB batting average of .083. As a manager, he led the Schenectady Blue Jays to the 1947 Can-Am League championship.

Leon Riley died in Schenectady, New York, aged 64, in 1970.
