= Agnew, Nebraska =

Unincorporated community in Nebraska, U.S.

- Unincorporated community and Census designated place
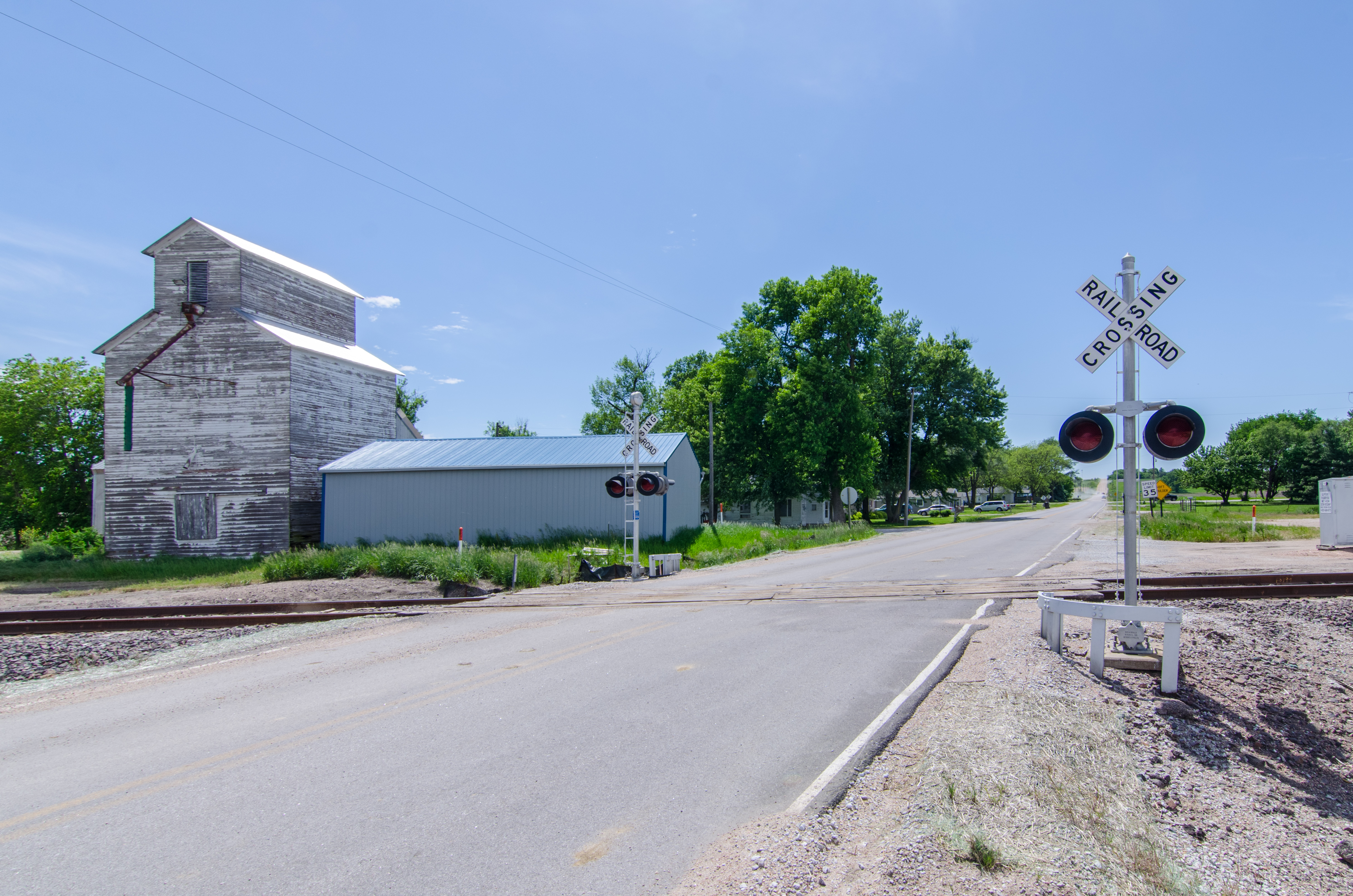
- West Agnew Road near Downtown Agnew

- Location in Nebraska Location in the United States
- Country: United States
- State: Nebraska
- County: Lancaster

Area
  - Total: 0.19 sq mi (0.49 km^{2})
  - Land: 0.19 sq mi (0.49 km^{2})
  - Water: 0 sq mi (0.00 km^{2})
- Elevation: 1,266 ft (386 m)

Population (2020)
  - Total: 30
  - Density: 159.2/sq mi (61.47/km^{2})
- Time zone: UTC-6 (Central (CST))
  - Summer (DST): UTC-5 (CDT)
- ZIP codes: 68428
- FIPS code: 31-00380
- GNIS feature ID: 2806910

Agnew is an unincorporated community and census-designated place (CDP) in Lancaster County, Nebraska, United States. The population was 30 at the 2020 census.

== History ==
A post office was established at Agnew in 1886, and remained in operation until it was discontinued in 1978. The community was named for William James Agnew, a railroad official. Agnew was platted in 1889.

== Demographics ==
Historical population
Census	Pop.	Note	%±
2020	30		—
U.S. Decennial Census
