= Sprague, Nebraska =

- Village
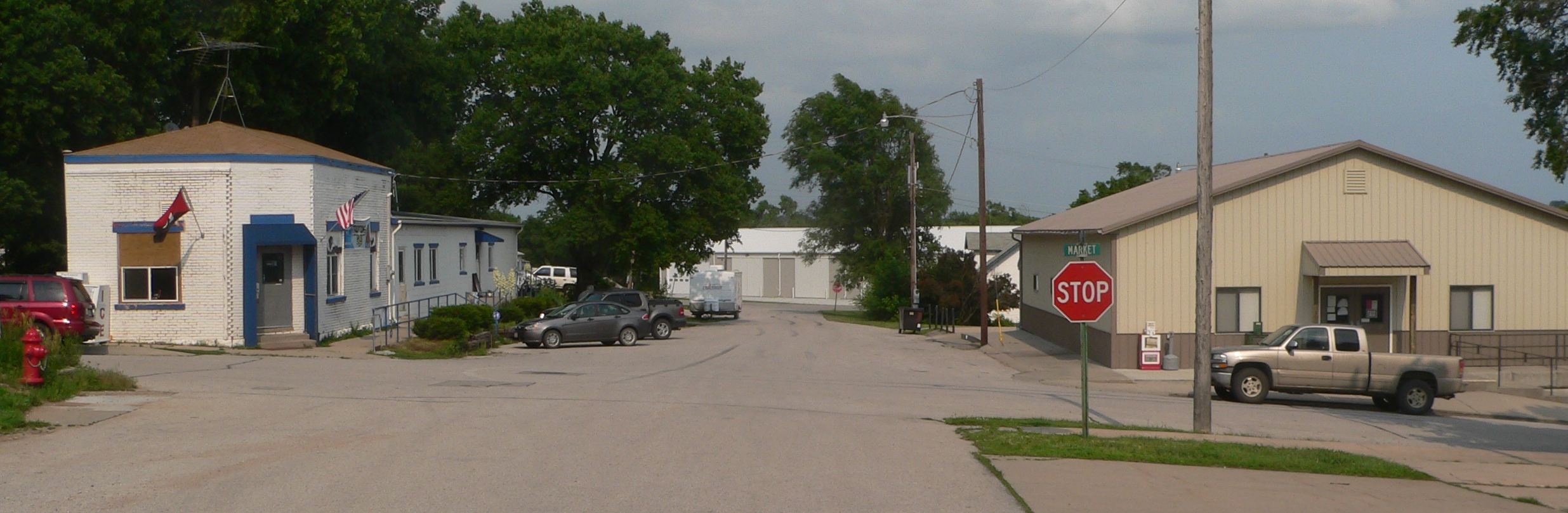
- Downtown Sprague: corner of Second and Market Streets

- Location of Sprague, Nebraska
- Coordinates: 40°37′31″N 96°44′44″W
- Country: United States
- State: Nebraska
- County: Lancaster

Area
  - Total: 0.10 sq mi (0.26 km^{2})
  - Land: 0.10 sq mi (0.26 km^{2})
  - Water: 0 sq mi (0.00 km^{2})
- Elevation: 1,289 ft (393 m)

Population (2020)
  - Total: 136
  - Density: 1,349.5/sq mi (521.05/km^{2})
- Time zone: UTC-6 (Central (CST))
  - Summer (DST): UTC-5 (CDT)
- ZIP code: 68438
- Area code: 402
- FIPS code: 31-46380
- GNIS feature ID: 2399874
- Website: spraguene.org

Sprague is a village in Lancaster County, Nebraska, United States. It is part of the Lincoln, Nebraska Metropolitan Statistical Area. The population was 136 at the 2020 census.

== History ==
In 1865, a settlement called Centerville established a post office in the area, but never grew into a sustainable community. Sprague was established in 1888 when the Missouri Pacific Railroad was extended to that point and was named after a local Civil War veteran, William Sprague, and his wife, Amy. In 1894, a station named "Martell" was established and platted by the Rock Island Railroad nearby, but the village was never incorporated. Sprague was incorporated in 1913, when it was no longer required there be a population of at least 200 people.

In 1912 and again in 1927, fires broke out and burned down much of the business sector of Sprague. In 1963, the Bluestem Conservation Dam was built in the area, creating a 325-acre lake. A conservation area was created around Bluestem Lake, creating 742 acres of recreational area. The lake increased numbers of retirement communities and recreational homes in the area, though it remains primarily rural and agricultural.

== Geography ==
According to the United States Census Bureau, the village has a total area of 0.10 square miles (0.26 km^{2}), all land.

== Demographics ==
Historical population
Census	Pop.	Note	%±
1920	112		—
1930	135		20.5%
1940	121		−10.4%
1950	110		−9.1%
1960	120		9.1%
1970	119		−0.8%
1980	168		41.2%
1990	157		−6.5%
2000	146		−7.0%
2010	142		−2.7%
2020	136		−4.2%
U.S. Decennial Census

=== 2010 census ===
As of the census of 2010, there were 142 people, 61 households, and 41 families residing in the village. The population density was 1,420.0 inhabitants per square mile (548.3/km^{2}). There were 63 housing units at an average density of 630.0 per square mile (243.2/km^{2}). The racial makeup of the village was 97.2% White, 0.7% from other races, and 2.1% from two or more races. Hispanic or Latino of any race were 1.4% of the population.

There were 61 households, of which 27.9% had children under the age of 18 living with them, 57.4% were married couples living together, 4.9% had a female householder with no husband present, 4.9% had a male householder with no wife present, and 32.8% were non-families. 27.9% of all households were made up of individuals, and 13.1% had someone living alone who was 65 years of age or older. The average household size was 2.33 and the average family size was 2.68.

The median age in the village was 39 years. 22.5% of residents were under the age of 18; 6.3% were between the ages of 18 and 24; 24.6% were from 25 to 44; 30.2% were from 45 to 64; and 16.2% were 65 years of age or older. The gender makeup of the village was 51.4% male and 48.6% female.

=== 2000 census ===
As of the census of 2000, there were 146 people, 59 households, and 42 families residing in the village. The population density was 1,164.9 inhabitants per square mile (449.8/km^{2}). There were 60 housing units at an average density of 478.7 per square mile (184.8/km^{2}). The racial makeup of the village was 96.58% White, 0.68% Native American, 1.37% from other races, and 1.37% from two or more races. Hispanic or Latino of any race were 1.37% of the population.

There were 59 households, out of which 32.2% had children under the age of 18 living with them, 62.7% were married couples living together, 1.7% had a female householder with no husband present, and 28.8% were non-families. 20.3% of all households were made up of individuals, and 11.9% had someone living alone who was 65 years of age or older. The average household size was 2.47 and the average family size was 2.86.

In the village, the population was spread out, with 21.9% under the age of 18, 6.8% from 18 to 24, 34.2% from 25 to 44, 23.3% from 45 to 64, and 13.7% who were 65 years of age or older. The median age was 41 years. For every 100 females, there were 84.8 males. For every 100 females age 18 and over, there were 83.9 males.

As of 2000 the median income for a household in the village was $40,000, and the median income for a family was $40,000. Males had a median income of $33,750 versus $22,000 for females. The per capita income for the village was $20,203. There were none of the families and 2.8% of the population living below the poverty line, including no under eighteens and 8.3% of those over 64.
