= Kramer, Nebraska =

Unincorporated community in Nebraska, United States

- Unincorporated community
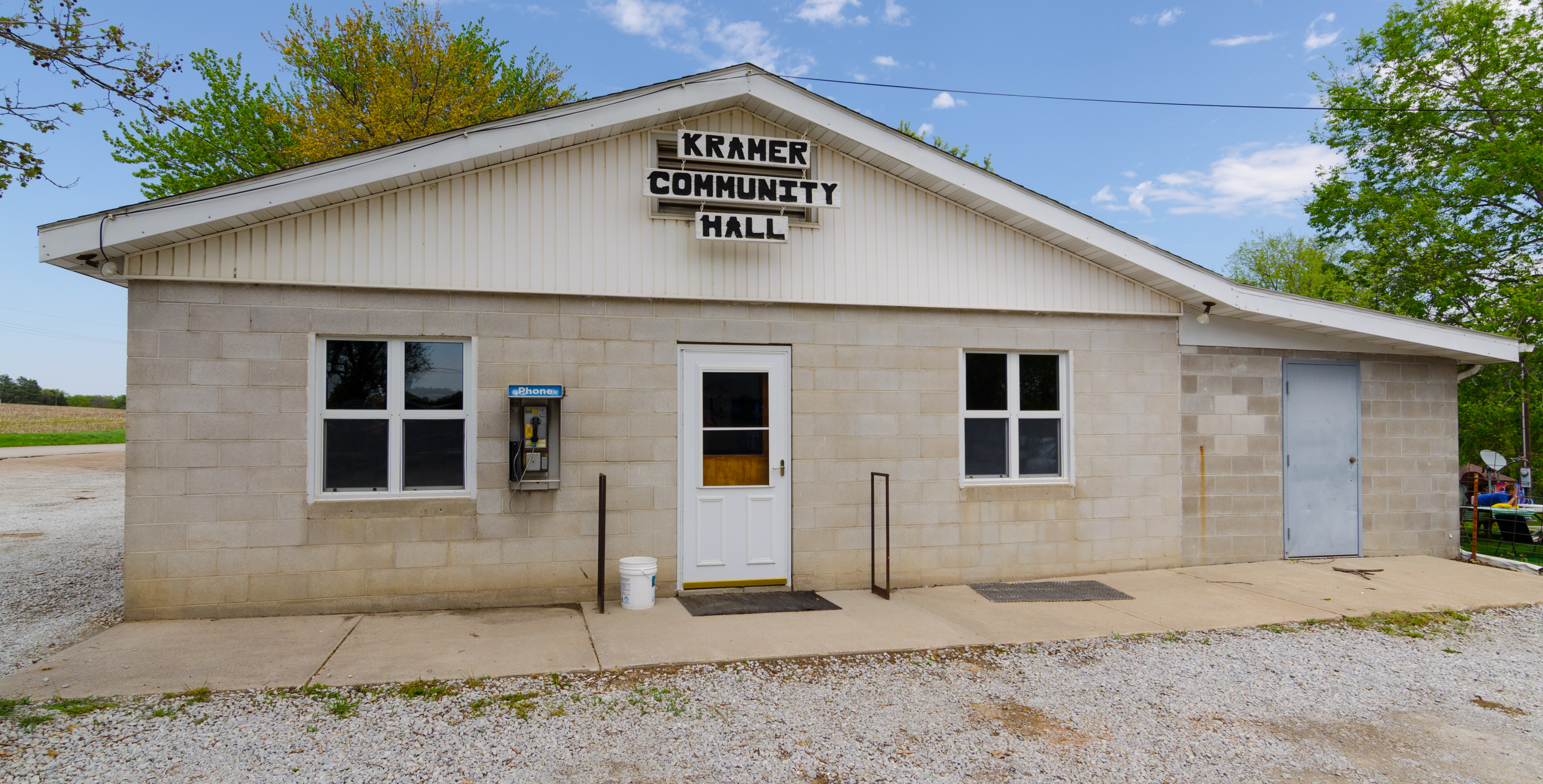
- Kramer Community Center

- Location in Nebraska Location in the United States
- Coordinates: 40°35′18″N 96°52′31″W
- Country: United States
- State: Nebraska
- County: Lancaster

Area
  - Total: 0.47 sq mi (1.22 km^{2})
  - Land: 0.47 sq mi (1.22 km^{2})
  - Water: 0 sq mi (0.00 km^{2})
- Elevation: 1,355 ft (413 m)

Population (2020)
  - Total: 26
  - Density: 55.3/sq mi (21.36/km^{2})
- Time zone: UTC-6 (Central (CST))
  - Summer (DST): UTC-5 (CDT)
- ZIP codes: 68333
- FIPS code: 25720
- GNIS feature ID: 2806913

Kramer is an unincorporated community and census-designated place (CDP) in Lancaster County, Nebraska, United States. The population was 26 as of the 2020 census.

== History ==
Kramer was founded in 1888. It was named for Mr. Kramer, the original owner of the town site.

A post office was established in Kramer in 1889, and remained in operation until it was discontinued in 1955.

== Demographics ==
Historical population
Census	Pop.	Note	%±
2020	26		—
U.S. Decennial Census
