= Panama, Nebraska =

- Village
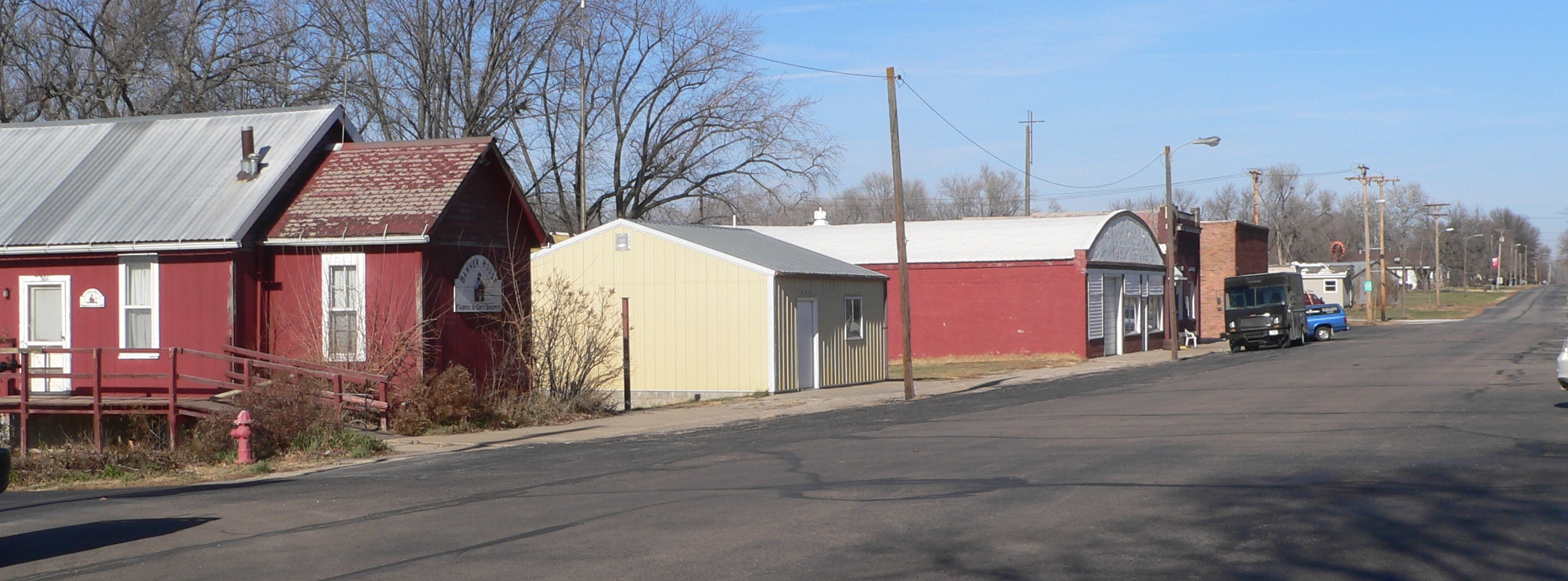
- Downtown Panama: Locust Street

- Location of Panama, Nebraska
- Coordinates: 40°35′59″N 96°30′40″W
- Country: United States
- State: Nebraska
- County: Lancaster

Government
  - Type: Board of Trustees
  - Chairman (Mayor): Travis Filing
  - Trustees: Jan Hart Tim Watters Shirley Ele Larry Gadeken

Area
  - Total: 0.29 sq mi (0.74 km^{2})
  - Land: 0.29 sq mi (0.74 km^{2})
  - Water: 0 sq mi (0.00 km^{2})
- Elevation: 1,404 ft (428 m)

Population (2020)
  - Total: 235
  - Density: 828.0/sq mi (319.69/km^{2})
- Time zone: UTC-6 (Central (CST))
  - Summer (DST): UTC-5 (CDT)
- ZIP code: 68419
- Area code: 402
- FIPS code: 31-38225
- GNIS feature ID: 2399618
- Website: www.villageofpanama.net

Panama is a village in Lancaster County, Nebraska, United States. It is part of the Lincoln, Nebraska Metropolitan Statistical Area. The population was 235 at the 2020 census.

== History ==
In 1879, the Panama Cemetery Association was formed and raised funds to dig a well. Panama was originally founded one mile south of its present location but was moved in order to be closer to the railway. In 1888, the village was officially founded on land that was previously owned by Moses J. Mitton, John Forrest, and Gilbert F. Steeves. According to local folk history, the village's original by-laws contained a clause inserted by a descendant of Gilbert F. Steeves, Caroline "Carrie" Steeves, which stated that if the village allowed any business to sell alcohol in the village, the Steeves family would reclaim the land they had deeded to the village. Panama was incorporated as a village in 1904. New by-laws and ordinances were enacted when the village was incorporated and again in 1977, but it is still illegal to sell alcohol in the village. The village was likely named after the Isthmus of Panama, which had gained notoriety at the time due to the United States' involvement in building the Panama Canal.

== Geography ==
According to the United States Census Bureau, the village has a total area of 0.28 square miles (0.73 km^{2}), all land.

== Demographics ==
Historical population
Census	Pop.	Note	%±
1910	230		—
1920	210		−8.7%
1930	198		−5.7%
1940	174		−12.1%
1950	168		−3.4%
1960	155		−7.7%
1970	153		−1.3%
1980	160		4.6%
1990	207		29.4%
2000	253		22.2%
2010	256		1.2%
2020	235		−8.2%
U.S. Decennial Census

=== 2010 census ===
As of the census of 2010, there were 256 people, 90 households, and 66 families residing in the village. The population density was 914.3 inhabitants per square mile (353.0/km^{2}). There were 100 housing units at an average density of 357.1 units per square mile (137.9 units/km^{2}). The racial makeup of the village was 98.4% White, 0.8% African American, 0.4% Asian, and 0.4% from two or more races.

There were 90 households, of which 41.1% had children under the age of 18 living with them, 66.7% were married couples living together, 2.2% had a female householder with no husband present, 4.4% had a male householder with no wife present, and 26.7% were non-families. 21.1% of all households were made up of individuals, and 8.9% had someone living alone who was 65 years of age or older. The average household size was 2.84 and the average family size was 3.36.

The median age in the village was 38 years. 32.4% of residents were under the age of 18; 3.9% were between the ages of 18 and 24; 23.2% were from 25 to 44; 29.3% were from 45 to 64; and 11.3% were 65 years of age or older. The gender makeup of the village was 53.1% male and 46.9% female.

=== 2000 census ===
As of the census of 2000, there were 253 people, 97 households, and 77 families residing in the village. The population density was 943.2 inhabitants per square mile (364.2/km^{2}). There were 101 housing units at an average density of 376.5 units per square mile (145.4 units/km^{2}). The racial makeup of the village was 98.81% White, 0.79% African American and 0.40% Asian. Hispanic or Latino of any race were 0.79% of the population.

There were 97 households, out of which 42.3% had children under the age of 18 living with them, 71.1% were married couples living together, 5.2% had a female householder with no husband present, and 20.6% were non-families. 16.5% of all households were made up of individuals, and 8.2% had someone living alone who was 65 years of age or older. The average household size was 2.61 and the average family size was 2.96.

In the village, the population was spread out, with 30.4% under the age of 18, 4.7% from 18 to 24, 30.0% from 25 to 44, 22.1% from 45 to 64, and 12.6% who were 65 years of age or older. The median age was 37 years. For every 100 females, there were 93.1 males. For every 100 females age 18 and over, there were 87.2 males.

As of 2000 the median income for a household in the village was $47,841, and the median income for a family was $50,625. Males had a median income of $36,563 versus $18,750 for females. The per capita income for the village was $17,596. None of the families and 1.4% of the population were living below the poverty line.

== Notable people ==
Robert Dinsmore Harrison - U.S. Congressman 1951–1959.

== See also ==
- History of Lincoln, Nebraska
- History of the Great Plains
- History of Nebraska
- List of municipalities in Nebraska
