= Arbor, Nebraska =

Unincorporated community in Nebraska, United States

- Unincorporated community
- Location within Nebraska Location within the United States
- Country: United States
- State: Nebraska
- County: Lancaster
- Elevation: 1,158 ft (353 m)
- Time zone: UTC-6 (CST)
  - Summer (DST): UTC-5 (CDT)
- GNIS feature ID: 835235

Arbor is an unincorporated community in Lancaster County, Nebraska, United States.

== History ==
Arbor may be named from Arbor Lodge, the estate of Julius Sterling Morton, the 3rd United States Secretary of Agriculture. However, another source speculates that Arbor was likely named for the trees lining the town site. Arbor had a post office from 1894 until 1900.
