= Pioneers Park Nature Center =

Nature reserve in Nebraska, United States

Pioneers Park Nature Center, established in 1963, is a 668-acre (2.70 km^{2}) nature preserve located within Pioneers Park, which is located at the intersections of South Coddington and West Van Dorn Streets in Lincoln, Nebraska. Both Pioneers Park and the Nature Center within it are operated by the Lincoln Parks and Recreation Department.

== About ==
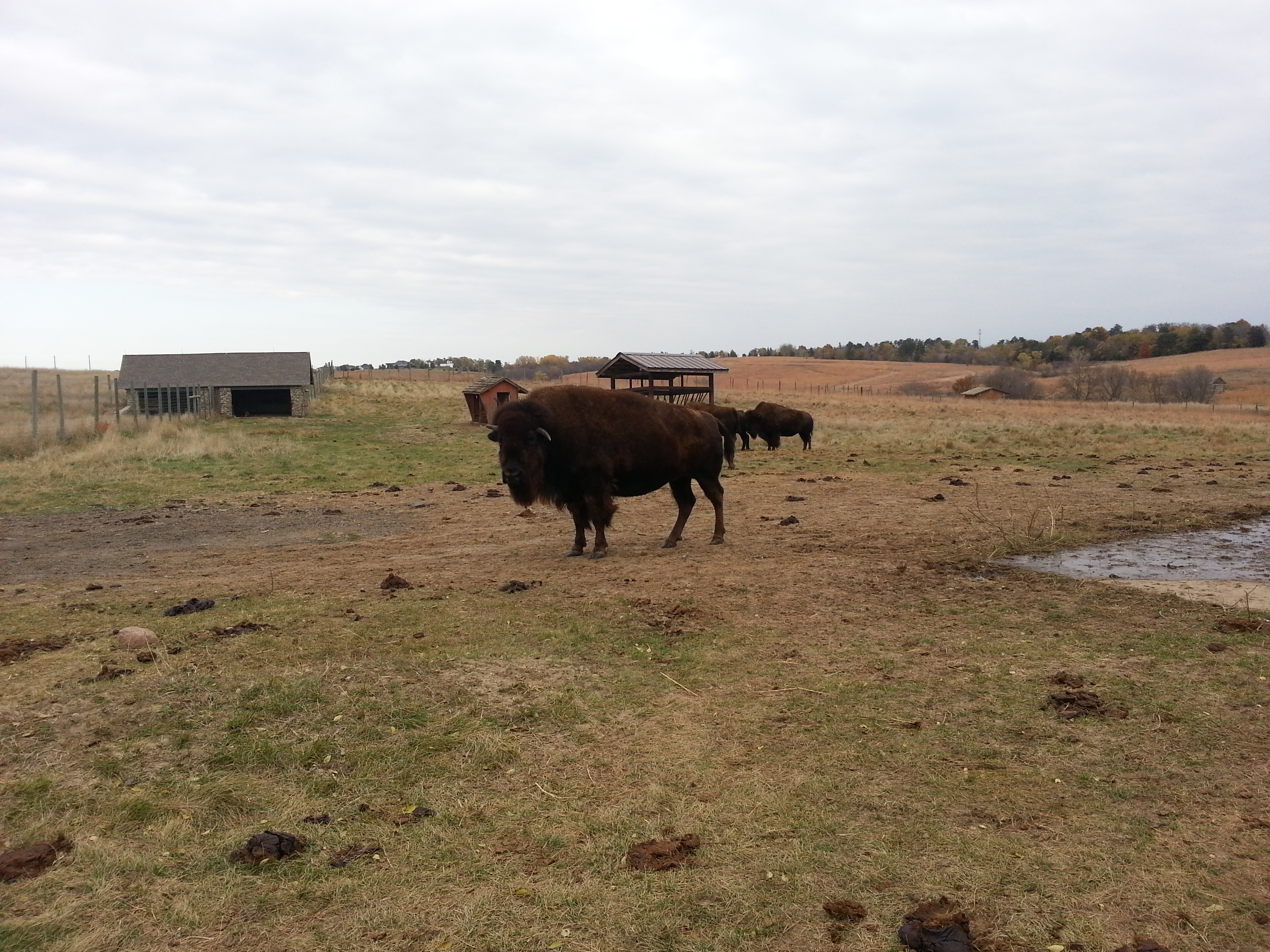
Bison grazing at Pioneers Park Nature Center.

Beginning in 1963 with just 40 acres in the southwest corner of Pioneers Park, the Nature Center now comprises the western half of Pioneers Park. The sanctuary includes sections on two sides of Haines Branch Creek. There are eight total miles of trails, several ponds, two interpretive buildings, a dedicated outdoor education building, and a robust activity schedule throughout the year.

The Chet Ager building contains a variety of exhibits including live, rescued animals and taxidermy mounts, and offers unobstructed views of the adjacent bird garden and Heron Wetland. Immediately surrounding the diverse herb garden next to the building. The Ager building was originally two buildings, built 1963 and 1966, but they were joined with a lobby and breezeway in 1995.

Since 2007, the Prairie Building has housed prairie and live animal displays, an auditorium, classroom space, and administrative offices. The building includes some straw bale construction, a green roof, and other sustainable building practices and is Leadership in Energy and Environmental Design (LEED) Silver certified. Construction of the Prairie Building was accomplished in three phases: the education wing in 1997, the Malinovskis Auditorium in 2000, and the Exhibit Hall and office space in 2007. An expansive deck was installed on the west side of the building in 2019.

There are more than 8 miles (12 km) of maintained trails in the Nature Center that traverse prairie, woodlands and wetlands. A herd of bison are exhibited in their natural grassland habitat along the nature center trails.

The Nature Center is open year-round, offering many activities including an on-site preschool and Pre-K program, field trips for school and youth groups, nature day camps for ages 6–14, guided night hikes and many other special events.

== History ==
In the 1930s, three ponds were dredged in the area to encourage waterfowl to visit the land. In 1963, 40 acres roughly encompassing these ponds were dedicated as the Chet Ager Bird and Wildlife Nature Study Sanctuary. The following year, the first of the buildings was completed at the northern edge of one of ponds.

City property that had previously been farmed was acquired by the sanctuary in 1975, adding sixteen acres on the south side of Haines Branch Creek. This land was connected to the original 40 acres by a suspension bridge built in 1976 by the Youth Conservation Corps.

In 1984, planning for the sanctuary began to focus on restoring and preserving native ecosystems and displaying native wildlife within the sanctuary. Previously, the sanctuary had adjoined a drive-through zoo featuring exotic animals such as zebu and water buffalo. In 1985, the 80 acres on which the zoo was built were acquired by the Chet Ager facility. The exotic animals were sold or traded to zoos and replaced with native wildlife such as foxes, deer, turkeys, bison, and elk. Approximately 40 acres of the 1985 addition lies north of the current Prairie Building. Now known as Hands-On Prairie, it is restored tallgrass prairie.

In 1996, the Robert Powell family donated 56 acres to the Nature Center and the land was named Verley Prairie in honor of Robert Powell's uncle, Ben Verley. Verley Prairie is located south of Haines Branch Creek and west of Harrington Prairie.

Between 1997 and 2005, David and Bonnie Martin sold or donated a total of 465 acres of pastureland to the Nature Center. The land is divided into three sections. The initial 157 acres, acquired in 1997, are Martin Prairie, which stretches north from the Hands-on Prairie to West Van Dorn Street. Hilltop Prairie, otherwise known as "The 80," added a block of 80 acres to the western edge of the existing Nature Center when purchased from the Martins in 1999. The final 228 acres, known as Foundation Prairie, were purchased in 2005. Approximately one-third of Foundation Prairie has never been plowed. The Foundation Prairie moved the Nature Center's western border to Southwest 56th Street.

In 2008, the Nebraska legislature voted to move the Nebraska State Fair from Lincoln to Grand Island. In the aftermath of that decision, two historic buildings that were part of the State Fair's Heritage Village were moved to the Nature Center. In 2009, a historic one-room schoolhouse known as Heritage School was moved to the eastern edge of Hands-On Prairie. The following year the Hudson Cabin, a one-room log home originally built in 1863, was sited on the southern border of Martin Prairie. Both historic buildings were dedicated on the site in 2010, and are now used for educational programs and special events. In 2021, the schoolhouse was renamed Cunningham School in a return to the original name of the school—named for the landowner who originally donated land for the school in Saunders County, Nebraska.

== Geography ==
The Nature Center's administrative building is located at 40°46′28″N 96°46′36″W. The 668 acres of land within the Nature Center contain tallgrass prairies, lowland prairies, wetlands, woodlands, and streams. Nearly 500 acres of this land is tallgrass prairie.

== Land Management ==
The daily maintenance of the Nature Center is performed by the Pioneers Park Nature Center Land Management Crew. The Land Management Crew maintain trails, the buildings within the Nature Center grounds, and remove invasive trees and weeds, particularly buckthorn, invasive thistles, garlic mustard, and leafy spurge. Each year, in collaboration with the Salt Valley Greenway and Prairie Corridor project, the Land Management Crew conducts prescribed burns. Cattle grazing is also employed as a conservation technique on the prairies managed by the Nature Center.

Live exhibits of small herpetofauna and raptors are cared for by Nature Center staff. Large mammals on exhibition are cared for by the Lincoln Parks and Recreation Southwest District.
