= Martell, Nebraska =

Unincorporated community in Nebraska, United States

- Unincorporated community and Census designated place
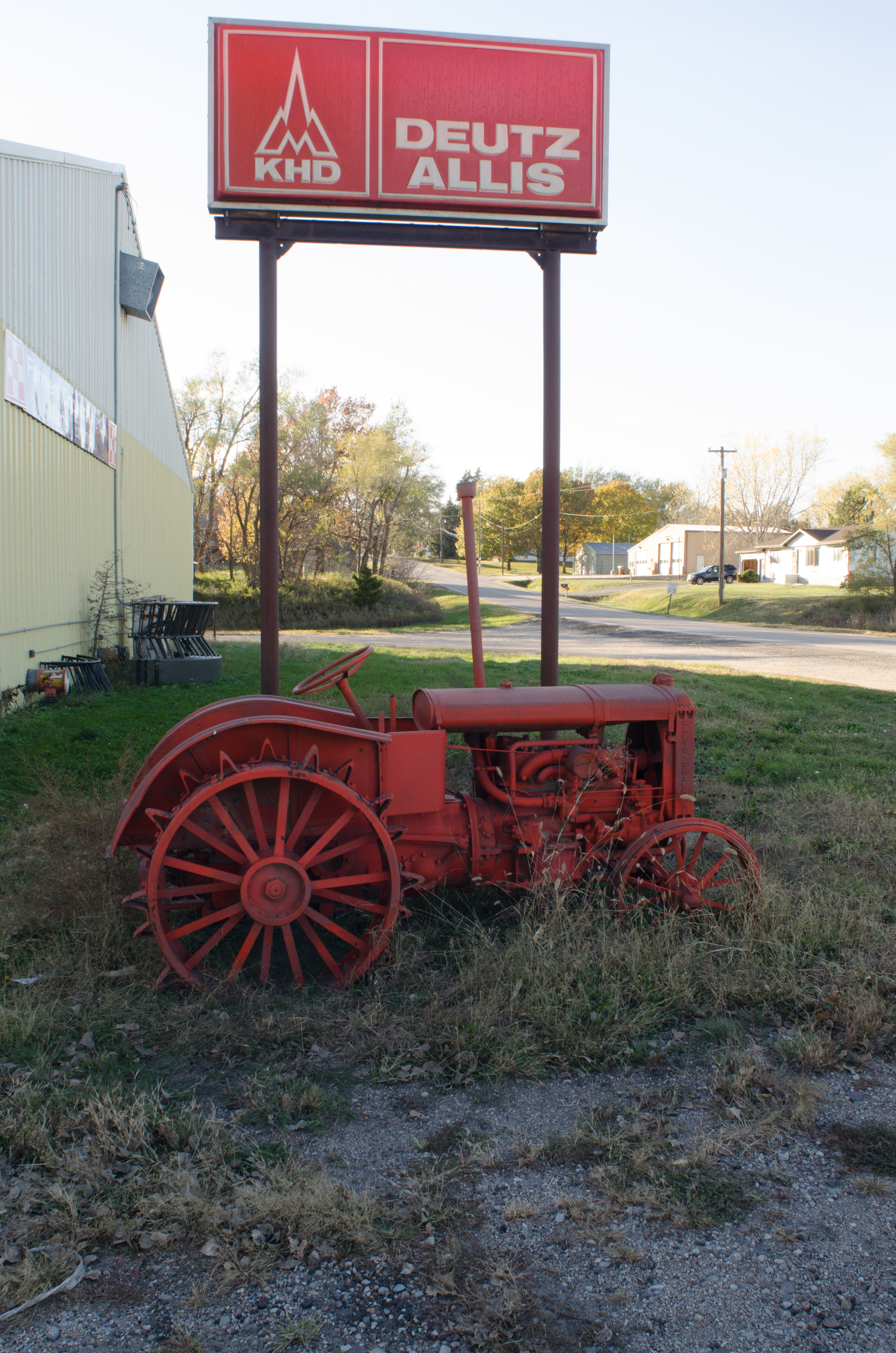
- A Co-Op in Martell, Nebraska

- Location in Nebraska Location in the United States
- Coordinates: 40°38′20″N 96°45′32″W
- Country: United States
- State: Nebraska
- County: Lancaster

Area
  - Total: 0.19 sq mi (0.49 km^{2})
  - Land: 0.19 sq mi (0.49 km^{2})
  - Water: 0 sq mi (0.00 km^{2})
- Elevation: 1,352 ft (412 m)

Population (2020)
  - Total: 125
  - Density: 656.1/sq mi (253.34/km^{2})
- Time zone: UTC-6 (Central (CST))
  - Summer (DST): UTC-5 (CDT)
- ZIP codes: 68404
- FIPS code: 31-30835
- GNIS feature ID: 2806914

Martell (also Martel) is an unincorporated community and census-designated place (CDP) in southwestern Lancaster County, Nebraska, United States. It lies along local roads southwest of the city of Lincoln, the county seat of Lancaster County and Nebraska's state capital. Although Martell is unincorporated, it has a post office, with the ZIP code of 68404. The population was 125 at the 2020 census.

== History ==
Martell was named after Charles Martel, the 8th-century Duke of the Franks. The community's name was also spelled Martel until the Board on Geographic Names officially decided in favor of "Martell" in 1896.

== Demographics ==
Historical population
Census	Pop.	Note	%±
2020	125		—
U.S. Decennial Census
