= Emerald, Nebraska =

Unincorporated community in Nebraska, United States

- Unincorporated community
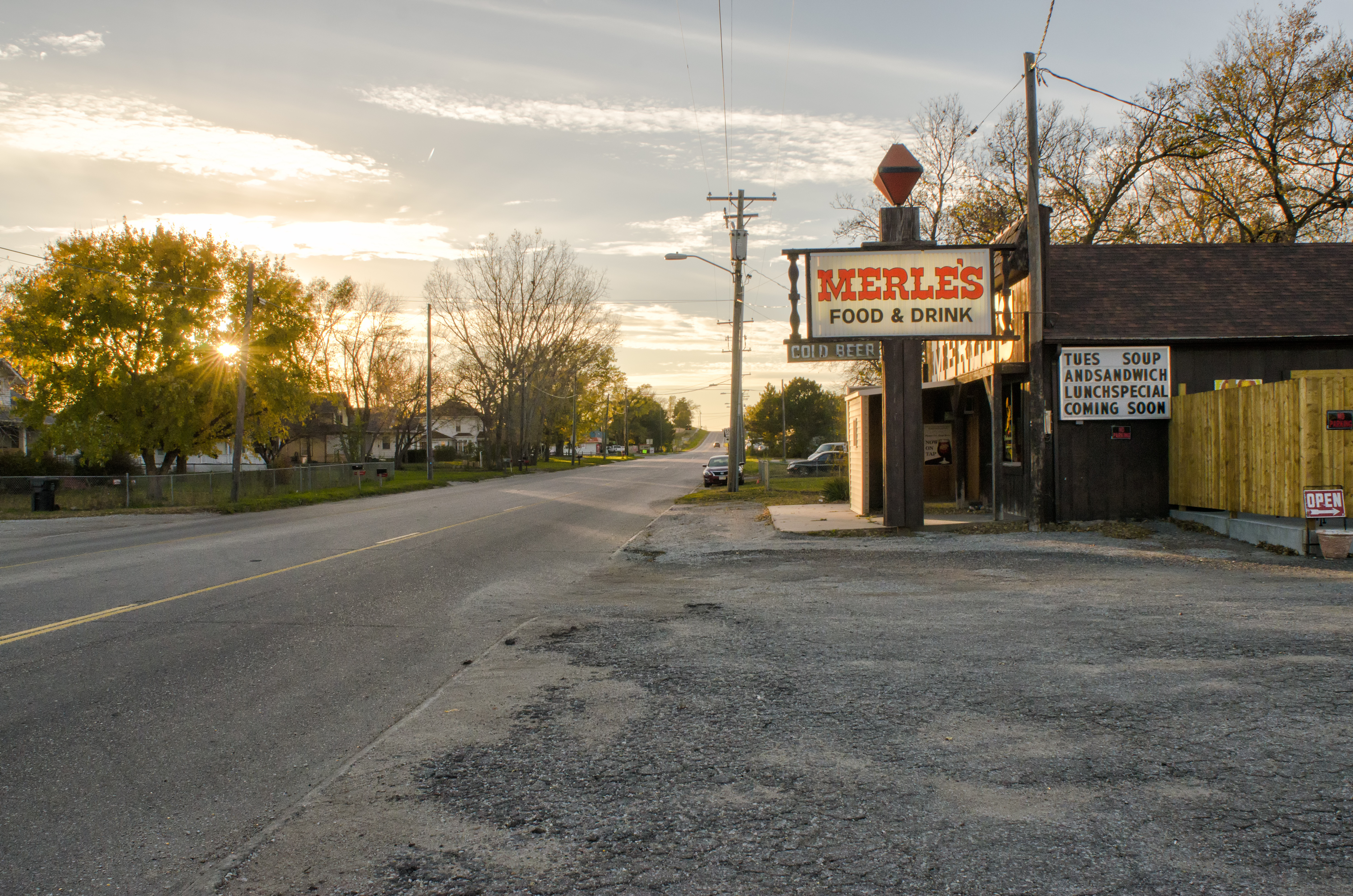
- Merle's Food & Drink (Now closed)

- Location in Nebraska Location in the United States
- Coordinates: 40°48′47″N 96°50′07″W
- Country: United States
- State: Nebraska
- County: Lancaster

Area
  - Total: 0.59 sq mi (1.52 km^{2})
  - Land: 0.59 sq mi (1.52 km^{2})
  - Water: 0 sq mi (0.00 km^{2})
- Elevation: 1,204 ft (367 m)

Population (2020)
  - Total: 45
  - Density: 76.4/sq mi (29.51/km^{2})
- Time zone: UTC-6 (Central (CST))
  - Summer (DST): UTC-5 (CDT)
- ZIP codes: 68528
- FIPS code: 31-15675
- GNIS feature ID: 2806912

Emerald is an unincorporated community and census-designated place (CDP) in Lancaster County, Nebraska, United States. The population was 45 at the 2020 census.

== History ==
A post office was established at Emerald in 1884, and remained in operation until it was discontinued in 1943. The community was named "Emerald" because its landscape was said to be as green as an emerald.

== Education ==
A portion of Emerald is within Lincoln Public Schools. Another portion is zoned to Malcolm Public Schools.

== Demographics ==
Historical population
Census	Pop.	Note	%±
2020	45		—
U.S. Decennial Census
