= Rokeby, Nebraska =

- Unincorporated community
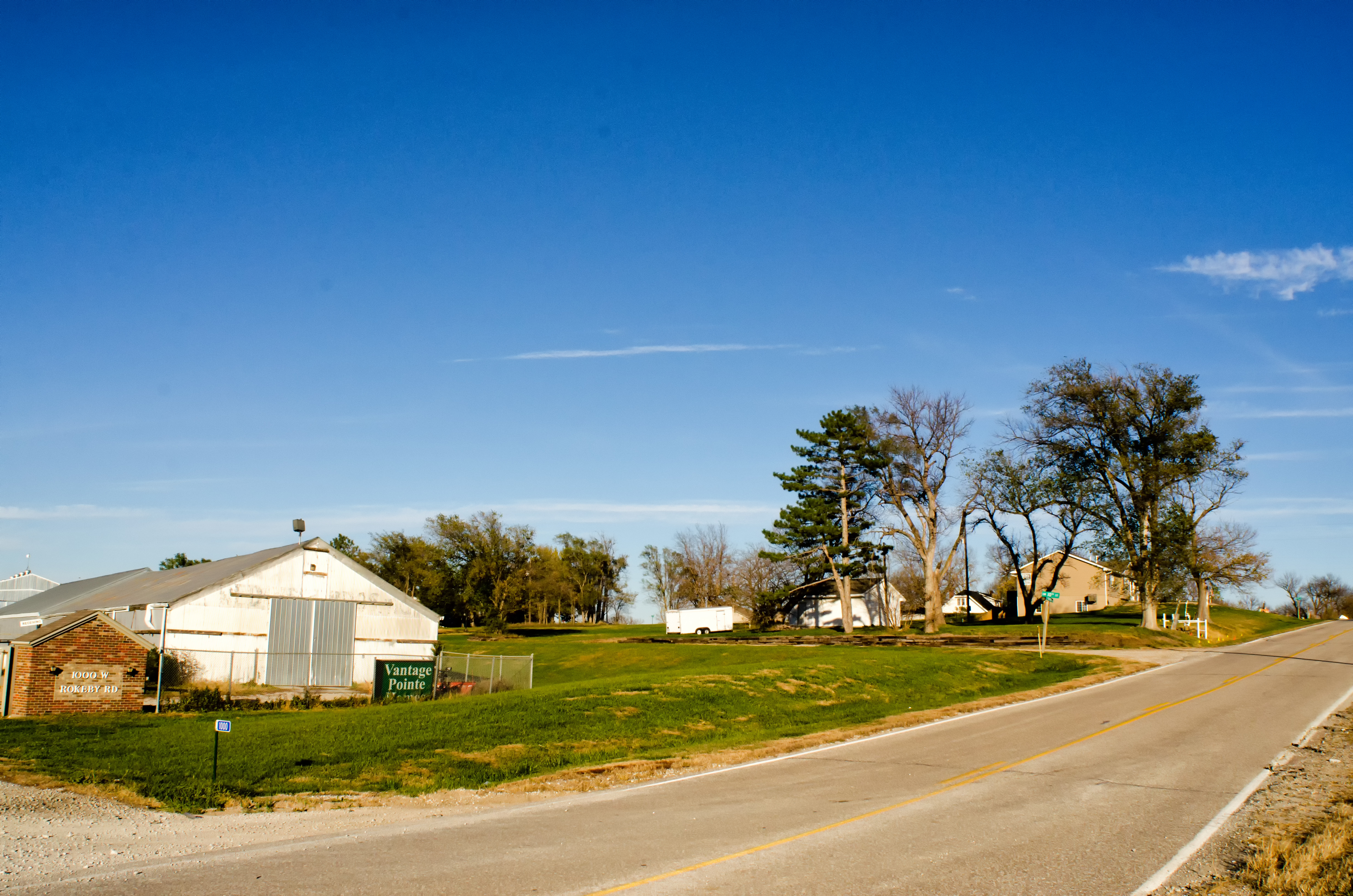
- Rokeby Road

- Location in Nebraska Location in the United States
- Coordinates: 40°42′43″N 96°44′10″W
- Country: United States
- State: Nebraska
- County: Lancaster
- Elevation: 1,250 ft (380 m)
- Time zone: UTC-6 (Central (CST))
  - Summer (DST): UTC-5 (CDT)
- ZIP codes: 68523
- GNIS feature ID: 832666

Rokeby is an unincorporated community in Lancaster County, Nebraska, United States.

== History ==
A post office was established in Rokeby in 1894. William Kennedy was the first postmaster. It remained in operation until it was discontinued in 1919. The community was likely named after the poem Rokeby by Walter Scott.
