= Princeton, Nebraska =

- Unincorporated Community and Census designated place
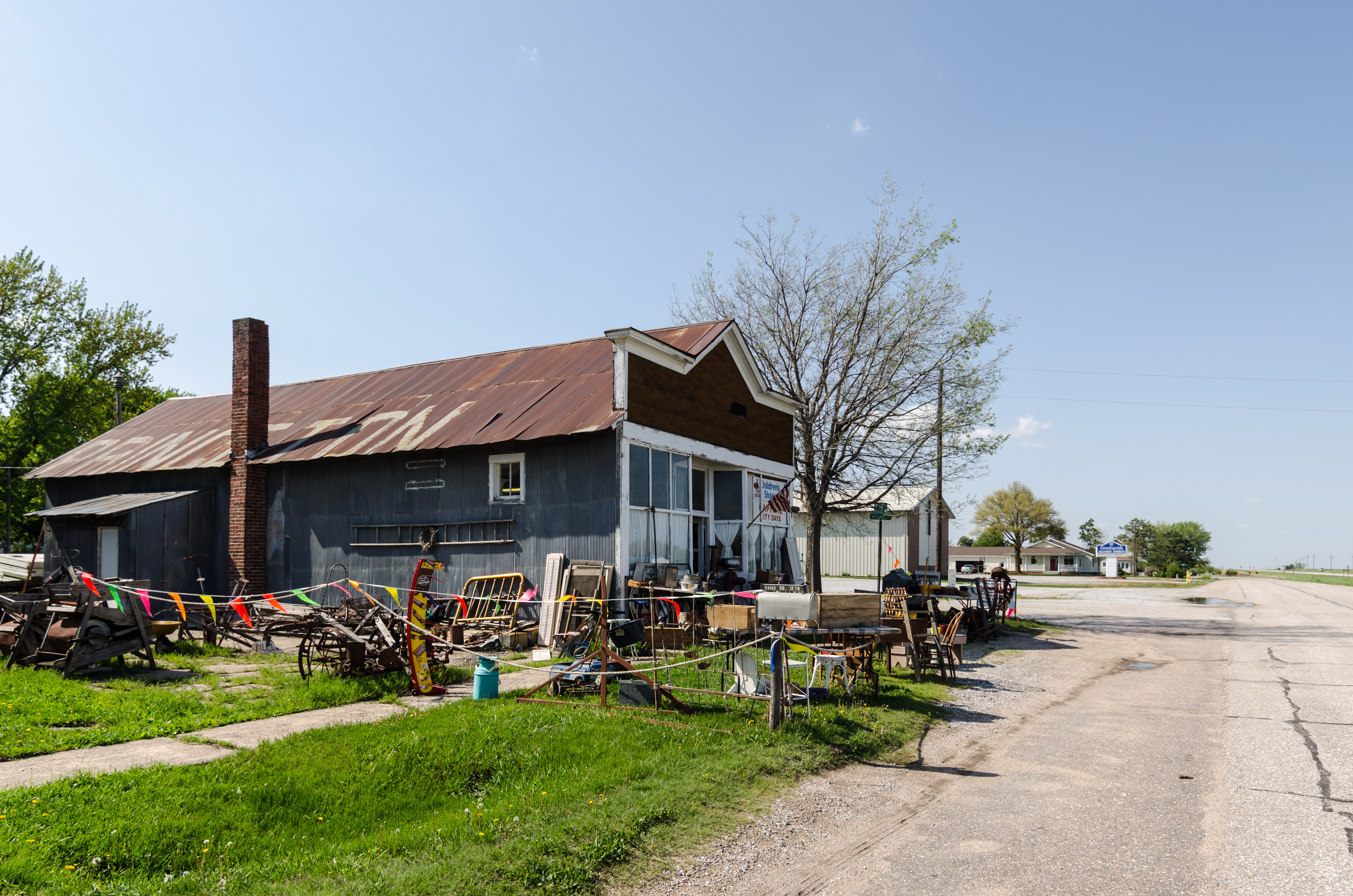
- Shady Rest Antiques

- Location in Nebraska Location in the United States
- Coordinates: 40°34′34″N 96°42′21″W
- Country: United States
- State: Nebraska
- County: Lancaster

Area
  - Total: 0.29 sq mi (0.75 km^{2})
  - Land: 0.29 sq mi (0.75 km^{2})
  - Water: 0 sq mi (0.00 km^{2})
- Elevation: 1,431 ft (436 m)

Population (2020)
  - Total: 51
  - Density: 176/sq mi (67.8/km^{2})
- Time zone: UTC-6 (Central (CST))
  - Summer (DST): UTC-5 (CDT)
- ZIP code: 68404
- Area code: 402
- FIPS code: 31-40395
- GNIS feature ID: 2806916

Princeton is an unincorporated community and census-designated place (CDP) in Lancaster County, Nebraska, United States. The population was 51 at the 2020 census.

== History ==
Princeton was founded in 1886. It was likely named after Princeton, New Jersey.

A post office was established in Princeton in 1886, and remained in operation until it was discontinued in 1959.

Leon Riley, a baseball player and manager and father of National Basketball Association player, head coach and manager Pat Riley, was born here. During a playing career that stretched from 1927 to 1942 and 1944 to 1949, Riley appeared in 2,267 minor league games for 21 different teams, with a brief trial with the 1944 Philadelphia Phillies during the World War II manpower shortage.

== Demographics ==
Historical population
| Census | Pop. | Note | %± |
|---|---|---|---|
| 2020 | 51 | | — |
U.S. Decennial Census
