= Cheney, Nebraska =

Unincorporated community in Nebraska, United States

- Unincorporated community and Census designated place
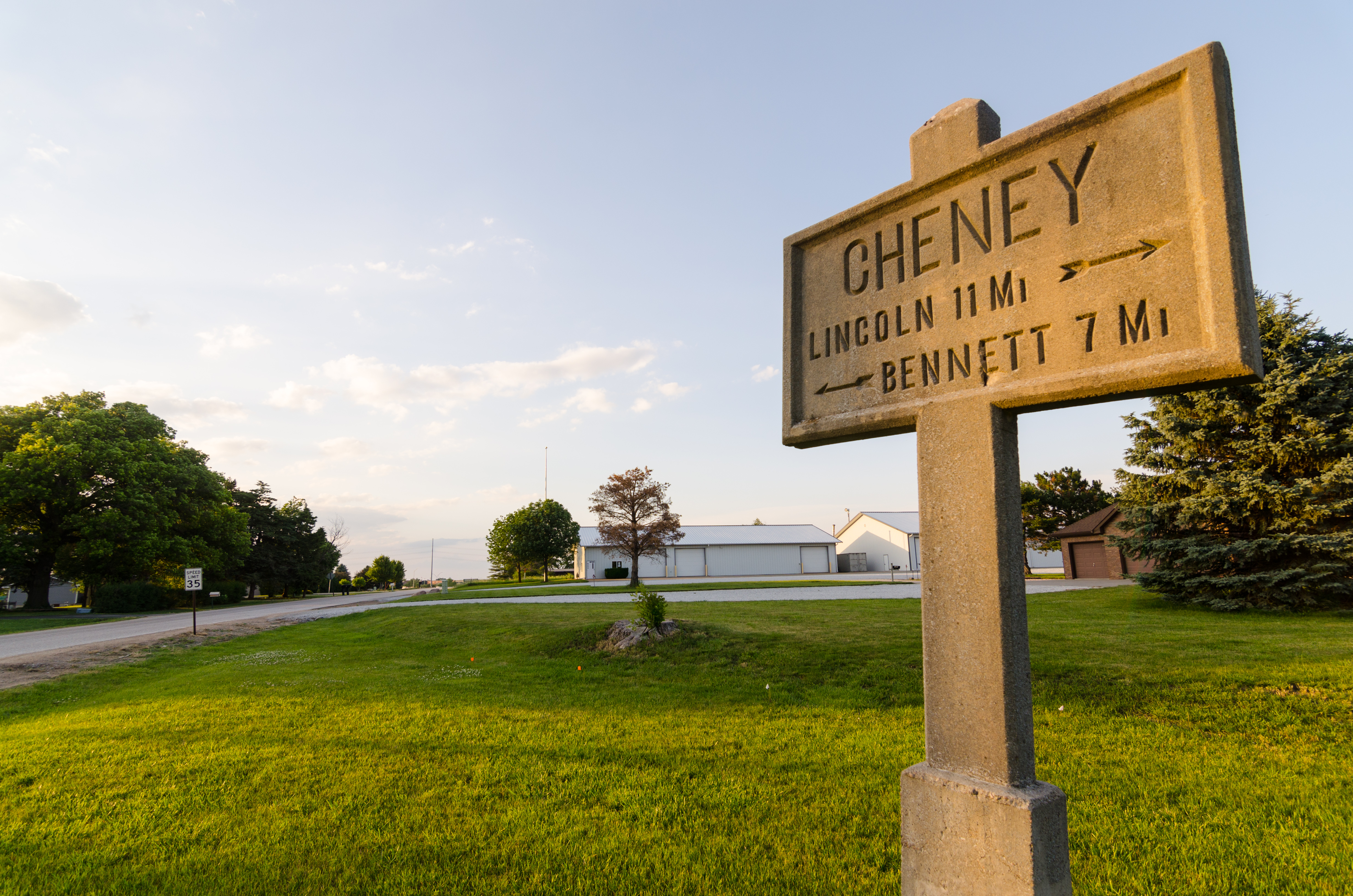
- A Road Sign Near Cheney

- Location in Nebraska Location in the United States
- Coordinates: 40°43′34″N 96°35′37″W
- Country: United States
- State: Nebraska
- County: Lancaster

Area
  - Total: 0.14 sq mi (0.37 km^{2})
  - Land: 0.14 sq mi (0.37 km^{2})
  - Water: 0 sq mi (0.00 km^{2})
- Elevation: 1,444 ft (440 m)

Population (2020)
  - Total: 164
  - Density: 1,160.9/sq mi (448.21/km^{2})
- Time zone: UTC-6 (Central (CST))
  - Summer (DST): UTC-5 (CDT)
- ZIP codes: 68526
- FIPS code: 31-08990
- GNIS feature ID: 2806911

Cheney is an unincorporated community and census-designated place (CDP) in Lancaster County, Nebraska, United States. The population was 164 at the 2020 census.

== History ==
In 1867, the Midland Pacific Railroad was established in Nebraska City. Midland Pacific began to build a line to Lincoln the following year, passing through the land owned by Mr. Cheney. A station was created on his land in 1871, named Cheney's Station. The village of Cheney was platted in 1874, a triangular map along the railroad. The first school was built in 1874 and a post office was established at Cheney in 1876.

Cheney has played host to a lumberyard, a grocery store, three churches, a bank, a hardware store, a grain elevator, a general store, and a dance hall through the years, despite never growing past a population of 49. Formerly, Cheney was the eastern terminus of Lincoln's Old Cheney Road, a major east-west street in the city, but Old Cheney today passes roughly two miles north of the village of Cheney.

Lincoln's southeastward expansion means that Cheney is bordered by the city of Lincoln to the north and west. As the village is triangular, this means that only the eastern portion of Cheney is not immediately bordered by Lincoln.

== Education ==
A portion of Cheney is in Lincoln Public Schools.

== Demographics ==
Historical population
Census	Pop.	Note	%±
2020	164		—
U.S. Decennial Census
