= Holland, Nebraska =

Unincorporated community in Nebraska, United States

- Unincorporated community
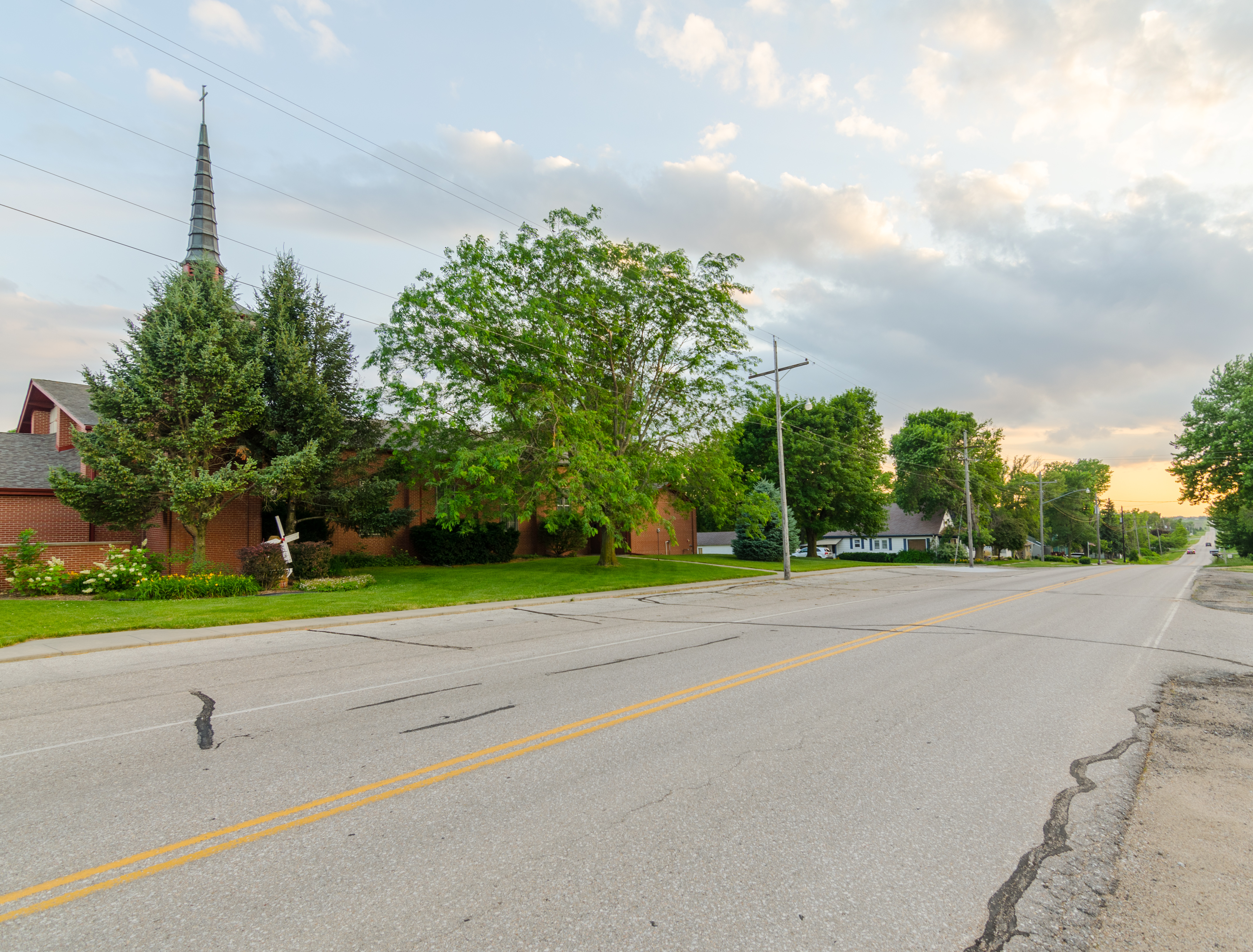
- Panama Road in Holland

- Location in Nebraska Location in the United States
- Coordinates: 40°35′47″N 96°35′30″W
- Country: United States
- State: Nebraska
- County: Lancaster
- Elevation: 1,362 ft (415 m)
- Time zone: UTC-6 (Central (CST))
  - Summer (DST): UTC-5 (CDT)
- ZIP codes: 68372
- GNIS feature ID: 830052

Holland is an unincorporated community in Lancaster County, Nebraska, United States.

== History ==
Holland was founded in about 1886. A large share of the early settlers being natives of Holland caused the name to be selected.

There was an ice cream parlor operated by two unmarried sisters. Holland was busier than Panama and Pella. Holland has a street light as well. There was also a Dutch Reformed Church in Holland.
