= Jalapa, Nebraska =

Bygone town in Dodge County, Nebraska

- Abandoned village
- Location within the state of Nebraska
- Coordinates: 41.5650544°N 96.5484314°W
- Country: United States
- State: Nebraska
- County: Dodge
- Established: March 13, 1855

Population (2000)
  - Total: 0
- Time zone: UTC-6 (Central (CST))
  - Summer (DST): UTC-5 (CDT)
- Area code: 402

Jalapa (aka Jalapa City aka Jalappa) is a bygone town in Dodge County, Nebraska, United States. Located about 3 miles (4.8 km) south of Hooper on the north side of Maple Creek (a tributary to the Elkhorn River) in Section 5 of the Nickerson Township. It is about 9 miles (14 km) north and nine miles west of Fremont.

== History ==
=== Nebraska Territory, Dodge County, and statehood ===
The Nebraska Territory was established by the United States May 30, 1854. Nebraska was admitted to the Union as a state, March 1, 1867. Dodge County was organized by an act of the Nebraska Territorial Legislature during the winter of 1854–1855. Its initial boundaries were established by legislation dated March 15, 1855. The county was named for Augustus Caesar Dodge, then a U.S. senator from Iowa (1848–1855) and a prominent supporter of the Kansas–Nebraska Act. As a member of the Senate Committee on Territories, Senator Dodge introduced the bill that created the Nebraska Territory.

=== Incorporation of Jalapa ===
Jalapa was incorporated as Jalapa City by an Act and Bill, House File No. 164, of the First Nebraska Territorial Legislature, March 16, 1855.

=== Early settlers of Jalapa ===
Orlando Allen Himebaugh – who moved from DeKalb County, Indiana, to Jalapa in June 1856 – was the proprietor of the Jalapa townsite and later became the first settler in Hooper. He and his brother, Pierson ("Pierce") C. Himebaugh, initially lived in a small log cabin built of local cottonwood on what later became Orlando's farm, located on the north side of Maple Creek in Section 5, Township 18 North, Range 8 East of the 6th Principal Meridian in Dodge County, as defined by the Public Land Survey System (PLSS). On February 5, 1859, in Dodge County, he married (his second marriage) Elsina Canaga.

=== Jalapa Post Office ===
Jalapa P.O.
Jan. 18, 1859
————
Fremont, Omaha
and Fontenelle
Volunteer soldiers
assembled here
in Paunee War
July 5, 1859
————
Erected by
Dodge County
July 5, 1928
————————
(41.5561544°N 96.5410114°W).

The Jalapa Post Office was established January 18, 1859, at the home of Henry Clay Campbell, who served as its first Postmaster. It was discontinued on July 11, 1870, and its operations were transferred to the Hooper Post Office. The closure coincided with the arrival of the Union Pacific Railroad in the Platte Valley (Fremont and North Bend by 1867), when stage-served way stations were consolidated as postal routes shifted to the railroad.

The Jalapa Post Office was where, on July 5, 1859, the Omaha, Fontenelle, and Fremont Companies met and selected Captain William Kline – of 1st Company, Fontenelle Mounted Rifle Rangers – as their commander in what became known as the Pawnee War of 1859.

Campbell's home was torn down sometime before 1928 by Jacob Garman Shaffer, owner of what had been Campbell's land.

==== Postmasters ====
- Henry Clay Campbell, appointed January 18, 1859
- William Elias Wilson, appointed February 11, 1868
- Orlando Allen Himebaugh, appointed December 22, 1869

Campbell moved to Fontenelle around 1868 or 1869 and was appointed Deputy U.S. Marshall. Campbell later became warden Nebraska State Penitentiary. He died August 5, 1873, while serving as Warden.

There is a monument, "Jalapa P.O. – Jan. 18, 1858" — "Fremont, Omaha and Fontenelle Volunteer Soldiers Assembled Here In Paunee War, July 5, 1859" — "Erected by Dodge County, July 5, 1928".

==== Jalapa School House ====
The site of the Jalapa Post Office Monument is about a quarter mile north of what was the present Jalapa school house, on the east side of the road.

== Toponymy ==
The name "Jalapa" derives from the Nahuatl word Xalapan, composed of xālli ("sand") and āpan ("water place"), and is commonly interpreted as "sand by the water."

== Pawnee War of 1859 ==
The historical marker (see transcript at right) near the former site of Jalapa recalls that volunteer soldiers assembled there during what was known locally as the "Pawnee War" of 1859.

Despite the name, this was not a formal war but a brief frontier conflict sparked when a settler near Fontanelle, Uriah Thomas, reported that, on June 27, 1859, a group of Pawnee stole from him, money ($136; equivalent to $4,873 in 2025), land papers, and whiskey – and drove off a yoke of oxen (2 oxen). Rumors of widespread "marauding" quickly spread, with exaggerated reports that as many as 10,000 Pawnee were preparing retaliation. Governor Samuel Wylie Black (1816–1862) ordered militia companies to muster, and a volunteer expedition under Col. John Milton Thayer (1820–1906) (later governor of Nebraska) marched toward a large encampment of Pawnee, Omaha, and Ponca.

When confronted, Native leaders surrendered seven young Pawnees accused of theft to avoid escalation. An escape attempt led to several deaths and injuries among the prisoners, after which the militia dispersed. Contemporary settler accounts remembered the episode as the "Pawnee War," but later historians note that the Pawnees' relations with settlers and the U.S. government were generally more cooperative than hostile, and that the 1859 conflict was more a reflection of settler fears than a sustained military campaign.

== Notable people ==
- Reuben Gaylord (1812–1880), Congregational minister and one of the early missionary pioneers in the Nebraska Territory. After pastorates in Iowa and Omaha, he served from 1876 to 1880 as minister of the Congregational churches in Fontanelle and Jalapa, Nebraska. Gaylord has been described as a "father of Congregationalism in Nebraska."
- Fannie Brown Patrick (1864–1939), musician and women's suffragist, married Frank Goodwill Patrick (1854–1922) April 4, 1888, in Jalapa.

== Bibliography ==
=== References ===
- Abbott, Luther Jewett (1831–1900) (1887). Transactions and Reports of the Nebraska State Historical Society. "History of Dodge County". Vol. 2. Lincoln: State Journal Company, printers. pp. 257–274. LCCN 87-655756; OCLC 27027452, 729150238; OCLC 07535560 (all editions).
- Andreas, Alfred Theodore (1839–1900), ed. (1882). History of the State of Nebraska; Containing a Full Account of Its Growth From an Uninhabited Territory to a Wealthy and Important State; Of Its Early Settlements; Its Rapid Increase in Population, and the Marvellous Development of Its Great Natural Resources. Also an Extended Description of Its Counties, Cities, Towns and Villages, Their Advantages, Industries, Manufactures and Commerce; Biographical Sketches, Portraits of Prominent Men and Early Settlers; Views of Residences and Business Blocks, Cities and Towns. Illustrated. Compiled by Raymond E. Dale. Chicago: The Western Historical Company. Alfred Theodore Andreas, Proprietor – via Family Search. LCCN rc01-522; OCLC 1368270018, 33868689.
1. "Dodge County". pp. 630–677; → "Biographical Sketches". pp. 669–677; → "William E. Wilson". p. 670 (digital image no. 649).
2. "Douglas County". pp. 678–817; → "Biographical Sketches". pp. 754–817; → "Rev. Reuben Gaylord". p. 769 (digital image no. 748).
- Brown–Patrick Marriage, Jalapa, Nebraska, April 4, 1888 → Nebraska, U.S., Select County Marriage Records, 1855–1908 for Fannie W Brown; Dodge 1880–1889 (microfilmed by the Genealogical Society of Utah at the Nebraska State Historical Society by LDS Genealogical Missionaries Richard Owen Thornton (1933–2008) and wife, Agnes Marie Thornton (née Agnes Marie Johnson; 1931–2020); September 18, 1997. Film Emulsion No. 24339201. Film Unit Serial No. 2488. Project No. NEBR 02700. Roll No. 2). April 4, 1888. p. 391 of 574 (digital page 747 of 845) – via Ancestry.com.
1. Via Ancestry.com → "Fannie W. Brown".
2. Via Ancestry.com → "Frank G. Patrick".
3. Via FamilySearch → "Fannie W. Brown".
4. Via FamilySearch → "Frank G. Patrick".
Original record: Marriage Record – Dodge County. Vol. 5 (February 5, 1886 – February 20, 1889). Book printed by Herald Printing, Nebraska. p. 391 of 574.
- Bulletin of Yale University, Eighth General Catalogue of the Yale Divinity School, Centennial Issue 1822–1922. Nineteenth Series. New Haven: Published by the University. October 1, 1922. p. 51 "Students." "1839: Reuben Gaylord" – via Internet Archive (University of Illinois Urbana-Champaign).
- Buss, Rev. William Henry (1852–1926); Osterman, Thomas Theodore (1876–1931), eds. (1921). History of Dodge and Washington Counties, Nebraska and Their People. Retrieved June 5, 2024. OCLC 729491040 (all editions).
1. Vol 1 (Wisconsin Historical Society).
2. Vol 2 (Yale University).
- Burr, George L.; Buck, O[scar] O[thello], eds. (1921). History of Hamilton and Clay counties, Nebraska. "Pawnee War of 1859". Vol. 1. Compiled by Dale P[erry] Stough. Chicago: S.J. Clarke Publishing Company. pp. 42–43 – via Internet Archive (Allen County Public Library).
- Cook, Tom Kanatakeniate (May 23, 1976). "Pawnee War – More Sad Than Terrifying". Sunday Journal and Star. Vol. 106, no. 21. Lincoln, Nebraska. p. 1 (section B) – via Internet Archive.
- Cram, George Franklin (1841–1928) (1879) [©1878]. "Cram's Rail Road and Township Map of Nebraska" (Alphanumeric grid coordinates: R, 9). LCCN 98-688511; OCLC 43590038.
- Fannie Brown Patrick. Nevada Suffrage Centennial. Re: Fannie Brown Patrick (1864–1939) married Frank Goodwill Patrick (1854-1922) in 1888 in Jalapa, Nebraska.
- Gibson, Ron (né Ronald Dean Gibson; 1934–2002) (May 15, 1959). "Bovey Pen's 23rd Warden; Many Served Brief Terms". Lincoln Journal Star. Vol. 92, no. 116. p. 7 – via Newspapers.com. LCCN sn91-3329; OCLC 13300473 (all editions).
- Guide to the Union Pacific Railroad Lands – 12,000,000 Acres; Best Farming, Grazing and Mineral Lands in America, in the State of Nebraska and Territories of Colorado, Wyoming and Utah, for Sale by the Union Pacific Railroad Company, in Tracts To Suit Purchasers and at Low Prices (5th ed.). Omaha: Land Department: Union Pacific Railroad Building. Printed by the Omaha Herald Book and Office. 1872 – via Internet Archive Newberry Library. LCCN 07-1572; OCLC 9863829 (all editions)
1. "Description of Counties": "North Bend". pp. 34–48.
- Hooper Sentinel, The. Hooper, Nebraska. LCCN sn95-73347; OCLC 34006611 (all editions).
1. "Historical Monument to be Dedicated July 5". Vol. 44, no. 16. June 28, 1928. p. 1 (column 3) – via Newspapers.com.
2. "Biographical Sketches of 44 Years Ago – O.A. Himebaugh". Vol. 58, no. 54. Hooper, Nebraska. March 30, 1944. p. 8 (column 5, bottom) – via Newspapers.com.
- "Jalapa, Dodge, Nebraska". Appointments of U.S. Postmasters, 1832–1971 (NARA Microfilm Publication M841, NAID 596306 & 17027522. 1832 – September 30, 1971. Record Group 28: "Records of the Post Office Department". Roll Number 77 [of 145]. Washington, D.C.). 2010 – via Ancestry.com (National Archives Microfilm Publications).
1. "Jalapa P.O.: Campbell (appointed January 18, 1859). Vol. 21. Volume Year Range: 1855–1867. p. 243 (digital page 463 of 502).
2. "Jalapa P.O.: Campbell (appointed January 18, 1859). Vol. 33. Volume Year Range: 1867–1874. p. 1280 (digital page 465 of 502).
3. "Jalapa P.O.: Wilson (appointed February 11, 1868). Vol. 33. Volume Year Range: 1867–1874. p. 1280 (digital page 465 of 502).
4. "Jalapa P.O.: Himebaugh (appointed December 22, 1869). Vol. 33. Volume Year Range: 1867–1874. p. 1280 (digital page 465 of 502).
- Journal of the Senate: Journal of the Council at the First Regular Session of the General Assembly of the Territory of Nebraska, Begun and Held at Omaha City, Commencing on Tuesday the Sixteenth Day January, A.D. 1855, and Ending on the Sixteenth Day of March, A.D. 1855. Omaha: Sherman & Strickland, Printers. 1855. pp. 129, 130 – via Internet Archive (Library of Congress).
First Nebraska Territorial Legislature
Hiram Pitt Bennet (1826–1914), President Pro Tem
(Nebraska is the only state in the U.S. with a unicameral [one-house] legislature)
Tuesday, March 13, 1955. Morning Session:
1. "Mr. President – I am instructed to inform you that the House of Representatives has passed the following bills, in which the concurrence of the Council is respectfully requested: ..."
  1. "H[ouse] F[ile] No 164, An Act to Incorporate Jalapa City in Dodge County". p. 129.
2. "The following bills were taken up and severally disposed of as follows: ..."
  2. "H[ouse] F[ile] No 164, A Bill to Incorporate Jalapa City in Dodge County". p. 130.
- Journal of the House: Journal of the House of Representatives, of the First Regular Session of the General Assembly of the Territory of Nebraska, Begun and Held at Omaha City, Commencing on Tuesday the Sixteenth Day of January, A.D. 1855, and Ending on the Seventeenth Day of March, A.D. 1855. Omaha: Sherman & Strickland, Printers. 1855. pp. 125, 130 – via Internet Archive (Library of Congress).
First Nebraska Territorial Legislature
1. Thursday, March 15, 1955. "Afternoon Session".
  "Message from the Council.
  Mr. Speaker: — I am directed to inform you that the Council have passed the following bills, iu which the concurrence of the House is respectfully requested. ..."
  1. "H[ouse] F[ile] No 164, An Act to Incorporate Jalapa City, in Dodge County". p. 125.
    G[eorge] L[aForest] Miller, Chief Clerk
2. Friday, March 16, 1855: "Afternoon Session".
  "Message From the Executive by His Private Secretary, Mr. [Mark Whitaker] Izard:"
  "Mr. Speaker — I am instructed by the Governor to inform your honorable body that he has approved and signed the following bills, viz:"
  2. "H[ouse] F[ile] No 164, entitled an Act to Incorporate Jalapa City". p. 130.
- Karttunen, Frances (1992) [©1983 University of Texas Press]. An Analytical Dictionary of Nahuatl. University of Oklahoma Press. LCCN 91-50855; ISBN 978-0-8061-2421-6.
1. "Xāl-li" (sand). p. 22 – via Google Books (limited preview).
2. "Āpan-tli" (glossed as sand / sandstone, from xālli.). p. 11 – via Google Books (limited preview).
- "Map of the State of Nebraska Showing the Lands of the Burlington & Missouri Riv. R.R. Co. in Nebraska" (Alphanumeric grid coordinates: R, 9). New York: G.W. & C.B. Colton & Co. → Joseph Hutchins Colton (1800–1893). Sons: George Woolworth Colton (1827–1901) and Charles Burnham Colton (1832–1916). 1876. LCCN 98-688604; OCLC 860942231.
  Re: Burlington and Missouri River Railroad
- Marquette, David (1842–1911) (1904). A History of Nebraska Methodism, First Half-Century, 1854–1904. Cincinnati: The Western Methodist Book Concern Press – via Internet Archive (Princeton Theological Seminary). LCCN 05-27435; OCLC 7658622 (all editions).
- Official State Atlas of Nebraska – Compiled From Government Surveys, County Records, and Personal Investigations. "Dodge County". Philadelphia: Everts & Kirk → Louis Humphrey Everts (Brevet Major, Union Army; 1836–1924) & William H. Kirk. 1885. p. 78. Retrieved June 6, 2024. LCCN 2020-585793; OCLC 953569527 (all editions).
1. Via host website (David Rumsey Historical Map Collection).
2. Via HathiTrust (Cornell. 1927 reproduction by the Eastern Nebraska Genealogical Society).
3. Via Google Books (Cornell. 1927 reproduction by the Eastern Nebraska Genealogical Society).
- Partridge, Eric Honeywood (1894–1979) (1961). A Charm of Words: Essays and Papers on Language (1st ed.). New York: The MacMillan Company. p. 171 – via Internet Archive (Allegheny College: Withdrawn). LCCN 61-1249 (1960; London: Hamish Hamilton), LCCN 61-4951 (1961); OCLC 1557694 (all editions).
- Reckmeyer, Clarence (né Clarence Emery Reckmeyer; 1876–1955) (October 18, 1927). "Locates Site of Jalapa Post Office in Dodge County". The Fremont Herald. Vol. 56, no. 19. Fremont, Nebraska. pp. 1 & 8 – via Newspapers.com. LCCN sn94-61473; OCLC 31773203 (all editions).
- Reckmeyer, Clarence (né Clarence Emery Reckmeyer; 1876–1955) (March 5, 1931). "An Historical Sketch About Robinson Mill On Maple Creek". Hooper Sentinel, The. Vol. 46, no. 50. Hooper, Nebraska. p. 6 – via Newspapers.com. LCCN sn95-73347; OCLC 34006611 (all editions).
- Register of Officers and Agents, Civil, Military, and Naval, in the Service of the United States on ... "Post Offices in Iowa" ("Biennial Registers", commonly called "Blue Books"). Government Printing Office. Retrieved May 19, 2024 – via Google Books. LCCN sn91-34227.
1. 1862 (Michigan). p. 442. OCLC 476664625.
2. 1864 (Chicago). p. 699. OCLC 317697533.
3. 1866 (Princeton). p. 416. OCLC 835780759.
4. 1868 (Cornell). p. 515. OCLC 835780759.
5. 1870 (Minnesota). p. 518. OCLC 835780796.
- Scoville (1892). History of the Elkhorn Valley, Nebraska: An Album of History and Biography Containing a Descriptive, Political, Statistical, Financial, Commercial, Agricultural, Educational, Religious and Biographical History and Reminiscences. Compiled under the supervision of C. H. Scoville. Chicago and Omaha: National Publishing Company – via FamilySearch. (see C.H. Scoville Papers, Nebraska State Historical Society).
- Sorenson, Alfred Rasmus (1876). Early History of Omaha; Or, Walks and Talks Among the Old Settlers: A Series of Sketches in the Shape of a Connected Narrative of the Events and Incidents of Early Times in Omaha; Together With a Brief Mention of the Most Important Events of Later Years. Chapter 10: "The Pawnee War". Illustrated with numerous engravings, many of them being from original sketches drawn especially for this work by Charles S[mith] Huntington [1853–1925]. Omaha: Printed at the Office of the Daily Bee. pp. 142–160. LCCN rc01-61; OCLC 6001396 (all editions).
1. Via Wikimedia Commons (UCLA; California Digital Library).
2. Via Internet Archive (UCLA; California Digital Library).
3. Via Google Books (Wisconsin Historical Society; University of Wisconsin–Madison).
- Village Record (January 3, 1854). "From Washington" (Territories of the United States). Vol. 35, whole no. 1902. West Chester, Pennsylvania. p. 2 (column 6, top) – via Newspapers.com. LCCN sn85-54088; OCLC 11661295.
