= Reuben Gaylord =

Leader of the missionary pioneers in the Nebraska Territory (1812-1880)

- Born: April 28, 1812; Norfolk, Connecticut, US
- Died: January 10, 1880 (aged 67); Fontanelle, Nebraska, US
- Resting place: Prospect Hill Cemetery (North Omaha, Nebraska)
- Education: Yale University
- Occupation: Minister
- Employer: Congregationalist Church
- Spouse(s): Sarah Burton; Mary N. Welles
- Children: 5

Reuben Gaylord (April 28, 1812 – January 10, 1880) was the recognized leader of the missionary pioneers in the Nebraska Territory, and has been called the "father of Congregationalism in Nebraska." Writing in memory of Gaylord in the early 1900s, fellow Omaha pioneer George L. Miller said, "It was Reuben Gaylord, the brave Christian soldier who brought Sunday into Omaha and the Trans-Missouri country.

== Biography ==
=== Early life ===
Born in Norfolk, Connecticut, Reuben Curtis Gaylord was one of eight children of Reuben Gaylord and Mary Curtis who were of Congregational heritage. Gaylord committed himself to Christianity when he was fourteen years old. He attended Yale University in 1830 and graduated in 1834, when delivered the graduating oration. After he graduated Gaylord worked at the Illinois College in Jacksonville, Illinois. There he taught and studied theology with Dr. Edward Beecher, president of the college and a son of Dr. Lyman Beecher, Yale 1797. In 1837 he returned to Yale Theological Seminary and graduated in 1838.

Gaylord belonged to a band of pioneer ministers well known in the history of Congregationalism who came west after they graduated from the Yale Divinity School in 1838 to established churches in Iowa. He was ordained at Plymouth, Connecticut in August 1839. His first daughter was born on October 13, 1839. His 23-year-old wife died on September 23, 1840.

=== Career ===
Soon after graduation Gaylord was commissioned by the American Home Missionary Society of Yale College to work in Henry County, Iowa. He was the second Congregational minister in that state, preaching at the Mount Pleasant and Danville, Iowa churches, and eventually became the permanent minister at the Danville Congregational Church. While there he became a founding member of the board of trustees of Iowa College at Grinnell, now known as Grinnell College.

O. D. Richardson, former governor of Michigan and Congregationalist, invited Gaylord to come and work in Omaha, Nebraska. He first came in September 1855. Moving his family there on Christmas Day, 1855, Gaylord preached his sermons in the Nebraska State House in Omaha, which was the only place in Omaha available.

On May 4, 1856, Gaylord organized the First Congregational Church of Omaha with nine members. A building was completed in August 1857. Later he organized the Congregational Church in Fontanelle, Florence and Fort Calhoun. He also played a key role in establishing the first Nebraska University in Fontanelle.

In 1864 he was appointed agent for the American Home Missionary Society for western Iowa and the entirety of Nebraska. He accepted this appointment and resigned from the church in Omaha, working there until 1871. Afterwards he returned to Omaha, regularly preaching in La Platte, Papillion, Columbus, and other places. In 1875, he returned to Fontanelle as the minister, and preached at the church in Jalapa as well. Gaylord died suddenly in the town of Fontanelle in 1880.

=== Family ===
Gaylord's first wife was Sarah Burton, whom he was married to in 1838; she died two years later. They had one child. In 1841 Reuben married Mary N. Welles, a direct descendant of Thomas Welles, the Fourth Colonial Governor of Connecticut. Reuben and Mary were the parents of four children.

== See also ==
- History of Omaha

== Bibliography ==
=== References ===
- Andreas, Alfred Theodore, ed. (1882). History of the State of Nebraska; Containing a Full Account of Its Growth From an Uninhabited Territory to a Wealthy and Important State; Of Its Early Settlements; Its Rapid Increase in Population, and the Marvellous Development of Its Great Natural Resources. Also an Extended Description of Its Counties, Cities, Towns and Villages, Their Advantages, Industries, Manufactures and Commerce; Biographical Sketches, Portraits of Prominent Men and Early Settlers; Views of Residences and Business Blocks, Cities and Towns. Illustrated. Compiled by Raymond E. Dale. Chicago: The Western Historical Company. Alfred Theodore Andreas, Proprietor – via Family Search. LCCN rc01-522; OCLC 1368270018, 33868689.
1. "Douglas County". pp. 678–817; → "Biographical Sketches". pp. 754–817; → "Rev. Reuben Gaylord". p. 769 (digital image no. 748).
- Bulletin of Yale University, Eighth General Catalogue of the Yale Divinity School, Centennial Issue 1822–1922. Nineteenth Series. New Haven: Published by the University. October 1, 1922. p. 51 "Students." "1839: Reuben Gaylord" – via Internet Archive (University of Illinois Urbana-Champaign).
- Punchard, George. History of Congregationalism From About A.D. 250 to the Present Time (2nd ed.).
1. Vol. 1: "In Continuation of the Account of the Origin and Earliest History of This System of Church Polity Contained in 'A View of Congregationalism' ".
  New York: Hurd and Houghton.
  Boston: E.P. Dutton and Company.
  1. Vol. 1. New York, Hurd and Houghton. 1865 – via Internet Archive (University of Michigan).
  2. Vol. 2. New York, Hurd and Houghton. 1865 – via Internet Archive (Oxford).
  New York: Hurd and Houghton.
  3. Vol. 3. Hurd and Houghton. 1867 – via Internet Archive (Harvard).
2. Vol. 2: "Congregationalism in America".
  Boston: Congregational Publishing Society
  4. Vol. 4: "New England, Virginia, Maryland, the Southern Islands, Long Island, New Jersey, North Carolina, South Carolina, Georgia, and Canada". Boston, Congregational Pub. Co. 1880 – via Internet Archive (Harvard).
  5. Vol. 5: "New York, Pennsylvania, the Southern and Southwestern States, the Old West, the New West, Resume of History, Revivals, the Unitarian Controversy". 1881 – via Internet Archive (Harvard).
    - Chapter 9: "Kansas and Nebraska". pp. 341–369. 1865. p. 360 – via Internet Archive (Harvard).
- Evans Reeves, Winona, ed. (1916). The Blue Book of Nebraska Women – A History of Contemporary Women. Mexico, Missouri: Missouri Printing and Publishing Company. Retrieved May 27, 2024.. OCLC 10405591 (all editions).
1. "Mrs. S.E. Brewster". p. 17 – via Google Books (Wisconsin Historical Society)..
