= National Register of Historic Places listings in Washington County, Nebraska =

Location of Washington County in Nebraska

Washington County, Nebraska, United States, has 16 properties and districts listed on the National Register of Historic Places, including one National Historic Landmark. There are also two former listings.

The locations of National Register properties and districts for which the latitude and longitude coordinates are included below may be seen in a map.

This National Park Service list is complete through NPS recent listings posted October 30, 2026.

== Current listings ==
	Name on the Register	Image	Date listed	Location	City or town	Description
1	Bertrand Site	Bertrand Site	March 24, 1969 (#69000138)	DeSoto National Wildlife Refuge; 41°31′24″N 96°01′44″W	Blair	
2	Blair High School	Blair High School	March 14, 1991 (#91000300)	Junction of 16th and Colfax Sts. 41°32′24″N 96°08′10″W	Blair	
3	Abraham Castetter House	Abraham Castetter House	June 25, 1982 (#82003203)	1815 Grant St. 41°32′30″N 96°08′23″W	Blair	
4	Congregational Church of Blair	Congregational Church of Blair	February 1, 1979 (#79001457)	16th and Colfax Sts. 41°32′28″N 96°08′11″W	Blair	
5	C.C. Crowell, Jr. House	C.C. Crowell, Jr. House	July 19, 1982 (#82003204)	2138 Washington St. 41°32′39″N 96°08′42″W	Blair	
6	Dana College Campus	Dana College Campus	August 3, 2021 (#100006792)	2848 College Dr. 41°33′06″N 96°09′23″W	Blair	
7	Engineer Cantonment	Engineer Cantonment	November 17, 2015 (#15000795)	Address restricted	Fort Calhoun	
8	Fontanelle Township Hall	Fontanelle Township Hall	September 9, 1982 (#82003205)	10976 8th Street; 41°32′15″N 96°25′40″W	Fontanelle	
9	Fort Atkinson	Fort Atkinson	October 15, 1966 (#66000454)	1 mile east of Fort Calhoun; 41°27′23″N 96°00′49″W	Fort Calhoun	
10	Alfred H. and Sarah Frahm House	Alfred H. and Sarah Frahm House	March 2, 2006 (#06000101)	220 S. 15th St. 41°27′14″N 96°01′41″W	Fort Calhoun	
11	Gottsch Farmstead	Gottsch Farmstead	August 8, 2016 (#16000516)	17201 Dutch Hall Rd. 41°23′36″N 96°11′02″W	Bennington	
12	Long Creek School	Long Creek School	February 23, 2001 (#01000167)	Long Creek Lane; 41°27′33″N 96°05′15″W	Blair	
13	George A. Marshall House	George A. Marshall House	November 5, 2018 (#100003096)	301 N 8th St. 41°27′09″N 96°21′28″W	Arlington	
14	Old McDonald Farm	Old McDonald Farm	July 5, 2001 (#01000714)	2 miles (3.2 km) south of Blair above Mill Creek; 41°30′01″N 96°08′00″W	Blair	
15	Frank Parker Archeological Site		March 4, 2009 (#09000069)	Address restricted	Fort Calhoun	Extends into Douglas County
16	Washington County Courthouse	Washington County Courthouse	January 10, 1990 (#89002221)	16th St. between Colfax and South Sts. 41°32′24″N 96°08′06″W	Blair	

== Former listings ==
	Name on the Register	Image	Date listed	Date removed	Location	City or town	Description
1	Crowell Mansion		November 12, 1971 (#71001085)	November 19, 1971	245 S. 22nd St. 33°26′41″N 112°03′54″W	Blair	Demolished in November 1971.
2	Trinity Seminary Building		July 3, 1980 (#80004528)	February 18, 2021	College Dr. 41°33′02″N 96°08′39″W	Blair	Also known as Old Main. Destroyed by fire on August 25, 1988

== See also ==
- Washington County Historical Association
- List of National Historic Landmarks in Nebraska
- National Register of Historic Places listings in Nebraska
