= Township 7, Washington County, Nebraska =

Township in Nebraska, US

Coordinates: 41°26′14″N 96°15′27″W

Township 7 is one of five townships in Washington County, Nebraska, United States. The population was 2,562 at the 2000 census. A 2006 estimate placed the township's population at 2,701.

The villages of Arlington, Washington, and a portion of Kennard lie within the Township.

== See also ==
- County government in Nebraska
