= Crowell House =

Crowell House may refer to several houses in the United States:

Alphabetical by state, then town

- Crowell House (Denver, Colorado), on the list of the oldest buildings in Colorado
- C. C. Crowell House, Somerville, Massachusetts, listed on the US National Register of Historic Places (NRHP)
- Crowell–Bourne Farm, West Falmouth, Massachusetts, NRHP-listed
- C.C. Crowell Jr. House, Blair, Nebraska, NRHP-listed
- Crowell House (Sea Cliff, New York), NRHP-listed
- J. B. Crowell and Son Brick Mould Mill Complex, Wallkill, New York, NRHP-listed
- Crowell House (Durham, North Carolina), NRHP-listed
- Warren-Crowell House, Terrell, Texas, NRHP-listed
