= Nashville, Nebraska =

Unincorporated community in Nebraska, United States

- Location within the state of Nebraska
- Coordinates: 41°24′23″N 95°59′47″W
- Country: United States
- State: Nebraska
- County: Washington
- Elevation: 1,099 ft (335 m)
- GNIS feature ID: 831564

Nashville is an unincorporated community in Washington County, Nebraska, United States.

== History ==
A post office was established at Nashville in 1923, and remained in operation until it was discontinued in 1929. In November 2008 a manufacturing plant located in Nashville, PK Manufacturing, was destroyed in a large fire caused by arson in an insurance fraud scheme.

As a result of a wave severe weather that impacted eastern Nebraska and western Iowa, a tornado damaged some parts of Nashville on April 17, 2025, including two houses that were destroyed.

== Geography ==
Nashville is located at 41°24′23″N 95°59′47″W (41.406388, -95.996388), just north of Omaha along U.S. Route 75. It is approximately four miles south of Fort Calhoun.

== See also ==
- Washington County Historical Association
