= Township 6 =

Township 6 can refer to:

- Holly Springs Township, Wake County, North Carolina
- Township 6, Benton County, Arkansas
- Township 6, Harper County, Kansas
- Township 6, Rooks County, Kansas
- Township 6, Washington County, Nebraska
