= First Nebraska Territorial Legislature =

Group that provided leadership for the Nebraska territory

The First Nebraska Territorial Legislature first met in Omaha, Nebraska, on January 15, 1855. The Council Bluffs and Nebraska Ferry Company provided the first meeting place, which was a building "constructed for public purposes". Standing out from the estimated twenty shacks in the young town, it was the first brick building in Omaha, which was founded the year before when the Nebraska Territory was created. Responsible for several important decisions that laid an important foundation for the future statehood for Nebraska, the Nebraska Territorial Legislature made controversial decisions and provided leadership for the territory.

== Issues ==
The first legislature, along with several subsequent gatherings, drew criticism for a perceived lack of representation of the population south of the Platte River. Legislators from south of the Platte wore red blankets over their shoulders in the first session to indicate their hostility towards the northern legislators.

Although the then current Omaha capitol building, built in 1857-58, was apparently sturdy enough to house legislative sessions for several years and was well located in relation to Nebraska's 1867 population, it was still north of the Platte. Forces from the south launched a major verbal and legal initiative to move the seat of government to their part of the state. The first Legislature was also responsible for chartering Nebraska University in Washington County. Slavery in Nebraska was a topic of the first legislature, where members were largely influenced by events in neighboring Kansas. The first legislature considered an exclusion measure designed to keep former slaves from the territory. After the bill was postponed the issue continued to be raised, ultimately delaying statehood.

== Members ==
Few of the members had actually spent more than a night in the districts they represented, and most ferried to Council Bluffs, Iowa, at the end of each day for rest. The new territorial governor, Mark W. Izard, was successful at persuading members to adopt Iowa's legislative rules. Omaha members bribed other legislators to keep the capitol in Omaha by offering them lots in their new city. This land, which now wraps around the north and west ends of Downtown Omaha, was called Scriptown.

Although not a member, Reverend William D. Gage, a Methodist minister, served as the chaplain, and later the legislature returned the favor by naming Gage County after him. Joseph W. Paddock, who had immigrated to the territory from New York in 1854, served as the chief clerk.

Members of the First Nebraska Territorial Legislature incomplete
Name	Dates of service	Occupation	Representing	Notes
William Byers				
Alfred D. Jones				
Samuel Maxwell				
Origen D. Richardson				
Robert W. Furnas	1856-			
Turner M. Marquette	1857–1859			
Stephen Friel				
Lafayette Nuckolls				
Samuel Hitt Elbert	1860-			
Henry Walter DePuy				
William Byers				
George L. Miller	1855-1856			

== See also ==
- Pioneer history of Omaha
