= Alfred H. and Sarah Frahm House =

- U.S. National Register of Historic Places
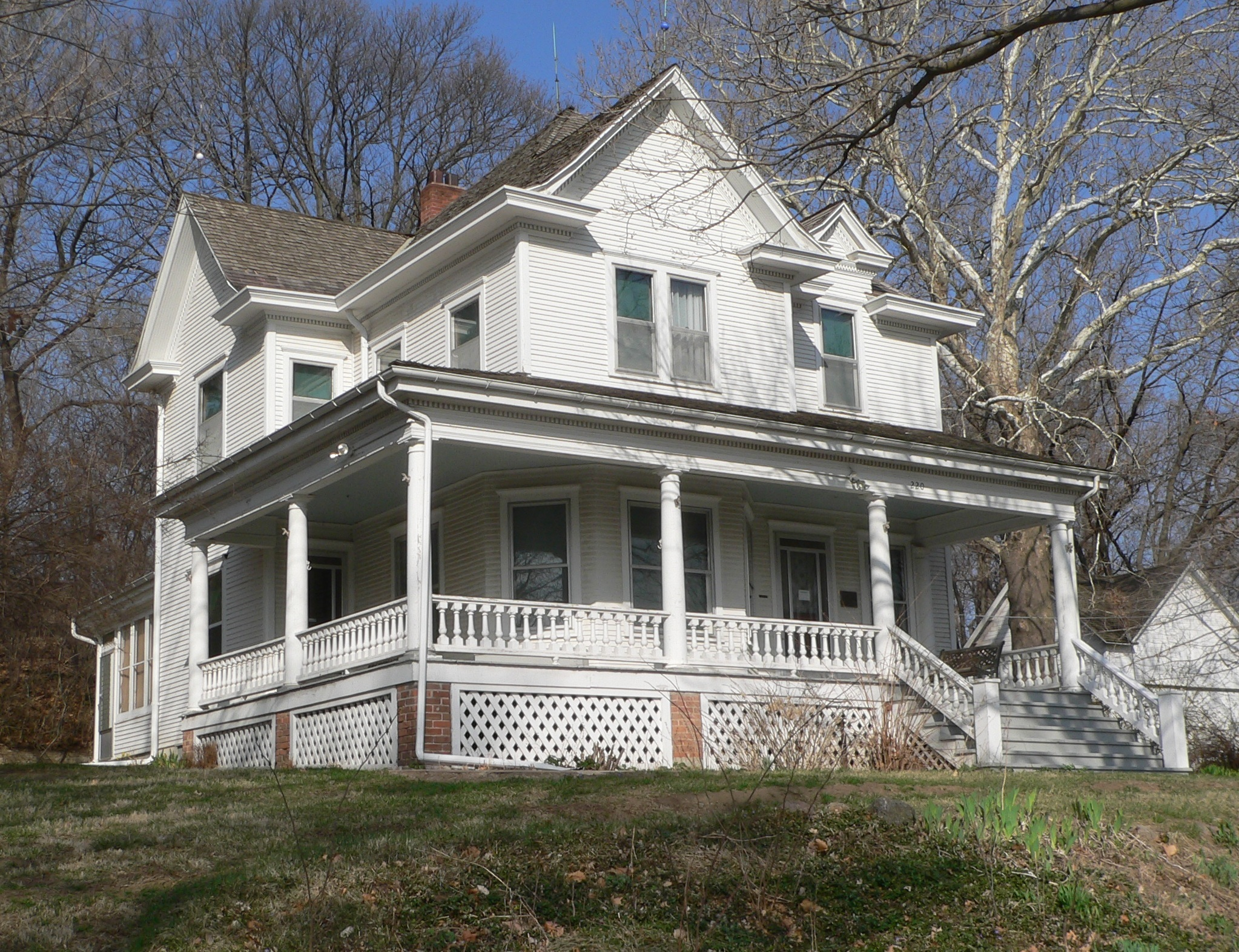
- The house in 2012

- Location within Nebraska Location within the United States
- Location: 220 South 15th Street, Fort Calhoun, Nebraska
- Coordinates: 41°27′14″N 96°01′40″W
- Area: 2 acres (0.81 ha)
- Built: 1905
- Architect: Fisher and Lawrie
- Architectural style: Colonial Revival
- NRHP reference No.: 06000101
- Added to NRHP: March 2, 2006

The Alfred H. and Sarah Frahm House is a historic house in Fort Calhoun, Nebraska. It was built in 1905 for Alfred H. Frahm, who lived here with his wife, née Sarah Case Beales, and their daughter, Catharine Comly Frahm. It was designed in the Classical Revival style by Fisher and Lawrie, an architectural firm based in Omaha. When Catherine Comly Frahm died in 1994, the house was conveyed to the Washington County Historical Association. It has been listed on the National Register of Historic Places since March 2, 2006.
