= Patrick Ranch House =

Patrick Ranch House may refer to:

- Patrick Ranch House (Chico, California), listed on the National Register of Historic Places in Butte County, California
- Patrick Rancheria, Chico, California, listed on the National Register of Historic Places listings in Butte County, California
- Patrick Ranch House (Reno, Nevada), listed on the National Register of Historic Places in Washoe County, Nevada
