= Township 1, Washington County, Nebraska =

Township in Nebraska, US

Coordinates: 41°26′05″N 96°01′34″W

Township 1 is one of five townships in Washington County, Nebraska, United States. The population was 3,464 at the 2000 census. A 2006 estimate placed the township's population at 3,696.

The city of Fort Calhoun lies within the township.

== See also ==
- County government in Nebraska
