= Township 5 =

Township 5 can refer to:

- Cedar Fork Township, Wake County, North Carolina
- Township 5, Benton County, Arkansas
- Township 5, Harper County, Kansas
- Township 5, Rooks County, Kansas
- Township 5, Washington County, Nebraska
