= Nickerson Township =

Nickerson Township may refer to one of the following places in the United States:

- Nickerson Township, Pine County, Minnesota
- Nickerson Township, Dodge County, Nebraska
