= Township 2, Washington County, Nebraska =

Township in Nebraska, US

Coordinates: 41°29′17″N 96°06′10″W

Township 2 is one of five townships in Washington County, Nebraska, United States. The population was 2,338 at the 2000 census. A 2006 estimate placed the township's population at 2,473.

A portion of the village of Kennard lies within the Township.

== See also ==
- County government in Nebraska
