= Washington County Historical Association =

Historical society in Nebraska, United States

The Washington County Historical Association, or WCHA, is located in the Washington County Historical Museum at 102 North 14th Street in Fort Calhoun, Nebraska. The WCHA "promotes careful guardianship of historical artifacts, promotes an understanding of their significance and inspires people to turn things learned and appreciated into benchmarks for their lives."

== Washington County Historical Museum ==
Julie Ashton is the executive director and Faith Norwood is the museum curator. The Washington County Historical Museum is the oldest county museum in Nebraska. The museum houses artifacts from throughout the area's history, including local Native American tribes and nearby Fort Atkinson. There are also items from early settlers, and genealogical information. Other properties owned by the WCHS include the Frahm House, located at 15th and Madison Streets in Fort Calhoun, and the Fontanelle Township Hall in Fontanelle, which is in the western part of Washington County.

== See also ==
- National Register of Historic Places listings in Washington County, Nebraska
- History of Omaha
- History of Nebraska
