= Telbasta, Nebraska =

Unincorporated community in Nebraska, U.S.

Coordinates: 41°34′54″N 96°23′10″W

Telbasta is an unincorporated community in Washington County, Nebraska, United States.

== History ==
A post office was established at Telbasta in 1890 and remained in operation until it was discontinued in 1900.
