= Abraham Castetter House =

- U.S. National Register of Historic Places
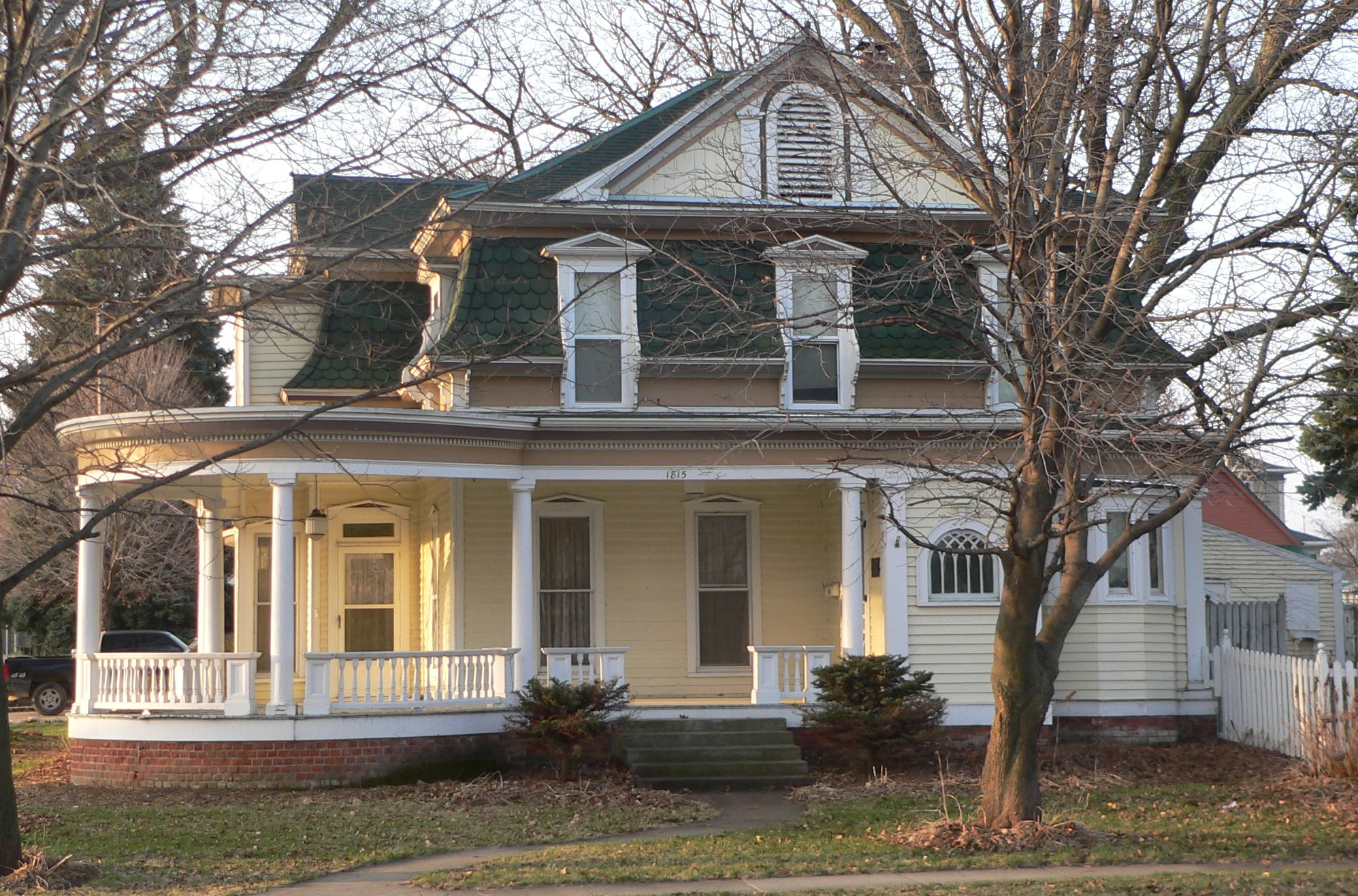
- The house in 2012

- Location within Nebraska Location within the United States
- Location: 1815 Grant Street, Blair, Nebraska
- Coordinates: 41°32′30″N 96°08′21″W
- Area: less than one acre
- Built: 1876
- Architectural style: Second Empire, Eclecticism
- NRHP reference No.: 82003203
- Added to NRHP: June 25, 1982

The Abraham Castetter House is a historic house in Blair, Nebraska. It was built in 1876 for Abraham Castetter, who served as Washington County's county clerk and later founded The Banking House of A. Castetter. The house was designed in the Second Empire and Eclectic architectural styles. It has been listed on the National Register of Historic Places since June 25, 1982.
