= St. Martin of Tours Episcopal Church =

Historic church in Nebraska, United States

- U.S. National Register of Historic Places
- Omaha Landmark
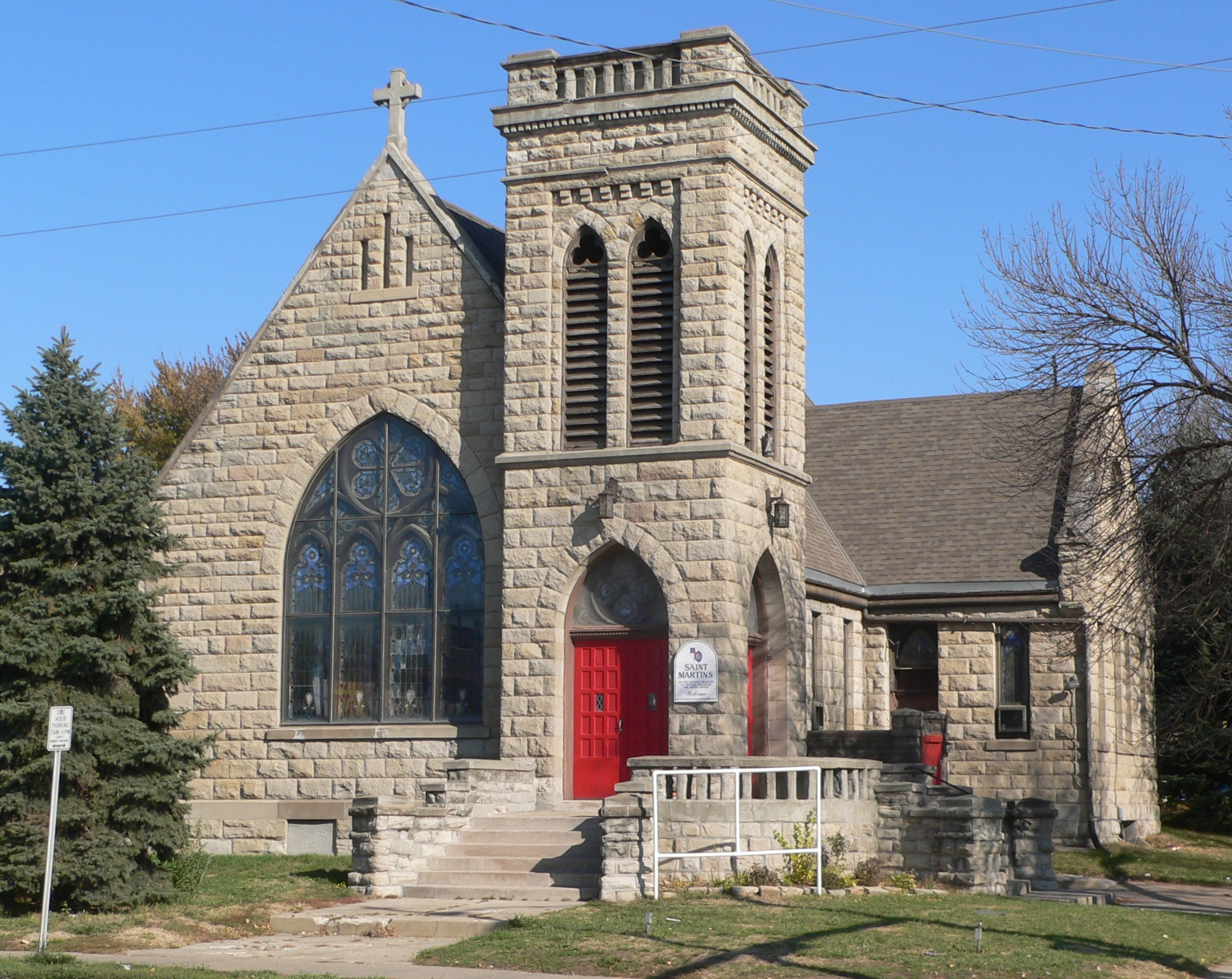
- View from the southwest, across 24th Street

- Location within Nebraska Location within the United States
- Location: 2312 J St., Omaha, Nebraska
- Coordinates: 41°12′53.75″N 95°56′47.9″W
- Built: 1899
- Architectural style: Late Gothic Revival
- NRHP reference No.: 82000608

Significant dates
- Added to NRHP: October 21, 1982
- Designated OMAL: March 16, 1982

St. Martin of Tours Episcopal Church is a historic stone Episcopal church building located at 2312 J Street in the South Omaha district of Omaha, Nebraska. Built in 1899 in the Late Gothic Revival style, it was designated an Omaha Landmark and listed on the National Register of Historic Places in 1982. It was the first Episcopal church established in South Omaha when the town was being developed. It is the only surviving Episcopal church in this community, which was settled chiefly by Roman Catholic immigrants.

The church is part of the Episcopal Diocese of Nebraska.

In 2015, the church reported 25 members; in 2023, it reported 38 members. No membership statistics were reported in 2024 national parochial reports. Plate and pledge financial support reported by the church in 2024 was $38,260. Average Sunday Attendance (ASA) reported in 2024 was 26 persons. This was a relative increase from ASA of 16 reported in 2015.

== History ==
The Very Reverend Frank Millspaugh, dean of Trinity Cathedral, founded St. Martin's Church in 1876. Millspaugh and his successor George Worthington founded most of the Episcopal churches in Omaha. St. Martin was the first Episcopal church built when the former independent town of South Omaha was new.

The church's architecture was influenced by the Oxford Movement, which revived elements of historical Christian church styles and worship of the Middle Ages. The limestone for the church was salvaged from the remains of the Ralston mansion of Dr. George L. Miller, which burned down in the late 1880s.

As South Omaha developed rapidly, attracting many waves of immigrants from Eastern and Southern Europe, the Episcopal Church established new missions in the area. But, most of the immigrants were Catholic and established their own churches to continue their traditions. St. Martin of Tours is the only Episcopal church remaining in this area of Omaha.

== See also ==
- Omaha Landmarks
