= Orum, Nebraska =

Unincorporated community in Nebraska, U.S.

Coordinates: 41°32′45″N 96°16′14″W

Orum is an unincorporated community in Washington County, Nebraska, United States.

== History ==
A post office was established at Orum in 1890, and remained in operation until it was discontinued in 1902.
