= Fannie Brown Patrick =

People from Fairfield, Iowa

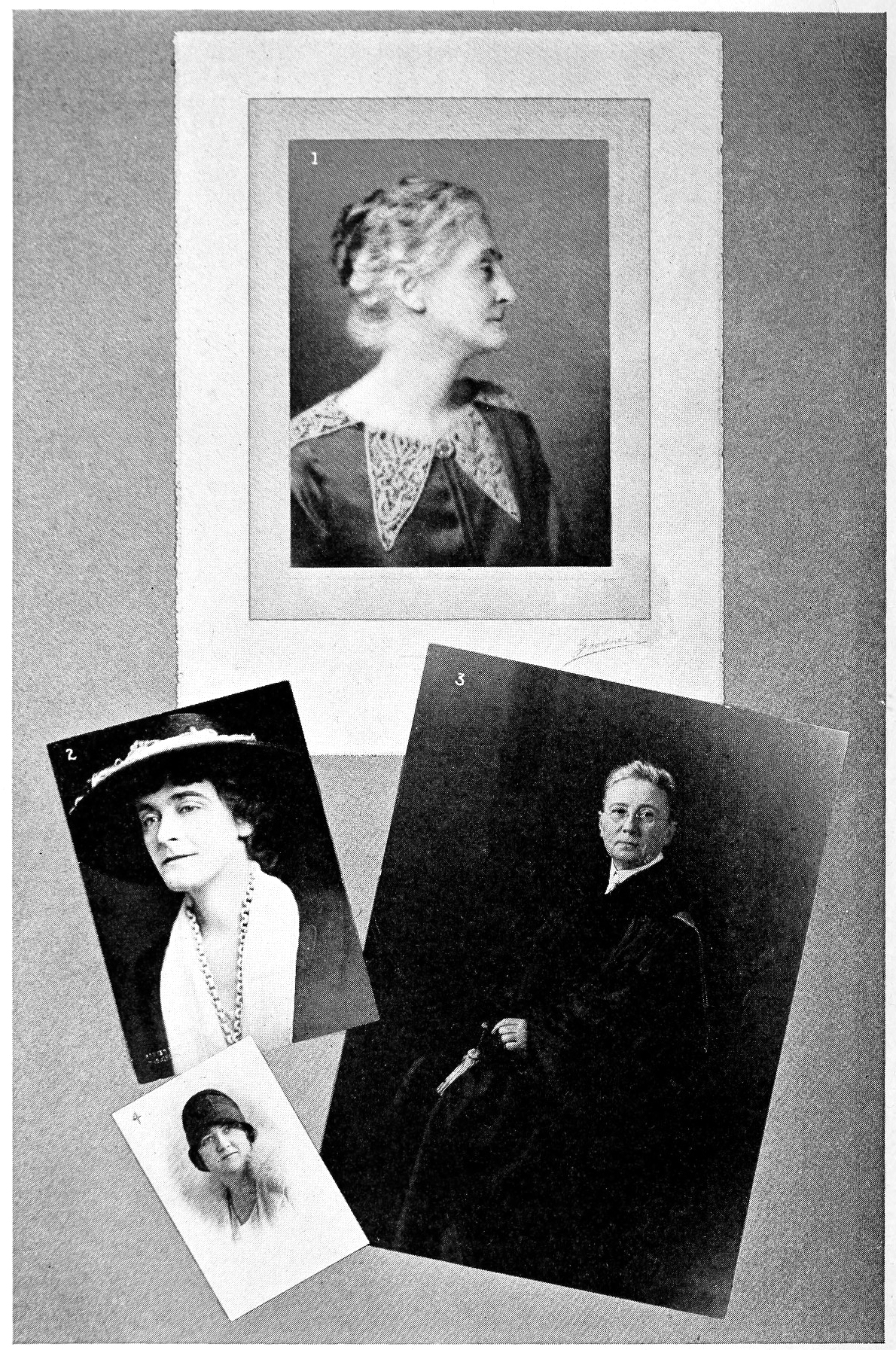
1) Fannie Brown Patrick, 2) Anne Jennings Kluegel, 3) Clelia G. Mosher, 4) Mrs. B.F. Chappelle

Fannie Brown Patrick (née Fannie Washington Brown; August 29, 1864 – October 8, 1939) was a musician and leader in civic and social affairs.

== Early life ==
Fannie Brown was born in Fairfield, Iowa, on August 29, 1864, the daughter of Isaac Harrington Brown (1822–1901) and Sarah Ellen Fee (1826–1901). She had eleven siblings – five sisters, including Maude Prudence Brown Harrington (1817–1918), and six brothers, including Fred Porter Brown (1867–1950).

Fannie Brown Patrick lived at Fremont and Wood River, Nebraska, then, in 1902, moved to Reno.

== Career ==
Fannie Brown Patrick was a music teacher and one of the organizers of the Nevada Musical Club and acted on several occasions as chairman of music week.

She was active in civic work: she was the chairman of the Council of Education of the YWCA; she was past president of the State Federation of Women's Clubs of Nevada; she was trustee and secretary of Southside Irrigating Canal Co.

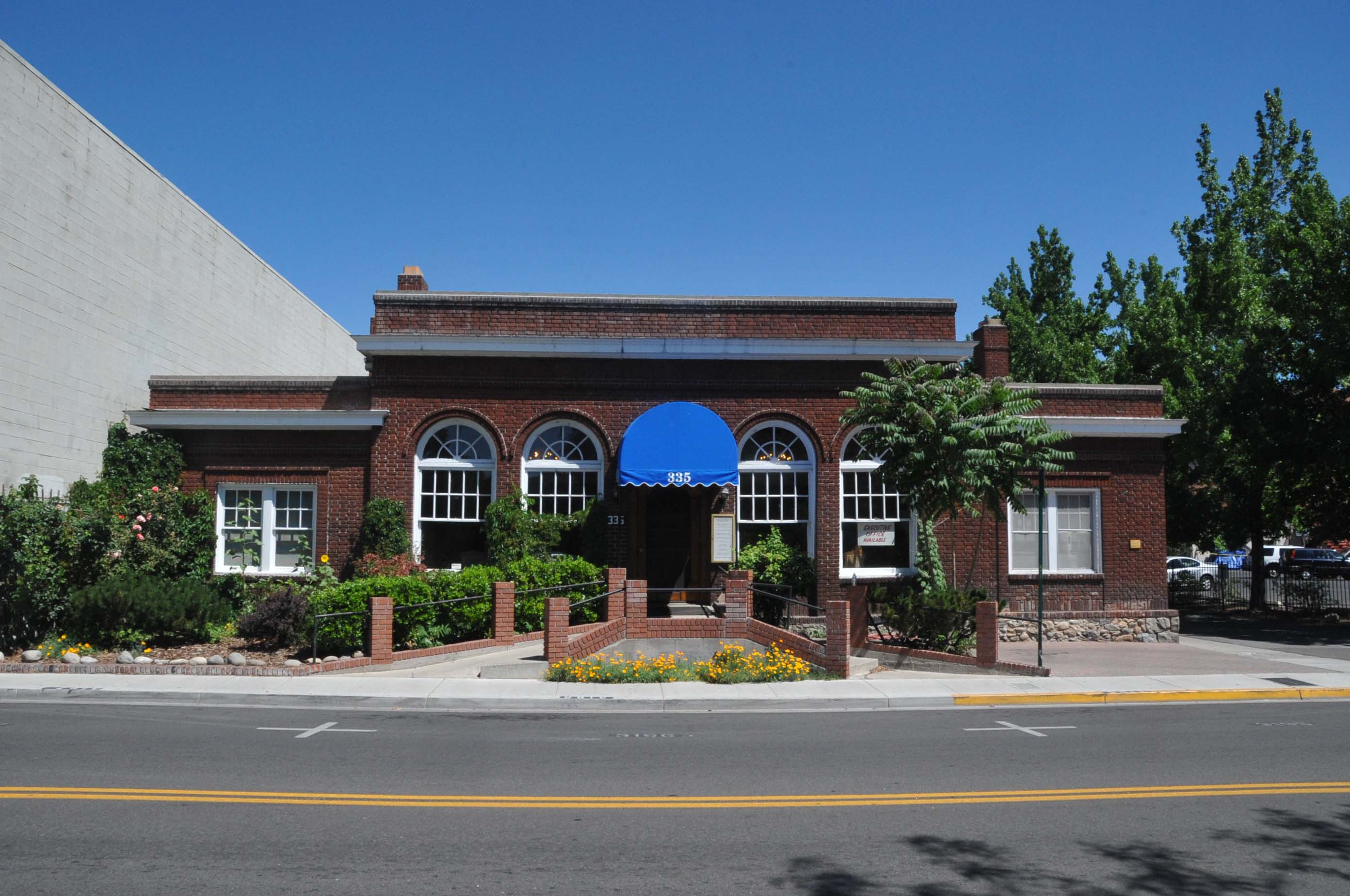
Twentieth Century Club

Patrick was a charter member of the Twentieth Century Club (for which she served several time as secretary and was the club parliamentarian for 20 years) and the State Farm Bureau, and was president of the Hillcrest Chapter of Delphian Society.

She was instrumental in founding a number of Reno institutions. Prominent in politics of the State, Patrick was active for many years in affairs of the Democratic party and she was member of the National Committee woman of the Nevada Democratic Party.

Patrick was a member of the Daughters of the American Revolution, the Trinity Episcopal Cathedral and the Guild Society and other groups.

She was prominent in the women's suffrage movement in Nevada.

== Patrick Ranch ==
With her husband, she operated the Patrick Ranch near the south city limits of Reno; in the 1930s the land was subdivided and added to the city and Patrick retained the property where their home was located.

== Marriage ==
Fannie Washington Brown married Frank Goodwill Patrick April 4, 1888, in Jalapa, Nebraska. Dodge County Judge Joachim John Barge (1843–1919), of Scribner, officiated. They had two children: Octa Maude Patrick (1889–1889) and Lloyd Brown Patrick (1892–1967).

== Death ==
She died on October 8, 1939.

== Bibliography ==
=== References ===
Books, journals, magazines, websites, papers
- Binheim, Max (1883–1942); Elvin, Charles Arthur (1883–1973) (eds.). Women of the West – A Series of Biographical Sketches of Living Eminent Women in the Eleven Western States of the United States of America. "Patrick, Fannie Brown" (1928 ed.). Los Angeles: Publishers Press. pp. 134 (photo on next unnumbered page) & 141. Retrieved August 8, 2017. OCLC 988617557 (all editions).
1. Via Internet Archive (UConn). Los Angeles, Calif., Publishers Press. 1928.
2. Via Google Books (Stanford University).
- Brown–Patrick Marriage, Jalapa, Nebraska, April 4, 1888 → Nebraska, U.S., Select County Marriage Records, 1855–1908 for Fannie W Brown; Dodge 1880–1889 (microfilmed by the Genealogical Society of Utah at the Nebraska State Historical Society by LDS Genealogical Missionaries Richard Owen Thornton (1933–2008) and wife, Agnes Marie Thornton (née Agnes Marie Johnson; 1931–2020); September 18, 1997. Film Emulsion No. 24339201. Film Unit Serial No. 2488. Project No. NEBR 02700. Roll No. 2). April 4, 1888. p. 391 of 574 (digital page 747 of 845) – via Ancestry.com and FamilySearch.
1. Via Ancestry.com → "Fannie W. Brown".
2. Via Ancestry.com → "Frank G. Patrick".
3. Via FamilySearch → "Fannie W. Brown".
4. Via FamilySearch → "Frank G. Patrick".
Original record: Marriage Record – Dodge County. Vol. 5 (February 5, 1886 – February 20, 1889). Book printed by Herald Printing, Nebraska. p. 391 of 574.
- Fannie Brown Patrick. Nevada Suffrage Centennial. Re: Fannie Brown Patrick (1864–1939) married Frank Goodwill Patrick (1854–1922) in 1888 in Jalapa, Nebraska.
- Southerland, Cindy E. (née Cynthia Elaine Peel; born 1952) (November 25, 2002). "The Patrick Ranch House (Arlinqton Place, Arlington Ranch)". "National Register Information System – Patrick Ranch (#03000417)". National Register of Historic Places. National Park Service. November 2, 2013.
News media
- Nevada State Journal → "Civic Leader Dies in Reno – Fannie Brown Patrick Taken by Death" (obituary). Vol. 8, no. 233. October 9, 1939. p. 1 (column 4) – via Newspapers.com. LCCN sn84-20370; OCLC 10686613 (all editions).
- Reno Evening Gazette → "Mrs. F.B. Patrick Taken by Death" (obituary). Vol. 63, no. 241. October 9, 1939. p. 2 (column 1) – via Newspapers.com. LCCN sn82-7252; ISSN 0745-1431; OCLC 8862511 (all editions).
