= C. C. Crowell House =

Historic house in Massachusetts, United States

- U.S. National Register of Historic Places
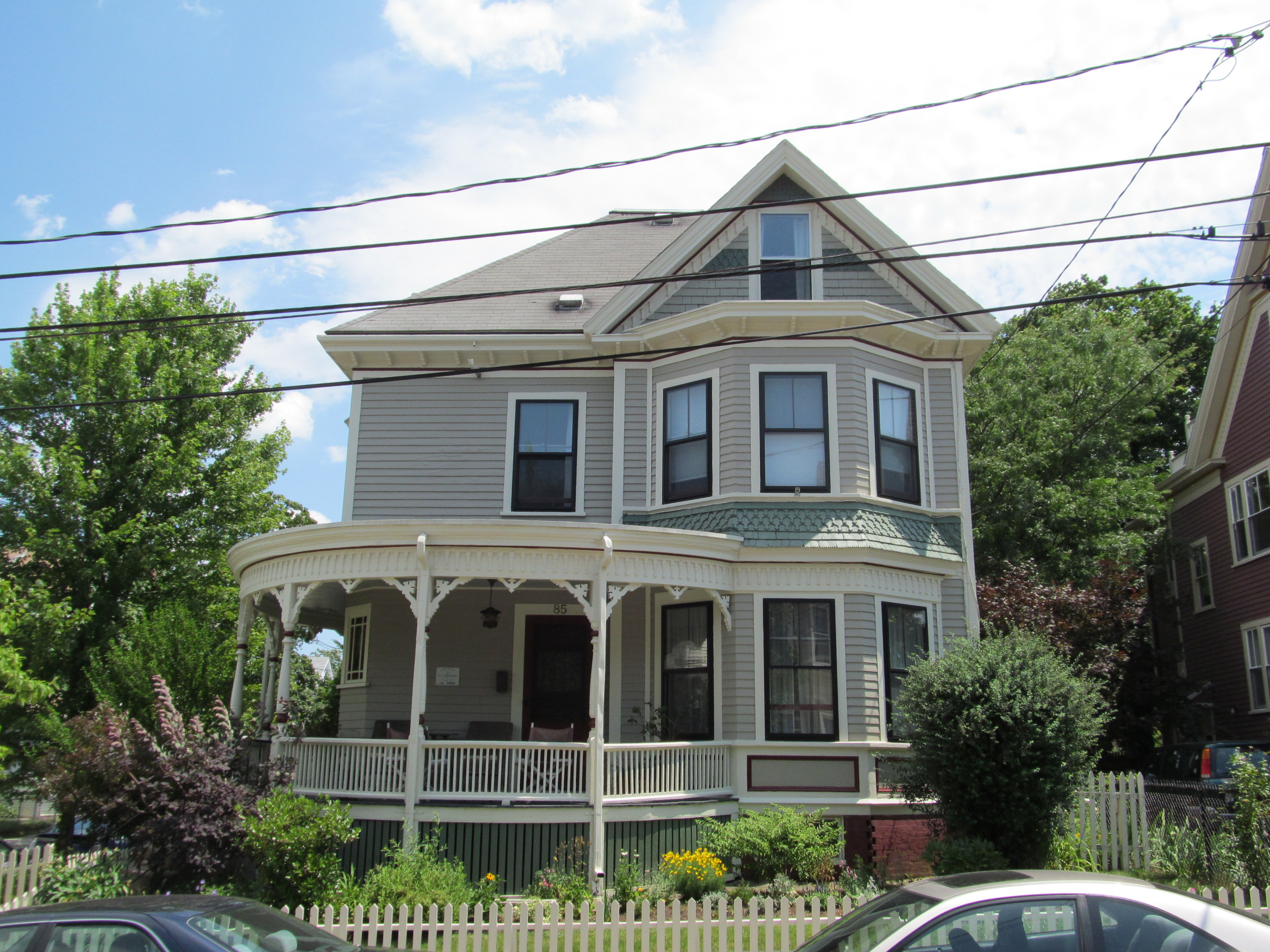
- C. C. Crowell House

- Location within Massachusetts Location within the United States
- Location: 85 Benton Rd., Somerville, Massachusetts
- Coordinates: 42°23′22.96″N 71°6′16.67″W
- Area: less than one acre
- Built: c. 1890
- Architectural style: Queen Anne
- MPS: Somerville MPS
- NRHP reference No.: 89001236
- Added to NRHP: September 18, 1989

The C. C. Crowell House is a historic house in Somerville, Massachusetts. Built about 1890, it is a good example of Queen Anne Victorian architecture built from a pattern book design. The house was listed on the National Register of Historic Places in 1989.

== Description and history ==
The C. C. Crowell House is located in Somerville's central Spring Hill neighborhood, at the southeast corner of Benton Road and Hudson Street. It is a 2 1/2-story wood-frame structure, with a gabled roof and mostly clapboarded exterior. The house is laid out in cross gable style, with a semicircular porch facing the street corner. The porch is decorated with turned posts, jigsaw struts, and a carved frieze. The upper levels are decorated with bands of cut shingles, and the extended eaves are decorated with modillions. There are two-story polygonal window bays projecting on both street-facing facades, with wood panels below the first floor windows, and decorative shingling between the floors.

The house was built about 1890; its first documented occupant was C. C. Crowell, a printer. The house bears some resemblance to the Lemuel Snow, Jr., House next door, whose massing and scale are similar. Both appear to have elements taken from pattern books, although those of this house are of a lighter character than those of its neighbor.

== See also ==
- National Register of Historic Places listings in Somerville, Massachusetts
