= De Soto, Nebraska =

Unincorporated community in Nebraska, United States

- Interactive map of De Soto, Nebraska
- Coordinates: 41°30′4.15″N 96°3′24.15″W
- Country: United States
- State: Nebraska
- County: Washington
- Elevation: 1,007 ft (307 m)
- Time zone: UTC-6 (Central (CST))
  - Summer (DST): UTC-5 (CDT)
- Area code: 402

De Soto is an unincorporated community in Washington County, Nebraska, United States. As of today, De Soto contains farmland with about three families residing there.

== History ==
Named in honor of the sixteenth-century Spanish explorer, Hernando De Soto, the community was founded in 1855 and served as the county seat from 1858-1866. During its heyday, the town hosted many flourishing new businesses: hotels, saloons, stores, newspapers and banks.
