= Patrick Ranch House (Reno, Nevada) =

Historic house in Nevada, United States

- U.S. National Register of Historic Places
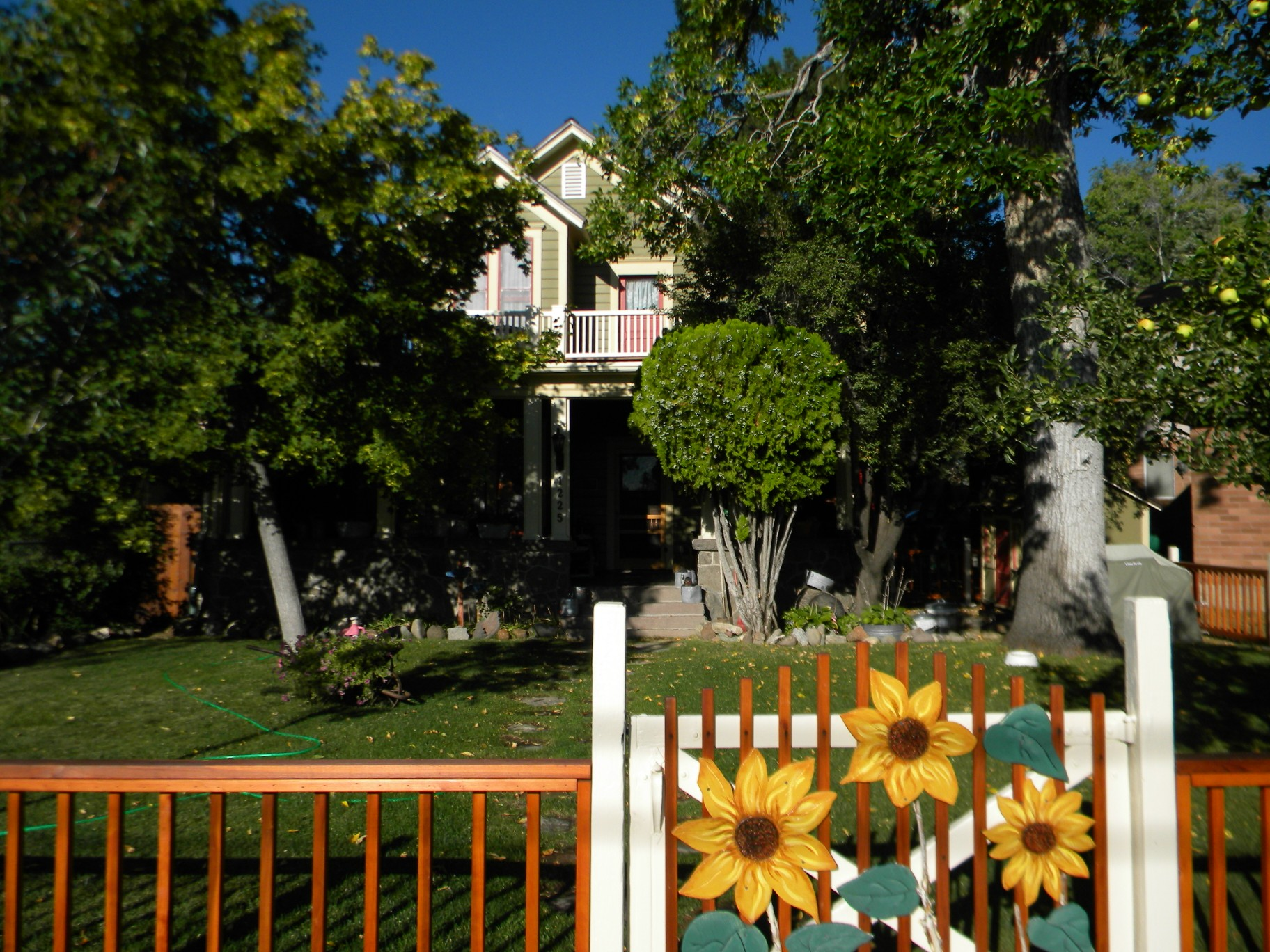

- Location within Nevada Location within the United States
- Location: 1225 Gordon Ave., Reno, Nevada
- Coordinates: 39°30′44″N 119°49′7″W
- Area: 0.1 acres (0.040 ha)
- Built: c.1901
- Architectural style: Queen Anne
- NRHP reference No.: 03000417
- Added to NRHP: May 16, 2003

The Patrick Ranch House, at 1225 Gordon Ave. in Reno, Nevada, was built c.1901 and has been described as "a charming, turn-of-the-century, Folk Victorian home with Queen Anne attributes." It was listed on the National Register of Historic Places in 2003. It was deemed significant "for its role in Reno's community planning and development history" and "as an excellent example of Folk Victorian/Queen Anne style of architecture, which is becoming increasingly rare."

Fannie Brown Patrick (1864–1939), with her husband, Frank Goodwill Patrick (1854–1922), operated the Patrick Ranch.
