= Nickerson Township, Dodge County, Nebraska =

Nickerson Township
- Township
- Location in Dodge County
- Coordinates: 41°31′29″N 096°29′54″W
- Country: United States
- State: Nebraska
- County: Dodge

Area
  - Total: 37.63 sq mi (97.47 km^{2})
  - Land: 37.20 sq mi (96.34 km^{2})
  - Water: 0.44 sq mi (1.13 km^{2}) 1.16%
- Elevation: 1,270 ft (387 m)

Population (2020)
  - Total: 700
  - Density: 19/sq mi (7.3/km^{2})
- GNIS feature ID: 0838158

Nickerson Township is one of fourteen townships in Dodge County, Nebraska, United States. The population was 700 at the 2020 census. A 2021 estimate placed the township's population at 680.

The Village of Nickerson lies within the Township.

== See also ==
- County government in Nebraska
- Jalapa, Nebraska
