= Township 5, Washington County, Nebraska =

Township in Nebraska, US

Coordinates: 41°38′05″N 96°14′55″W

Township 5 is one of five townships in Washington County, Nebraska, United States. The population was 1,388 at the 2000 census. A 2006 estimate placed the township's population at 1,545.

The Village of Herman lies within the Township.

== See also ==
- County government in Nebraska
