= Washington, Nebraska =

Village in Washington County, Nebraska, United States

- Village
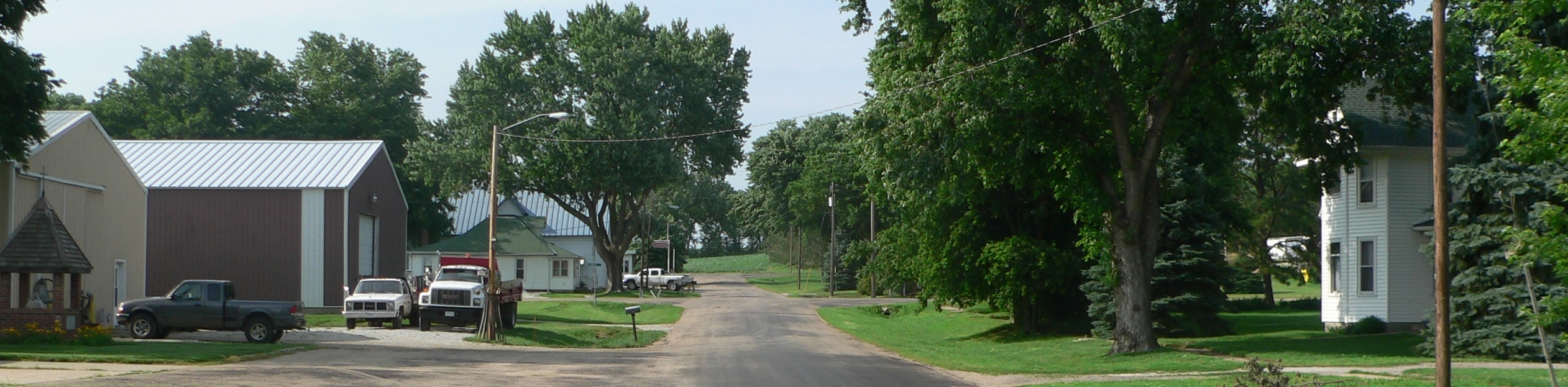
- Downtown Washington: Dorchester Street, June 2013

- Location of Washington, Nebraska
- Coordinates: 41°23′51″N 96°12′27″W
- Country: United States
- State: Nebraska
- County: Washington

Area
  - Total: 0.20 sq mi (0.53 km^{2})
  - Land: 0.20 sq mi (0.53 km^{2})
  - Water: 0 sq mi (0.00 km^{2})
- Elevation: 1,168 ft (356 m)

Population (2020)
  - Total: 129
  - Density: 630.0/sq mi (243.25/km^{2})
- Time zone: UTC-6 (Central (CST))
  - Summer (DST): UTC-5 (CDT)
- ZIP code: 68068
- Area code: 402
- FIPS code: 31-51595
- GNIS feature ID: 2400098

Washington is a village in Washington County, Nebraska, United States. The population was 129 at the 2020 census.

== History ==
Washington was platted in 1887 when the Fremont, Elkhorn and Missouri Valley Railroad was extended to that point. It was named from Washington County. Washington was incorporated as a village in 1915.

== Geography ==
According to the United States Census Bureau, the village has a total area of 0.21 square miles (0.54 km^{2}), all land.

== Demographics ==
Historical population
Census	Pop.	Note	%±
1920	117		—
1930	76		−35.0%
1940	84		10.5%
1950	55		−34.5%
1960	44		−20.0%
1970	76		72.7%
1980	113		48.7%
1990	125		10.6%
2000	126		0.8%
2010	150		19.0%
2020	129		−14.0%
U.S. Decennial Census

=== 2010 census ===
As of the census of 2010, there were 150 people, 55 households, and 42 families living in the village. The population density was 714.3 inhabitants per square mile (275.8/km^{2}). There were 55 housing units at an average density of 261.9 per square mile (101.1/km^{2}). The racial makeup of the village was 98.0% White, 1.3% African American, and 0.7% Native American.

There were 55 households, of which 32.7% had children under the age of 18 living with them, 65.5% were married couples living together, 9.1% had a female householder with no husband present, 1.8% had a male householder with no wife present, and 23.6% were non-families. 20.0% of all households were made up of individuals, and 5.5% had someone living alone who was 65 years of age or older. The average household size was 2.73 and the average family size was 3.14.

The median age in the village was 43 years. 24% of residents were under the age of 18; 6.7% were between the ages of 18 and 24; 22% were from 25 to 44; 33.4% were from 45 to 64; and 14% were 65 years of age or older. The gender makeup of the village was 50.0% male and 50.0% female.

=== 2000 census ===
As of the census of 2000, there were 126 people, 49 households, and 39 families living in the village. The population density was 749.8 inhabitants per square mile (289.5/km^{2}). There were 51 housing units at an average density of 303.5 per square mile (117.2/km^{2}). The racial makeup of the village was 99.21% White, and 0.79% from two or more races.

There were 49 households, out of which 30.6% had children under the age of 18 living with them, 71.4% were married couples living together, 8.2% had a female householder with no husband present, and 18.4% were non-families. 16.3% of all households were made up of individuals, and 6.1% had someone living alone who was 65 years of age or older. The average household size was 2.57 and the average family size was 2.90.

In the village, the population was spread out, with 23.8% under the age of 18, 5.6% from 18 to 24, 27.0% from 25 to 44, 23.8% from 45 to 64, and 19.8% who were 65 years of age or older. The median age was 40 years. For every 100 females, there were 110.0 males. For every 100 females age 18 and over, there were 95.9 males.

As of 2000 the median income for a household in the village was $50,000, and the median income for a family was $55,000. Males had a median income of $38,125 versus $28,125 for females. The per capita income for the village was $19,784. None of the population and none of the families were below the poverty line.

== See also ==
- List of municipalities in Nebraska
