= Lemuel Snow Jr. House =

Historic house in Massachusetts, United States

- U.S. National Register of Historic Places
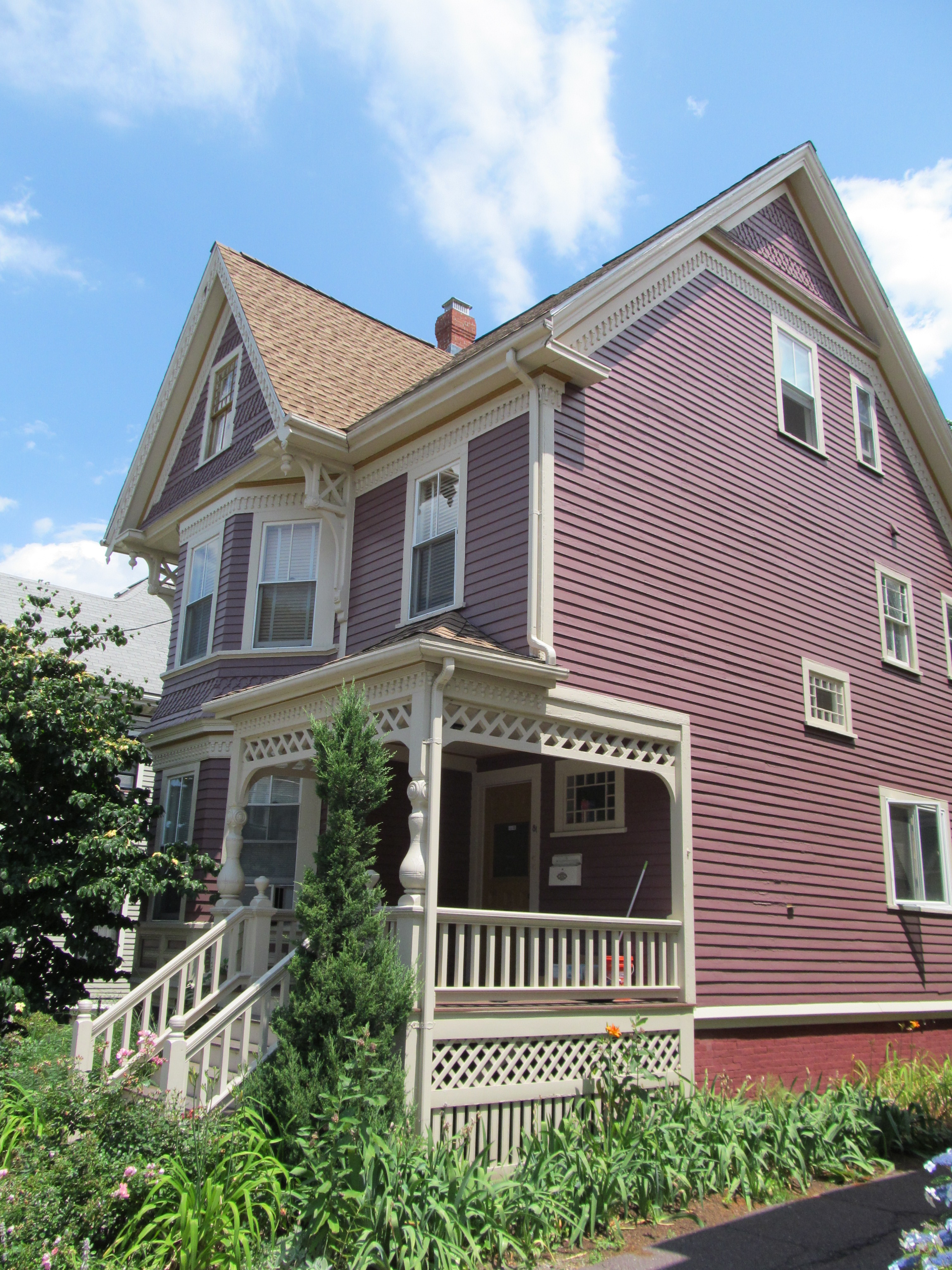
- Lemuel Snow Jr. House

- Location within Massachusetts Location within the United States
- Location: Somerville, Massachusetts
- Coordinates: 42°23′22.45″N 71°6′16.88″W
- Built: 1890
- Architect: Snow, Lemuel Jr.
- Architectural style: Queen Anne
- MPS: Somerville MPS
- NRHP reference No.: 89001234
- Added to NRHP: September 18, 1989

The Lemuel Snow Jr. House is a historic house at 81 Benton Road in Somerville, Massachusetts. The 2 1/2-story wood-frame Queen Anne style house was built c. 1890. Although its main roof line is side-gable, there is a front cross gable projecting over the front facade which is supported by decoratively cut knee brackets. The front entry porch is supported by heavy turned pillars, and has an openwork frieze. The house was built by Lemuel Snow, a local carpenter, for his son.

The house was listed on the National Register of Historic Places in 1989.

== See also ==
- National Register of Historic Places listings in Somerville, Massachusetts
