= Township 6, Washington County, Nebraska =

Township in Nebraska, US

Coordinates: 41°32′33″N 96°17′58″W

Township 6 is one of five townships in Washington County, Nebraska, United States. The population was 1,516 at the 2000 census. A 2006 estimate placed the township's population at 1,713.

== See also ==
- County government in Nebraska
