= Fontanelle Township Hall =

- U.S. National Register of Historic Places
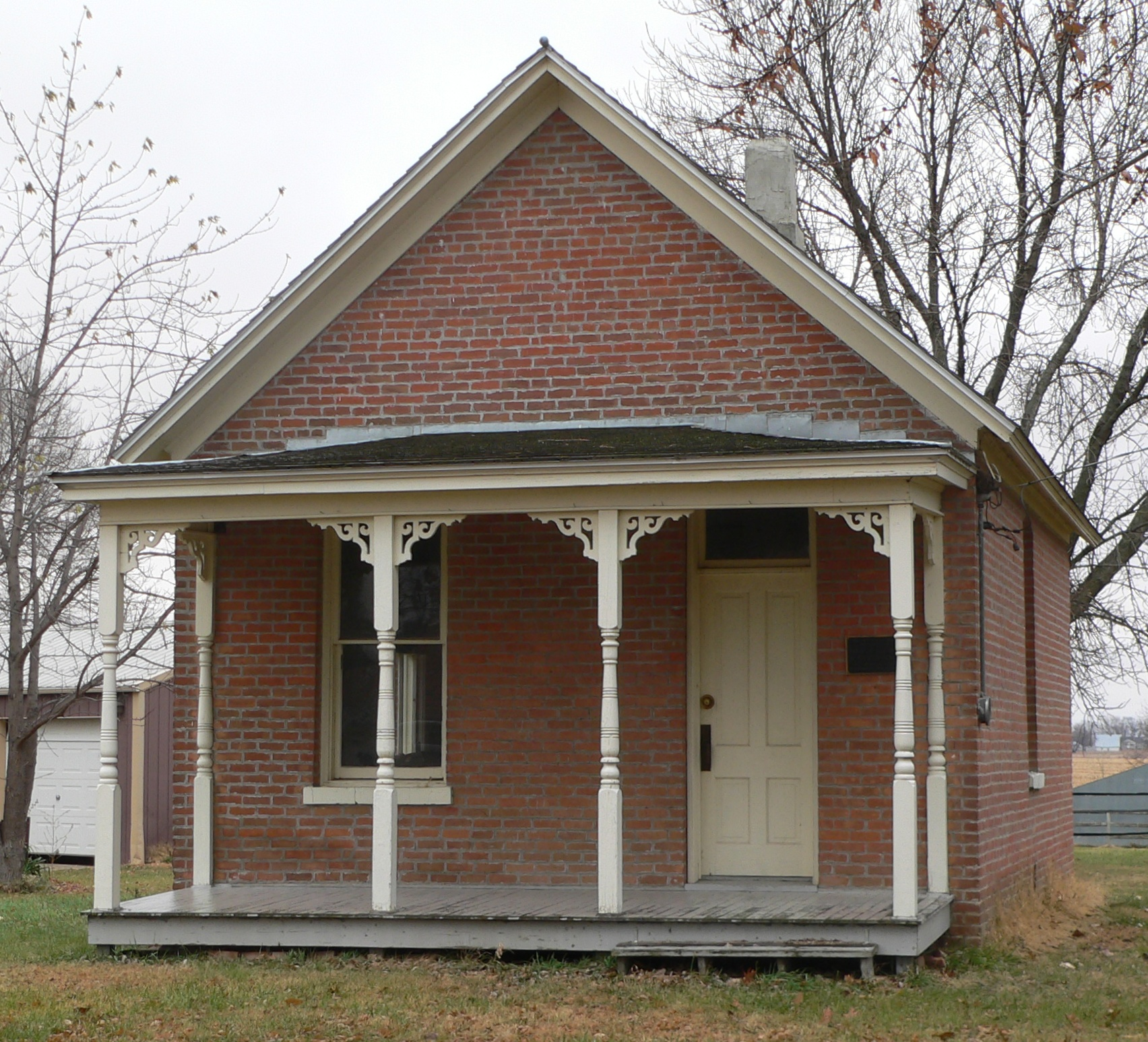
- The building in 2010

- Location within Nebraska Location within the United States
- Location: Off NE 91, Fontanelle, Nebraska
- Coordinates: 41°32′15″N 96°25′38″W
- Area: less than one acre
- Built: 1896
- Built by: H.J. Carpenter
- NRHP reference No.: 82003205
- Added to NRHP: September 9, 1982

The Fontanelle Township Hall is a historic one-story building in Fontanelle, Nebraska. It was built with bricks under the supervision of H.J. Carpenter in 1896. Inside, there are polling booths, and "wooden tongue-in-groove wainscotting [...] on all four walls." It has been listed on the National Register of Historic Places since September 9, 1982.
