= Washington County, Nebraska =

County in Nebraska, United States

- County
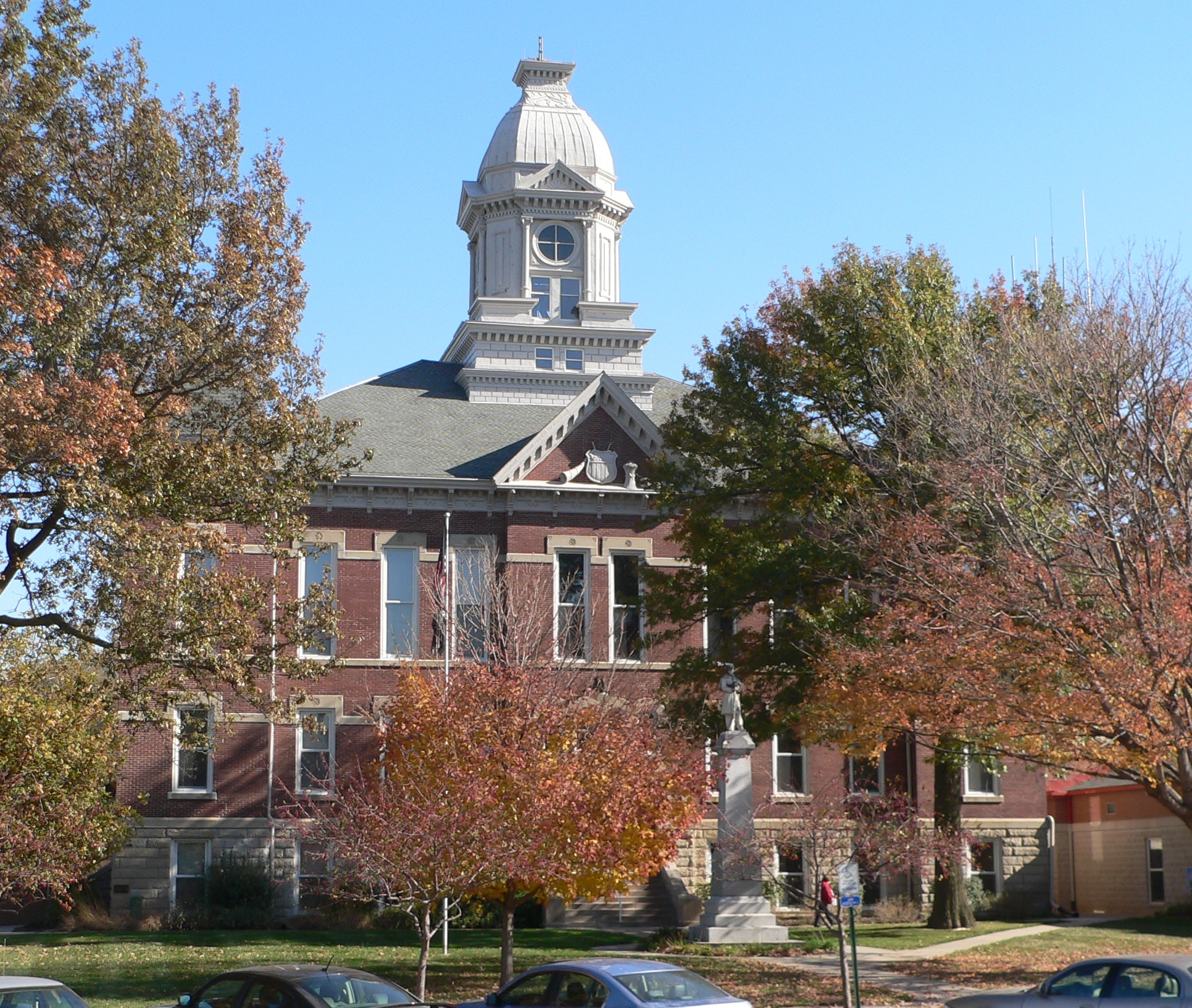
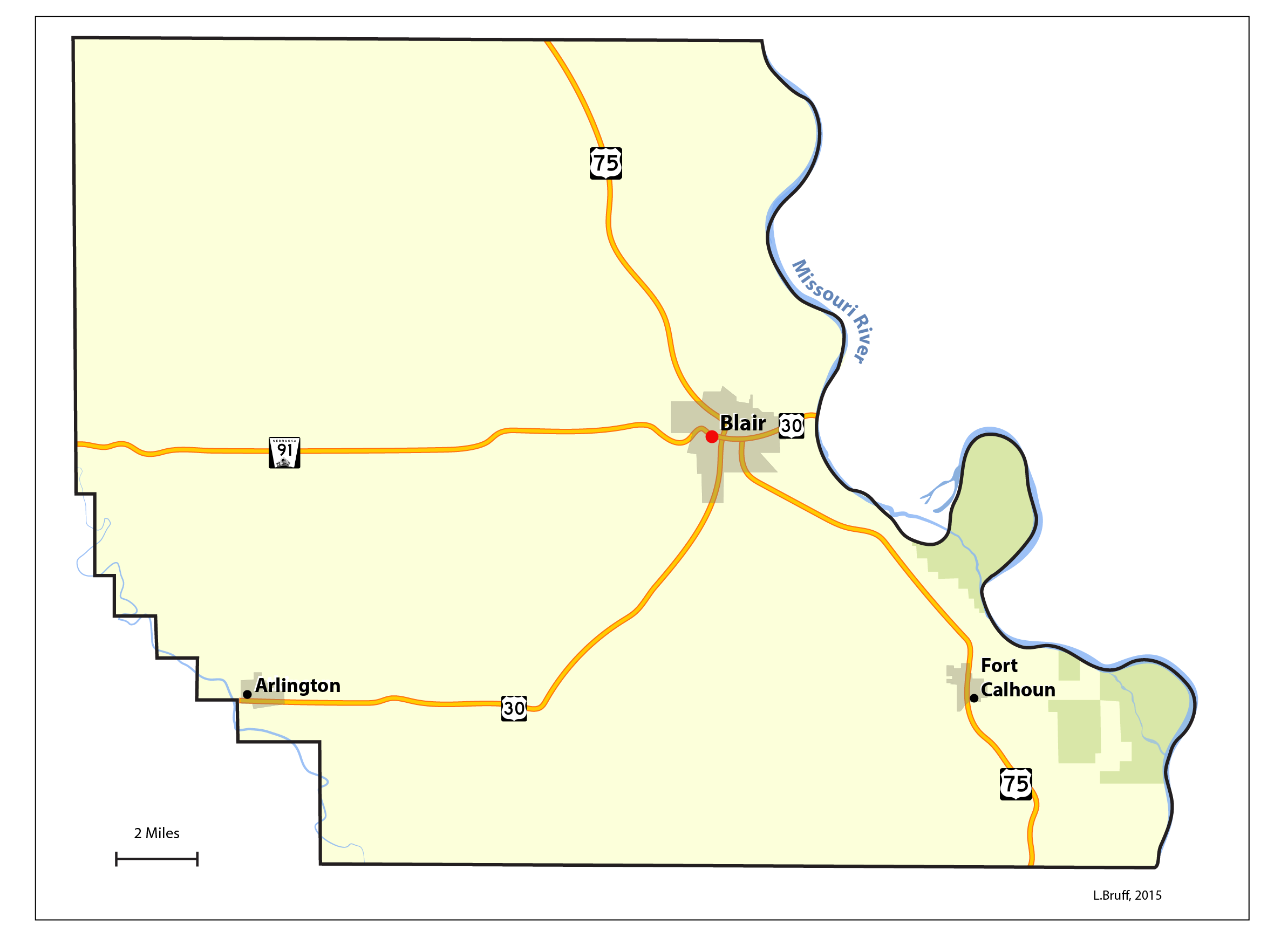
- The Washington County Courthouse in Blair Washington County, Nebraska

- Location within the U.S. state of Nebraska
- Coordinates: 41.533973°N 96.224577°W
- Country: United States
- State: Nebraska
- Founded: November 23, 1854
- Named for: George Washington
- Seat: Blair
- Largest city: Blair

Area
  - Total: 393.197 sq mi (1,018.38 km^{2})
  - Land: 389.930 sq mi (1,009.91 km^{2})
  - Water: 3.267 sq mi (8.46 km^{2}) 0.83%

Population (2020)
  - Total: 20,865
  - Estimate (2025): 21,302 ▲
  - Density: 53.510/sq mi (20.660/km^{2})
- Time zone: UTC−6 (Central)
  - Summer (DST): UTC−5 (CDT)
- Area code: 402 and 531
- Congressional district: 3rd
- Website: washingtoncountyne.gov
- • Nebraska county number 89 • Nebraska license plate prefix 29

Washington County is a county in the U.S. state of Nebraska. As of the 2020 census, the population was 20,865, and was estimated to be 21,302 in 2025. The county seat and the largest city is Blair.

Washington County is part of the Omaha–Council Bluffs metropolitan area.

In the Nebraska license plate system, Washington County was represented by the prefix "29" (as it had the 29th-largest number of vehicles registered in the state when the license plate system was established in 1922).

== History ==
Washington County was created on November 23, 1854 and named for George Washington.

Washington County is in eastern Nebraska on the Missouri River. It was explored by Europeans as early as 1739 by Pierre Antoine and Paul Mallet, who were on a trapping expedition to Canada. In 1804, Lewis and Clark reported the establishment of the new United States government to a council of Indian chiefs near the present site of Fort Calhoun. As a result of this council, Fort Atkinson was established in 1819 and served as a key midwestern outpost until 1827.

The first permanent settlement in Washington County was in 1854. In that same year, the county was organized as one of the eight original counties proclaimed by acting Governor Thomas B. Cuming; it was reorganized in 1855. The county seat has been in three different towns: Fort Calhoun, DeSoto, and Blair, its present site since 1869.

The Fort Calhoun Nuclear Generating Station south of Blair, which was North America's smallest commercial nuclear reactor by rated capacity, was closed in October 2016 to begin decommissioning. An associated system of warning sirens was located in the southeastern part of the county for emergency notification in the event of a problem at the station.

An Atlas missile launch site (Site B), formerly associated with Offutt Air Force Base and deactivated in the 1960s, lies east of Arlington.

== Geography ==
According to the United States Census Bureau, the county has a total area of 393.197 square miles (1,018.38 km^{2}), of which 389.930 square miles (1,009.91 km^{2}) is land and 3.267 square miles (8.46 km^{2}) (0.83%) is water. It is the 5th-smallest county in Nebraska by total area.

Washington County lies on the east side of Nebraska. Its east boundary line abuts the west boundary line of the state of Iowa, across the Missouri River. The Elkhorn River flows southeastward along the county's southwest border, and a smaller drainage, the Little Papillon River, flows southward through the center part of the county, discharging into Glenn Cunningham Reservoir south of the county. The county's terrain consists of low rolling hills sloping to the east, with several drainage channels eroded into its eastern portion sloping down to the river. The county's planar areas are largely devoted to agriculture.

== Transportation ==
=== Major highways ===
- U.S. Highway 30
- U.S. Highway 75
- Nebraska Highway 31
- Nebraska Highway 91
- Nebraska Highway 133

=== Airports ===
Washington County contains Blair Municipal Airport, and several small privately owned grass airstrips, such as the Orum Aerodrome. There is also a helipad at the Memorial Community Hospital in Blair.

=== Adjacent counties ===
- Burt County – north
- Harrison County, Iowa – northeast
- Pottawattamie County, Iowa – southeast
- Douglas County – south
- Dodge County – west

=== Protected areas ===
- Boyer Chute National Wildlife Refuge
- DeSoto National Wildlife Refuge (part)
- Fort Atkinson State Historical Park
- Neale Woods Nature Center (partial)

== Demographics ==
Historical population
Census	Pop.	Note	%±
1860	1,249		—
1870	4,452		256.4%
1880	8,631		93.9%
1890	11,869		37.5%
1900	13,086		10.3%
1910	12,738		−2.7%
1920	12,180		−4.4%
1930	12,095		−0.7%
1940	11,578		−4.3%
1950	11,511		−0.6%
1960	12,103		5.1%
1970	13,310		10.0%
1980	15,508		16.5%
1990	16,607		7.1%
2000	18,780		13.1%
2010	20,234		7.7%
2020	20,865		3.1%
2025 (est.)	21,302	▲	2.1%
U.S. Decennial Census; 1790–1960 1900–1990; 1990–2000 2010–2020

=== 2020 census ===
As of the 2020 census, the county had a population of 20,865. The median age was 42.5 years. 24.2% of residents were under the age of 18 and 19.1% of residents were 65 years of age or older. For every 100 females there were 99.5 males, and for every 100 females age 18 and over there were 97.2 males age 18 and over.

The racial makeup of the county was 93.5% White, 0.3% Black or African American, 0.2% American Indian and Alaska Native, 0.5% Asian, 0.0% Native Hawaiian and Pacific Islander, 1.2% from some other race, and 4.3% from two or more races. Hispanic or Latino residents of any race comprised 3.0% of the population.

38.3% of residents lived in urban areas, while 61.7% lived in rural areas.

There were 8,115 households in the county, of which 31.7% had children under the age of 18 living with them and 19.0% had a female householder with no spouse or partner present. About 23.7% of all households were made up of individuals and 11.9% had someone living alone who was 65 years of age or older.

There were 8,577 housing units, of which 5.4% were vacant. Among occupied housing units, 80.2% were owner-occupied and 19.8% were renter-occupied. The homeowner vacancy rate was 1.3% and the rental vacancy rate was 7.2%.

=== 2010 census ===
As of the 2010 census, there were 20,234 people and 8,022 households in the county. The racial makeup of the county was 97.1% White, 0.8% Black or African American, 0.4% Native American, 0.4% Asian, 0.1% Pacific Islander, 1.2% from two or more races. 3.1% of the population were Hispanic or Latino of any race. 94.4% of the county was Non-Hispanic White.

=== 2000 census ===
As of the 2000 census, there were 18,780 people, 6,940 households, and 5,149 families in the county. The population density was 48 people per square mile (19 people/km^{2}). There were 7,408 housing units at an average density of 19 units per square mile (7.3/km^{2}). The racial makeup of the county was 98.12% White, 0.34% Black or African American, 0.20% Native American, 0.29% Asian, 0.11% Pacific Islander, 0.30% from other races, and 0.63% from two or more races. 1.08% of the population were Hispanic or Latino of any race. 37.1% were of German, 11.9% Danish, 9.0% Irish, 7.8% American and 7.0% English ancestry.

There were 6,940 households, out of which 36.40% had children under the age of 18 living with them, 64.00% were married couples living together, 7.00% had a female householder with no husband present, and 25.80% were non-families. 21.80% of all households were made up of individuals, and 10.10% had someone living alone who was 65 years of age or older. The average household size was 2.63 and the average family size was 3.09.

The county population contained 27.10% under the age of 18, 9.30% from 18 to 24, 26.70% from 25 to 44, 24.10% from 45 to 64, and 12.90% who were 65 years of age or older. The median age was 37 years. For every 100 females there were 98.70 males. For every 100 females age 18 and over, there were 96.20 males.

The median income for a household in the county was $48,500, and the median income for a family was $56,429. Males had a median income of $36,901 versus $25,893 for females. The per capita income for the county was $21,055. About 4.10% of families and 6.00% of the population were below the poverty line, including 8.00% of those under age 18 and 7.50% of those age 65 or over.

== Communities ==
=== Cities ===
- Blair (county seat)
- Fort Calhoun

=== Villages ===
- Arlington
- Herman
- Kennard
- Washington

=== Census-designated place ===
- Fontanelle

=== Unincorporated communities ===
- De Soto
- Nashville
- Orum
- Spiker
- Telbasta

=== Precincts ===
- Fort Calhoun
- Richland
- Herman
- Township 6
- Arlington

== Politics ==
Between 1900 and 1936, Washington County was a bellwether county, voting for the winner of the nationwide presidential election until Wendell Willkie won it despite losing nationwide. However, as is the case in most rural counties throughout Nebraska and the rest of America, the county's voters have since become reliably Republican from 1940 onward. As of 2020, in only one presidential election since 1936, that being Lyndon Johnson's narrow victory in 1964, has the county selected the Democratic Party candidate, and even he was only able to win it by a single point.

United States presidential election results for Washington County, Nebraska
Year	Republican		Democratic		Third party(ies)	
Year	No.	%	No.	%	No.	%
1900	1,741	54.39%	1,412	44.11%	48	1.50%
1904	1,868	64.39%	795	27.40%	238	8.20%
1908	1,592	50.85%	1,460	46.63%	79	2.52%
1912	599	21.44%	1,180	42.23%	1,015	36.33%
1916	1,297	43.97%	1,555	52.71%	98	3.32%
1920	2,409	63.60%	1,295	34.19%	84	2.22%
1924	1,876	45.16%	1,231	29.63%	1,047	25.20%
1928	2,750	58.71%	1,912	40.82%	22	0.47%
1932	1,382	26.80%	3,709	71.92%	66	1.28%
1936	2,263	39.47%	3,426	59.75%	45	0.78%
1940	2,922	52.57%	2,636	47.43%	0	0.00%
1944	2,844	55.57%	2,274	44.43%	0	0.00%
1948	2,400	55.74%	1,906	44.26%	0	0.00%
1952	3,770	69.11%	1,685	30.89%	0	0.00%
1956	3,531	67.10%	1,731	32.90%	0	0.00%
1960	3,772	69.01%	1,694	30.99%	0	0.00%
1964	2,638	49.41%	2,701	50.59%	0	0.00%
1968	3,063	63.36%	1,279	26.46%	492	10.18%
1972	4,290	75.38%	1,401	24.62%	0	0.00%
1976	3,799	62.17%	2,233	36.54%	79	1.29%
1980	4,570	70.71%	1,454	22.50%	439	6.79%
1984	5,191	76.44%	1,565	23.05%	35	0.52%
1988	4,587	63.80%	2,567	35.70%	36	0.50%
1992	4,042	48.47%	2,116	25.37%	2,182	26.16%
1996	4,391	57.03%	2,248	29.19%	1,061	13.78%
2000	5,758	66.75%	2,550	29.56%	318	3.69%
2004	7,083	71.19%	2,754	27.68%	113	1.14%
2008	6,425	62.26%	3,711	35.96%	184	1.78%
2012	6,899	67.33%	3,132	30.57%	215	2.10%
2016	7,424	68.54%	2,623	24.22%	785	7.25%
2020	8,583	68.85%	3,554	28.51%	330	2.65%
2024	8,855	70.24%	3,538	28.06%	214	1.70%

== See also ==
- Washington County Historical Association
- National Register of Historic Places listings in Washington County, Nebraska
