= Fontanelle, Nebraska =

Census-designated place in Washington County, Nebraska, United States

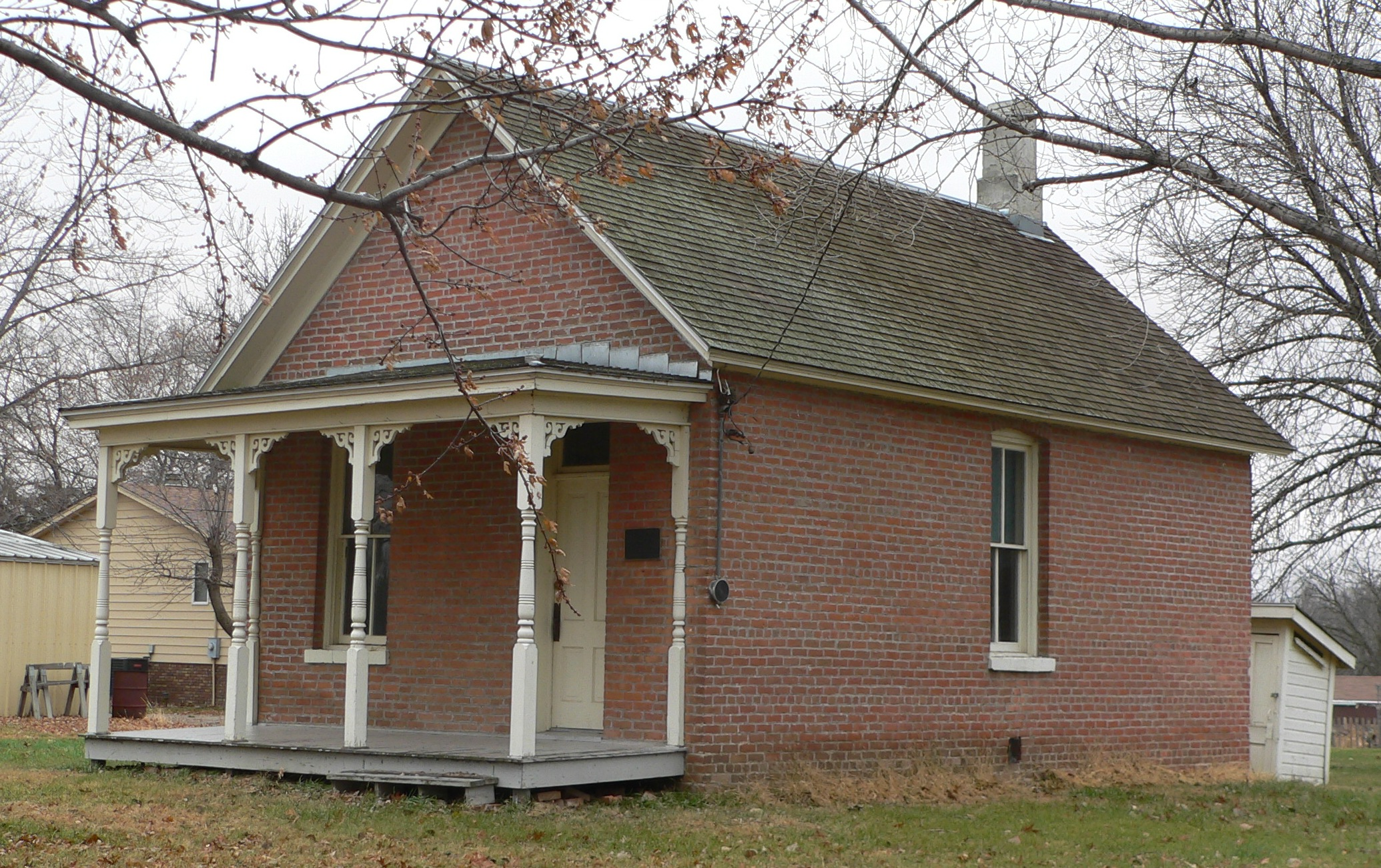
- Fontanelle Township Hall, November 2010

- Location in Nebraska Location in the United States
- Coordinates: 41°32′18″N 96°25′38″W
- Country: United States
- State: Nebraska
- County: Washington

Area
  - Total: 0.25 sq mi (0.65 km^{2})
  - Land: 0.25 sq mi (0.65 km^{2})
  - Water: 0 sq mi (0.00 km^{2})
- Elevation: 1,342 ft (409 m)

Population (2020)
  - Total: 67
  - Density: 265.4/sq mi (102.48/km^{2})
- ZIP code: 68044
- Area codes: 402 and 531
- FIPS code: 31-17040
- GNIS feature ID: 2583880

Fontanelle is a census-designated place (CDP) in Washington County, Nebraska, United States. As of the 2020 census, Fontanelle had a population of 67.

== History ==
The site of repeated incursions by the neighboring Pawnee tribe, Fontanelle was an early boom town in the Nebraska Territory, but waned in importance after failing to secure a railroad connection in the late 19th century. The 1860 Federal Census showed the town having dozens of residents, including farmers, carpenters, blacksmiths, clergymen, lawyers, and other professions. The town dwindled from a population of 500 to a few dozen after an early university left in the 1870s, it failed to get a railroad connection, and the nation suffered a financial depression.

A misspelling of the name of Logan Fontenelle, this town was named in honor of the Omaha Tribe leader, who was killed in 1855 by Sioux. He had served as interpreter to a delegation of Omaha chiefs in negotiation with the United States when they agreed to cede most of their land in Nebraska to the US. The town was originally organized by the Nebraska Colonization Company, founded in Quincy, Illinois, in 1854. The company's goal in founding the town was to develop "a literary institution which shall be known as the Nebraska University." In spring 1855 a prospecting party chose the site about twelve miles from the present city of Fremont.

Fontanelle was the original seat of Dodge County, but later became a part of Washington County. It was originally promoted for the territorial capital, but lost to Omaha City to the south. It had one of the first churches in the Nebraska Territory. The Nebraska Territory Legislature awarded a charter to the Nebraska University, also called Fontanelle University, in 1855, and the first building was erected in 1856. Operated by the Congregational Church the University flourished for several years. When Fontanelle lost the county seat, leaders decided to move the university, and Doane College was organized in Crete, Nebraska in 1872.

Located next to the Elkhorn River, the town was raided several times by the Pawnee in its early years. By August 1855 the United States Army established a post in the town to protect the area, with additional posts set up at Tekamah and Elkhorn City and a standing militia protected the region for several years after. The New York Times sent a correspondent late in that year to confirm the safety of settlers to the Nebraska Territory. In 1859 the Pawnee were encamped across the river during the Pawnee War.

Voters in the town held their first annual meeting in 1884, and in 1896 they approved the construction of a one-story brick hall called the Fontanelle Township Hall to serve as a meeting hall and polling place. It stands today and is listed on the National Register of Historic Places.

Failure to secure a railroad connection, financial depression, and other reverses led the town to fold in the 1890s. Today it is an unincorporated community.

== Geography ==
Fontanelle is in western Washington County, 10 miles (16 km) northeast of Fremont, along Nebraska Highway 91. It is 4 miles (6 km) east of U.S. Routes 77 and 275.

== Demographics ==
Historical population
Census	Pop.	Note	%±
2020	67		—
U.S. Decennial Census

== See also ==
- List of census-designated places in Nebraska
- Washington County Historical Association
