= C.C. Crowell Jr. House =

- C. C. Crowell, Jr., House
- U.S. National Register of Historic Places
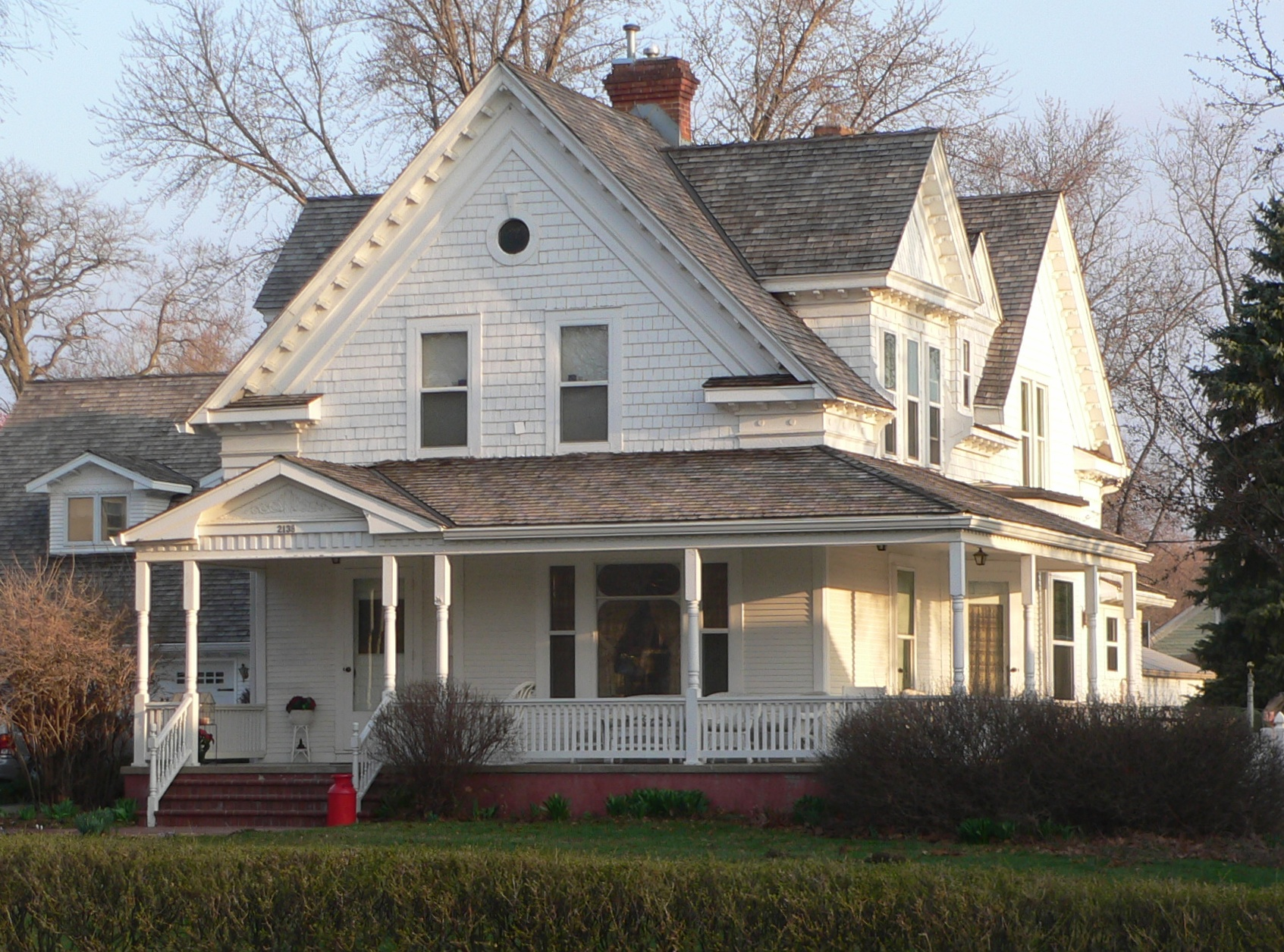
- The house in 2012

- Location within Nebraska Location within the United States
- Location: 2138 Washington Street, Blair, Nebraska
- Coordinates: 41°32′37″N 96°08′40″W
- Area: less than one acre
- Built: 1901
- Architectural style: Classical Revival, Queen Anne
- NRHP reference No.: 82003204
- Added to NRHP: July 19, 1982

The C.C. Crowell Jr. House is a historic house in Blair, Nebraska. It was built in 1901 for C.C. Crowell Jr. by Adolph and Johnny Aye who owned the Aye Brothers feed & seed in Blair and the Aye family lived in the house until 1926 when Mr. Aye died. The house was designed in the Classical Revival and Queen Anne architectural styles. It has been listed on the National Register of Historic Places since July 19, 1982.It is often confused with the Crowell mansion that was also owned by C.C. Crowell, Jr., a businessman who bequeathed it to the United Methodist Church upon his death. It was remodelled as a retirement facility for Methodists and renamed the Crowell Memorial Home. That mansion was demolished in 1971.
