= George L. Miller =

American politician

George Lorin Miller
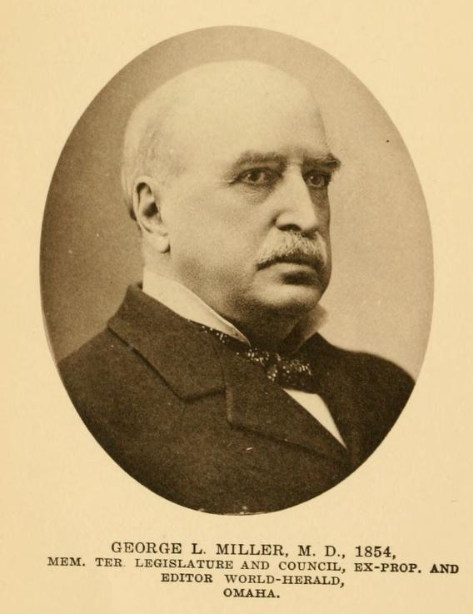

4th President of the Nebraska Territorial Council
- In office December 8, 1857 – January 16, 1858
- Preceded by: Leavitt L. Bowen
- Succeeded by: Leavitt L. Bowen

Personal details
- Born: c. 1830
- Died: 1920 Omaha, Nebraska
- Occupation: editor

George Lorin Miller (c. 1830 – 1920) was an American pioneer physician, editor, politician, and land owner in Omaha, Nebraska. The founder of the Omaha Herald, which later became part of the Omaha World-Herald, Miller arrived in Omaha in 1854, the year the city was founded. He also promoted Omaha as the route of the First transcontinental railroad and the Trans-Mississippi and International Exposition in Omaha in 1898.

== Biography ==
Born to Omaha pioneer politician Lorin Miller, George L. Miller was a graduate from medical school in New York City in 1852. He practiced in Syracuse, New York, for two years before coming to Omaha where his parents settled in 1854. He started the first medical practice in the city upon his arrival.

Miller was elected to the Nebraska Territorial Legislature in 1854. He served one year in the house and then was elected to three terms in the council, serving as president of the council in his second term. In 1855 Miller requested that the Congregationalist Church send a minister to Omaha, leading to the assignment of Reuben Gaylord, the city's foremost Christian missionary in its early years. In 1860 Miller moved to St. Joseph, Missouri, where he submitted articles to local newspapers. During that period Miller decided to leave medicine to pursue other ventures. Miller helped recruit the First Nebraska Regiment prior to the Civil War and served as sutler at Fort Kearny until 1864. That year he returned to Omaha and ran for territorial delegate to Congress and was defeated. The following year he started the Democratic Omaha Daily Herald. Miller was attacked by Republican Edward Rosewater of the Omaha Bee on September 6, 1876, as a "jack-of-all trades and a master of none. . . . a medicine man, a hotel builder, an army sutler, a cotton speculator, a railroad jobber, an eating-house keeper, journalist, and a politician. . . [and] a dishonest, unscrupulous, and unprincipled money-grabber." He was the editor of the Omaha Daily Herald for almost twenty-three years before selling the paper in 1887.

In the 1870s he helped Omaha land placement along the First transcontinental railroad and the Union Pacific Missouri River Bridge. Miller was a Nebraska delegate to 1876 Democratic National Convention. The New York Times labeled Miller "the original Tilden man of the West" for his support of Samuel J. Tilden's presidential campaign that year. In 1879 he gave a tribute to Reverend Gaylord at his funeral. During this period Miller bought a large amount of land in North Omaha, eventually offering a large chunk of his own land for usage as the site of the Trans-Mississippi and International Exposition in Omaha in 1898. Miller served as president of the Expo after his site lost to Kountze Park.

In the late 1880s Dr. Miller built a mansion at what is now 75th and Oakwood Streets in Ralston, a West Omaha suburb. In 1898 the home was destroyed by a fire. Miller helped the new St. Martin of Tours Episcopal Church acquire the limestone used in the mansion, and that building still stands. On September 17, 1900, Miller was placed "under restraint" at the upscale Paxton Hotel in Downtown Omaha. Reports designated him a "raving maniac" and attributed his behavior to paresis.

Miller was president of the Nebraska State Historical Society from 1907 to 1909, and was also the first president of the Board of Park Commissioners in Omaha. In 1907 he did not support fellow Nebraskan Democrat William Jennings Bryan's politics during his candidacy for president, stating that Bryan "is not a Democrat" and challenging his politics as "radical."

J. Sterling Morton, the other prominent member of the Democratic Party in Nebraska, was a bitter enemy of Miller's during this period. Yet Morton recognized Miller's ability and said of him, "No other man, either by the power of money, or by the power of brawn, or by the strength of brain, did as much to make Omaha a city."

Miller died in Omaha in 1920.

== Nebraska Humane Society ==
Miller founded the Nebraska Humane Society, an animal welfare organization in 1875. He left his entire estate worth $100,000 to the Society.

== Legacy ==
Omaha has several tributes to Miller. Miller Park Elementary School, Miller Park, and the Miller Park neighborhood in North Omaha are all named in his honor, as well as the new George Miller Parkway in West Omaha.

== See also ==
- History of Omaha
