= Kennard, Nebraska =

Village in Washington County, Nebraska, United States

- Village
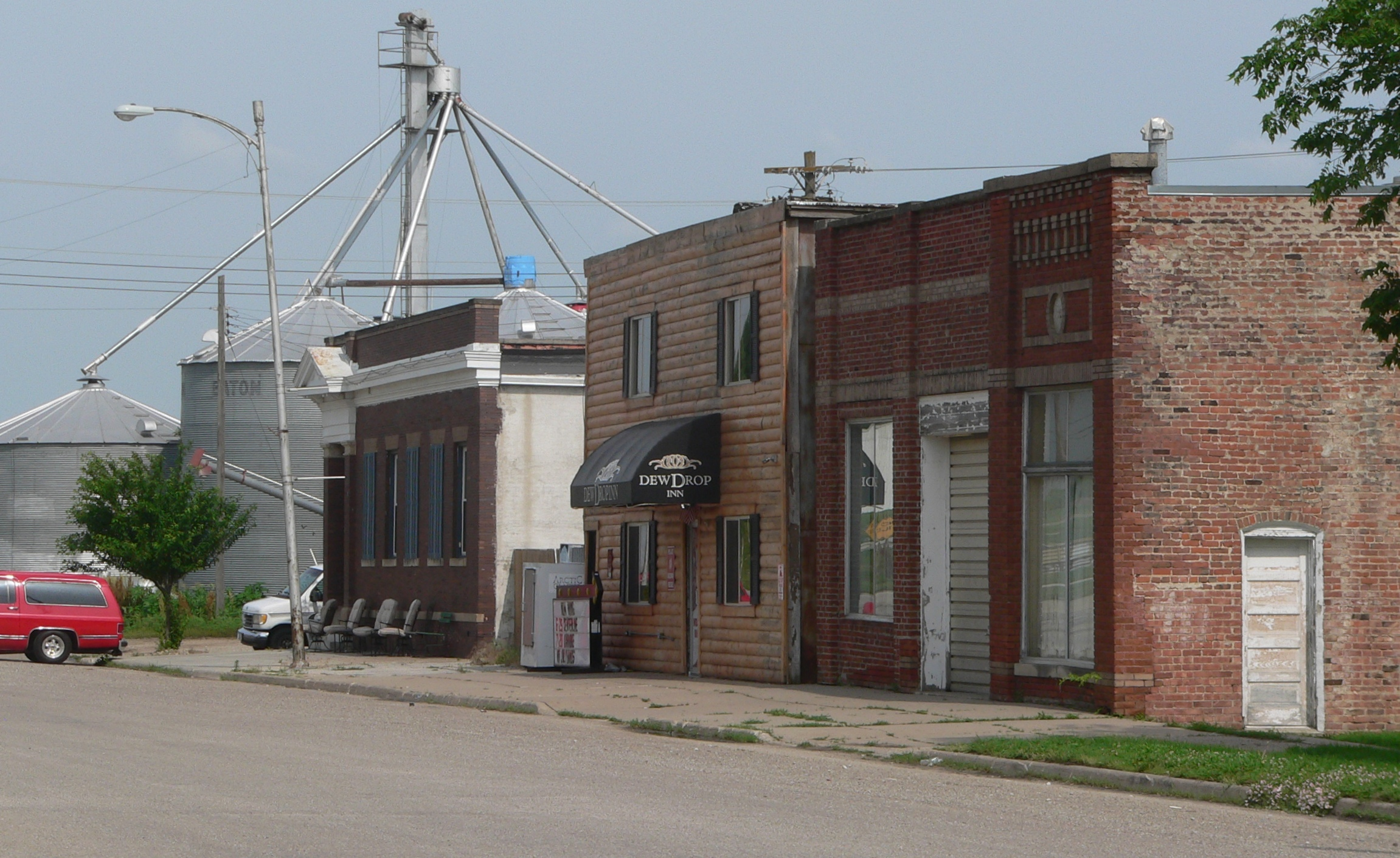
- Downtown Kennard: Maple Street, June 2013

- Location of Kennard, Nebraska
- Coordinates: 41°28′29″N 96°12′13″W
- Country: United States
- State: Nebraska
- County: Washington

Area
  - Total: 0.30 sq mi (0.77 km^{2})
  - Land: 0.30 sq mi (0.77 km^{2})
  - Water: 0 sq mi (0.00 km^{2})
- Elevation: 1,184 ft (361 m)

Population (2020)
  - Total: 381
  - Density: 1,281.6/sq mi (494.83/km^{2})
- Time zone: UTC-6 (Central (CST))
  - Summer (DST): UTC-5 (CDT)
- ZIP code: 68034
- Area code: 402
- FIPS code: 31-25230
- GNIS feature ID: 2398338
- Website: villageofkennard.com

Kennard is a village in Washington County, Nebraska, United States. As of the 2020 census, Kennard had a population of 381.

== History ==
Kennard was established in 1869 when the Sioux City & Pacific Railroad was extended to that point. It was named for Thomas P. Kennard, the first Secretary of State for Nebraska. The town was incorporated in 1895.

== Geography ==
According to the United States Census Bureau, the village has a total area of 0.30 square miles (0.78 km^{2}), all land.

== Demographics ==
Historical population
Census	Pop.	Note	%±
1900	275		—
1910	319		16.0%
1920	363		13.8%
1930	319		−12.1%
1940	315		−1.3%
1950	273		−13.3%
1960	331		21.2%
1970	336		1.5%
1980	372		10.7%
1990	371		−0.3%
2000	371		0.0%
2010	361		−2.7%
2020	381		5.5%
U.S. Decennial Census

=== 2010 census ===
As of the census of 2010, there were 361 people, 150 households, and 95 families living in the village. The population density was 1,203.3 inhabitants per square mile (464.6/km^{2}). There were 158 housing units at an average density of 526.7 per square mile (203.4/km^{2}). The racial makeup of the village was 97.8% White, 0.3% Native American, 0.3% Asian, 1.4% from other races, and 0.3% from two or more races. Hispanic or Latino of any race were 1.7% of the population.

There were 150 households, of which 31.3% had children under the age of 18 living with them, 53.3% were married couples living together, 6.0% had a female householder with no husband present, 4.0% had a male householder with no wife present, and 36.7% were non-families. 28.7% of all households were made up of individuals, and 11.4% had someone living alone who was 65 years of age or older. The average household size was 2.41 and the average family size was 3.02.

The median age in the village was 38.7 years. 25.2% of residents were under the age of 18; 3.9% were between the ages of 18 and 24; 29.9% were from 25 to 44; 26% were from 45 to 64; and 15% were 65 years of age or older. The gender makeup of the village was 51.8% male and 48.2% female.

=== 2000 census ===
As of the census of 2000, there were 371 people, 143 households, and 106 families living in the village. The population density was 1,242.0 inhabitants per square mile (479.5/km^{2}). There were 148 housing units at an average density of 495.5 per square mile (191.3/km^{2}). The racial makeup of the village was 96.77% White, 0.27% African American, 0.81% Native American, 0.81% Asian, 0.27% from other races, and 1.08% from two or more races. Hispanic or Latino of any race were 0.27% of the population.

There were 143 households, out of which 37.1% had children under the age of 18 living with them, 65.0% were married couples living together, 7.0% had a female householder with no husband present, and 25.2% were non-families. 21.0% of all households were made up of individuals, and 9.1% had someone living alone who was 65 years of age or older. The average household size was 2.59 and the average family size was 3.04.

In the village, the population was spread out, with 29.9% under the age of 18, 4.3% from 18 to 24, 27.8% from 25 to 44, 25.9% from 45 to 64, and 12.1% who were 65 years of age or older. The median age was 37 years. For every 100 females, there were 100.5 males. For every 100 females age 18 and over, there were 94.0 males.

As of 2000 the median income for a household in the village was $32,917, and the median income for a family was $50,625. Males had a median income of $35,500 versus $23,750 for females. The per capita income for the village was $17,499. About 2.0% of families and 5.2% of the population were below the poverty line, including 2.4% of those under age 18 and 14.6% of those age 65 or over.

== Notable Person ==
- Floyd Zaiger (1926–2020), a fruit breeder, was born in Kennard.

== See also ==
- List of municipalities in Nebraska
