= Alfred T. Andreas =

American book publisher and historian

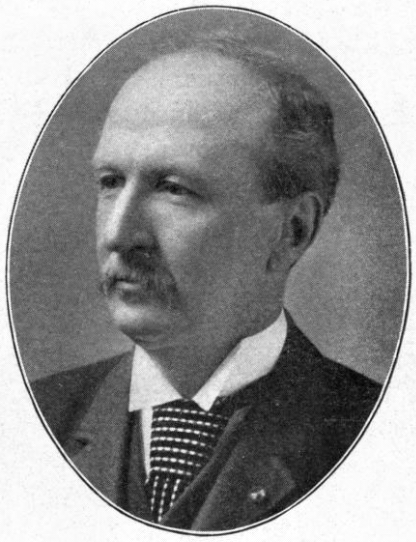
- Born: Alfred Theodore Andreas; May 29, 1839; Amity, Orange County, New York
- Died: February 10, 1900 (aged 60); New Rochelle, New York
- Burial place: Oakdale Memorial Gardens, Davenport, Iowa
- Spouse: Sophia Lyter (m. 1865; died 1900)
- Military career
- Allegiance: United States
- Branch: Union
- Service years: 1861–1865
- Rank: Captain
- Units: 12th Illinois Infantry, Company G
- Conflicts: American Civil War: Battle of Shiloh; Siege of Corinth; Second Battle of Corinth; Battle of Resaca; Battle of Atlanta; Battle of Jonesborough; March to the Sea; Battle of Bentonville
- Other work: Book publisher

Alfred Theodore Andreas (May 29, 1839 – February 10, 1900) was an American book publisher and historian.

== Life ==
He was born in Amity, Orange County, New York, on May 29, 1839.

After acquiring an education, he moved to Dubuque, Iowa, where he taught school for some years and conducted business. In 1860, he moved to Illinois. He enlisted in Company G, 12th Illinois Infantry and served through the American Civil War, rising through the ranks to become a division commissary, serving with Sherman on the March to the Sea and the Carolina campaigns. After peace was restored, he moved to Davenport, Iowa, married and for several years was engaged in compiling and publishing county and State atlases, in partnership with John Milton Lyter, who became mayor in 1870. In 1875, he completed and published his greatest work, which was an Illustrated Historical Atlas of Iowa. It was accurate and became an official authority for real estate dealers, county and State officers. Although many made him substantial profit, others, including his Minnesota and Indiana atlases, were financial failures. Later Andreas moved to Chicago and organized the Western Historical Company, and took up historical writing, publishing a three-volume History of Chicago. He died at New Rochelle, New York, on February 10, 1900.

== Selected bibliography ==
- An illustrated historical atlas of Hancock County, Illinois (1874)
- An Illustrated Historical Atlas of the State of Minnesota (1874)
- Illustrated Historical Atlas of Iowa (1875)
- Illustrated historical atlas of the State of Indiana
- History of the State of Nebraska (1882)
- History of the State of Kansas (1883)
- History of Cook County Illinois (1884)
- Historical Atlas of Dakota (1884)
- History of Chicago History of Chicago (3 vols., 1884–86)<
