= Fort Calhoun, Nebraska =

City in Washington County, Nebraska, United States

- City
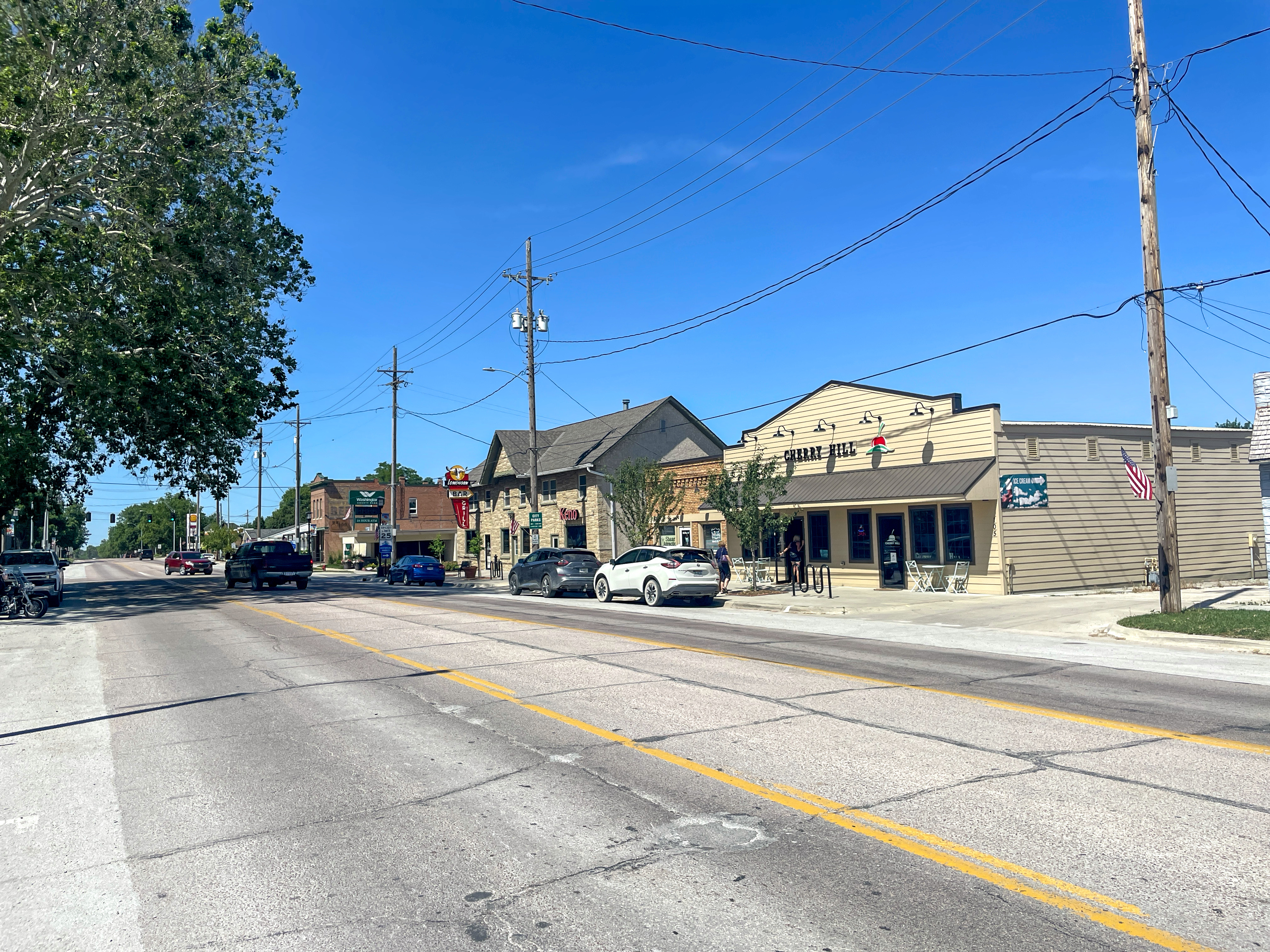
- Downtown Fort Calhoun along U.S. Route 75, June 2021

- Location of Fort Calhoun, Nebraska
- Coordinates: 41°27′22″N 96°01′35″W
- Country: United States
- State: Nebraska
- County: Washington

Area
  - Total: 0.68 sq mi (1.77 km^{2})
  - Land: 0.68 sq mi (1.77 km^{2})
  - Water: 0 sq mi (0.00 km^{2})
- Elevation: 1,099 ft (335 m)

Population (2020)
  - Total: 1,108
  - Density: 1,623.3/sq mi (626.75/km^{2})
- Time zone: UTC-6 (Central (CST))
  - Summer (DST): UTC-5 (CDT)
- ZIP code: 68023
- Area code: 402
- FIPS code: 31-17145
- GNIS feature ID: 2394795

Fort Calhoun is a city in Washington County, Nebraska, United States. The population was 1,108 at the 2020 census. The city includes Fort Atkinson, the first fort built west of the Missouri River.

== History ==
Fort Calhoun was platted in 1855. It was named for John C. Calhoun.

== Geography ==
According to the United States Census Bureau, the city has a total area of 0.65 square miles (1.68 km^{2}), all land.

=== Climate ===
Climate data for Fort Calhoun, NE (normals 2002-2023)
Month	Jan	Feb	Mar	Apr	May	Jun	Jul	Aug	Sep	Oct	Nov	Dec	Year
Mean maximum °F (°C)	52 (11)	57 (14)	74 (23)	85 (29)	89 (32)	93 (34)	95 (35)	94 (34)	91 (33)	84 (29)	71 (22)	57 (14)	95 (35)
Mean daily maximum °F (°C)	31.3 (−0.4)	33.6 (0.9)	48.4 (9.1)	62.1 (16.7)	70.8 (21.6)	82.0 (27.8)	84.6 (29.2)	82.9 (28.3)	76.1 (24.5)	62.0 (16.7)	49.1 (9.5)	35.2 (1.8)	59.8 (15.5)
Daily mean °F (°C)	22.5 (−5.3)	23.8 (−4.6)	38.1 (3.4)	50.5 (10.3)	60.6 (15.9)	72.1 (22.3)	73.7 (23.2)	73.2 (22.9)	65.2 (18.4)	51.5 (10.8)	38.9 (3.8)	26.7 (−2.9)	49.7 (9.9)
Mean daily minimum °F (°C)	13.7 (−10.2)	14.0 (−10.0)	27.9 (−2.3)	39.0 (3.9)	50.5 (10.3)	62.1 (16.7)	64.9 (18.3)	63.5 (17.5)	54.3 (12.4)	40.9 (4.9)	28.7 (−1.8)	18.2 (−7.7)	39.8 (4.3)
Mean minimum °F (°C)	−7 (−22)	−5 (−21)	9 (−13)	24 (−4)	37 (3)	52 (11)	57 (14)	56 (13)	43 (6)	26 (−3)	12 (−11)	−1 (−18)	−7 (−22)
Average precipitation inches (mm)	0.81 (21)	0.95 (24)	1.85 (47)	2.87 (73)	5.15 (131)	5.01 (127)	2.63 (67)	4.68 (119)	2.87 (73)	2.47 (63)	0.88 (22)	1.63 (41)	31.8 (808)
Average snowfall inches (cm)	9.5 (24)	7.9 (20)	3.8 (9.7)	1.0 (2.5)	0.0 (0.0)	0.0 (0.0)	0.0 (0.0)	0.0 (0.0)	0.0 (0.0)	0.9 (2.3)	1.2 (3.0)	6.0 (15)	30.3 (76.5)
Average extreme snow depth inches (cm)	6 (15)	7 (18)	4 (10)	1 (2.5)	0 (0)	0 (0)	0 (0)	0 (0)	0 (0)	0 (0)	1 (2.5)	4 (10)	7 (18)
Average precipitation days (≥ 0.01 in)	6	5	7	9	12	9	7	10	6	7	4	5	87
Average snowy days (≥ 0.1 in)	4	4	2	0	0	0	0	0	0	0	1	3	14
Source: NOAA

== Demographics ==
Historical population
Census	Pop.	Note	%±
1870	236		—
1880	240		1.7%
1900	346		—
1910	324		−6.4%
1920	309		−4.6%
1930	309		0.0%
1940	329		6.5%
1950	314		−4.6%
1960	458		45.9%
1970	642		40.2%
1980	641		−0.2%
1990	648		1.1%
2000	856		32.1%
2010	908		6.1%
2020	1,108		22.0%
U.S. Decennial Census

=== 2010 census ===
As of the census of 2010, there were 908 people, 391 households, and 253 families living in the city. The population density was 1,396.9 inhabitants per square mile (539.3/km^{2}). There were 413 housing units at an average density of 635.4 per square mile (245.3/km^{2}). The racial makeup of the city was 96.7% White, 0.2% African American, 0.2% Native American, 0.1% Asian, 0.1% Pacific Islander, 0.7% from other races, and 2.0% from two or more races. Hispanic or Latino of any race were 3.2% of the population.

There were 391 households, of which 28.4% had children under the age of 18 living with them, 49.9% were married couples living together, 11.0% had a female householder with no husband present, 3.8% had a male householder with no wife present, and 35.3% were non-families. 32.7% of all households were made up of individuals, and 15.3% had someone living alone who was 65 years of age or older. The average household size was 2.32 and the average family size was 2.95.

The median age in the city was 41.4 years. 24.9% of residents were under the age of 18; 4.6% were between the ages of 18 and 24; 24.1% were from 25 to 44; 30.8% were from 45 to 64; and 15.7% were 65 years of age or older. The gender makeup of the city was 51.4% male and 48.6% female.

=== 2000 census ===
As of the census of 2000, there were 856 people, 342 households, and 229 families living in the city. The population density was 1,380.5 inhabitants per square mile (533.0/km^{2}). There were 375 housing units at an average density of 604.8 per square mile (233.5/km^{2}). The racial makeup of the city was 98.48% White, 0.58% African American, 0.12% Native American, 0.12% from other races, and 0.70% from two or more races. Hispanic or Latino of any race were 1.29% of the population.

There were 342 households, out of which 36.3% had children under the age of 18 living with them, 54.7% were married couples living together, 8.8% had a female householder with no husband present, and 33.0% were non-families. 30.4% of all households were made up of individuals, and 15.5% had someone living alone who was 65 years of age or older. The average household size was 2.50 and the average family size was 3.16.

In the city, the population was spread out, with 27.9% under the age of 18, 7.6% from 18 to 24, 27.3% from 25 to 44, 22.7% from 45 to 64, and 14.5% who were 65 years of age or older. The median age was 37 years. For every 100 females, there were 94.5 males. For every 100 females age 18 and over, there were 87.5 males.

As of 2000 the median income for a household in the city was $41,500, and the median income for a family was $57,679. Males had a median income of $36,250 versus $25,000 for females. The per capita income for the city was $20,779. About 3.1% of families and 3.8% of the population were below the poverty line, including 4.1% of those under the age of 18 and 6.0% of those 65 and older.

== See also ==
- List of municipalities in Nebraska
- Washington County Historical Association
- National Register of Historic Places listings in Washington County, Nebraska
