= U.S. Route 136 in Nebraska =

Segment of American highway

U.S. Highway 136
- US 136 highlighted in red

Route information
- Maintained by NDOT
- Length: 239.88 mi (386.05 km)
- Existed: 1960–present
- Tourist routes: Heritage Highway

Major junctions
- West end: US 6 / US 34 near Edison
- US 183 in Alma; US 281 in Red Cloud; US 81 in Hebron; US 77 in Beatrice; US 75 in Auburn
- East end: US 136 at the Missouri state line in Brownville

Location
- Country: United States
- State: Nebraska
- Counties: Furnas, Harlan, Franklin, Webster, Nuckolls, Thayer, Jefferson, Gage, Johnson, Nemaha

Highway system
- United States Numbered Highway System; List; Special; Divided; Nebraska State Highway System; Interstate; US; State; Link; Spur; State Spurs; Recreation
← N-133	→ N-137

U.S. Highway 136 is a part of the United States Numbered Highway System that runs for 804 miles (1,294 km) between Edison, Nebraska and Speedway, Indiana. It is a spur route of US 36 despite never intersecting its parent. Within the State of Nebraska it is a state highway that begins at a junction with US 6 and US 34 north of Edison and travels east across the southern part of the state to the Nebraska–Missouri state line in Brownville along the banks of the Missouri River. Throughout its 239.88-mile (386.05 km) length, the highway is known as the Heritage Highway, one of nine scenic byways in the state. The highway travels across the grassland prairies of southern Nebraska to the woods of the Missouri River Valley encountering winding rivers, farmlands, and historic settlements. These landscapes were featured in stories from Pulitzer Prize-winning author Willa Cather recounting life on the Nebraska Plains during the end of the 19th century. For its entire length, US 136 is a two-lane highway with the exception of a 0.51-mile (0.82 km) stretch of divided highway within Fairbury.

== Route description ==
=== Edison to Republican City ===
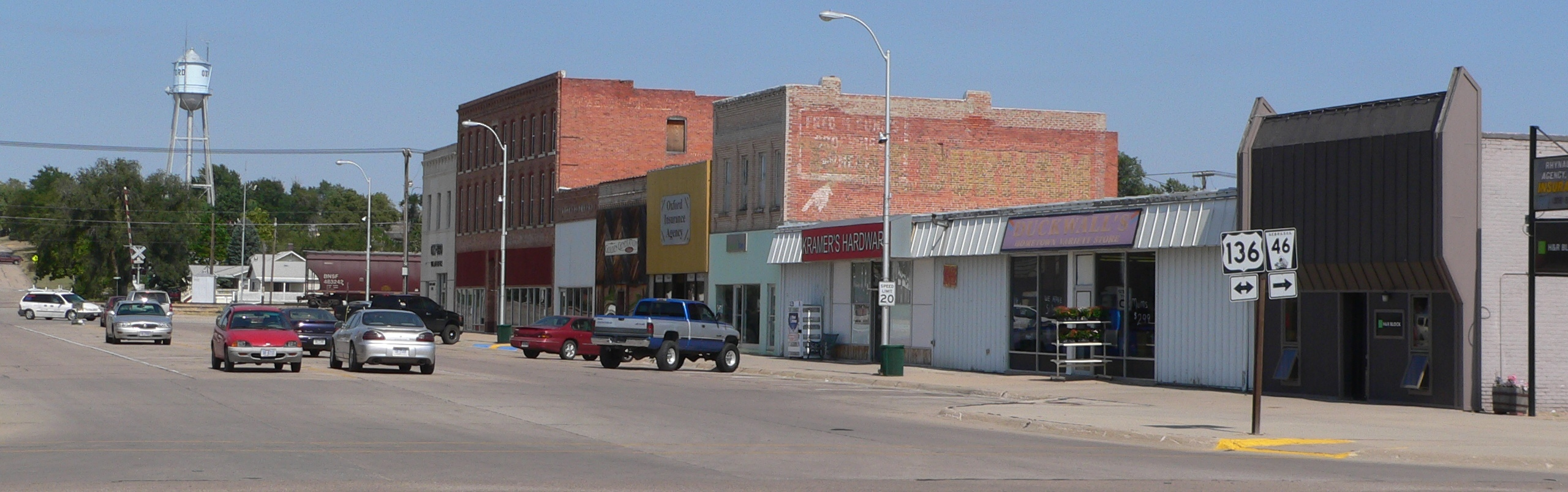
US 136 and N-46 junction in downtown Oxford

US 136 begins north of Edison at a junction with US 6 and US 34. The highway heads south into Edison within the Republican River Valley. The highway leaves Edison headed east before turning to the southeast as it runs parallel to the river through agricultural fields on its way to Oxford. Here it runs along the south side of the village and comes to an intersection with N-46 which it runs concurrently with for several blocks. On the southeast side of Oxford, the two highways diverge and US 136 continues southeast. As the highway approaches Orleans it meets up with N-89 for 0.52 miles (0.84 km) into town. Near the center of Orleans, N-89 departs to the south while US 136 continues east out of town. After 4.21 miles (6.78 km) of eastward travel, the highway comes to a junction with US 183. Together, both highways head south into Alma. Alma is home to the Harlan County Reservoir. This 13,250-acre (5,360 ha) reservoir is one of the largest bodies of water within the North American Central Flyway and is a primary stopping point during migration for millions of birds including bald eagles, golden eagles, pelicans, osprey, ducks, geese, and gulls. The highway continues east through vast fields before entering Republican City. Just south of the city is the Harlan County Reservoir Dam, accessible by Corps Road A. The dam was built in 1952 to prevent large scale flooding in the Republican River Valley similar to the 1935 Republican River Floods.

=== Republican City to Hebron ===
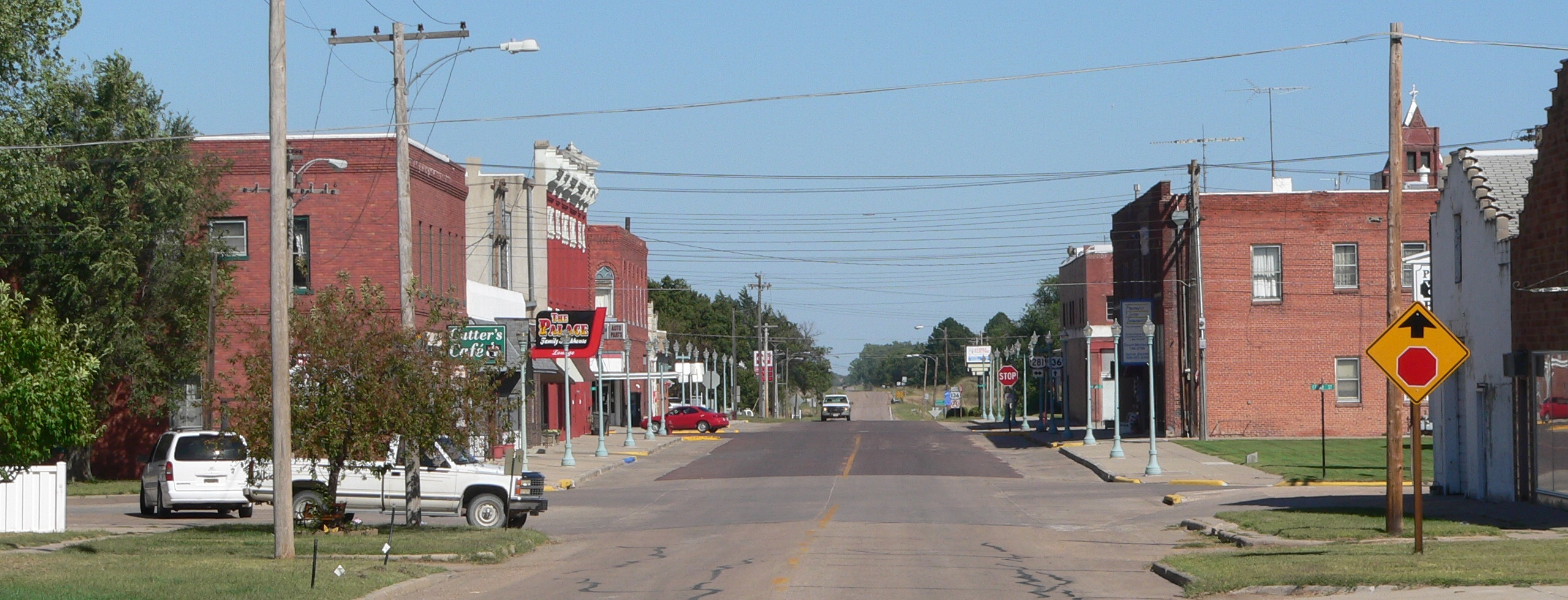
Looking east along US 136 in Red Cloud, Nebraska

From Republican City the US 136 continues east along the northern bluffs of the Republican River as it passes to the north of the small communities Naponee and Bloomington. The highway then comes to a junction with N-10 on the north side of Franklin. The two routes run south, concurrently, for a half mile (0.80 km) to the center of town there N-10 continues south and US 136 diverges to the east. The highway then continues east for another 10 miles (16 km) before entering Riverton, a small village on the Republican River. The highway continues east passing the community of Inavale before arriving at an intersection with US 281 in the Webster County seat of Red Cloud. Red Cloud was an important pioneer community as eight passenger trains per day passed through its train depot. It was also the childhood home of author Willa Cather whose early novels recounted life during the homestead frontier in the late 19th century. Her childhood home is one block south of US 136 on Cedar Street. The highway leaves Red Cloud, continuing due east for about 10 miles (16 km) before coming to an intersection with N-78 just north of Guide Rock. US 136 then continues due east through corn, sorghum, soybean, and wheat fields for the next 14 miles (23 km) before meeting up with N-14 north of Superior. The two highways run concurrently to the north for 4 miles (6.4 km) before US 136 breaks off and continues its easterly trek. The highway then passes the communities of Nora and Ruskin before arriving in Deshler at an intersection with N-5. Deshler was home to one of the nation's largest broom factory in the 1950s and 1960s. The highway continues to the east, running parallel to Spring Creek as it approaches an intersection with US 81 just south of Hebron, home to the world's largest porch swing.

=== Hebron to Beatrice ===
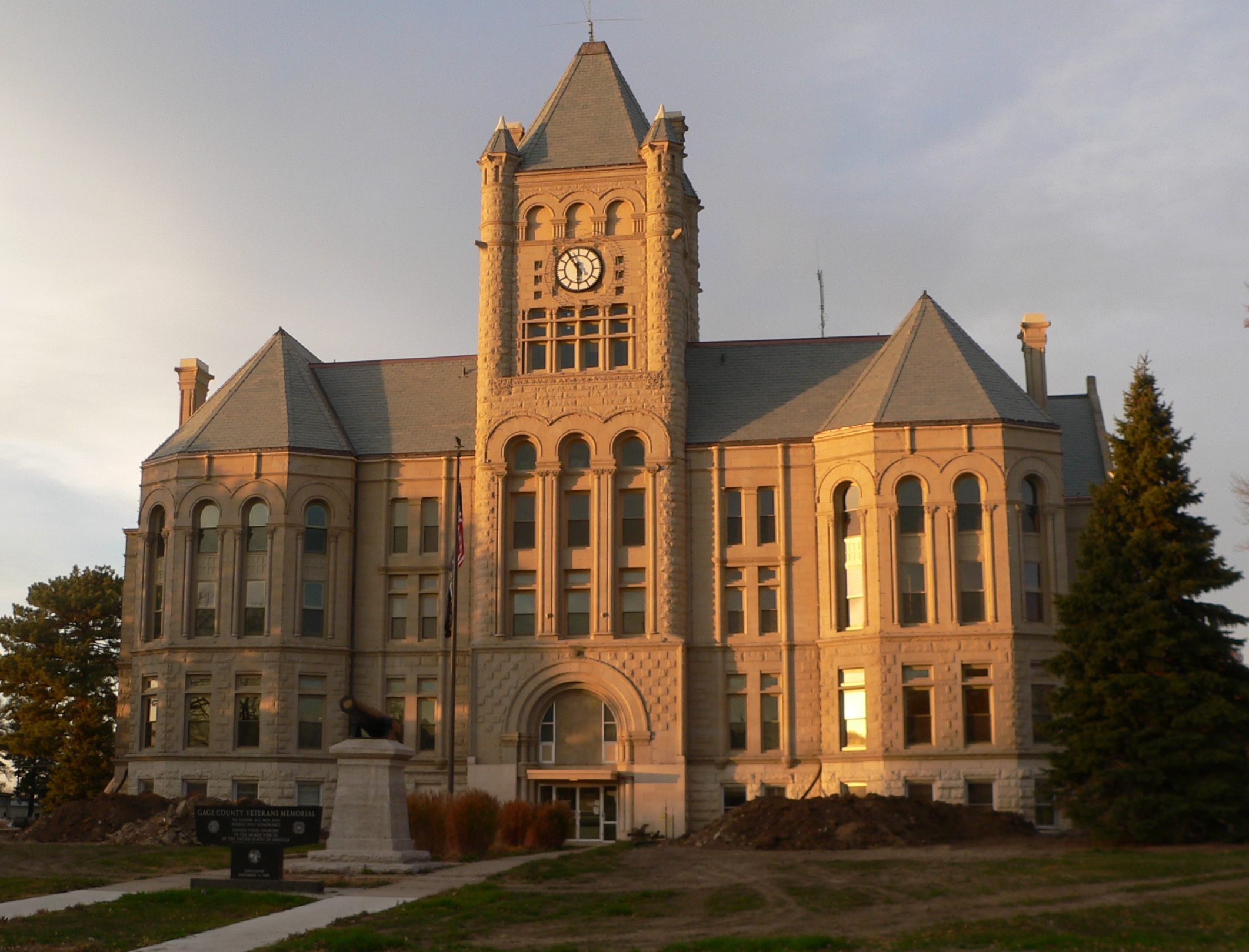
Gage County Courthouse in Beatrice, Nebraska along 6th St six blocks north of US 136

After passing Hebron to the south, the highway continues on its easterly heading. For the next 20 miles (32 km), the highway continues to pass through the vast agricultural fields of southeastern Nebraska. Included in this stretch is the small community of Gilead, which the highway passes to its south. Just east of Gilead, the highway comes to an intersection with N-53 which heads to the north towards Alexandria. Continuing east the highway crosses the Little Blue River before entering the city of Fairbury. Fairbury was the home of the Western Division headquarters of the Rock Island Railroad until 1965. The Rock Island Depot was constructed in 1913 at a cost of $40,000 (equivalent to $957,180 in 2025) to accommodate increased passenger and freight loads. The depot is an example of Renaissance Revival architecture with brick pilasters topped with stone trim, a hipped roof of red clay tile, overhanging eaves and decorative brackets. On the east side of the city, US 136 intersects N-15 before exiting Fairbury to the northeast. After leaving Fairbury, the highway begins to meander in a general northeasterly direction, a stark contrast to its almost due east path prior. It passes through the south end of Jansen then the north sides of the small communities of Harbine and Ellis before swinging to the north before it enters the city of Beatrice. The highway then turns back to the east and comes to an intersection with N-4. The two highways then head east into the heart of Beatrice. When the Homestead Act went into effect on January 1, 1963, Daniel Freeman persuaded a clerk to open the local Land Office so he could make a claim for a homestead 4 miles (6.4 km) west of Beatrice. In 1936, Congress dedicated the Homestead National Monument of America on the site of Freeman's claim.

=== Beatrice to Missouri ===
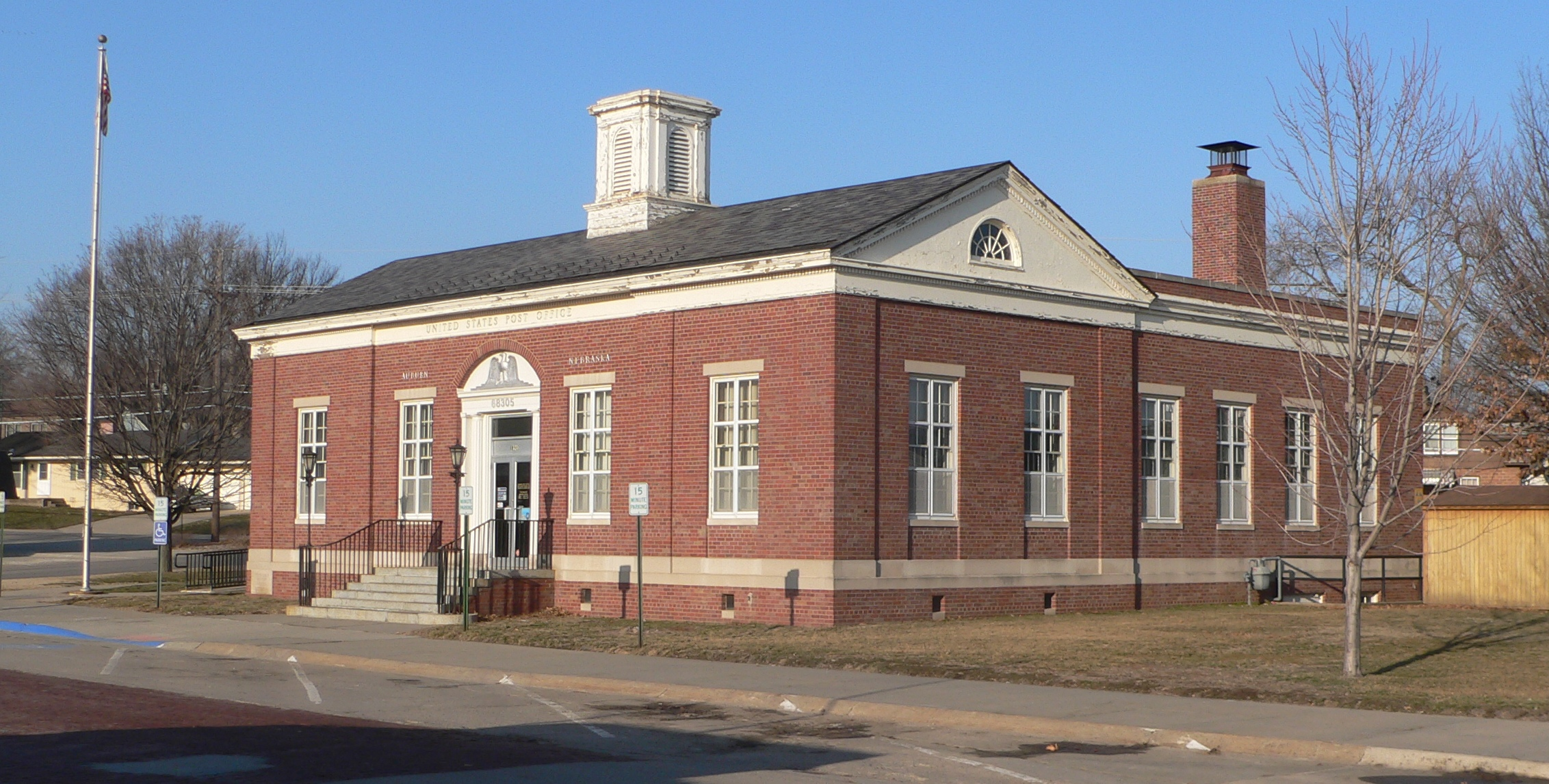
Auburn, Nebraska Post Office

After leaving Beatrice, US 136 and N-4 run concurrently for 7.89 miles (12.70 km), diverging southwest of Filley. Here, N-4 heads east towards Virginia and Lewiston while US 136 continues into Filley. The highway then continues into Johnson County where it begins to parallel Yankee Creek as it passes the communities of Crab Orchard and Vesta before entering the city of Tecumseh. On the east side of Tecumseh, the highway has an intersection with N-50 before continuing on to the east. For the next 8.5 miles (13.7 km) the highway travels through rural agricultural fields before entering Nemaha County and meeting up with N-105 south of Johnson. The two highways travel, together, north for about one mile (1.6 km) where US 136 heads to the east again. The highway travels east for another 8.5 miles (13.7 km) where it enters the city of Auburn. The post office in Auburn features a painting in the lobby that was part of a WPA project commissioned by President Franklin D. Roosevelt, one of twelve paintings in the state. In the center of Auburn, the highway intersects US 75 before continuing on to the east. US 136 travels 5.52 miles (8.88 km) east before coming to an intersection with N-67. The two highways travel concurrently to the east for 2.6 miles (4.2 km) before N-67 departs to the south on its way to Nemaha. Meanwhile, US 136 begins a slight descent into Brownville as it travels down rolling loess hills into the Missouri River Valley. The town overlooks a campsite used by the Lewis and Clark Expedition on July 15, 1804. The highway then crosses the Brownville Bridge over the Missouri River and continues into Missouri.

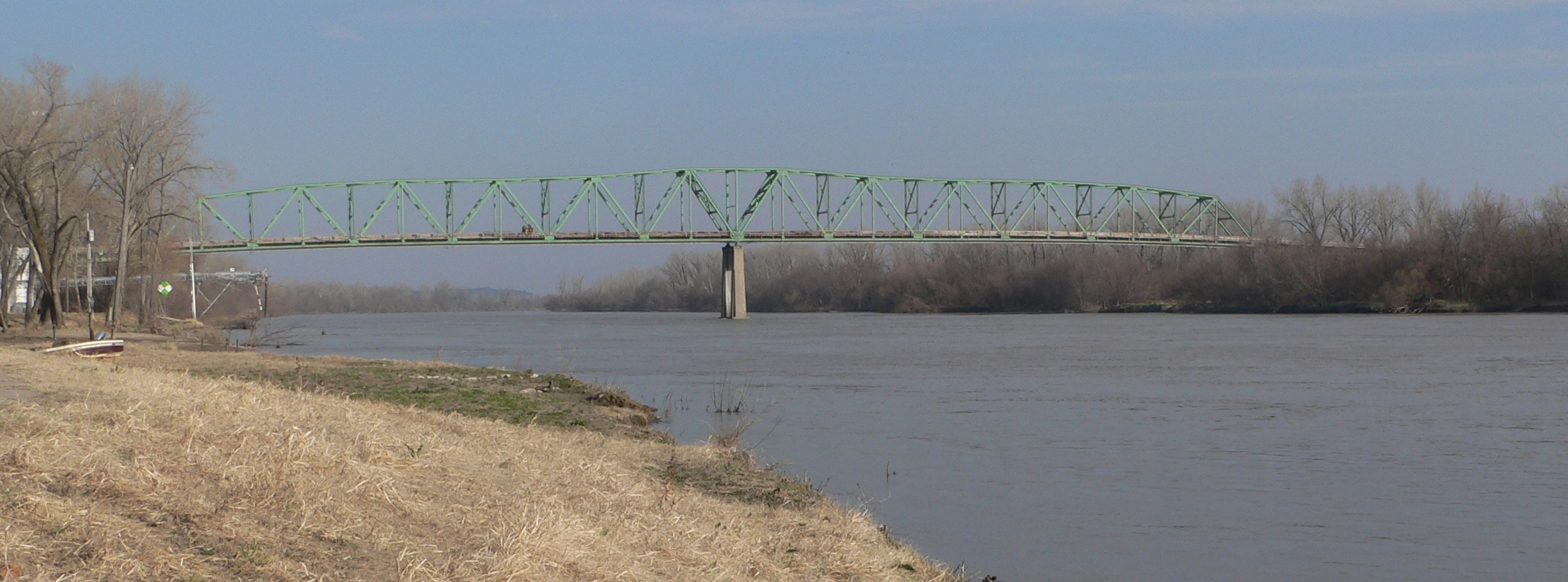
Brownville Bridge carrying US 136 across the Missouri River

== History ==
=== Historic trails ===
Prior to the automobile, travel across Nebraska was accomplished via old Indian trails and primitive territorial roads. The Oregon, California, and Mormon trails were popular overland routes across Nebraska for westward travel and was also a primary route for the Pony Express. The Oregon, California and Pony Express routes entered Nebraska in Jefferson County southeast of Fairbury and followed the Little Blue River to Rock Creek Station east of Fairbury. The trails then traveled in a generally west-northwest direction towards the Platte River valley and Fort Kearney. The section of these trails across Jefferson and Thayer County generally paralleled the present day US 136 corridor within a few miles to its north.

=== Omaha-Lincoln-Denver Highway ===
1926 style Nebraska Highway 3 marker

In 1911, the opening of the Omaha-Lincoln-Denver (O-L-D) route introduced one of the primary east–west routes across southern Nebraska. This route traveled along and near the present day US 6 corridor. However, for a brief section between Edison and Oxford the O-L-D traveled along the present day US 136 corridor. From Arapahoe, the O-L-D followed along Chestnut Street, which is the modern day alignment of US 6 and US 34. From there it traveled south and east to Edison. The highway entered Edison along the line common to sections 27 and 34, which is now Second Street. At the intersection of Main Street and Second Street the O-L-D met up with the present day alignment of US 136. The highway continued east out of Edison for about 1.5 miles (2.4 km) before turning south for one mile (1.6 km) along present day Road 432. It then traveled east for 3 miles (4.8 km) along Road 720. From here it followed the present day alignment of US 136 into Oxford just south of the Chicago, Burlington and Quincy Railroad. In Oxford the highway bent south around a stock yard then along South Railway Street where it turned north to cross the railroad along Ogden Street before turning back southeast along South Railway Street. It paralleled the tracks until Cornwall Street where it resumed due east travel. This marked the point where O-L-D left the present day US 136 corridor to continue on towards Lincoln.

=== State highway system ===
In 1921, one of the predecessor routes to modern day US 136 in Nebraska was designated N-67 between Culbertson and Oxford, this route followed the present day alignment of US 6 and US 34 and was also part of the Omaha-Lincoln-Denver highway. In 1925 much of the route occupied by present-day US 136 was redesignated as Nebraska Highway 3. This former route traversed the state from the Colorado state line west of Haigler to Brownville where it crossed the Missouri River via a tolled ferry route. The segment of N-3 west of Edison followed the present day alignment of US 34 and was redesignated as such in 1939. In 1951, US 136 was designated along its present-day alignment between St. Joseph, Missouri and Indianapolis, Indiana. It wasn't until 1960 when the highway was extended west and replaced the remaining portion of N-3 between Edison and Brownville. Since US 136 was extended into Nebraska, the N-3 designation was decommissioned and hasn't been used since. The route of US 136 has remained relatively unchanged since it was designated in 1960.

== Junction list ==
County	Location	mi	km	Destinations	Notes
Furnas		0.00	0.00	US 6 / US 34 – Holdrege, McCook	National western terminus
Furnas	Oxford	9.98	16.06	N-46 south (Ogden Street)	Western end of N-46 overlap
Harlan	Oxford	10.41	16.75	N-46 north	Eastern end of N-46 overlap
Harlan		22.20	35.73	N-89 west	Western end of N-89 overlap
Harlan	Orleans	22.72	36.56	N-89 east	Eastern end of N-61 overlap
Harlan		27.36	44.03	US 183 north - Holdrege	Western end of US 183 overlap
Harlan	Alma	29.39	47.30	US 183 south - Hays	Eastern end of US 183 overlap
Franklin		41.61	66.96	S-31C south	
Franklin		50.63	81.48	L-31D east	Western terminus of L-31D
Franklin	Franklin	51.63	83.09	N-10 north - Kearney	Western end of N-10 overlap
Franklin	Franklin	52.13	83.90	N-10 south (16th Street) / L-31D west (M Street)	Eastern end of N-10 overlap; eastern terminus of L-31D
Webster	Red Cloud	75.25	121.10	US 281 (Webster Street) - Hastings, Grand Island, Smith Center	
Webster		85.28	137.24	N-78	
Nuckolls		99.19	159.63	N-14 south - Beloit	Western end of N-14 overlap
Nuckolls		103.20	166.08	N-14 north - Clay Center, Aurora	Eastern end of N-14 overlap
Thayer		121.20	195.05	N-5 north / Oregon National Historic Trail / California National Historic Trail / Pony Express National Historic Trail	
Thayer		121.45	195.45	S-85E south	
Thayer		128.26	206.41	L-85F south	
Thayer		129.54	208.47	US 81 - York, Salina	
Thayer		139.30	224.18	N-53 north	
Jefferson	Fairbury	150.78	242.66	N-15 (K Street) / Oregon National Historic Trail / California National Historic Trail / Pony Express National Historic Trail	
Jefferson		164.57	264.85	N-103 south	
Gage	Beatrice	176.02	283.28	N-4 west (Sherman Street)	Western end of N-4 overlap
Gage	Beatrice	177.52	285.69	US 77 (6th Street) - Lincoln, Marysville	
Gage		187.51	301.77	N-4 east	Eastern end of N-4 overlap
Johnson		196.29	315.90	S-49C east	
Johnson	Tecumseh	211.03	339.62	N-50 (12th Street)	
Nemaha		219.99	354.04	N-105 south	Western end of N-105 overlap
Nemaha		220.84	355.41	N-105 north	Eastern end of N-105 overlap
Nemaha	Auburn	229.78	369.80	US 75 (J Street) - Omaha, Topeka	
Nemaha		235.80	379.48	N-67 north	Western end of N-67 overlap
Nemaha		238.40	383.67	N-67 south	Eastern end of N-67 overlap
Missouri River		239.88	386.05	Brownville Bridge; Nebraska–Missouri line	
Missouri River				US 136 east – Rock Port, to Interstate 29	Continuation into Missouri
1.000 mi = 1.609 km; 1.000 km = 0.621 mi: Concurrency terminus

U.S. Route 136
Previous state: Terminus	Nebraska	Next state: Missouri
