= Nebraska Highway 4 =

State highway in Nebraska, U.S.

State Highway 4

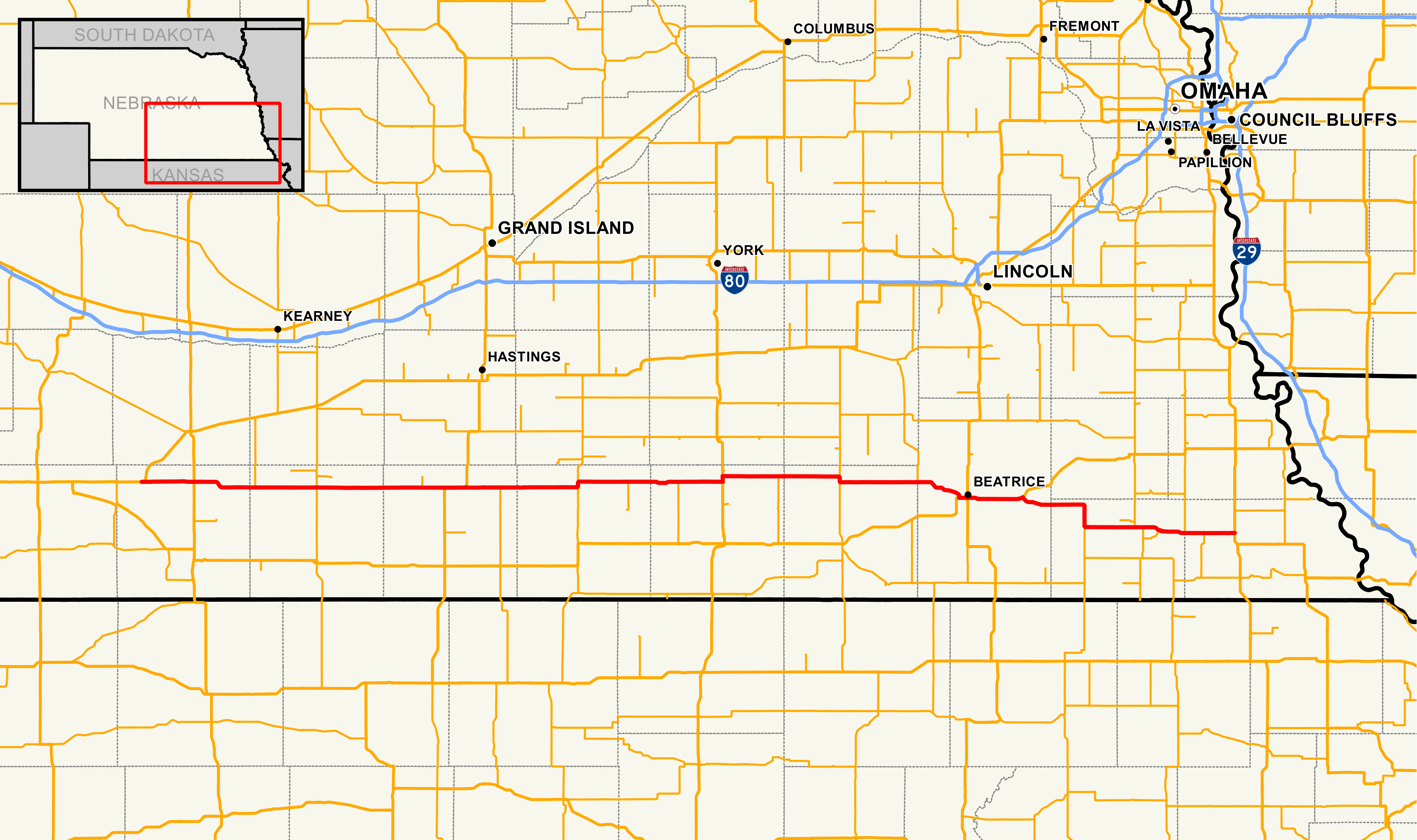
- Nebraska Highway 4 highlighted in red

Route information
- Maintained by NDOT
- Length: 205.48 mi (330.69 km)

Major junctions
- West end: US 6 / US 34 southwest of Atlanta
- US 183 west of Ragan; US 281 southwest of Blue Hill; N-14 southwest of Edgar; US 81 southwest of Bruning; N-15 east of Daykin; US 136 in Beatrice; US 77 in Beatrice; N-105 in Humboldt
- East end: US 75 north of Dawson

Location
- Country: United States
- State: Nebraska
- Counties: Harlan, Franklin, Webster, Nuckolls, Thayer, Jefferson, Gage, Pawnee, Richardson

Highway system
- Nebraska State Highway System; Interstate; US; State; Link; Spur; State Spurs; Recreation
← N-2	→ N-5

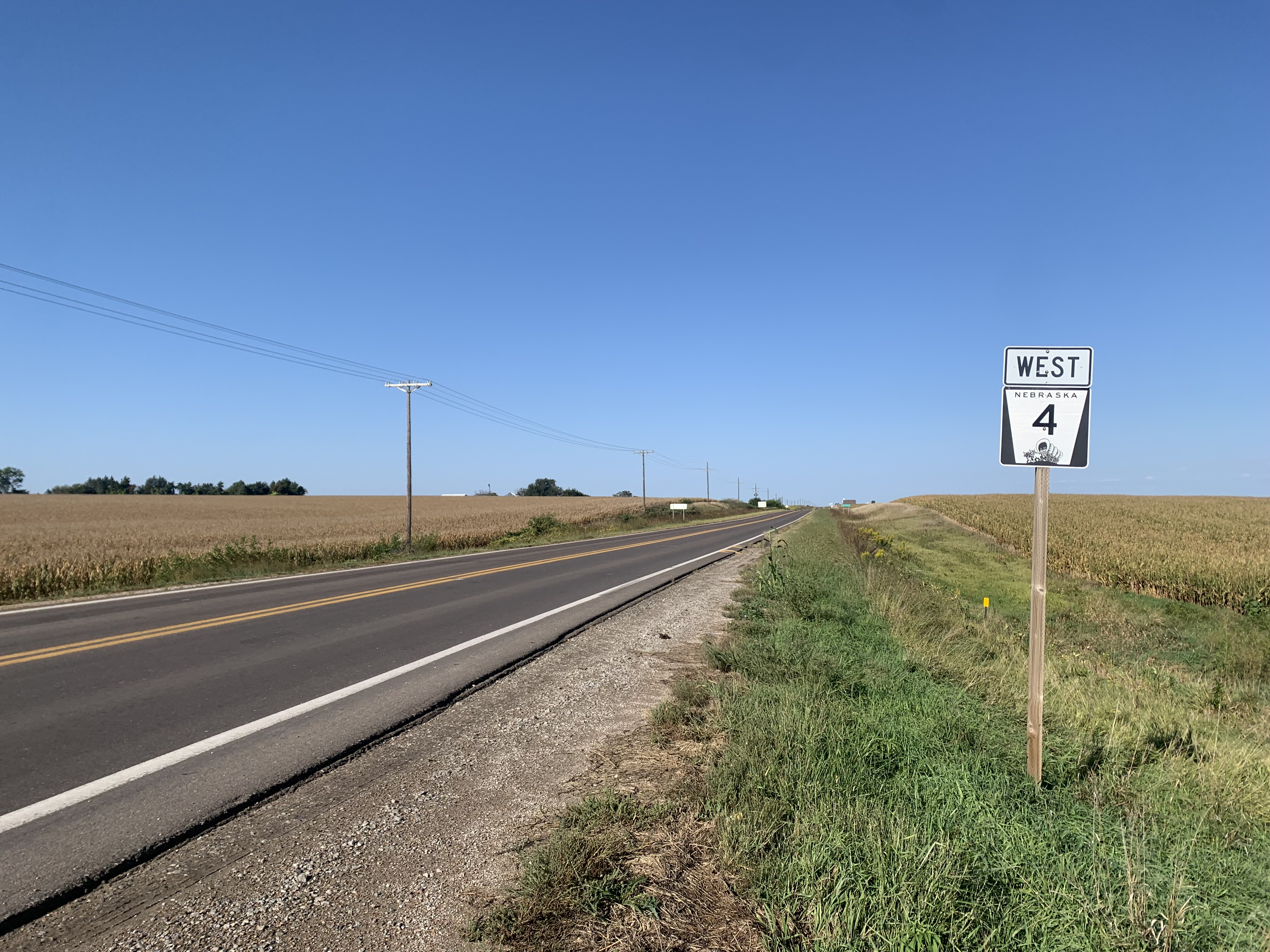
Nebraska Highway 4 in Jefferson County, Nebraska

Nebraska Highway 4 is a highway in Nebraska. The entirety of the route is in Nebraska's southern tier of counties. Beatrice is the only city with over 1,000 in population on the highway. Its western terminus is at an intersection with US 6 and US 34 southwest of Atlanta. Its eastern terminus is at an intersection with US 75 north of Dawson.

== Route description ==
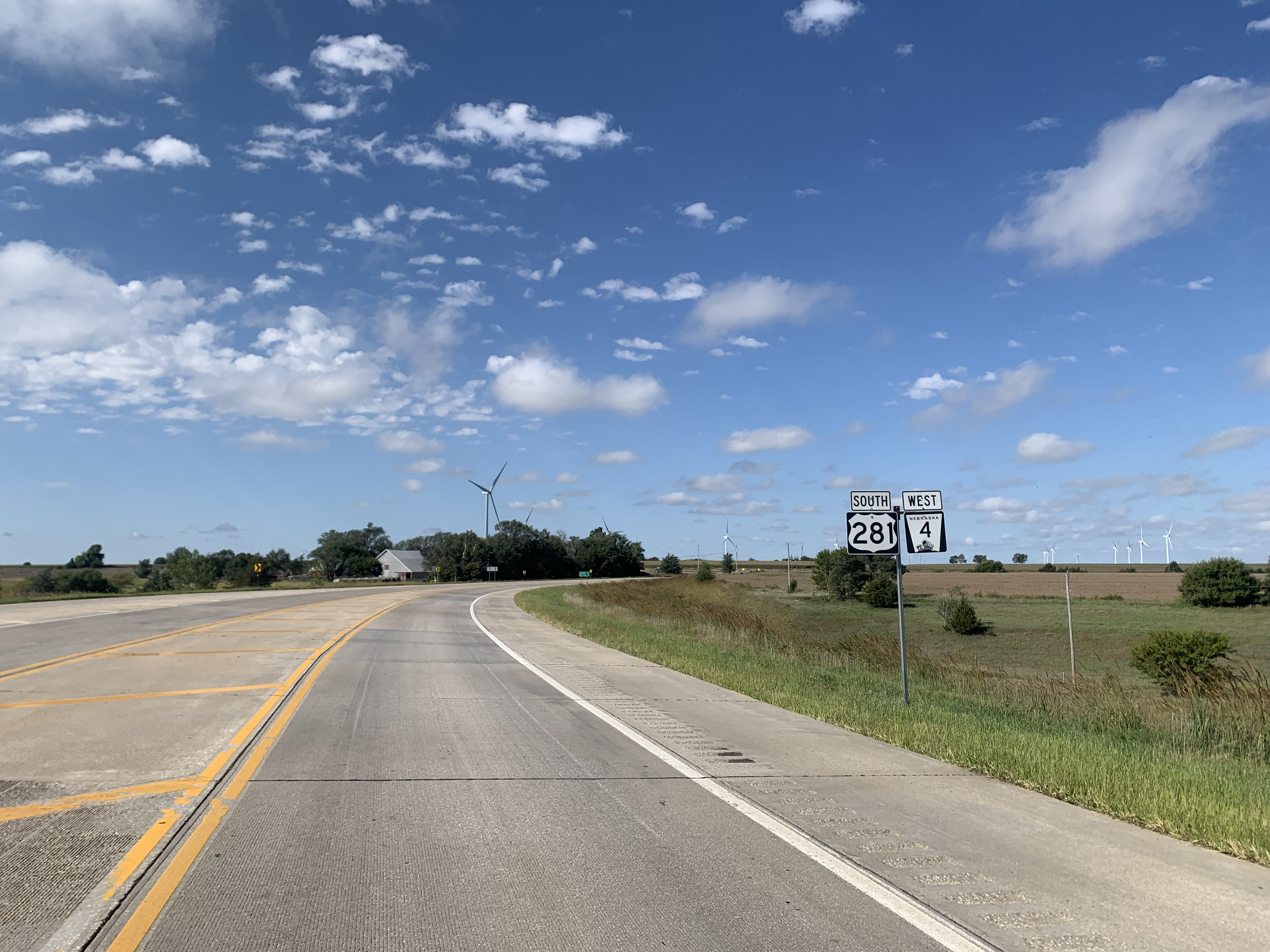
US Highway 281 in Webster County, Nebraska

Nebraska Highway 4 begins at an intersection near around the Atlanta area with U.S. Highways 6 and 34. It proceeds east into farmland and meets U.S. Highway 183 near Ragan. It then passes through Ragan and Campbell and meets US 281 in northern Webster County. It overlaps US 281 for 4 miles (6.4 km) and separates south of Blue Hill. It continues through Lawrence, is briefly concurrent with Nebraska Highway 14 and continues straight east through Davenport and Carleton until it meets US 81. It continues north for one mile (1.6 km) with US 81 and separates at Bruning. It goes east through Daykin and is briefly concurrent with Nebraska Highway 15 for one mile (1.6 km). It passes through Plymouth, Nebraska, passes near the Homestead National Monument and meets US 136 on the west edge of Beatrice. It is concurrent with US 136 through Beatrice and the two routes separate near Filley. It turns briefly southeast toward Virginia and Lewiston, and briefly turns south until it meets NE 99. It turns east, briefly overlaps Nebraska Highway 50 and continues east toward Table Rock. At Table Rock, it intersects NE 65 and continues eastward through Humboldt until it ends at U.S. Highway 75 near Dawson.

== Major intersections ==
County	Location	mi	km	Destinations	Notes
Harlan		0.00	0.00	US 6 / US 34 – Holdrege, McCook	Western terminus
Harlan		9.38	15.10	US 183 – Holdrege, Alma	
Franklin		20.78	33.44	N-44 north – Wilcox	
Franklin		31.80	51.18	N-10 – Minden, Franklin	
Webster	Bladen	50.71	81.61	S-91A north	
Webster		54.86	88.29	US 281 south – Red Cloud	West end of US 281 overlap
Webster		58.55	94.23	US 281 north – Hastings	East end of US 281 overlap
Webster		64.76	104.22	N-78 south – Guide Rock	
Nuckolls		78.68	126.62	N-14 south	West end of NE 14 overlap
Nuckolls		79.69	128.25	N-14 north / Oregon National Historic Trail / California National Historic Trail / Pony Express National Historic Trail – Clay Center	East end of NE 14 overlap
Nuckolls	Oak	88.71	142.76	S-65A south	
Thayer	Carleton	97.77	157.35	N-5 south / Oregon National Historic Trail / California National Historic Trail / Pony Express National Historic Trail – Deshler	
Thayer		105.71	170.12	US 81 south – Hebron	West end of US 81 overlap
Thayer		106.72	171.75	US 81 north – Geneva	East end of US 81 overlap
Thayer	Daykin	116.69	187.79	N-53 south – Alexandria	
Jefferson		127.66	205.45	N-15 north (568th Avenue) – Fairbury	West end of NE 15 overlap
Jefferson		128.66	207.06	N-15 south (568th Avenue) – Seward	East end of NE 15 overlap
Gage		142.72	229.69	N-103 north – De Witt, Wilber	
Gage	Beatrice	151.27	243.45	US 136 west (West Court Street) – Fairbury	West end of US 136 overlap
Gage	Beatrice	152.72	245.78	US 77 (6th Street) – Lincoln, Wymore	
Gage		162.76	261.94	US 136 east – Tecumseh	East end of US 136 overlap
Pawnee	Lewiston	171.43	275.89	S-67A south	
Pawnee		178.18	286.75	N-99 south – Burchard, Pawnee City	
Pawnee		187.26	301.37	N-50 north – Tecumseh	West end of NE 50 overlap
Pawnee		188.49	303.35	N-50 south – Pawnee City	East end of NE 50 overlap
Pawnee		188.67	303.63	L-67E south	
Pawnee	Table Rock	192.24	309.38	N-65 south (Grand Street)	
Pawnee		196.52	316.27	N-105 north – Johnson	West end of NE 105 overlap
Richardson	Humboldt	199.99	321.85	N-105 south (Nemaha Street)	East end of NE 105 overlap
Richardson		205.48	330.69	US 75 – Omaha, Falls City	Eastern terminus
1.000 mi = 1.609 km; 1.000 km = 0.621 mi: Concurrency terminus
