= Nebraska Highway 53 =

State highway in Nebraska, U.S.

State Highway 53

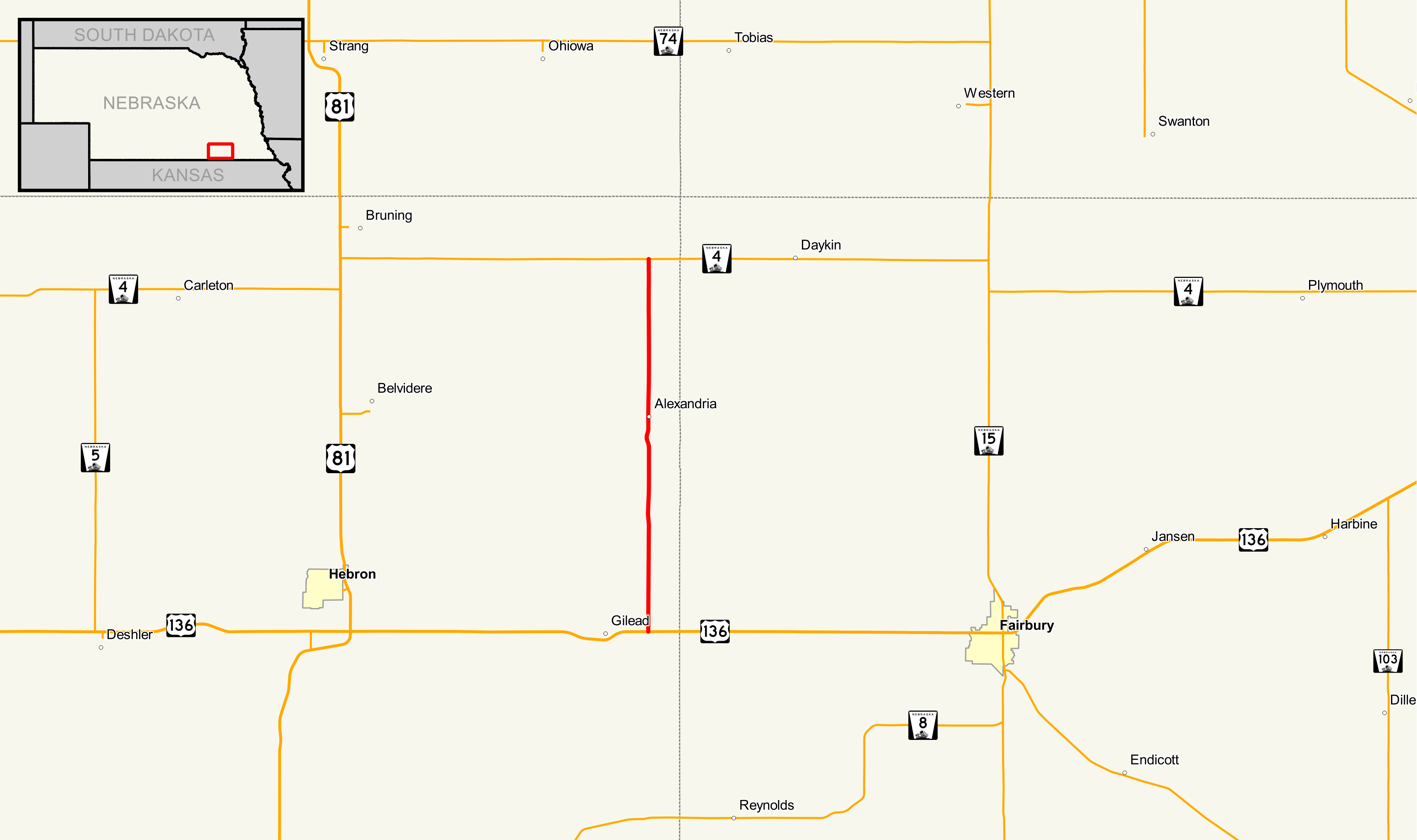
- Nebraska Highway 53 highlighted in red

Route information
- Maintained by NDOT
- Length: 12.04 mi (19.38 km)
- Existed: January 1, 1975–present

Major junctions
- South end: US 136 east of Gilead
- North end: N-4 west of Daykin

Location
- Country: United States
- State: Nebraska
- Counties: Thayer

Highway system
- Nebraska State Highway System; Interstate; US; State; Link; Spur; State Spurs; Recreation
← N-52	→ N-56

Nebraska Highway 53 is a highway in southern Nebraska. It is a north–south highway which runs for 12 miles (19 km). It has a southern terminus at U.S. 136 east of Gilead, and a northern terminus west of Daykin at Nebraska Highway 4.

== Route description ==
Nebraska Highway 53 begins one mile (1.6 km) east of Gilead at U.S. 136. It proceeds north through farmland and crosses the Little Blue River before entering Alexandria. From Alexandria, it continues north until NE 4, where it ends.

== History ==
Highway 53 was originally numbered Highway 76 until January 1, 1975, when it was redesignated to avoid confusion with Interstate 76 (formerly Interstate 80S).

== Major intersections ==
The entire route is in Thayer County.

Location	mi	km	Destinations	Notes
Gilead	0.00	0.00	US 136	Southern terminus
Daykin	12.04	19.38	N-4	Northern terminus
1.000 mi = 1.609 km; 1.000 km = 0.621 mi
