= Nebraska Highway 5 =

State highway in Nebraska, U.S.

State Highway 5

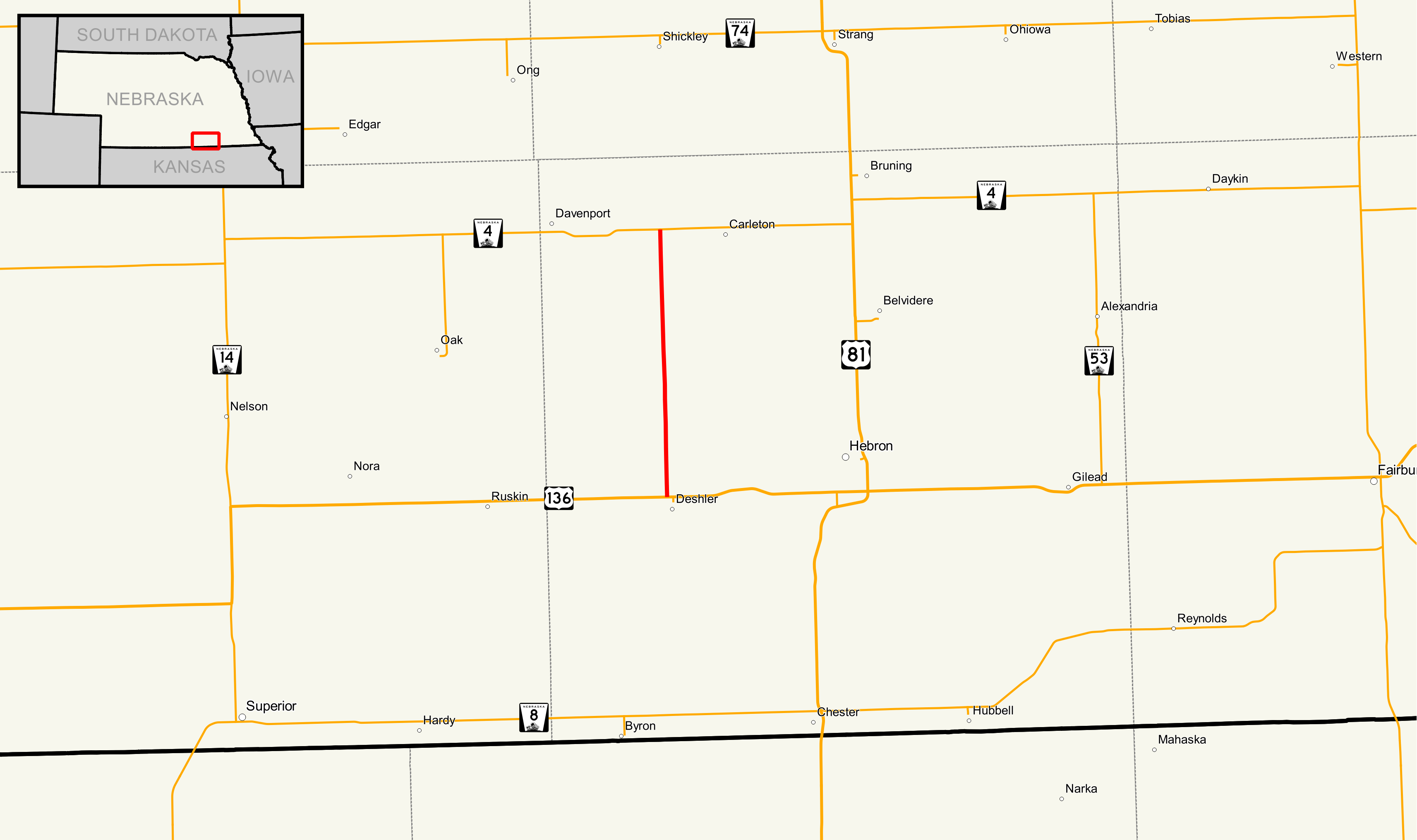
- Nebraska Highway 5 highlighted in red

Route information
- Maintained by NDOT
- Length: 11.04 mi (17.77 km)
- Existed: 1940–present

Major junctions
- South end: US 136 north of Deshler
- North end: N-4 west of Carleton

Location
- Country: United States
- State: Nebraska
- Counties: Thayer

Highway system
- Nebraska State Highway System; Interstate; US; State; Link; Spur; State Spurs; Recreation
← N-4	→ US 6

Nebraska Highway 5 (N-5) is a 11.04-mile (17.77 km) state highway in Thayer County, Nebraska, United States, that connects U.S. Route 136 (US 136), just north of Deshler, with Nebraska Highway 4 (N-4), between Davenport and Carleton. N-5 is entirely a two-lane road that runs through rural agricultural area and is part of three National Historic Trails: the Oregon National Historic Trail, the California National Historic Trail, and the Pony Express National Historic Trail.

== Route description ==
N-5 begins at an intersection with US 136 and 1st Street, immediately north of the northern city limits of Deshler. (US 136 heads east [along with the three historic trails] to quickly connect with the north end of Nebraska Spur 85E and on toward Hebron and Fairbury. US 136 heads west toward Ruskin and Red Cloud. 1st Street heads south through Deshler.)

From its southern terminus N-5 heads north for about 4.5 miles (7.2 km) before crossing over the Little Blue River. Nearly 2 miles (3.2 km) farther north, N-5 crosses over the South Fork Big Sandy Creek. Continuing north for just over 4 miles (6.4 km), N-5 crosses over two sets of Union Pacific Railroad tracks at a level crossing and then promptly crosses over Big Sandy Creek.

About one-half-mile (0.80 km) north of Big Sandy Creek, N-5 reaches its northern terminus at an intersection with N-4 and Road 5400, about 3.2-mile (5.1 km) west of Carleton and 5 miles (8.0 km) east of Davenport. (From the intersection N-4 heads east toward Carleton and Belvidere and west [along with the three historic trails] toward Daveport. Road 5400 heads north toward Shickley.)

== History ==
N-5 was originally designated in 1925 from the Kansas state line south of Falls City north through Omaha to the Iowa state line at South Sioux City and the Missouri River, replacing Nebraska Highway 10, Nebraska Highway 11, Nebraska Highway 12, and a portion of Nebraska Highway 13. Around 1933 the original N-5 became part of US Route 73, U.S. Route 75, U.S. Route 77, and Nebraska Highway 9, and the N-5 designation was transferred to its current route in 1940.

== Major intersections ==
The entire route is in Thayer County.

Location	mi	km	Destinations	Notes
	0.00	0.00	1st Street south – Deshler	Continuation south from southern terminus
	0.00	0.00	US 136 east (Oregon National Historic Trail / California National Historic Trail / Pony Express National Historic Trail) – S-85E, Hebron, Fairbury US 136 west – Ruskin, Red Cloud	Southern terminus
	4.48	7.21	Bridge over the Little Blue River	
	11.04	17.77	N-4 east – Carleton, Belvidere N-4 west (Oregon National Historic Trail / California National Historic Trail / Pony Express National Historic Trail) – Davenport	Northern terminus
	11.04	17.77	Road 5400 north – Shickley	Continuation north from northern terminus
1.000 mi = 1.609 km; 1.000 km = 0.621 mi

== See also ==
- List of state highways in Nebraska
