= NE5 =

NE5, or NE-5, or similar may refer to:

- Clarke Quay MRT station, Singapore
- National Expressway 5 (India)
- Nebraska's 5th congressional district
- Nebraska Highway 5
- NE5, a postcode district in Newcastle upon Tyne, England; see NE postcode area
