= NE4 =

NE4, or NE-4, or similar, may refer to:

- National Expressway 4 (India)
- Chinatown MRT station, Singapore
- Nebraska's 4th congressional district
- Nebraska Highway 4
- New England Interstate Route 4, now U.S. Route 7
- NE4, a postcode district in Newcastle upon Tyne, England; see NE postcode area
