= Nebraska Highway 99 =

State highway in Nebraska, U.S.

State Highway 99

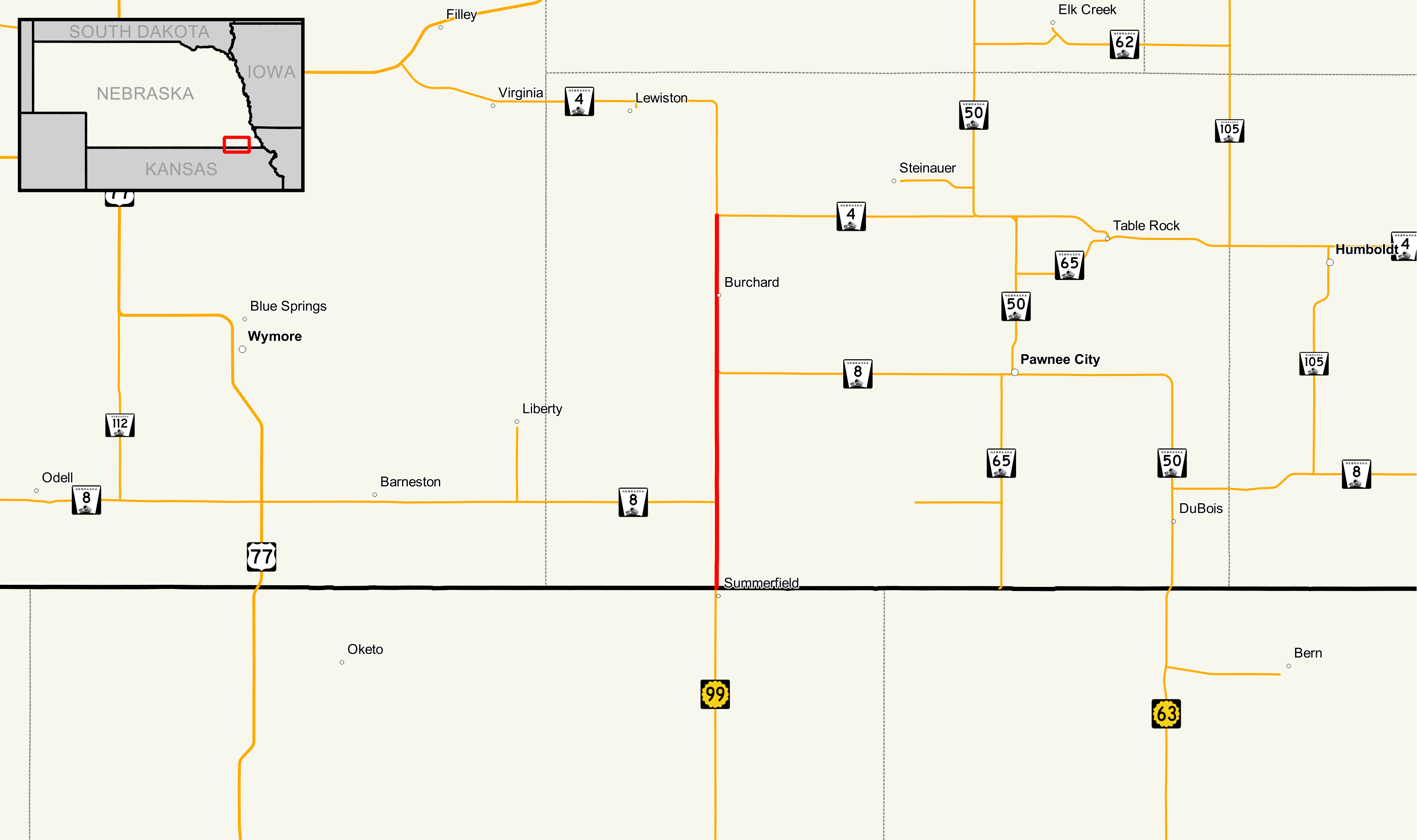
- Nebraska Highway 99 highlighted in red

Route information
- Maintained by NDOT
- Length: 13.05 mi (21.00 km)

Major junctions
- South end: K-99 at the Kansas state line in Summerfield, KS
- North end: N-4 near Burchard

Location
- Country: United States
- State: Nebraska
- Counties: Pawnee

Highway system
- Nebraska State Highway System; Interstate; US; State; Link; Spur; State Spurs; Recreation
← N-98	→ N-103

Nebraska Highway 99 is a highway in southeastern Nebraska. It has a southern terminus at the Kansas border south of Burchard and just north of Summerfield, Kansas. Its northern terminus is north of Burchard at an intersection with Nebraska Highway 4. It lies entirely in Pawnee County. It is a part of a three-state "Highway 99" which includes K-99 in Kansas and Oklahoma State Highway 99.

== Route description ==
Nebraska Highway 99 begins just north of Summerfield, Kansas. The southern terminus of NE 99 is also the northern terminus of K-99. A couple miles north of the border, it is paired with Nebraska Highway 8 for several miles through farmland. After the two highways separate, NE 99 continues north through Burchard. After 3 miles (4.8 km), NE 99 meets Nebraska Highway 4 and ends.

== Major intersections ==
The entire route is in Pawnee County.

Location	mi	km	Destinations	Notes
	0.00	0.00	K-99 south (4th Street)	Continuation into Kansas
	3.01	4.84	N-8 west	South end of NE 8 overlap
	7.64	12.30	N-8 east	North end of NE 8 overlap
	13.05	21.00	N-4	
1.000 mi = 1.609 km; 1.000 km = 0.621 mi: Concurrency terminus
