= Nebraska Highway 103 =

State highway in Nebraska, U.S.

State Highway 103

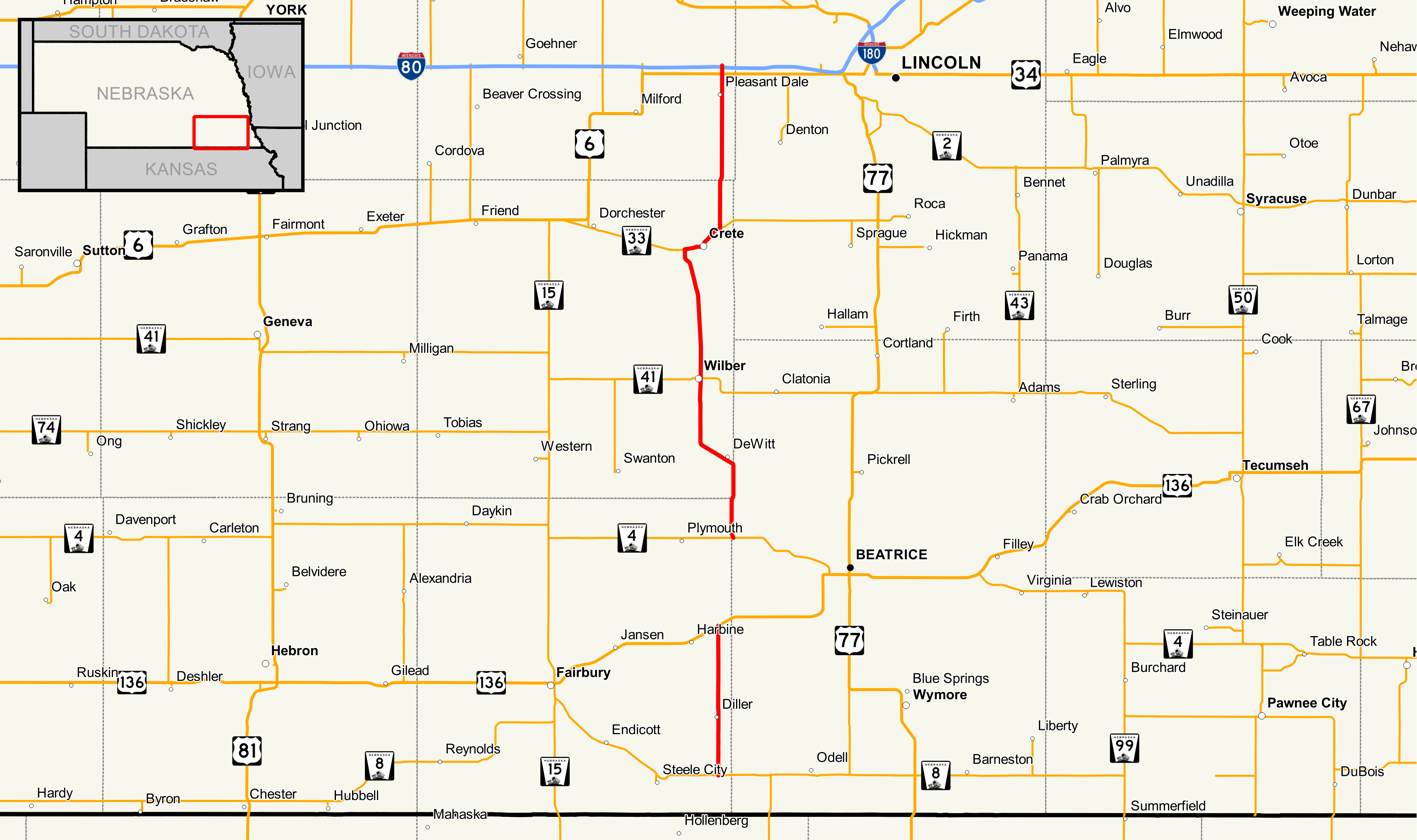
- Nebraska Highway 103 highlighted in red

Route information
- Maintained by NDOT
- Length: 50.59 mi (81.42 km)
- Existed: 1936–present

Southern segment
- Length: 11.39 mi (18.33 km)
- South end: N-8 south of Diller
- North end: US 136 north of Diller

Northern segment
- Length: 39.20 mi (63.09 km)
- South end: N-4 east of Plymouth
- Major intersections: N-41 in Wilber; N-33 in Crete; US 6 north of Pleasant Dale
- North end: I-80 north of Pleasant Dale

Location
- Country: United States
- State: Nebraska
- Counties: Southern segment: Jefferson; Northern segment: Gage, Saline, Seward

Highway system
- Nebraska State Highway System; Interstate; US; State; Link; Spur; State Spurs; Recreation
← N-99	→ N-105

Nebraska Highway 103 is a highway in southeastern Nebraska. It is a discontinuous highway with two segments. The southern segment begins at Nebraska Highway 8 south of Diller and ends at U.S. Highway 136 north of Diller. The northern segment begins at Nebraska Highway 4 east of Plymouth and ends at Interstate 80 north of Pleasant Dale.

== Route description ==
=== Northern segment ===
The northern segment of Nebraska Highway 103 begins at N-4, east of Plymouth. It heads in a northerly direction through farmland, turning briefly to the northwest as it passes through De Witt. After leaving De Witt, N-103 continues heading northward. In Wilber, it intersects with N-41. The highway continues heading north and slightly to the northwest until it meets N-33 in Crete. It runs concurrently with N-33 for about 3.5 miles (5.6 km), passing through Crete. Just to the northeast of Crete, N-103 splits off and continues northward. After passing through Pleasant Dale, it intersects with US 6. Less than a mile later, N-103 intersects with I-80 where it then terminates.

=== Southern segment ===
The southern branch of Nebraska Highway 103 begins at an intersection with N-8 south of Diller. It heads directly northward through farmland, passing through Diller along the way. At US 136 north of Diller, this segment of N-103 terminates and resumes about 8 miles (13 km) to the north.

== History ==
=== Northern segment ===

The northern segment was first numbered N-82 as early as 1937. The renumbering of N-82 to N-103 occurred somewhere between 1962 and 1981. Also during this timeframe, N-103 was rerouted to the southwest of Crete and extended north through Pleasant Dale, terminating at a newly constructed interchange with I-80. Originally gravel before and around 1981, the section north of Crete has since been paved.

=== Southern segment ===
The southern segment of N-103 largely follows today's alignment. However, according to the 1937 state highway map, its southern terminus was Diller. Between 1937 and 1940, N-103 was extended further south and terminated at Nebraska Highway 3 South (the current terminus), or present day N-4.

== Major intersections ==
County	Location	mi	km	Destinations	Notes
Jefferson		0.00	0.00	N-8 (705th Road)	Southern terminus of southern segment
Jefferson	Harbine	11.39	18.33	US 136	Northern terminus of southern segment
Jefferson	7.85-mile (12.63 km) gap in route				
Jefferson		19.24	30.96	N-4	Southern terminus of northern segment
Gage	No major junctions				
Saline	Wilber	32.73	52.67	N-41 (3rd Street)	
Saline	Crete	42.70	68.72	N-33 west	South end of N-33 overlap
Saline	Crete	46.14	74.26	N-33 east	North end of NE 33 overlap
Seward	Pleasant Dale	57.79	93.00	US 6 (O Street Road)	
Seward	Pleasant Dale	58.23– 58.44	93.71– 94.05	I-80	I-80 exit 388
1.000 mi = 1.609 km; 1.000 km = 0.621 mi: Concurrency terminus
