= Alexandria, Nebraska =

Village in Thayer County, Nebraska, United States

- Village
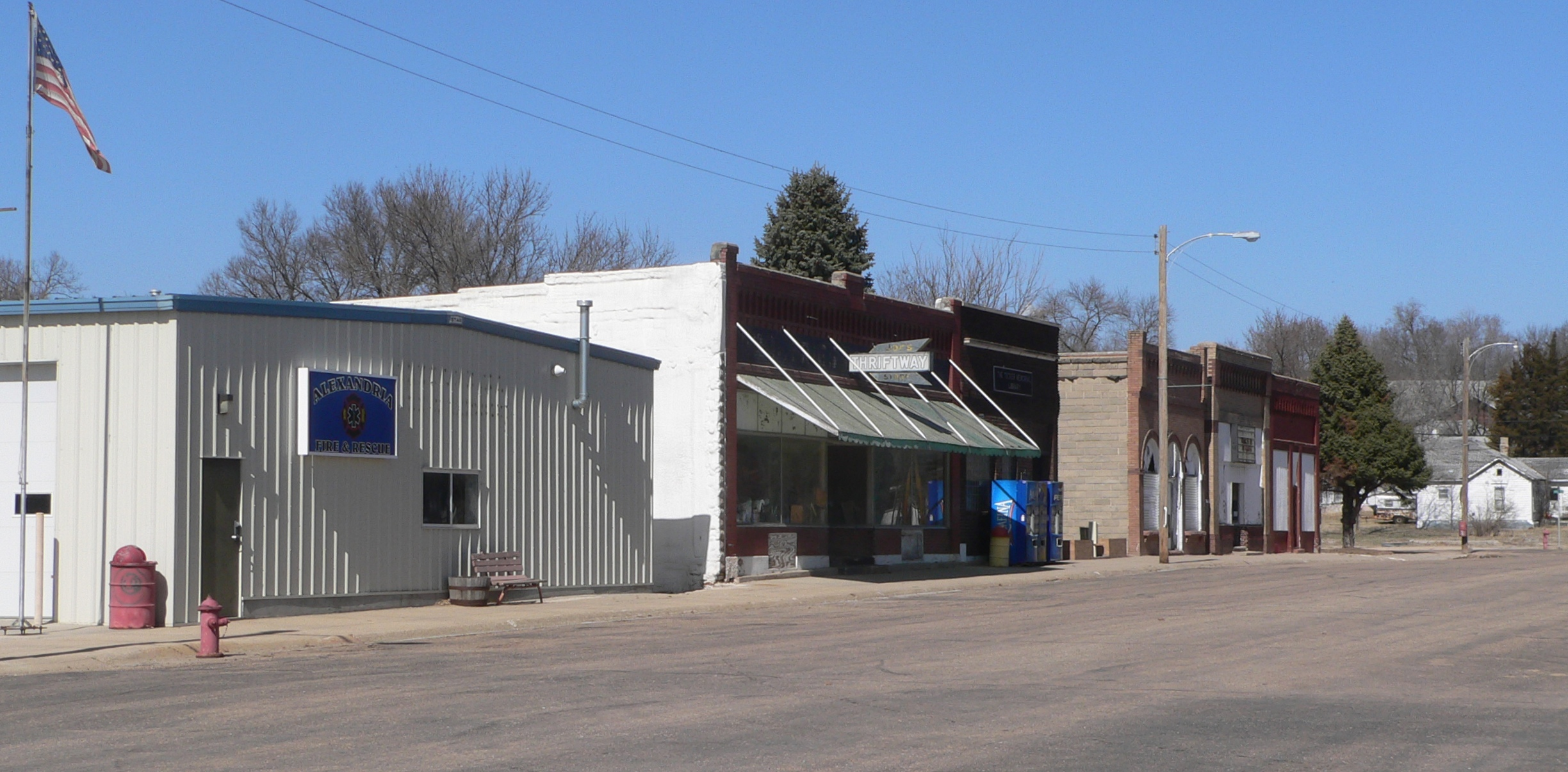
- Downtown Alexandria: Harbine Street, March 2012

- Location of Alexandria, Nebraska
- Coordinates: 40°14′51″N 97°23′16″W
- Country: United States
- State: Nebraska
- County: Thayer

Area
  - Total: 0.41 sq mi (1.05 km^{2})
  - Land: 0.41 sq mi (1.05 km^{2})
  - Water: 0 sq mi (0.00 km^{2})
- Elevation: 1,431 ft (436 m)

Population (2020)
  - Total: 146
  - Estimate (2021): 142
  - Density: 365.9/sq mi (141.28/km^{2})
- Time zone: UTC-6 (Central (CST))
  - Summer (DST): UTC-5 (CDT)
- ZIP code: 68303
- Area code: 402
- FIPS code: 31-00730
- GNIS feature ID: 2397928
- Website: http://www.alexandriane.com/

Alexandria is a village in Thayer County, Nebraska, United States. The population was 146 at the 2020 census.

== History ==
In the 1840s and 1850s, the Oregon Trail passed through present-day Thayer County, following the Little Blue River through southeastern Nebraska before crossing into the valley of the Platte River. Settlers arrived along the trail in the late 1850s. The first permanent white residents of the county arrived in 1858, settling about two and a half miles (about four kilometers) south of present-day Alexandria, on the divide between the Little Blue and Big Sandy Creek. In 1859, Isaac Alexander arrived from Kansas with a portable gristmill; he settled on Big Sandy Creek, where he built a log cabin and stockade.

In 1872, the St. Joseph and Denver Railroad (later the St. Joseph and Grand Island) was extended into Thayer County. The railroad passed through the Alexander family's property. At the railroad's behest, the Nebraska Land and Town Company platted towns along its route, naming them in alphabetical order; the easternmost of these was Alexandria, followed by Belvidere, Carleton, and Davenport. The town was named after Isaac Alexander's son, S. J. Alexander, who had been involved in negotiating the railroad's route through Thayer County, and who later served as Nebraska's Secretary of State.

Alexandria grew rapidly; its early growth was augmented by residents and businesses moving from the town of Meridian, established as the county seat of Jones County (now Jefferson County) but bypassed by the railroad and eventually abandoned. The town supported a flour mill on Big Sandy Creek; a newspaper, the Alexandrian, was established in 1879; and by 1882, there were four churches.

The town was beset by three severe storms in the decade following its establishment. In 1875, a tornado levelled a school building that had just been completed at a cost of $6,000. A second storm, in 1877, did only minor damage; a third, in 1881, produced several fatalities and widespread property damage.

== Geography ==
According to the United States Census Bureau, the village has a total area of 0.40 square miles (1.04 km^{2}), all land.

== Demographics ==
Historical population
| Census | Pop. | Note | %± |
|---|---|---|---|
| 1880 | 387 | | — |
| 1900 | 332 | | — |
| 1910 | 447 | | 34.6% |
| 1920 | 432 | | −3.4% |
| 1930 | 421 | | −2.5% |
| 1940 | 369 | | −12.4% |
| 1950 | 317 | | −14.1% |
| 1960 | 257 | | −18.9% |
| 1970 | 225 | | −12.5% |
| 1980 | 255 | | 13.3% |
| 1990 | 224 | | −12.2% |
| 2000 | 216 | | −3.6% |
| 2010 | 177 | | −18.1% |
| 2020 | 148 | | −16.4% |
| 2021 (est.) | 142 | ▼ | −4.1% |
U.S. Decennial Census

=== 2010 census ===
As of the census of 2010, there were 177 people, 82 households, and 44 families residing in the village. The population density was 442.5 inhabitants per square mile (170.9/km^{2}). There were 105 housing units at an average density of 262.5 per square mile (101.4/km^{2}). The racial makeup of the village was 93.8% White, 0.6% Native American, 2.3% from other races, and 3.4% from two or more races. Hispanic or Latino of any race were 2.3% of the population.

There were 82 households, of which 25.6% had children under the age of 18 living with them, 42.7% were married couples living together, 7.3% had a female householder with no husband present, 3.7% had a male householder with no wife present, and 46.3% were non-families. 40.2% of all households were made up of individuals, and 20.8% had someone living alone who was 65 years of age or older. The average household size was 2.16 and the average family size was 2.91.

The median age in the village was 43.3 years. 25.4% of residents were under the age of 18; 5.1% were between the ages of 18 and 24; 21.5% were from 25 to 44; 25.9% were from 45 to 64; and 22% were 65 years of age or older. The gender makeup of the village was 44.1% male and 55.9% female.

=== 2000 census ===
As of the census of 2000, there were 216 people, 99 households, and 53 families residing in the village. The population density was 539.9 inhabitants per square mile (208.5/km^{2}). There were 110 housing units at an average density of 275.0 per square mile (106.2/km^{2}). The racial makeup of the village was 99.54% White, and 0.46% from two or more races. Hispanic or Latino of any race were 1.85% of the population.

There were 99 households, out of which 24.2% had children under the age of 18 living with them, 43.4% were married couples living together, 7.1% had a female householder with no husband present, and 45.5% were non-families. 40.4% of all households were made up of individuals, and 26.3% had someone living alone who was 65 years of age or older. The average household size was 2.18 and the average family size was 2.94.

In the village, the population was spread out, with 27.3% under the age of 18, 7.4% from 18 to 24, 17.6% from 25 to 44, 24.1% from 45 to 64, and 23.6% who were 65 years of age or older. The median age was 42 years. For every 100 females, there were 84.6 males. For every 100 females age 18 and over, there were 86.9 males.

As of 2000 the median income for a household in the village was $22,083, and the median income for a family was $29,583. Males had a median income of $21,750 versus $17,750 for females. The per capita income for the village was $11,988. About 20.4% of families and 25.0% of the population were below the poverty line, including 38.6% of those under the age of 18 and 31.0% of those 65 or over.

== Education ==
Local children attend Meridian School in Daykin.

== Sports ==
For many years, Alexandria fielded a men's softball team that played other town teams from around the state, and then venturing to the State Tournament in Hastings. Alexandria has claimed two trophies from the Tournament, a third place in Class D-2 in 2002 and a state championship in class D in 1996. The local leagues have since fizzled out, and many teams around the area have dissolved, but Alexandria has still taken a team to the State Tournament to compete until 2012.

== Notable person ==
- Bryant B. Brooks (1861-1944) - served as Governor of Wyoming from 1905 to 1911.

== See also ==
- List of municipalities in Nebraska
