= Blue Hill, Nebraska =

City in Webster County, Nebraska, United States

- City
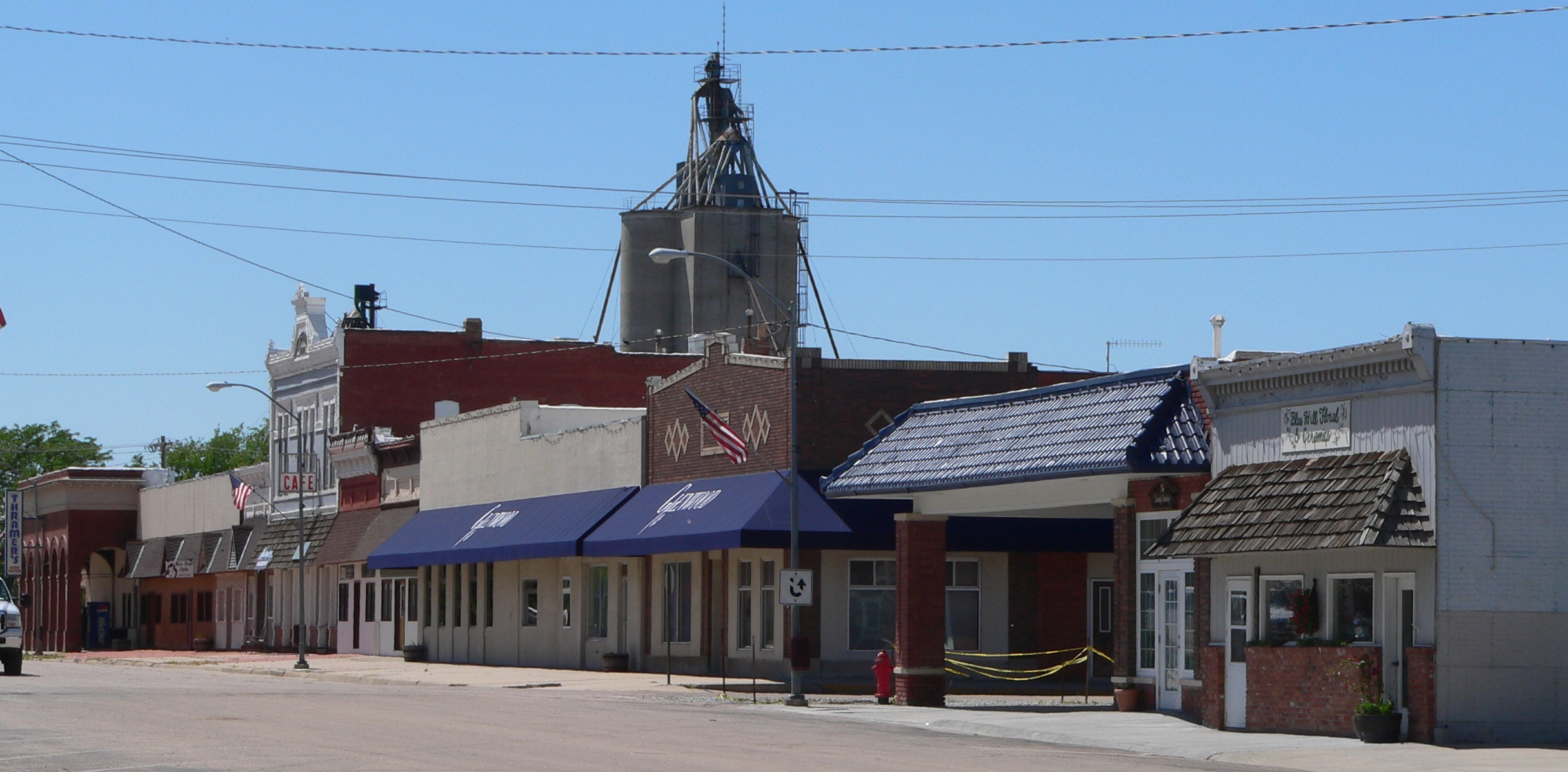
- Downtown Blue Hill: north side of West Gage Street, May 2010

- Location of Blue Hill, Nebraska
- Coordinates: 40°19′59″N 98°26′54″W
- Country: United States
- State: Nebraska
- County: Webster

Area
  - Total: 0.73 sq mi (1.90 km^{2})
  - Land: 0.73 sq mi (1.90 km^{2})
  - Water: 0 sq mi (0.00 km^{2})
- Elevation: 1,972 ft (601 m)

Population (2020)
  - Total: 805
  - Density: 1,097.7/sq mi (423.83/km^{2})
- Time zone: UTC-6 (Central (CST))
  - Summer (DST): UTC-5 (CDT)
- ZIP code: 68930
- Area code: 402
- FIPS code: 31-05560
- GNIS feature ID: 2394202
- Website: http://bluehillne.com/

Blue Hill is a town in Webster County, Nebraska, United States. As of the 2020 census, Blue Hill had a population of 805. Mayor- Kirsten Schofield

== History ==
Blue Hill was originally called Belmont, and under the latter name was platted in 1878 when the Burlington and Missouri River Railroad was extended to that point. When it was discovered that another Belmont in the state existed, the name was changed to Blue Hill. The present name alludes to the nearby Blue River.

The Blue Hill Country Club was built in late 50's early 60's by Axel E. Ohlin and son Dale R. Ohlin from nearby Hastings Nebraska.

== Geography ==
According to the United States Census Bureau, the city has a total area of 0.73 square miles (1.89 km^{2}), all land. Blue Hill is situated 22.5 miles north of the Nebraska-Kansas state line and is 150 miles west of the Missouri River.

=== Climate ===
Climate data for Blue Hill, Nebraska (coordinates:40.3058°N 98.5047°W, 1991-2020)
Month	Jan	Feb	Mar	Apr	May	Jun	Jul	Aug	Sep	Oct	Nov	Dec	Year
Average precipitation inches (mm)	0.65 (17)	0.80 (20)	1.47 (37)	2.60 (66)	4.57 (116)	3.61 (92)	3.92 (100)	3.48 (88)	2.32 (59)	2.05 (52)	1.26 (32)	0.85 (22)	27.58 (701)
Average snowfall inches (cm)	5.7 (14)	7.8 (20)	3.2 (8.1)	1.4 (3.6)	0.0 (0.0)	0.0 (0.0)	0.0 (0.0)	0.0 (0.0)	0.0 (0.0)	1.2 (3.0)	1.6 (4.1)	4.4 (11)	25.3 (63.8)
Average precipitation days (≥ 0.01 in)	3.4	3.7	5.2	7.1	9.2	7.9	6.7	6.4	4.9	4.9	3.7	3.3	66.4
Average snowy days (≥ 0.01 in)	2.7	2.9	1.4	0.8	0	0	0	0	0	0.3	1.3	2.3	11.7
Source: NOAA

== Government ==
Blue Hill's local government consists of one mayor and five board members who hold meetings on the second Tuesday of every month. As of January 2011, the mayor is Keri Schunk.

== Demographics ==
Historical population
Census	Pop.	Note	%±
1880	138		—
1890	796		476.8%
1900	823		3.4%
1910	761		−7.5%
1920	726		−4.6%
1930	669		−7.9%
1940	565		−15.5%
1950	574		1.6%
1960	723		26.0%
1970	784		8.4%
1980	883		12.6%
1990	810		−8.3%
2000	867		7.0%
2010	936		8.0%
2020	805		−14.0%
U.S. Decennial Census

=== 2010 census ===
As of the census of 2010, there were 936 people, 363 households, and 228 families residing in the city. The population density was 1,282.2 inhabitants per square mile (495.1/km^{2}). There were 392 housing units at an average density of 537.0 per square mile (207.3/km^{2}). The racial makeup of the city was 97.4% White, 0.6% African American, 0.1% Native American, 0.2% Asian, 0.1% Pacific Islander, 0.1% from other races, and 1.4% from two or more races. Hispanic or Latino of any race were 1.8% of the population.

There were 363 households, of which 32.8% had children under the age of 18 living with them, 52.1% were married couples living together, 8.0% had a female householder with no husband present, 2.8% had a male householder with no wife present, and 37.2% were non-families. 34.4% of all households were made up of individuals, and 22% had someone living alone who was 65 years of age or older. The average household size was 2.37 and the average family size was 3.04.

The median age in the city was 44.1 years. 25.4% of residents were under the age of 18; 6.5% were between the ages of 18 and 24; 20% were from 25 to 44; 26.2% were from 45 to 64; and 22% were 65 years of age or older. The gender makeup of the city was 45.2% male and 54.8% female.

=== 2000 census ===
As of the census of 2000, there were 867 people, 350 households, and 231 families residing in the city. The population density was 1,178.3 inhabitants per square mile (454.9/km^{2}). There were 392 housing units at an average density of 532.8 per square mile (205.7/km^{2}). The racial makeup of the city was 97.81% White, 0.35% African American, 0.46% Native American, 0.69% Asian, 0.46% from other races, and 0.23% from two or more races. Hispanic or Latino of any race were 0.81% of the population.

There were 350 households, out of which 26.0% had children under the age of 18 living with them, 58.9% were married couples living together, 4.6% had a female householder with no husband present, and 34.0% were non-families. 32.6% of all households were made up of individuals, and 20.6% had someone living alone who was 65 years of age or older. The average household size was 2.26 and the average family size was 2.85.

In the city, the population was spread out, with 20.8% under the age of 18, 5.2% from 18 to 24, 21.3% from 25 to 44, 22.6% from 45 to 64, and 30.1% who were 65 years of age or older. The median age was 47 years. For every 100 females there were 82.9 males. For every 100 females age 18 and over, there were 78.9 males.

As of 2000 the median income for a household in the city was $30,938, and the median income for a family was $43,500. Males had a median income of $29,167 versus $19,904 for females. The per capita income for the city was $15,733. About 8.1% of families and 10.4% of the population were below the poverty line, including 16.4% of those under age 18 and 11.4% of those age 65 or over.

== See also ==
- List of municipalities in Nebraska
