= Nebraska Highway 65 =

State highway in Nebraska, U.S.

State Highway 65

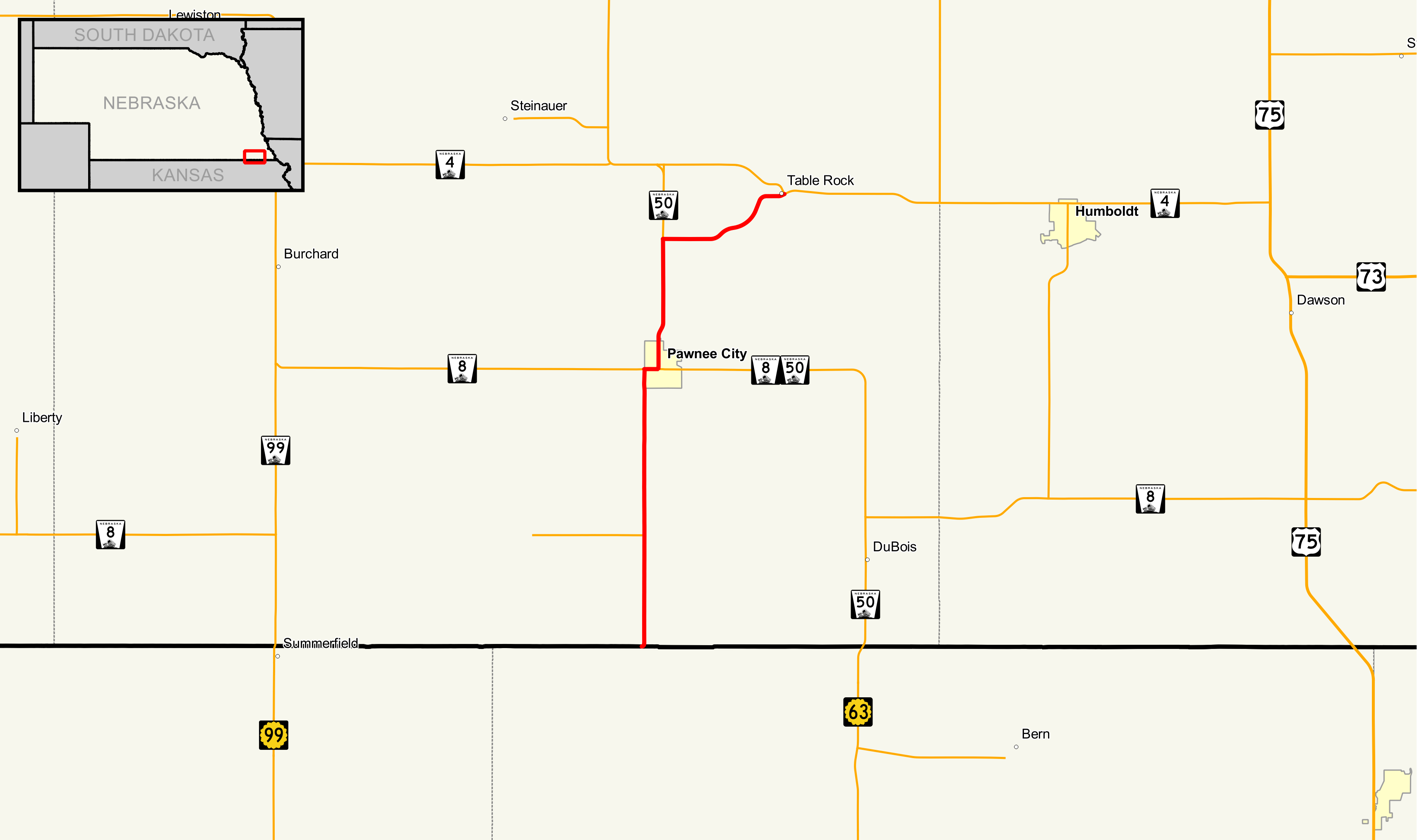
- Nebraska Highway 65 highlighted in red

Route information
- Maintained by NDOT
- Length: 15.23 mi (24.51 km)
- Existed: 1933–present

Major junctions
- South end: Bailey-Pawnee Road at Kansas border south of Pawnee City
- North end: N-4 in Table Rock

Location
- Country: United States
- State: Nebraska
- Counties: Pawnee

Highway system
- Nebraska State Highway System; Interstate; US; State; Link; Spur; State Spurs; Recreation
← N-64	→ N-66

Nebraska Highway 65 is a highway in southeastern Nebraska. It is a north–south highway with a length of 15.25 miles (24.54 km). The southern terminus of Nebraska Highway 65 is at the Kansas border south of Pawnee City. The northern terminus is in Table Rock at an intersection with Nebraska Highway 4.

== Route description ==
Nebraska Highway 65 begins at the Kansas border. The road continues into Kansas as Bailey-Pawnee Road. Highway 65 goes north from the border on a gravel road. The highway becomes paved as it approaches Pawnee City. It then meets Nebraska Highway 8 at the western city limits of Pawnee City and they run concurrently going east until an intersection with Nebraska Highway 50. Highway 65 then turns north with Highway 50 and they run concurrently for 3 miles (4.8 km). They then separate and Highway 65 goes east, then northeast and ends in Table Rock at an intersection with Nebraska Highway 4.

== Major intersections ==
The entire route is in Pawnee County.

Location	mi	km	Destinations	Notes
	0.00	0.00	Bailey-Pawnee Road south	Kansas state line; route begins on a gravel road
	3.04	4.89	S-67C west	
	7.04	11.33	Pavement begins	
Pawnee City	7.53	12.12	N-8 west – Beatrice	South end of NE 8 overlap
Pawnee City	7.90	12.71	N-8 east / N-50 south (7th Street east)	North end of NE 8 overlap; south end of NE 50 overlap
	11.42	18.38	N-50 north – Tecumseh	North end of NE 50 overlap
Table Rock	15.23	24.51	N-4	Northern terminus
1.000 mi = 1.609 km; 1.000 km = 0.621 mi: Concurrency terminus
