= Thayer County, Nebraska =

County in Nebraska, United States

Coordinates: 40.18°N 97.59°W

Thayer County
- County
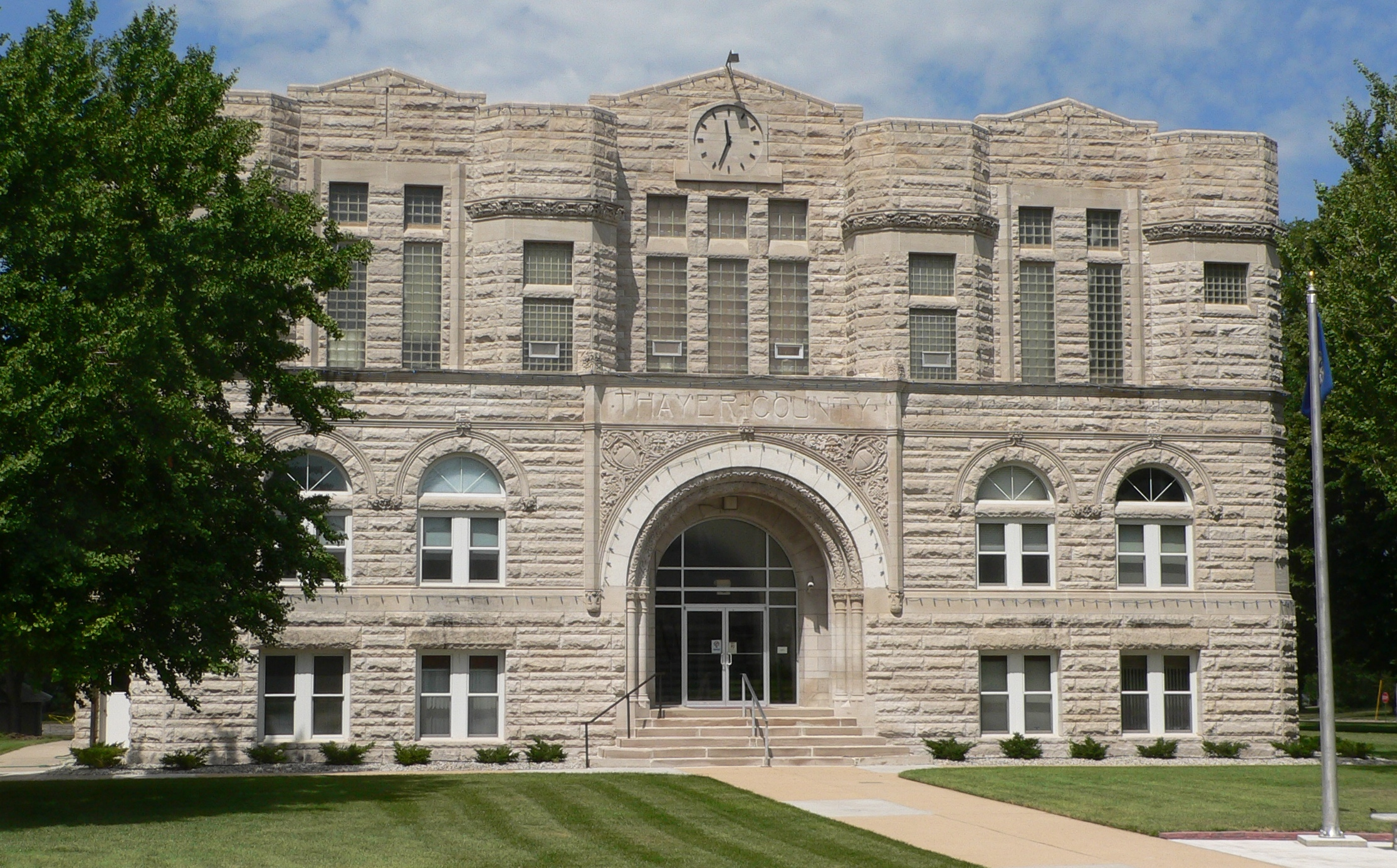
- Thayer County Courthouse in Hebron
- Interactive map of Thayer County
- Location within the U.S. state of Nebraska
- Country: United States
- State: Nebraska
- Established: May 9, 1871
- Named for: John Milton Thayer
- County seat: Hebron
- Largest city: Hebron

Area
  - Total: 575 sq mi (1,490 km^{2})
  - Land: 574 sq mi (1,490 km^{2})
  - Water: 1.2 sq mi (3.1 km^{2}) 0.2%
- Highest elevation: 1,545 ft (471 m)
- Lowest elevation: 1,142 ft (348 m)

Population
  - Estimate (2021): 4,913
  - Density: 8.8/sq mi (3.4/km^{2})
- Time zone: UTC−6 (Central)
  - Summer (DST): UTC−5 (CDT)
- Area code: 402/531
- FIPS code: 31169
- GNIS feature ID: 835906
- Website: thayercountyne.gov

Thayer County is a county in the U.S. state of Nebraska. As of the 2020 United States census, the population was 5,034. Its county seat is Hebron. The county was created in 1856 and originally named Jefferson County. It was organized in 1870-1871 and renamed for General and Governor John Milton Thayer.

In the Nebraska license plate system, Thayer County is represented by the prefix 32 (it had the thirty-second-largest number of vehicles registered in the state when the license plate system was established in 1922).

== Geography ==
Thayer County lies on the south line of Nebraska. Its south boundary line abuts the north boundary line of the state of Kansas. Its terrain consists of rolling hills, sloped toward the east. A local drainage, Big Sandy Creek, flows southeast and east through the northern part of the county, and another drainage, Rose Creek, flows northeastward through the SE corner of the county (they converge east of Thayer County's east boundary line). The planar portions of the terrain are partially used for agriculture.

Thayer County has an area of 575 square miles (1,490 km^{2}), of which 574 square miles (1,490 km^{2}) is land and 1.2 square miles (3.1 km^{2}) (0.2%) is water.

=== Major highways ===
- U.S. Highway 81
- U.S. Highway 136
- Nebraska Highway 4
- Nebraska Highway 5
- Nebraska Highway 8
- Nebraska Highway 53

=== Adjacent counties ===
- Saline County – northeast
- Jefferson County – east
- Washington County, Kansas – southeast
- Republic County, Kansas – south
- Nuckolls County – west
- Fillmore County – north

=== Protected areas ===
- Prairie Marsh State Wildlife Management Area
- Prairie Marsh West State Wildlife Management Area

== Demographics ==
Historical population
Census	Pop.	Note	%±
1880	6,113		—
1890	12,738		108.4%
1900	14,325		12.5%
1910	14,775		3.1%
1920	13,976		−5.4%
1930	13,684		−2.1%
1940	12,262		−10.4%
1950	10,563		−13.9%
1960	9,118		−13.7%
1970	7,779		−14.7%
1980	7,582		−2.5%
1990	6,635		−12.5%
2000	6,055		−8.7%
2010	5,228		−13.7%
2020	5,034		−3.7%
2023 (est.)	4,829		−4.1%
US Decennial Census; 1790-1960 1900-1990; 1990-2000 2010-2013

=== 2020 census ===
As of the 2020 census, the county had a population of 5,034. The median age was 46.8 years. 22.9% of residents were under the age of 18 and 25.9% of residents were 65 years of age or older. For every 100 females there were 98.3 males, and for every 100 females age 18 and over there were 98.7 males age 18 and over.

The racial makeup of the county was 95.7% White, 0.2% Black or African American, 0.3% American Indian and Alaska Native, 0.2% Asian, 0.1% Native Hawaiian and Pacific Islander, 0.9% from some other race, and 2.6% from two or more races. Hispanic or Latino residents of any race comprised 2.7% of the population.

0.0% of residents lived in urban areas, while 100.0% lived in rural areas.

There were 2,143 households in the county, of which 26.1% had children under the age of 18 living with them and 20.4% had a female householder with no spouse or partner present. About 31.1% of all households were made up of individuals and 16.9% had someone living alone who was 65 years of age or older.

There were 2,498 housing units, of which 14.2% were vacant. Among occupied housing units, 79.5% were owner-occupied and 20.5% were renter-occupied. The homeowner vacancy rate was 1.8% and the rental vacancy rate was 13.2%.

=== 2000 census ===
As of the 2000 United States census, there were 6,055 people, 2,541 households, and 1,689 families in the county. The population density was 10 people per square mile (3.9 people/km^{2}). There were 2,828 housing units at an average density of 5 units per square mile (1.9/km^{2}).

The racial makeup of the county was 98.70% White, 0.02% Black or African American, 0.28% Native American, 0.12% Asian, 0.33% from other races, and 0.56% from two or more races. 1.01% of the population were Hispanic or Latino of any race.

There were 2,541 households, out of which 27.70% had children under the age of 18 living with them, 58.80% were married couples living together, 5.00% had a female householder with no husband present, and 33.50% were non-families. 31.50% of all households were made up of individuals, and 18.20% had someone living alone who was 65 years of age or older. The average household size was 2.31 and the average family size was 2.90.

The county population contained 24.10% under the age of 18, 4.90% from 18 to 24, 22.30% from 25 to 44, 24.20% from 45 to 64, and 24.50% who were 65 years of age or older. The median age was 44 years. For every 100 females there were 95.80 males. For every 100 females age 18 and over, there were 92.80 males.

The median income for a household in the county was $30,740, and the median income for a family was $38,346. Males had a median income of $26,964 versus $18,275 for females. The per capita income for the county was $17,043. About 7.60% of families and 10.70% of the population were below the poverty line, including 14.80% of those under age 18 and 11.00% of those age 65 or over.

== Communities ==
=== Cities ===
- Deshler
- Hebron (county seat)

=== Villages ===
- Alexandria
- Belvidere
- Bruning
- Byron
- Carleton
- Chester
- Davenport
- Gilead
- Hubbell

== Politics ==
Thayer County voters are reliably Republican. In only one national election since 1936 has the county selected the Democratic Party candidate (as of 2024).

United States presidential election results for Thayer County, Nebraska
Year	Republican		Democratic		Third party(ies)	
Year	No.	%	No.	%	No.	%
1900	1,825	54.09%	1,516	44.93%	33	0.98%
1904	1,930	62.48%	812	26.29%	347	11.23%
1908	1,714	49.07%	1,703	48.75%	76	2.18%
1912	703	21.37%	1,490	45.29%	1,097	33.34%
1916	1,772	51.26%	1,581	45.73%	104	3.01%
1920	3,456	73.31%	1,120	23.76%	138	2.93%
1924	2,847	52.73%	1,719	31.84%	833	15.43%
1928	3,552	61.80%	2,173	37.80%	23	0.40%
1932	1,878	32.33%	3,841	66.12%	90	1.55%
1936	2,628	42.91%	3,418	55.80%	79	1.29%
1940	3,893	65.21%	2,077	34.79%	0	0.00%
1944	3,554	68.37%	1,644	31.63%	0	0.00%
1948	2,601	57.39%	1,931	42.61%	0	0.00%
1952	3,992	75.92%	1,266	24.08%	0	0.00%
1956	3,346	69.81%	1,447	30.19%	0	0.00%
1960	3,202	67.38%	1,550	32.62%	0	0.00%
1964	2,132	48.13%	2,298	51.87%	0	0.00%
1968	2,331	65.31%	1,061	29.73%	177	4.96%
1972	2,274	69.93%	978	30.07%	0	0.00%
1976	1,994	59.35%	1,315	39.14%	51	1.52%
1980	2,514	68.88%	926	25.37%	210	5.75%
1984	2,580	72.66%	946	26.64%	25	0.70%
1988	1,981	59.56%	1,322	39.75%	23	0.69%
1992	1,391	40.79%	924	27.10%	1,095	32.11%
1996	1,698	56.81%	933	31.21%	358	11.98%
2000	2,096	69.73%	821	27.31%	89	2.96%
2004	2,075	72.10%	764	26.55%	39	1.36%
2008	1,749	65.78%	860	32.34%	50	1.88%
2012	1,874	70.48%	728	27.38%	57	2.14%
2016	2,051	76.25%	499	18.55%	140	5.20%
2020	2,308	77.22%	624	20.88%	57	1.91%
2024	2,278	79.57%	544	19.00%	41	1.43%

== See also ==
- National Register of Historic Places listings in Thayer County NE
