= Gilead, Nebraska =

Village in Thayer County, Nebraska, United States

- Village
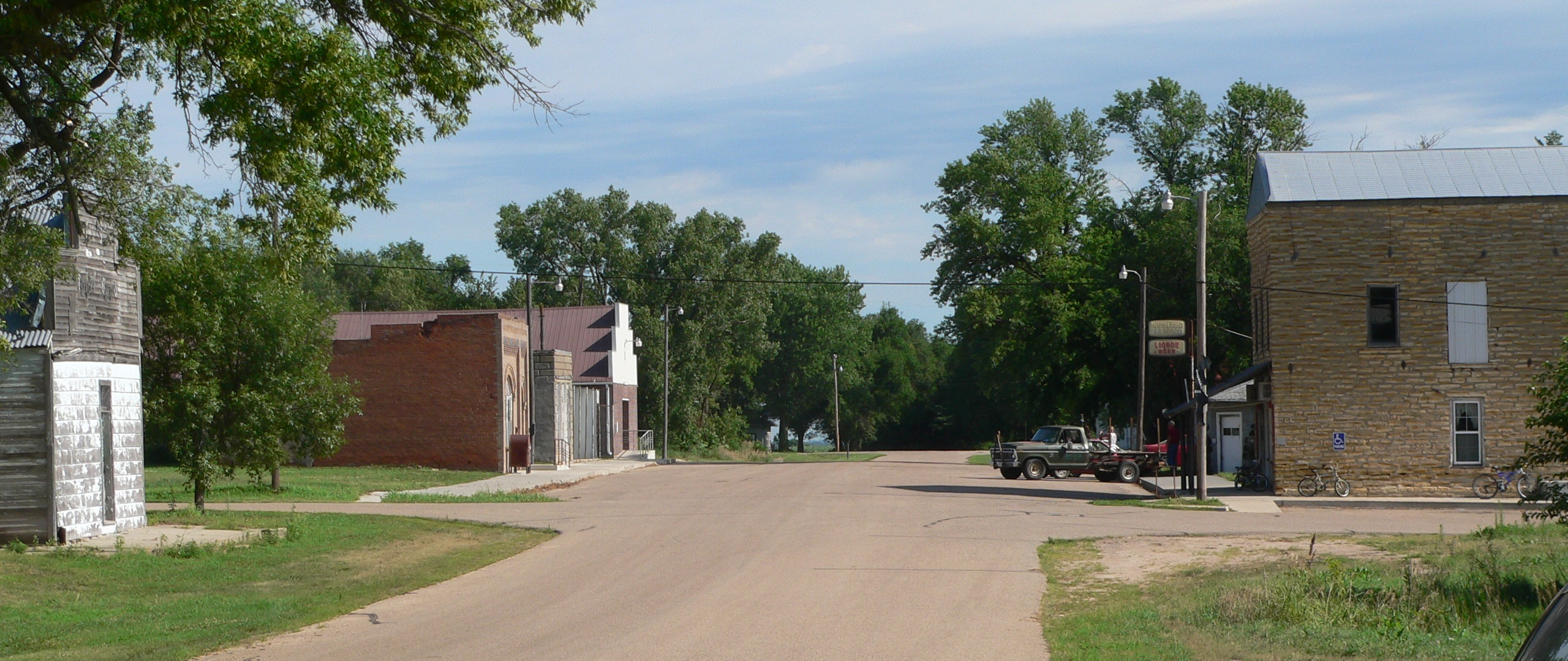
- Downtown Gilead: Main Street, looking north, July 2010

- Location of Gilead, Nebraska
- Coordinates: 40°08′46″N 97°24′54″W
- Country: United States
- State: Nebraska
- County: Thayer

Area
  - Total: 0.069 sq mi (0.18 km^{2})
  - Land: 0.069 sq mi (0.18 km^{2})
  - Water: 0 sq mi (0.00 km^{2})
- Elevation: 1,555 ft (474 m)

Population (2020)
  - Total: 32
  - Estimate (2021): 31
  - Density: 460/sq mi (180/km^{2})
- Time zone: UTC-6 (Central (CST))
  - Summer (DST): UTC-5 (CDT)
- ZIP code: 68362
- Area code: 402
- FIPS code: 31-18720
- GNIS feature ID: 2398963

Gilead is a village in Thayer County, Nebraska, United States. The population was 32 at the 2020 census.

== History ==
Gilead was established in the 1880s when the railroad was extended to that point. It took its name from Gilead Precinct.

== Geography ==
According to the United States Census Bureau, the village has a total area of 0.07 square miles (0.18 km^{2}), all land.

== Demographics ==
Historical population
Census	Pop.	Note	%±
1910	181		—
1920	155		−14.4%
1930	147		−5.2%
1940	148		0.7%
1950	109		−26.4%
1960	79		−27.5%
1970	60		−24.1%
1980	69		15.0%
1990	37		−46.4%
2000	40		8.1%
2010	39		−2.5%
2020	30		−23.1%
2021 (est.)	31	▲	3.3%
U.S. Decennial Census

=== 2010 census ===
As of the census of 2010, there were 39 people, 16 households, and 11 families residing in the village. The population density was 557.1 inhabitants per square mile (215.1/km^{2}). There were 24 housing units at an average density of 342.9 per square mile (132.4/km^{2}). The racial makeup of the village was 100.0% White.

There were 16 households, of which 37.5% had children under the age of 18 living with them, 62.5% were married couples living together, 6.3% had a female householder with no husband present, and 31.3% were non-families. 31.3% of all households were made up of individuals, and 12.6% had someone living alone who was 65 years of age or older. The average household size was 2.44 and the average family size was 3.09.

The median age in the village was 43.5 years. 30.8% of residents were under the age of 18; 2.5% were between the ages of 18 and 24; 20.5% were from 25 to 44; 30.8% were from 45 to 64; and 15.4% were 65 years of age or older. The gender makeup of the village was 51.3% male and 48.7% female.

=== 2000 census ===
As of the census of 2000, there were 40 people, 19 households, and 12 families residing in the village. The population density was 587.5 inhabitants per square mile (226.8/km^{2}). There were 22 housing units at an average density of 323.1 per square mile (124.7/km^{2}). The racial makeup of the village was 100.00% White.

There were 19 households, out of which 21.1% had children under the age of 18 living with them, 63.2% were married couples living together, and 36.8% were non-families. 36.8% of all households were made up of individuals, and 21.1% had someone living alone who was 65 years of age or older. The average household size was 2.11 and the average family size was 2.75.

In the village, the population was spread out, with 22.5% under the age of 18, 5.0% from 18 to 24, 22.5% from 25 to 44, 30.0% from 45 to 64, and 20.0% who were 65 years of age or older. The median age was 45 years. For every 100 females, there were 110.5 males. For every 100 females age 18 and over, there were 93.8 males.

As of 2000 the median income for a household in the village was $21,250, and the median income for a family was $30,833. Males had a median income of $19,583 versus $13,438 for females. The per capita income for the village was $15,321. There were no families and 11.9% of the population living below the poverty line, including no under eighteens and 22.2% of those over 64.

== See also ==
- List of municipalities in Nebraska
