= Lewiston, Nebraska =

- Village
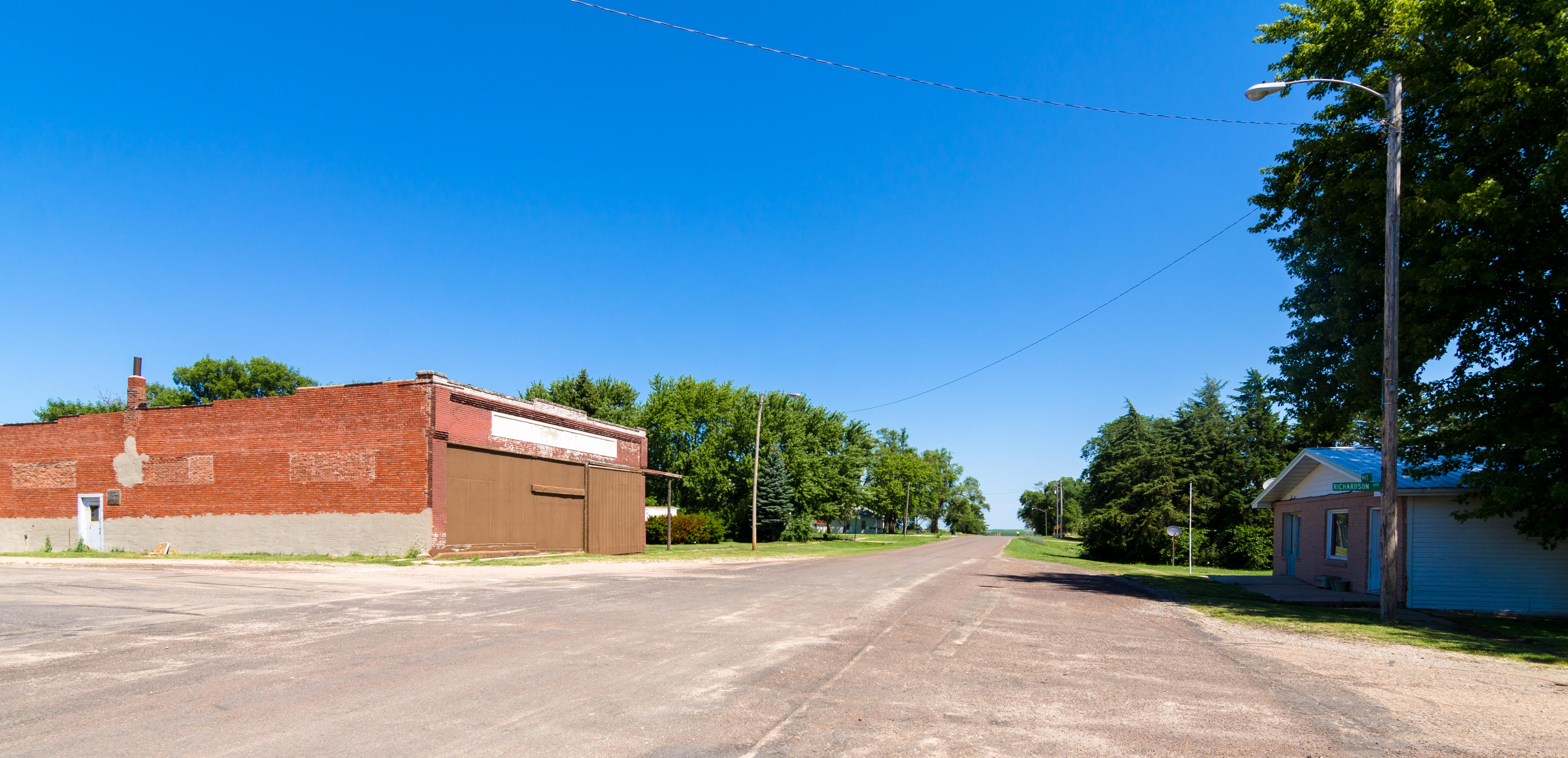

- Location of Lewiston, Nebraska
- Coordinates: 40°14′34″N 96°24′27″W
- Country: United States
- State: Nebraska
- County: Pawnee

Area
  - Total: 0.10 sq mi (0.27 km^{2})
  - Land: 0.10 sq mi (0.27 km^{2})
  - Water: 0 sq mi (0.00 km^{2})
- Elevation: 1,450 ft (440 m)

Population (2020)
  - Total: 54
  - Estimate (2021): 54
  - Density: 520/sq mi (200/km^{2})
- Time zone: UTC-6 (Central (CST))
  - Summer (DST): UTC-5 (CDT)
- ZIP code: 68380
- Area code: 402
- FIPS code: 31-26875
- GNIS feature ID: 2398429

Lewiston is a village in northwest Pawnee County, Nebraska, United States. The population was 54 at the 2020 census.

== History ==
Lewiston was platted in 1886 when the Chicago, Rock Island & Pacific Railroad was extended to that point.

== Geography ==
According to the United States Census Bureau, the village has a total area of 0.10 square miles (0.26 km^{2}), all land.

== Demographics ==
Historical population
Census	Pop.	Note	%±
1910	127		—
1920	167		31.5%
1930	187		12.0%
1940	158		−15.5%
1950	94		−40.5%
1960	77		−18.1%
1970	88		14.3%
1980	102		15.9%
1990	64		−37.3%
2000	86		34.4%
2010	68		−20.9%
2020	55		−19.1%
2021 (est.)	54	▼	−1.8%
U.S. Decennial Census

=== 2010 census ===
As of the census of 2010, there were 68 people, 30 households, and 15 families residing in the village. The population density was 680.0 inhabitants per square mile (262.5/km^{2}). There were 37 housing units at an average density of 370.0 per square mile (142.9/km^{2}). The racial makeup of the village was 98.5% White and 1.5% African American.

There were 30 households, of which 40.0% had children under the age of 18 living with them, 36.7% were married couples living together, 6.7% had a female householder with no husband present, 6.7% had a male householder with no wife present, and 50.0% were non-families. 43.3% of all households were made up of individuals, and 30% had someone living alone who was 65 years of age or older. The average household size was 2.27 and the average family size was 3.27.

The median age in the village was 37 years. 32.4% of residents were under the age of 18; 2.9% were between the ages of 18 and 24; 25% were from 25 to 44; 17.6% were from 45 to 64; and 22.1% were 65 years of age or older. The gender makeup of the village was 52.9% male and 47.1% female.

=== 2000 census ===
As of the census of 2000, there were 86 people, 33 households, and 22 families residing in the village. The population density was 734.1 inhabitants per square mile (283.4/km^{2}). There were 36 housing units at an average density of 307.3 per square mile (118.6/km^{2}). The racial makeup of the village was 98.84% White and 1.16% Asian.

There were 33 households, out of which 36.4% had children under the age of 18 living with them, 57.6% were married couples living together, 3.0% had a female householder with no husband present, and 33.3% were non-families. 33.3% of all households were made up of individuals, and 15.2% had someone living alone who was 65 years of age or older. The average household size was 2.61 and the average family size was 3.41.

In the village, the population was spread out, with 33.7% under the age of 18, 5.8% from 18 to 24, 24.4% from 25 to 44, 22.1% from 45 to 64, and 14.0% who were 65 years of age or older. The median age was 35 years. For every 100 females, there were 115.0 males. For every 100 females age 18 and over, there were 103.6 males.

As of 2000 the median income for a household in the village was $35,000, and the median income for a family was $35,000. Males had a median income of $27,813 versus $28,438 for females. The per capita income for the village was $12,871. There were no families and 2.2% of the population living below the poverty line, including no under eighteens and none of those over 64.
