= Davenport, Nebraska =

Village in Thayer County, Nebraska, United States

- Village
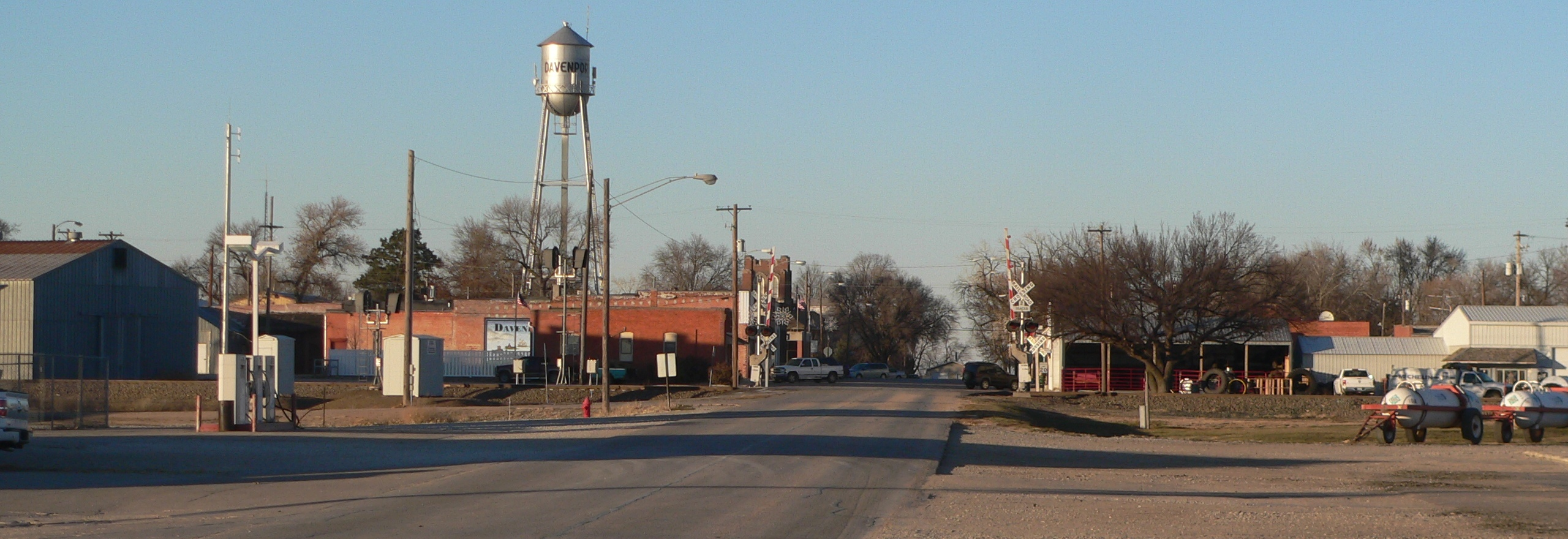
- Davenport, seen from the south along Maple Avenue, November 2013

- Location of Davenport, Nebraska
- Coordinates: 40°18′44″N 97°48′41″W
- Country: United States
- State: Nebraska
- County: Thayer

Area
  - Total: 0.65 sq mi (1.69 km^{2})
  - Land: 0.65 sq mi (1.69 km^{2})
  - Water: 0 sq mi (0.00 km^{2})
- Elevation: 1,657 ft (505 m)

Population (2020)
  - Total: 321
  - Estimate (2021): 313
  - Density: 492/sq mi (190/km^{2})
- Time zone: UTC-6 (Central (CST))
  - Summer (DST): UTC-5 (CDT)
- ZIP code: 68335
- Area code: 402
- FIPS code: 31-12245
- GNIS feature ID: 2398685
- Website: ci.davenport.ne.us

Davenport is a village in Thayer County, Nebraska, United States. The population was 321 at the 2020 census.

== History ==
In 1872, the village was platted by the Nebraska Land and Town Company, and the St. Joseph and Denver City railroad line (later taken over by Union Pacific) was built through the site of village. It was named after Davenport, Iowa. In 1887, the village was officially incorporated. In 1888, North Western Railroad also built a line through the village. Two railroad lines with passenger and freight service brought much business to the village and helped support several hotels.

The public school was established in 1877. A Methodist Society was organized in 1881, a Church of Christ in 1882, Christ Lutheran Church in 1892, and St. Peter Lutheran in 1912.

Major fires destroyed large sections of the business district in 1889, 1917 and 2011.

Also, a Lutheran school once existed, St. Peters Lutheran School, but was closed in 2010 because of lack of students.

== Geography ==
According to the United States Census Bureau, the village has a total area of 0.65 square miles (1.68 km^{2}), all land.

== Demographics ==
Historical population
Census	Pop.	Note	%±
1890	513		—
1900	446		−13.1%
1910	484		8.5%
1920	495		2.3%
1930	477		−3.6%
1940	450		−5.7%
1950	459		2.0%
1960	416		−9.4%
1970	427		2.6%
1980	445		4.2%
1990	383		−13.9%
2000	339		−11.5%
2010	294		−13.3%
2020	319		8.5%
2021 (est.)	313	▼	−1.9%
U.S. Decennial Census

=== 2010 census ===
As of the census of 2010, there were 294 people, 141 households, and 83 families residing in the village. The population density was 452.3 inhabitants per square mile (174.6/km^{2}). There were 175 housing units at an average density of 269.2 per square mile (103.9/km^{2}). The racial makeup of the village was 96.3% White, 1.4% from other races, and 2.4% from two or more races. Hispanic or Latino of any race were 2.4% of the population.

There were 141 households, of which 22.0% had children under the age of 18 living with them, 51.1% were married couples living together, 6.4% had a female householder with no husband present, 1.4% had a male householder with no wife present, and 41.1% were non-families. 39.0% of all households were made up of individuals, and 23.4% had someone living alone who was 65 years of age or older. The average household size was 2.09 and the average family size was 2.77.

The median age in the village was 53 years. 20.7% of residents were under the age of 18; 5.2% were between the ages of 18 and 24; 17% were from 25 to 44; 24.8% were from 45 to 64; and 32.3% were 65 years of age or older. The gender makeup of the village was 46.3% male and 53.7% female.

=== 2000 census ===
As of the census of 2000, there were 339 people, 160 households, and 106 families residing in the village. The population density was 513.0 inhabitants per square mile (198.1/km^{2}). There were 180 housing units at an average density of 272.4 per square mile (105.2/km^{2}). The racial makeup of the village was 98.23% White, 0.29% from other races, and 1.47% from two or more races. Hispanic or Latino of any race were 1.18% of the population.

There were 160 households, out of which 22.5% had children under the age of 18 living with them, 58.8% were married couples living together, 6.3% had a female householder with no husband present, and 33.8% were non-families. 31.3% of all households were made up of individuals, and 18.8% had someone living alone who was 65 years of age or older. The average household size was 2.12 and the average family size was 2.64.

In the village, the population was spread out, with 21.5% under the age of 18, 3.2% from 18 to 24, 22.1% from 25 to 44, 20.9% from 45 to 64, and 32.2% who were 65 years of age or older. The median age was 49 years. For every 100 females, there were 86.3 males. For every 100 females age 18 and over, there were 86.0 males.

As of 2000 the median income for a household in the village was $26,964, and the median income for a family was $33,958. Males had a median income of $23,929 versus $16,563 for females. The per capita income for the village was $13,960. About 11.4% of families and 12.9% of the population were below the poverty line, including 8.0% of those under age 18 and 19.3% of those age 65 or over.

== See also ==
- List of municipalities in Nebraska
