= Daykin, Nebraska =

- Village
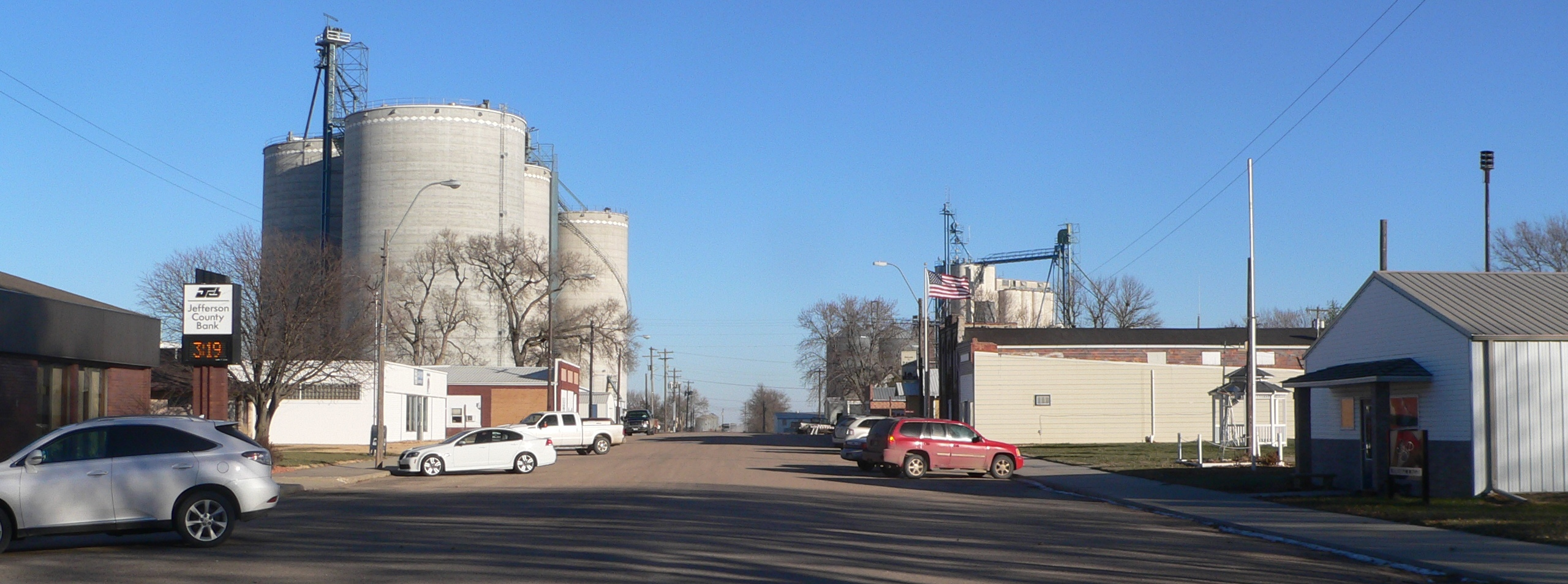
- Downtown Daykin: Jefferson Street

- Location of Daykin, Nebraska
- Coordinates: 40°19′18″N 97°17′54″W
- Country: United States
- State: Nebraska
- County: Jefferson

Area
  - Total: 0.17 sq mi (0.43 km^{2})
  - Land: 0.17 sq mi (0.43 km^{2})
  - Water: 0 sq mi (0.00 km^{2})
- Elevation: 1,532 ft (467 m)

Population (2020)
  - Total: 157
  - Estimate (2021): 157
  - Density: 950/sq mi (370/km^{2})
- Time zone: UTC-6 (Central (CST))
  - Summer (DST): UTC-5 (CDT)
- ZIP code: 68338
- Area code: 402
- FIPS code: 31-12455
- GNIS feature ID: 2398691

Daykin is a village in Jefferson County, Nebraska, United States. The population was 157 at the 2020 census.

== History ==
Daykin was founded by John Daykin, a train conductor and stonemason from Illinois. In 1869, John Daykin purchased land in Jefferson County, Nebraska that would later become Daykin. Besides founding the town, he remains most recognized for conducting the train that returned Abraham Lincoln's body to Springfield, Illinois.

Daykin at one point had a population that reached near 300 people. The town held businesses such as a doctor's office, a butcher, laundromat, veterinarian, hotel, blacksmith, furniture store, jewelry store and many more. The Jefferson County Bank was built in 1887, and has been in continuous operation since then, surviving the market crash of the 1930s.

The former Daykin Public School was held in the present day Daykin Community Building after its erection in 1935. The Daykin Schools became a 12 grade system in 1926. Most of the original 1935 building structure remains, with the lower elementary class buildings being moved and the gym being minimized after a restoration. Today students attend Meridian School. Meridian consist of the residents of Daykin, Fairbury, Western, Alexandria, and Tobias, creating the 303 Nebraska School District.

Two churches are located within Daykin, St. John's Lutheran Church, and St. John's United Methodist Church. The Daykin Immanuel Church is a few miles outside of Daykin. Both churches were created in 1888.

Daykin is known as the "Windmill Town". In the 1930s Daykin was featured in Ripley's Believe It or Not, as having more windmills per capita than any other town in Nebraska. In 1949, a water tower was built. It replaced all but one windmill, which now stands on the lawn in front of the Daykin Community Building as reminder of Daykin's history.

== Geography ==
According to the United States Census Bureau, the village has a total area of 0.16 square miles (0.41 km^{2}), all land.

== Demographics ==
Historical population
Census	Pop.	Note	%±
1900	189		—
1910	220		16.4%
1920	204		−7.3%
1930	187		−8.3%
1940	165		−11.8%
1950	157		−4.8%
1960	144		−8.3%
1970	192		33.3%
1980	207		7.8%
1990	188		−9.2%
2000	177		−5.9%
2010	166		−6.2%
2020	153		−7.8%
2021 (est.)	157	▲	2.6%
U.S. Decennial Census

=== 2010 census ===
As of the census of 2010, there were 166 people, 75 households, and 49 families residing in the village. The population density was 1,037.5 inhabitants per square mile (400.6/km^{2}). There were 84 housing units at an average density of 525.0 per square mile (202.7/km^{2}). The racial makeup of the village was 95.8% White, 3.0% African American, 0.6% from other races, and 0.6% from two or more races. Hispanic or Latino of any race were 4.8% of the population.

There were 75 households, of which 25.3% had children under the age of 18 living with them, 57.3% were married couples living together, 6.7% had a female householder with no husband present, 1.3% had a male householder with no wife present, and 34.7% were non-families. 32.0% of all households were made up of individuals, and 20% had someone living alone who was 65 years of age or older. The average household size was 2.21 and the average family size was 2.80.

The median age in the village was 46 years. 22.3% of residents were under the age of 18; 3.5% were between the ages of 18 and 24; 21% were from 25 to 44; 25.2% were from 45 to 64; and 27.7% were 65 years of age or older. The gender makeup of the village was 49.4% male and 50.6% female.

=== 2000 census ===
As of the census of 2000, there were 177 people, 81 households, and 48 families residing in the village. The population density was 1,050.7 inhabitants per square mile (405.7/km^{2}). There were 90 housing units at an average density of 534.3 per square mile (206.3/km^{2}). The racial makeup of the village was 100% White.

There were 81 households, out of which 23.5% had children under the age of 18 living with them, 55.6% were married couples living together, 3.7% had a female householder with no husband present, and 40.7% were non-families. 40.7% of all households were made up of individuals, and 25.9% had someone living alone who was 65 years of age or older. The average household size was 2.19 and the average family size was 2.98.

In the village, the population was spread out, with 24.3% under the age of 18, 3.4% from 18 to 24, 19.8% from 25 to 44, 24.9% from 45 to 64, and 27.7% who were 65 years of age or older. The median age was 47 years. For every 100 females, there were 75.2 males. For every 100 females age 18 and over, there were 74.0 males.

As of 2000 the median income for a household in the village was $23,333, and the median income for a family was $33,750. Males had a median income of $22,386 versus $19,167 for females. The per capita income for the village was $15,843. About 8.3% of families and 11.3% of the population were below the poverty line, including none of those under the age of eighteen and 16.4% of those 65 or over.
