= Deshler, Nebraska =

City in Thayer County, Nebraska, United States

- City
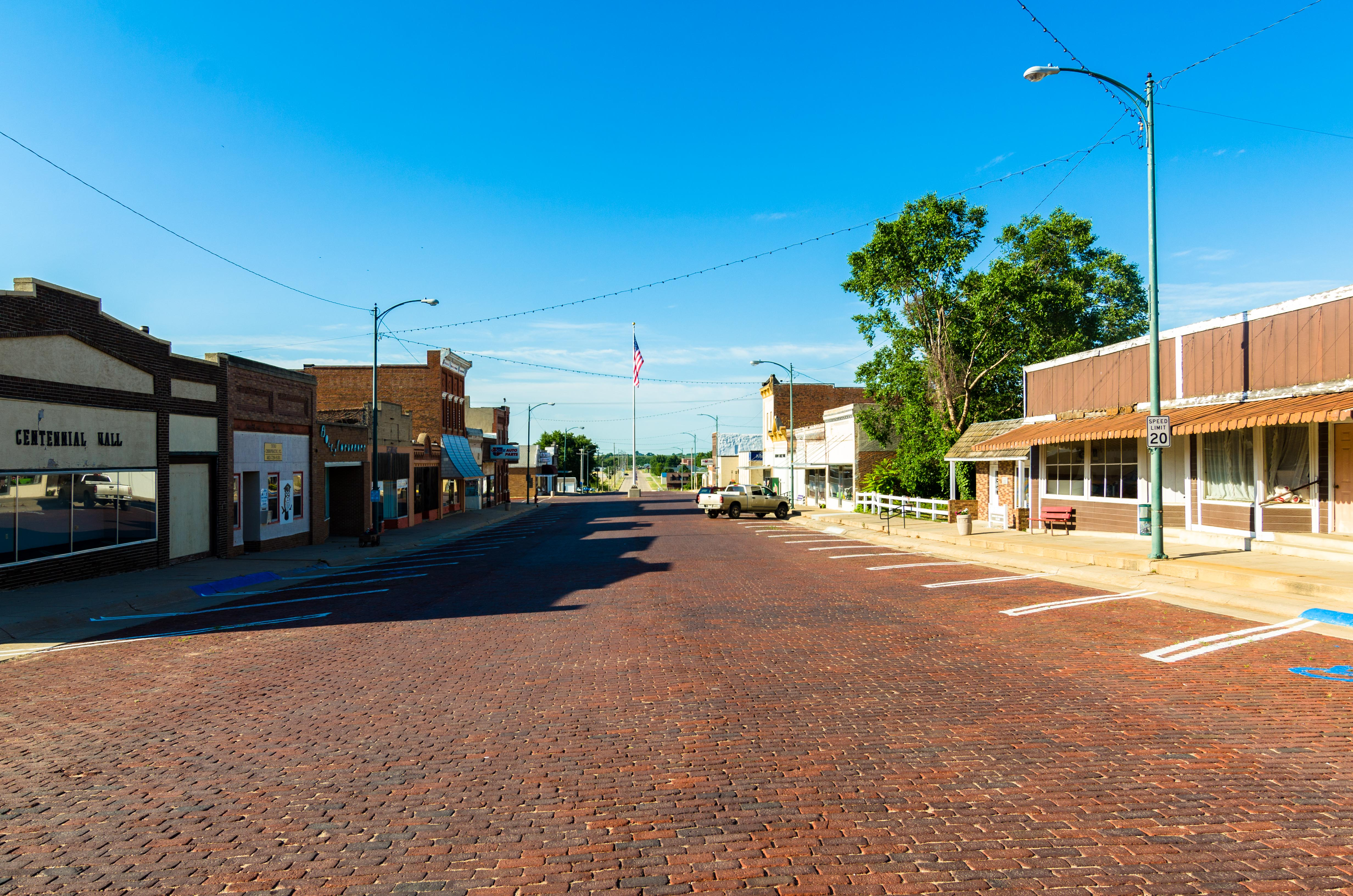
- 4th Street looking south in Deshler, July 2017

- Location of Deshler, Nebraska
- Coordinates: 40°08′23″N 97°43′24″W
- Country: United States
- State: Nebraska
- County: Thayer

Area
  - Total: 0.51 sq mi (1.31 km^{2})
  - Land: 0.51 sq mi (1.31 km^{2})
  - Water: 0 sq mi (0.00 km^{2})
- Elevation: 1,552 ft (473 m)

Population (2020)
  - Total: 752
  - Estimate (2021): 723
  - Density: 1,490/sq mi (574/km^{2})
- Time zone: UTC-6 (Central (CST))
  - Summer (DST): UTC-5 (CDT)
- ZIP code: 68340
- Area code: 402
- FIPS code: 31-12840
- GNIS feature ID: 2394525
- Website: www.deshlernebraska.com

Deshler is a city in Thayer County, Nebraska, United States. The population was 739 at the 2020 census.

== History ==
Deshler was established in 1887 when the Chicago, Rock Island and Pacific Railroad was extended to that point. It was named for John G. Deshler, the original owner of the town site.

== Geography ==
According to the United States Census Bureau, the city has a total area of 0.51 square miles (1.32 km^{2}), all land.

== Demographics ==
Historical population
Census	Pop.	Note	%±
1900	258		—
1910	609		136.0%
1920	944		55.0%
1930	1,177		24.7%
1940	1,037		−11.9%
1950	1,063		2.5%
1960	956		−10.1%
1970	937		−2.0%
1980	997		6.4%
1990	892		−10.5%
2000	879		−1.5%
2010	747		−15.0%
2020	752		0.7%
2021 (est.)	723		−3.9%
U.S. Decennial Census

=== 2010 census ===
As of the census of 2010, there were 747 people, 322 households, and 200 families residing in the city. The population density was 1,464.7 inhabitants per square mile (565.5/km^{2}). There were 392 housing units at an average density of 768.6 per square mile (296.8/km^{2}). The racial makeup of the city was 99.3% White, 0.4% Native American, and 0.3% from two or more races. Hispanic or Latino of any race were 0.5% of the population.

There were 322 households, of which 26.4% had children under the age of 18 living with them, 52.8% were married couples living together, 6.8% had a female householder with no husband present, 2.5% had a male householder with no wife present, and 37.9% were non-families. 36.0% of all households were made up of individuals, and 18.7% had someone living alone who was 65 years of age or older. The average household size was 2.21 and the average family size was 2.88.

The median age in the city was 47 years. 23.4% of residents were under the age of 18; 4.5% were between the ages of 18 and 24; 19.1% were from 25 to 44; 27% were from 45 to 64; and 25.8% were 65 years of age or older. The gender makeup of the city was 47.7% male and 52.3% female.

=== 2000 census ===
As of the census of 2000, there were 879 people, 373 households, and 236 families residing in the city. The population density was 1,768.6 inhabitants per square mile (682.9/km^{2}). There were 412 housing units at an average density of 829.0 per square mile (320.1/km^{2}). The racial makeup of the city was 97.84% White, 0.68% Native American, 0.23% Asian, 0.34% from other races, and 0.91% from two or more races. Hispanic or Latino of any race were 1.71% of the population.

There were 373 households, out of which 27.6% had children under the age of 18 living with them, 55.0% were married couples living together, 5.4% had a female householder with no husband present, and 36.5% were non-families. 34.6% of all households were made up of individuals, and 22.5% had someone living alone who was 65 years of age or older. The average household size was 2.22 and the average family size was 2.84.

In the city, the population was spread out, with 22.4% under the age of 18, 7.3% from 18 to 24, 20.8% from 25 to 44, 19.5% from 45 to 64, and 30.0% who were 65 years of age or older. The median age was 44 years. For every 100 females, there were 89.4 males. For every 100 females age 18 and over, there were 87.9 males.

As of 2000 the median income for a household in the city was $30,667, and the median income for a family was $38,942. Males had a median income of $24,397 versus $18,750 for females. The per capita income for the city was $15,844. About 11.4% of families and 13.2% of the population were below the poverty line, including 25.5% of those under age 18 and 10.5% of those age 65 or over.

== Notable people ==
- Karen Muenster, Minority Whip in the South Dakota Senate

== See also ==
- List of municipalities in Nebraska
