= Little Blue River (Kansas/Nebraska) =

River in Nebraska and Kansas in the United States

Coordinates: 39°41′51″N 96°40′46″W

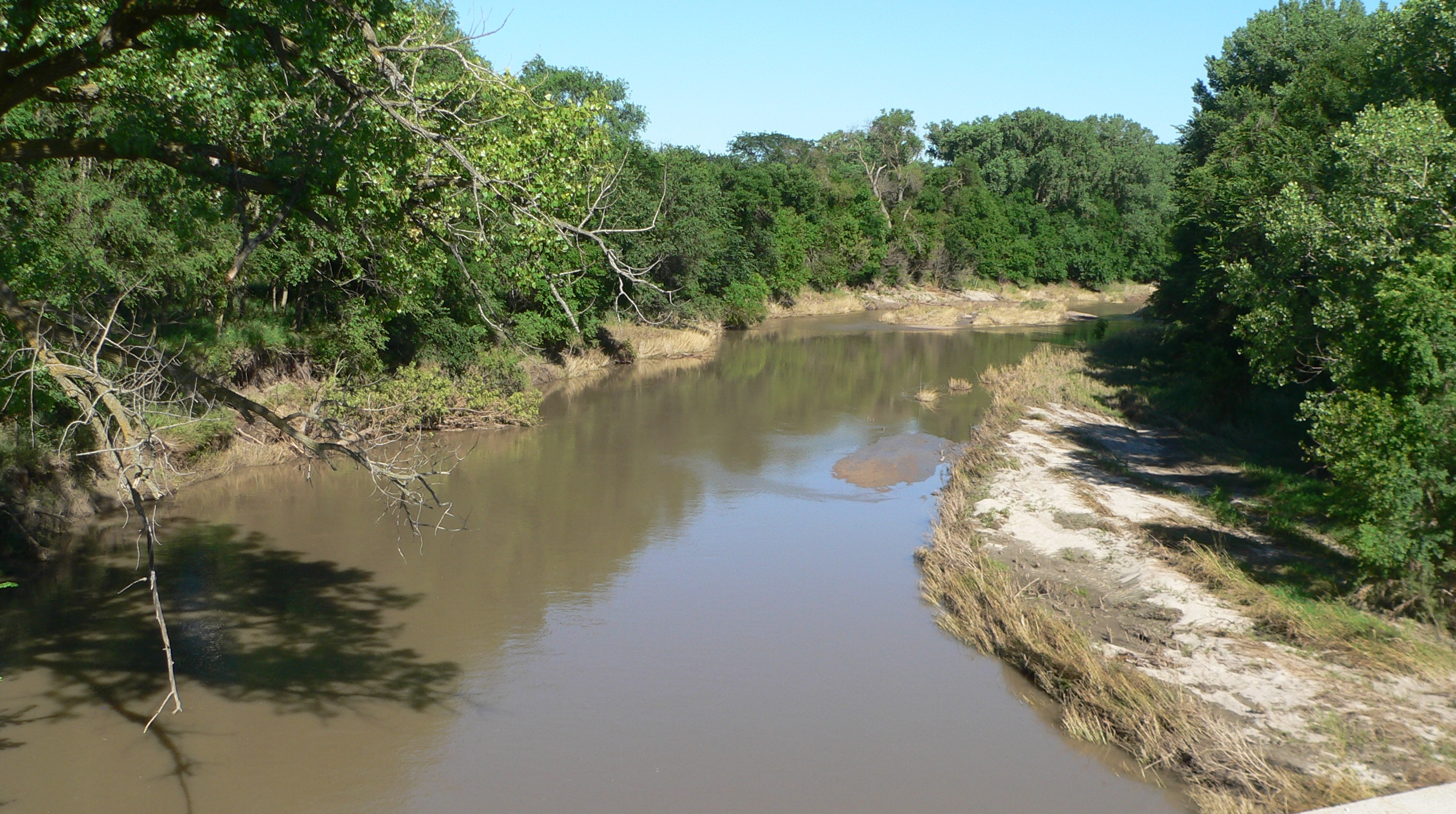
The Little Blue River near Oak, Nebraska, June 2010.

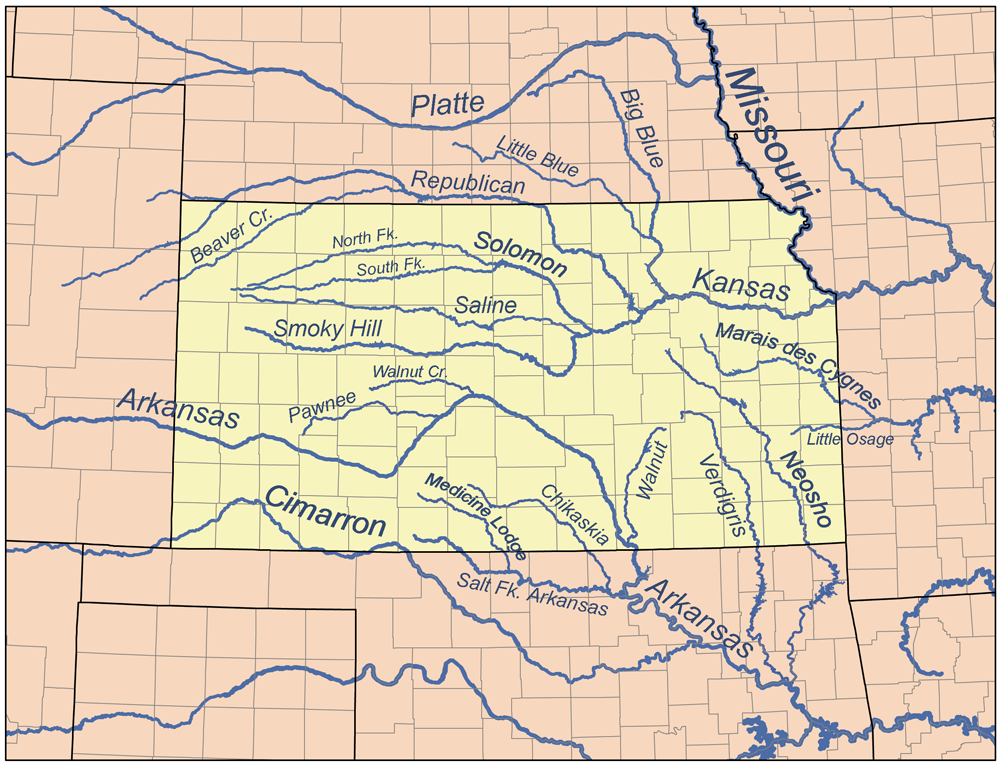
Map of rivers in Kansas with the Little Blue in the north

The Little Blue River is a 245-mile-long (394 km) river in southern Nebraska and northern Kansas in the United States, that was used by Pony Express horseback riders. Ridgelines of this historic watershed defined the wagon train routes first used by Oregon Trail emigrants.

== Description ==
The Little Blue rises just south of Minden in Kearney County, Nebraska. It flows east-southeast past Hebron and Fairbury, Nebraska, and Waterville, Kansas. It joins the Big Blue River at Blue Rapids, Kansas.

The waters of Little Blue River, once noted for the namesake blueish tint, were later muddied by silt runoff from plowing.

== See also ==
- List of rivers of Kansas
- List of rivers of Nebraska
