= List of state highways in Nebraska =

State Highway System
- Highway markers from different years for former N-38 (1932), former N-28 (1950s) and current N-2

System information
- Maintained by NDOT
- Formed: 1917
- State: State Highway No. X (N-X)

System links
- Nebraska State Highway System; Interstate; US; State; Link; Spur; State Spurs; Recreation

In the U.S. state of Nebraska, the Nebraska Department of Transportation (NDOT) maintains a system of state highways. Every significant section of roadway maintained by the state is assigned a number, officially State Highway No. X but also commonly referred to as Nebraska Highway X, as well as N-X. State highways are signed with a white trapezoidal field on a black background with the state, route number and oxen pulled covered wagon displayed in black (see Nebraska State Highway System § Signage). Along with the state highways are a system of spurs and links which provide additional access points for the state highway system. In addition, the Nebraska Game and Parks Commission has designated some roads as Recreational Roads which are maintained by NDOT but are mostly unsigned.

== State highways ==
Number	Length (mi)	Length (km)	Southern or western terminus	Northern or eastern terminus	Formed	Removed	Notes
N-1	—	—	—	—	1925	1926	Became US 20
N-1	26.88	43.26	US 34 south of Elmwood	US 34 / US 75 near Murray	1926	current	Was N-22 from 1922-1924 and N-5A from 1924-1925
N-1A	—	—	—	—	1925	1926	Became N-20B
N-1B	—	—	—	—	1925	1926	Became N-7 (now US-20 and an unnumbered road)
N-1C	—	—	—	—	1925	1935	Became N-20D
N-1D	—	—	—	—	1925	1926	Became N-20E
N-1E	—	—	—	—	1925	1926	Became N-20C
N-1F	—	—	—	—	1925	1926	Became N-20A
N-2	422.29	679.61	SD-71 / N-71 near Crawford US 77 in Lincoln	I-80 near Grand Island Iowa 2 in Nebraska City	1925	current	Highway is split into two segments
N-2A	—	—	—	—	1925	c. 1928	Became N-58; now N-58 and N-68
N-2B	—	—	—	—	—	1926	Became N-59 (later N-7, now part of N-91)
N-3	—	—	—	—	1925	1960	Colorado-Edison became US-34 in 1939, remainder became US-136 in 1960
N-3B	—	—	—	—	1925	c. 1928	Became N-46
N-3C	—	—	—	—	1925	c. 1928	Became N-25
N-3S	—	—	—	—	c. 1935	1960	Became N-8
N-4	—	—	—	—	1925	1926	Became US 81
N-4	205.48	330.69	US 6 / US 34 southwest of Atlanta	US 75 north of Dawson	1926	current	
N-5	—	—	—	—	1925	c. 1933	Became US 73, US 75, N-9 and US 77
N-5	11.04	17.77	US 136 in Deshler	N-4 east of Davenport	1933	current	
N-5A	—	—	—	—	1925	1926	Renumbered N-1
N-5A	—	—	—	—	1926	c. 1928	Became N-51 (later US 73E and US 73; now US 75)
N-5B	—	—	—	—	1925	1926	Renumbered N-5A
N-6	—	—	—	—	1925	1926	Became US 30
N-6	—	—	—	—	1926	c. 1928	Became N-23
N-6	—	—	—	—	c. 1928	1932	Renumbered to N-23 and N-23S to avoid duplication with US 6
N-6A	—	—	—	—	1925	1926	Became N-30A
N-7	—	—	—	—	1925	1926	Became US-38 (now US-6)
N-7	66.54	107.09	N-91 in Brewster	US 183 south of Springview	1926	current	
N-7A	—	—	—	—	1925	1926	Became N-38A
N-7B	—	—	—	—	1925	1926	Became N-38B
N-7C	—	—	—	—	1925	1926	Became N-38C
N-8	—	—	—	—	1925	c. 1957	Became US 281, US 275 and unmarked roads
N-8	148.89	239.62	N-14 in Superior	US 73 in Falls City	1960	current	
N-9	60.83	97.90	US 275 north of West Point	N-12 south of Ponca	1926	current	
N-9A	—	—	—	—	1925	1926	Became N-33
N-9B	—	—	—	—	1925	1926	Became N-51; now N-16 and N-51
N-10	—	—	—	—	1921	1925	Became N-5 (now US 73 and US 75) and unmarked roads
N-10	102.18	164.44	K-8 south of Franklin	N-58 / N-92 at Loup City	1925	current	
N-11	—	—	—	—	1921	1925	Became N-5 (now US 75)
N-11	183.66	295.57	I-80 / S-40D south of Wood River	SD 43 north of Butte	1926	current	
N-11A	—	—	—	—	1926	c. 1928	Became N-54
N-11B	—	—	—	—	1926	c. 1928	Became N-57
N-11C	—	—	—	—	1926	1928	Became N-54
N-12	—	—	—	—	1921	1925	Became N-5 (now US 73 and N-9)
N-12	231.26	372.18	US 83 in Valentine	US 20 west of Jackson	1925	current	
N-13	—	—	—	—	1921	1925	Became N-9 and N-5 (now US 77)
N-13	—	—	—	—	1925	1933	Became US 281 and N-22
N-13	—	—	—	—	1934	1944	Became N-117
N-13	48.54	78.12	US 81 east of Hadar	N-84 south of Center	1944	current	
N-13A	—	—	—	—	1925	1926	Became N-53
N-13E	—	—	—	—	—	—	Became N-18 (now US 281)
N-13W	—	—	—	—	—	—	Became US 281 (now N-11)
N-14	—	—	—	—	1921	1925	Became a portion of N-9
N-14	203.53	327.55	K-14 southwest of Superior	SD 37 northeast of Niobrara	1925	current	
N-14A	—	—	—	—	1925	c. 1928	Became N-52 (now an unnumbered road)
N-15	—	—	—	—	1921	1925	Became a portion of N-9
N-15	210.11	338.14	K-15 south of Fairbury	SD 19 northeast of Maskell	1925	current	
N-16	—	—	—	—	1921	1925	Became N-9 and N-8 (now US-275)
N-16	—	—	—	—	1925	1936	Became N-92
N-16	28.15	45.30	N-51 southeast of Bancroft	N-35 south of Wakefield	1936	current	
N-16A	—	—	—	—	c. 1933	—	Became N-92A (now an unnumbered road)
N-17	—	—	—	—	1921	1925	Became a portion of N-15
N-17	17.43	28.05	K-117 southwest of McCook	US 6 / US 34 in Culbertson	1925	current	
N-18	—	—	—	—	1921	1925	Became N-3 (now US-136) and N-26 (now N-4)
N-18	—	—	—	—	1925	1926	Became US-26
N-18	—	—	—	—	1926	1932	Became US-30
N-18	—	—	—	—	1932	1964	Became US-281
N-18	39.01	62.78	N-23 in Curtis	US 283 south of Elwood	1976	current	Eastern section of this highway is gravel surface; former N-23S
N-18A	—	—	—	—	—	1926	Became N-61
N-19	—	—	—	—	1921	1925	Became a portion of N-3 (now US-136)
N-19	10.91	17.56	CO 113 south of Lorenzo	US 30 west of Sidney	1925	current	
N-20	—	—	—	—	1921	1925	Became N-11 and N-24 (now N-2)
N-20	—	—	—	—	1925	1926	Renumbered to N-23 (later N-16 and US 183; now US 83 and N-92) to avoid duplication with US 20
N-20A	—	—	—	—	1926	c. 1928	Became N-54 (now N-11)
N-20B	—	—	—	—	1926	c. 1928	Became N-55 (later US 83 and US 183, now N-7)
N-20C	—	—	—	—	1926	c. 1928	Became N-60 (now US 83)
N-20D	—	—	—	—	1926	c. 1928	Became a portion of N-27
N-20E	—	—	—	—	1926	c. 1928	Became N-63 (now N-29)
N-21	—	—	—	—	1921	1925	Became N-7 (now US-38)
N-21	73.37	118.08	N-23 near Eustis	N-2 / N-92 in Broken Bow	1925	current	
N-22	—	—	—	—	1921	1925	Became a portion of N-6 (now US-30)
N-22	—	—	—	—	1925	1934	Became US-83 (later US-183 and US-383; now US-183)
N-22	89.25	143.63	N-70 south of Ord	US 81 northwest of Columbus	1934	current	
N-23	—	—	—	—	1921	1925	Became a portion of N-9
N-23	—	—	—	—	1925	1928	Became N-6 (now N-23 and N-18)
N-23	—	—	—	—	1928	1932	Became US 183, N-16 and N-16A
N-23	159.91	257.35	CO 23 in Venango	US 6 / US 34 in Holdrege	1932	current	
N-23N	—	—	—	—	1933	1961	Absorbed into N-23
N-23S	—	—	—	—	1933	—	Became N-18
N-24	—	—	—	—	1921	1925	Became N-11 and N-5A (now N-1)
N-24	—	—	—	—	1925	1933	Became a portion of N-2
N-24	10.38	16.70	US 275 / N-35 in Norfolk	N-57 in Stanton	1933	current	Former portion of N-8
N-24A	—	—	—	—	1925	1926	Became N-43
N-25	—	—	—	—	1921	1925	Became a portion of N-4 (now US-81)
N-25	—	—	—	—	1925	c. 1928	Became N-41
N-25	87.56	140.91	K-25 south of Trenton	US 30 in Sutherland	—	—	
N-25A	6.03	9.70	US 6 in Palisade	N-25 northeast of Palisade	c. 1960	current	Former routing of N-25
N-26	—	—	—	—	1921	1925	Became a portion of N-4 (now US 81)
N-26	—	—	—	—	1925	1926	Renumbered to N-4 to avoid duplication with US 26
N-26A	—	—	—	—	1925	1926	Became N-49
N-27	—	—	—	—	1921	1925	Became a portion of N-4 (now US-81), N-15 and unnumbered roads
N-27	—	—	—	—	1925	1933	Became N-40 and N-16 (now N-92)
N-27	96.61	155.48	K-27 south of Haigler I-80 near Chappell N-2 in Ellsworth	US 34 in Haigler US 26 in Oshkosh SD 391 north of Gordon	1933	current	Highway is split into three segments
N-28	—	—	—	—	1921	1925	Became a portion of N-4 (now US-81) and N-32
N-28	—	—	—	—	1926	1933	Became US 183
N-28	—	—	—	—	1933	1957	Was split into two segments; segment 1 now unnumbered roads and segment 2 now N-121
N-29	—	—	—	—	1921	1925	Became a portion of N-4 (now US-81) and N-12
N-29	55.81	89.82	US 26 in Mitchell	US 20 in Harrison	1925	current	
N-30	—	—	—	—	1921	1925	Became a portion of N-3 (now US-136)
N-30A	—	—	—	—	1926	c. 1928	Became N-47
N-31	—	—	—	—	1921	1925	Became a portion of N-15
N-31	36.33	58.47	N-50 north of Louisville	US 30 southwest of Kennard	1926	current	
N-32	—	—	—	—	1921	1925	Became N-7 (now US-38), N-15 and N-9A
N-32	100.93	162.43	N-14 in Petersburg	US 75 in Tekamah	1926	current	
N-33	—	—	—	—	1921	1925	Became N-11, N-15 and N-7 (now US-38)
N-33	—	—	—	—	1925	1926	Became US 73 (now US 75)
N-33	25.56	41.13	US 6 / N-15 west of Dorchester	US 77 west of Roca	1926	current	
N-34	—	—	—	—	1921	1925	Became a portion of N-15
N-34	—	—	—	—	1925	1933	Became N-16 (now N-92) and US 281
N-34	—	—	—	—	1933	1936	Renumbered to N-63 to avoid duplication with US 34
N-35	—	—	—	—	1921	1925	Became a portion of N-15
N-35	69.51	111.87	US 275 / N-24 in Norfolk	US 75 / US 77 in Dakota City	1926	current	
N-36	—	—	—	—	1921	1925	Became a portion of N-18 (now US-30)
N-36	23.70	38.14	Reichmuth Road near Fremont	US 75 in Omaha	1926	current	
N-37	—	—	—	—	1921	1925	Became a portion of N-8 (now US-275) and N-9
N-37	—	—	—	—	1925	1955	Became N-370
N-37A	—	—	—	—	1925	—	Became N-50
N-38	—	—	—	—	1921	1925	Became N-14A (now N-52) and unnumbered roads
N-38	—	—	—	—	1925	1926	Became N-39
N-38	10.8	17.4	US 275 / N-92 in Omaha	I-480 / US 75 in Omaha	1936	2003	Turned over to the city of Omaha
N-38A	—	—	—	—	1926	c. 1928	Became N-44
N-38B	—	—	—	—	1926	c. 1928	Became N-4 and N-44
N-38C	—	—	—	—	1926	c. 1928	Became a portion of N-48 (later N-106, now S15A)
N-39	—	—	—	—	1921	1925	Became a portion of N-14
N-39	42.05	67.67	N-92 west of Osceola	N-14 southeast of Albion	1926	current	
N-40	—	—	—	—	1921	1925	Became a portion of N-7 (now US-38)
N-40	85.72	137.95	N-92 in Arnold	N-10 north of Kearney	1926	current	
N-41	—	—	—	—	1921	1925	Became a portion of N-2
N-41	103.57	166.68	N-14 / S-18D in Clay Center	N-50 north of Tecumseh	1926	current	Former N-25
N-42	—	—	—	—	1921	1925	Became N-11
N-42	—	—	—	—	c. 1928	c. 1957	Became a portion of N-43
N-43	—	—	—	—	1921	1925	Became N-6 and N-4
N-43	30.22	48.63	N-41 northeast of Adams	US 34 in Eagle	1926	current	
N-44	—	—	—	—	1921	1925	Became N-16
N-44	31.51	50.71	N-4 south of Wilcox	US 30 in Kearney	1926	current	
N-45	—	—	—	—	1921	1925	Became N-13
N-45	—	—	—	—	1926	1933	Former N-7B, absorbed into N-4 and N-44
N-45	—	—	—	—	1933	c. 1957	Became N-10
N-45	27.08	43.58	N-91 south of Newman Grove	US 275 in Tilden	1974	current	Previously N-39 and N-135 before that
N-46	—	—	—	—	1921	1925	Became N-14
N-46	12.00	19.31	N-89 west of Stamford	US 6 / US 34 north of Oxford	1926	current	Former N-3B
N-47	—	—	—	—	1921	1925	Became N-8
N-47	52.14	83.91	N-89 west of Wilsonville N-23 east of Farnam	US 6 / US 34 in Cambridge N-40 south of Arnold	1926	current	Highway is split into two segments; former N-6A
N-48	—	—	—	—	1921	1925	Became N-1F
N-48	—	—	—	—	1926	1957	Became N-106 (now S15A)
N-49	—	—	—	—	1921	1925	Became a portion of N-1 (now US-20)
N-49	—	—	—	—	1926	1957	Former N-18A (later N-61); now unmarked county roads
N-50	—	—	—	—	1921	1925	Became N-12
N-50	91.45	147.17	K-63 south of Du Bois	US 275 / N-92 in Omaha	c. 1932	current	
N-50A	—	—	—	—	c. 1963	—	Became S13K, S13C and S66C and unnumbered county roads
N-51	—	—	—	—	1921	1925	Became N-11C, N-11 and unmarked roads
N-51	36.63	58.95	US 275 northwest of Wisner	Iowa 175 in Decatur	1932	current	
N-52	—	—	—	—	1921	1925	Became N-3
N-52	25.89	41.67	N-14 north of Fullerton	N-91 east of Spalding	1926	current	Former N-18A
N-53	—	—	—	—	1921	1925	Became N-7 (now US-38)
N-53	—	—	—	—	1926	1954	Much of route became N-91 by 1947; remainder became N-80 (now N-70) by 1955
N-53	12.04	19.38	US 136 east of Gilead	N-4 west of Daykin	1977	current	
N-54	—	—	—	—	1921	1925	Became N-10
N-54	—	—	—	—	1926	1933	Former N-11C, became N-11
N-54	—	—	—	—	1933	1957	Former US-73; portions became N-62 and N-67 by 1947; remainder an unnumbered road
N-55	—	—	—	—	1921	1925	Became N-22
N-55	—	—	—	—	1926	1957	Became an unnumbered county road
N-56	—	—	—	—	1921	1925	Became N-7 (now US-6)
N-56	35.28	56.78	US 281 south of Greeley	N-39 west of St. Edward	1926	current	
N-57	—	—	—	—	1921	1925	Became N-23 (later N-6, now US-30)
N-57	—	—	—	—	1926	1947	Became a portion of N-58 (later N-80, now N-70)
N-57	58.17	93.62	N-91 east of Leigh N-98 south of Carroll	US 275 north of Stanton N-12 north of Hartington	1957	current	Highway is split into two segments
N-58	—	—	—	—	1921	1925	Became a portion of N-6 (now US-30)
N-58	52.73	84.86	US 281 south of St. Paul	N-70 east of Arcadia	1926	current	
N-59	—	—	—	—	1921	1925	Became a portion of N-2
N-59	37.49	60.33	N-14 west of Creighton N-57 south of Coleridge	US 81 east of Magnet US 20 / N-15 north of Laurel	1926	current	Highway is split into two segments
N-60	—	—	—	—	1921	1925	Became N-10
N-60	—	—	—	—	1926	1932	Became US 183 (now US 83)
N-60	—	—	—	—	1932	1963	Became N-11
N-61	—	—	—	—	1921	1925	Became N-2A
N-61	234.82	377.91	K-161 south of Benkelman	SD 73 north of Merriman	1926	current	
N-62	—	—	—	—	1921	1925	Became N-34 (later N-16, now N-92) and N-11
N-62	—	—	—	—	1926	1933	
N-62	18.21	29.31	N-50 south of Tecumseh US 75 west of Stella	N-105 east of Elk Creek N-67 east of Shubert	1933	current	Highway is split into two segments
N-63	—	—	—	—	1921	1925	Became N-10 and N-11
N-63	—	—	—	—	1926	1933	Became a portion of N-29
N-63	13.96	22.47	US 34 east of Eagle	US 6 southwest of Ashland	1936	current	
N-64	—	—	—	—	1921	1925	Became a portion of N-10
N-64	44.57	71.73	US 81 south of Columbus US 77 south of Fremont	N-15 north of David City US 75 in Omaha	1926	current	Highway is split into two segments
N-65	—	—	—	—	1921	1925	Became N-1 and N-1B
N-65	—	—	—	—	1926	1933	Became N-61
N-65	15.23	24.51	Bailey-Pawnee Road south of Pawnee City	N-4 in Table Rock	1933	current	Southern section of this highway is gravel surface
N-66	—	—	—	—	1921	1925	Became N-1A (now N-7)
N-66	83.55	134.46	N-14 south of Central City N-15 west of Dwight US 77 south of Wahoo Walnut Street in Louisville	US 81 south of Stromsburg N-79 in Valparaiso Main Street in Louisville US 34 / US 75 west of Plattsmouth	1926	current	Highway is split into four segments
N-67	—	—	—	—	1921	1925	Became N-7 (now US-6), N-21, and N-3B (now N-46)
N-67	66.49	107.01	US 73 east of Verdon	US 34 southwest of Nehawka	1926	current	
N-68	—	—	—	—	1921	1925	Became N-17
N-68	—	—	—	—	1926	1933	Became N-3S (now N-8) and N-102
N-68	11.34	18.25	N-2 south of Ravenna	N-58 in Rockville	1933	current	Former section of N-58
N-69	—	—	—	—	1921	1925	Became N-7 (now US-6)
N-69	—	—	—	—	1926	1957	Became an unnumbered road
N-69	20.87	33.59	US 34 east of Waco	US 81 / N-92 in Shelby	1977	current	
N-70	—	—	—	—	1921	1925	Became N-3 (now US-34)
N-70	—	—	—	—	1926	1951	
N-70	—	—	—	—	c. 1937	—	Became an unmarked county road
N-70	115.78	186.33	N-2 / N-92 east of Broken Bow	N-14 in Elgin	1960	current	
N-71	—	—	—	—	1921	1925	Became a portion of N-6 (now US-30)
N-71	—	—	—	—	1926	1957	Became a portion of N-27
N-71	170.12	273.78	CO 71 south of Kimball	SD 71 northwest of Crawford	1962	current	
N-72	—	—	—	—	1921	1925	Became N-40 and N-16 (now N-92)
N-72	—	—	—	—	1926	1957	Absorbed into N-12
N-73	—	—	—	—	1921	1925	Became a portion of N-2
N-74	—	—	—	—	1921	1925	Became N-2 and N-2B (later N-59 and N-7, now N-91)
N-74	97.71	157.25	N-10 in Minden	N-15 east of Tobias	1926	current	
N-75	—	—	—	—	1921	1925	Became a portion of N-2
N-76	—	—	—	—	1921	1925	Became a portion of N-2
N-76	—	—	—	—	1926	1977	Renumbered to N-53 and N-69 to avoid confusion with I-76
N-77	—	—	—	—	1921	1925	Became a portion of N-1 (now US-20)
N-77A	—	—	—	—	1926	c. 1928	Became a portion of N-33
N-77B	—	—	—	—	1926	c. 1928	Became a portion of N-51
N-78	—	—	—	—	1921	1925	Became a portion of N-1 (now US-20)
N-78	20.02	32.22	K-128 south of Guide Rock	N-4 west of Lawrence	1934	current	
N-79	—	—	—	—	1921	1925	Became a portion of N-1 (now US-20)
N-79	60.36	97.14	US 34 northwest of Lincoln	N-91 in Snyder	1934	current	
N-80	—	—	—	—	1921	1925	Became N-19
N-80	—	—	—	—	1934	1951	Became N-180
N-80	—	—	—	—	1951	1960	Renumbered to N-70 to avoid confusion with I-80
N-81	—	—	—	—	1921	1925	Became N-37 (now N-370), N-16 (now N-92) and unnumbered roads
N-82	—	—	—	—	1921	1925	Became N-6 (now US-30)
N-82	—	—	—	—	1934	1970	Original designation for N-103
N-83	—	—	—	—	1921	1925	Became a portion of N-6 (now US-30)
N-84	—	—	—	—	1921	1925	Became a portion of N-6 (now US-30)
N-84	51.57	82.99	N-14 in Verdigre	N-15 east of Hartington	1934	current	
N-85	—	—	—	—	1921	1925	Became N-18 and N-18A
N-85	—	—	—	—	1934	1969	Became a portion of N-31
N-85	5.01	8.06	N-370 in Papillion	US 275 / N-92 in Ralston and Omaha	1960	2020	Former portion of N-31; transferred to local communities
N-85N	—	—	—	—	—	c. 1961	
N-85S	—	—	—	—	—	c. 1961	
N-86	—	—	—	—	1921	1925	Became a portion of N-18
N-86	—	—	—	—	1934	1964	Became a portion of N-92
N-86A	—	—	—	—	—	1969	Became a portion of N-29; now L79G
N-87	—	—	—	—	1921	1925	Became a portion of N-18
N-87	76.76	123.53	N-2 in Alliance	SD 407 north of Whiteclay	1934	current	
N-88	—	—	—	—	1921	1925	Became a portion of N-29
N-88	59.00	94.95	WYO 151 northwest of Harrisburg	US 385 / N-92 in Bridgeport	1934	current	
N-89	—	—	—	—	c. 1924	1925	Became an unnumbered road
N-89	72.51	116.69	US 83 west of Danbury	US 183 south of Alma	1934	current	
N-90	—	—	—	—	c. 1924	1925	Became a portion of N-7
N-90	—	—	—	—	1934	1957	Became N-151; now L20A
N-91	—	—	—	—	c. 1924	1925	Became a portion of N-8
N-91	230.36	370.73	N-2 north of Dunning	US 30 / US 75 in Blair	1934	current	
N-92	—	—	—	—	c. 1924	1925	Became a portion of N-16 (now N-92)
N-92	—	—	—	—	1934	1939	Became N-16
N-92	489.46	787.71	WYO 92 west of Lyman	US 275 / Iowa 92 in Omaha	1939	current	Longest highway in Nebraska
N-92A	—	—	—	—	—	—	Now part of US 83
N-93	—	—	—	—	c. 1924	1925	Became N-25A and N-24
N-93	—	—	—	—	1934	1947	Became N-64 and an unnumbered road
N-93	—	—	—	—	1947	1957	Former portion of N-31; now an unnumbered road
N-94	—	—	—	—	c. 1924	1925	Became N-37 and N-16 (now N-92)
N-94	17.92	28.84	N-9 / N-16 in Pender	US 75 northwest of Macy	1934	current	
N-95	—	—	—	—	c. 1924	1925	Became a portion of N-19
N-95	16.54	26.62	N-11 west of Chambers	US 281 east of Chambers	1934	current	
N-96	—	—	—	—	c. 1924	1925	Became an unnumbered road
N-96	—	—	—	—	1935	1961	Became an unnumbered road
N-96	20.05	32.27	US 183 north of Taylor	N-91 south of Burwell	1997	current	
N-97	140.78	226.56	US 83 north of North Platte	US 20 in Valentine	1935	current	
N-98	20.46	32.93	N-13 in Pierce	N-35 west of Wayne	1935	current	
N-99	13.05	21.00	K-99 south of Burchard	N-4 north of Burchard	1935	current	
N-100	—	—	—	—	1935	1974	Became L82A
N-101	—	—	—	—	1935	1961	First used by 1936 from Belfast to Greenley; decommissioned around 1947 and reassigned to an old routing of US 281 from Bartlett via Spaulding to N-56; extended south to N-22 by 1955; decommissioned before 1961 and is now an unnumbered road
N-102	—	—	—	—	1935	1957	One portion became State Spur 203S (later State Spur 208); now S34A
N-103	50.59	81.42	N-8 south of Diller N-4 east of Plymouth	US 136 north of Diller I-80 north of Pleasant Dale	1935	current	Highway is split into two segments
N-104	—	—	—	—	1935	1950	Became N-66
N-104	—	—	—	—	1955	1961	Became an unnumbered road
N-104	—	—	—	—	1957	1970	Became S91A
N-105	32.85	52.87	N-8 south of Humboldt	N-67 west of Brock	1935	current	
N-106	—	—	—	—	1935	1957	Became State Spur 1183 (now S21C)
N-107	—	—	—	—	1935	1957	Became State Spur 330 (now S56A)
N-108	—	—	—	—	1935	1957	Former portion of N-8; portions became State Spurs 320 and 420 (now S45A and L45B), remainder an unnumbered road
N-109	16.07	25.86	US 77 / N-92 in Wahoo	US 77 south of Fremont	1935	current	
N-110	2.26	3.64	N-35 west of Dakota City	US 20 west of South Sioux City	1936	current	
N-111	—	—	—	—	1936	1947	Became a portion of rerouted N-14
N-112	15.69	25.25	K-148 southwest of Odell	US 77 west of Blue Springs	1939	current	
N-113	—	—	—	—	1941	1957	Became an unnumbered road
N-114	—	—	—	—	1941	1957	Became an unnumbered road
N-115	—	—	—	—	1941	1957	Existed in two segments; renumbered N-57
N-116	6.60	10.62	N-15 west of Concord	US 20 north of Dixon	1941	current	
N-117	—	—	—	—	1941	1957	Former routing of US 20; became an unnumbered road
N-118	—	—	—	—	1941	1957	Former routing of N-51; became an unnumbered road
N-119	—	—	—	—	1941	1957	Became State Spur 214 (now S18B)
N-120	—	—	—	—	1957	1973	Downgraded to S23A
N-121	55.03	88.56	N-32 west of Madison N-13 northwest of Pierce N-12 west of Crofton	US 275 north of Battle Creek N-84 east of Bloomfield US 81 northeast of Crofton	1941	current	Highway is split into three segments
N-123	—	—	—	—	1941	1957	Became an unnumbered road
N-127	—	—	—	—	1941	1969	Became a portion of N-15
N-128	16.84	27.10	N-50 south of Syracuse	US 75 south of Nebraska City	1941	current	
N-129	—	—	—	—	1941	1970	Renumbered N-128 to avoid confusion with I-129
N-130	—	—	—	—	1941	1957	Became a portion of N-64
N-131	1.4	2.3	N-370 in Bellevue	US 75 in Bellevue	1965	1990	Now Cornhusker Road and Galvin Road
N-132	—	—	—	—	1947	1957	Became a portion of N-64
N-133	19.18	30.87	US 6 in Omaha	US 30 in Blair	1947	current	
N-134	—	—	—	—	1941	1957	Became an unnumbered road
N-135	—	—	—	—	1950	1957	Became N-39 (now N-45)
N-137	29.74	47.86	US 20 in Newport	SD 47 west of Naper	1950	current	
N-151	—	—	—	—	1957	1961	Former portion of N-90; renumbered N-15 (now L20A)
N-180	—	—	—	—	1950	1957	Former N-80; renumbered State Spur 302 to avoid confusion with I-180; now S21A
N-370	16.16	26.01	US 6 / N-31 in Gretna	US 75 in Bellevue	c. 1953	current	Former portions of N-37, N-50, and N-31
N-434	—	—	—	—	1957	1960	Former N-50; became N-50A (now S13K)
Former
