= Nebraska Highway 14 =

State highway in Nebraska, U.S.

State Highway 14

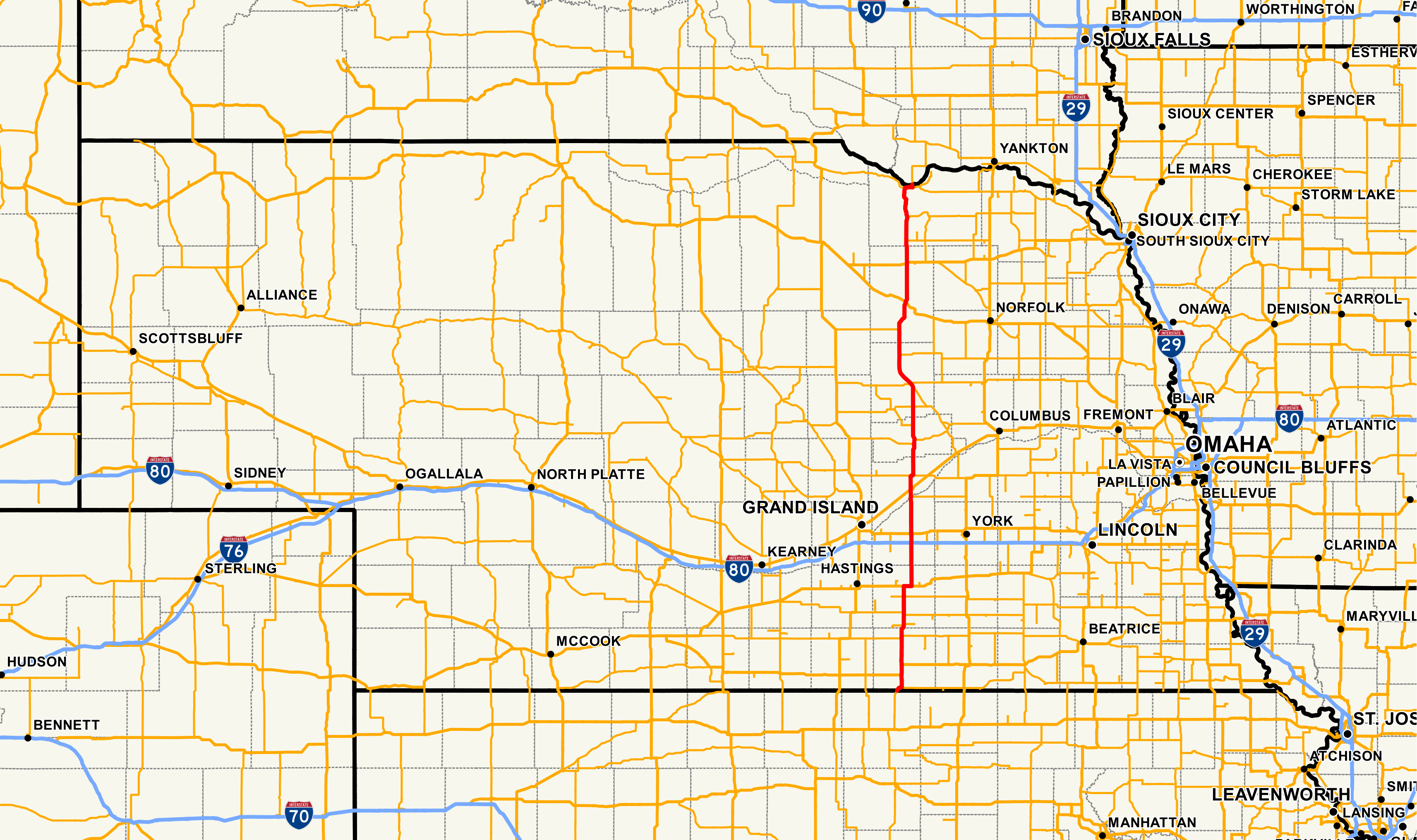
- Nebraska Highway 14 highlighted in red

Route information
- Maintained by NDOT
- Length: 203.53 mi (327.55 km)
- Existed: 1925–present

Major junctions
- South end: K-14 southwest of Superior
- US 136 north of Superior; US 6 southeast of Harvard; I-80 near Aurora; US 34 in Aurora; US 30 in Central City; N-92 north of Central City; US 275 in Neligh; US 20 west of Brunswick; N-12 in Niobrara
- North end: SD 37 northeast of Niobrara

Location
- Country: United States
- State: Nebraska
- Counties: Nuckolls, Clay, Hamilton, Merrick, Nance, Boone, Antelope, Knox

Highway system
- Nebraska State Highway System; Interstate; US; State; Link; Spur; State Spurs; Recreation
← N-13	→ N-15

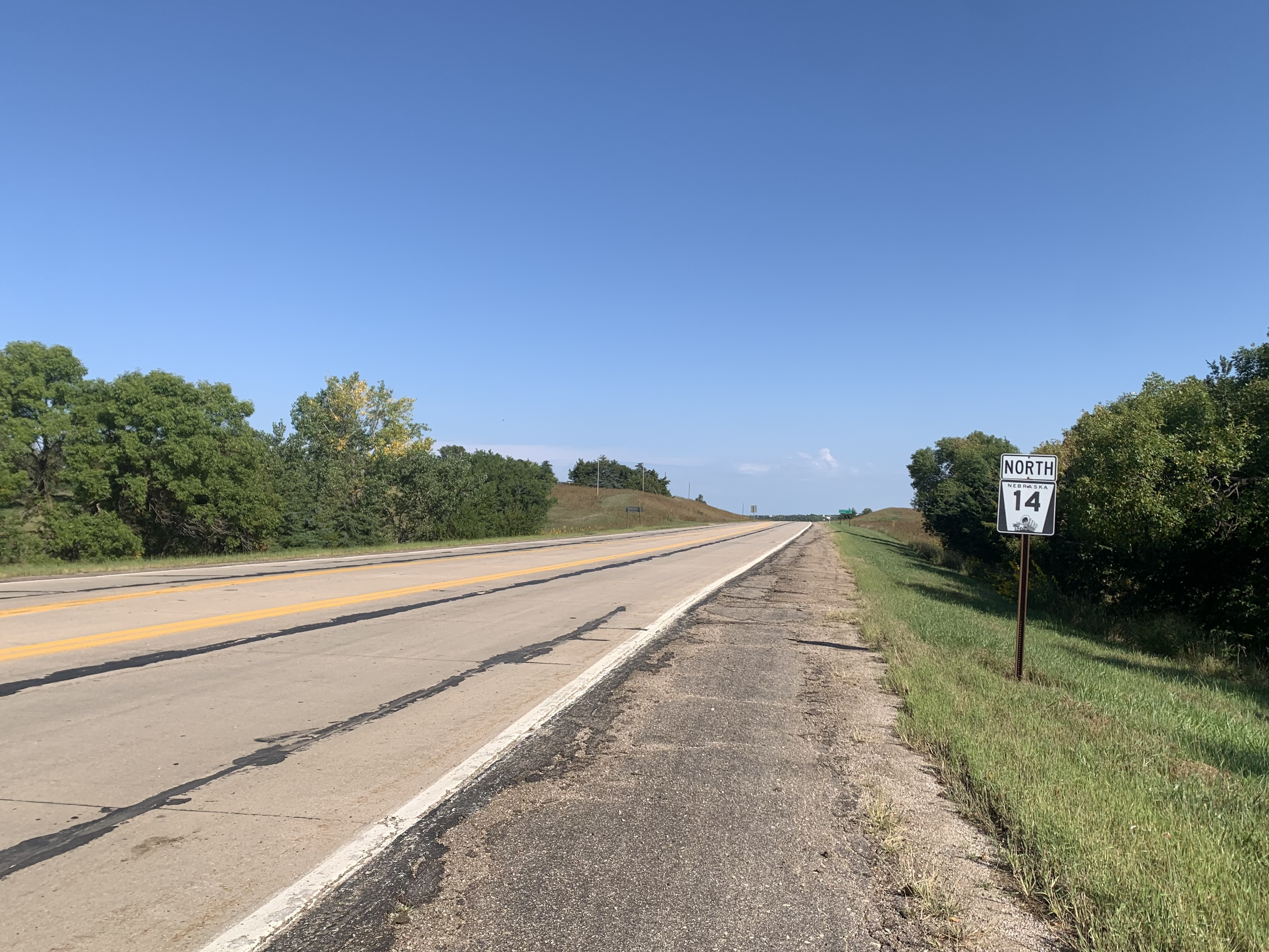
Nebraska Highway 14 in Nuckolls County, Nebraska

Nebraska Highway 14 (N-14) is a highway in the U.S. state of Nebraska. It has a southern terminus at the Kansas border, where it continues south as K-14, southwest of Superior and a northern terminus east of Niobrara at the South Dakota border.

== Route description ==
Nebraska Highway 14 begins at the Kansas border southwest of Superior. This southern terminus for NE 14 is also the northern terminus for K-14. It goes northeast through farmland towards Superior, crosses the Republican River, then turns east into Superior. It meets Nebraska Highway 8 there, then turns north. It meets U.S. Highway 136 and they run concurrent for 4 miles (6.4 km). They separate, and NE 14 continues north into Nelson. It continues north, runs briefly concurrent with Nebraska Highway 4 and Nebraska Highway 74, then goes through Clay Center. At Clay Center, it meets Nebraska Highway 41. After 4 more miles, it meets U.S. Highway 6, then turns east with it for 3 miles (4.8 km). It turns north, and shortly before arriving in Aurora, intersects Interstate 80. In Aurora, it meets U.S. Highway 34. It continues north and meets Nebraska Highway 66 just before passing the Platte River. It crosses the Platte, and enters Central City, where it meets U.S. Highway 30.

After Central City, it briefly overlaps Nebraska Highway 92 before continuing north towards Fullerton. At Fullerton, it meets Nebraska Highway 22 and they run together north for a couple miles. It goes north and shortly before Albion, meets Nebraska Highway 39 and turns northwesterly to go through Albion. At Loretto, it turns due north again, then north of Elgin, it turns northeasterly towards Neligh. At Neligh, NE 14 meets U.S. Highway 275. It continues due north out of Neligh, meeting U.S. Highway 20 near Brunswick. It continues north through Verdigre and at Niobrara meets Nebraska Highway 12. It turns east briefly, then turns north to go into South Dakota via the Chief Standing Bear Memorial Bridge, which crosses the Missouri River, where the highway continues north as South Dakota Highway 37.

== History ==
Nebraska Highway 14 originally ended in Neligh. It also originally went east from Fullerton to Genoa along the current NE 22, then northwest to Albion along current NE 39. When originally extended to Niobrara, it went north through Center along the current Nebraska Highway 13.

Nebraska Highway 14 previously ended in Niobrara, but in 1998, the Chief Standing Bear Memorial Bridge was opened. The bridge, which was named for the former Ponca Indian chief, crosses over the Missouri River and replaced a long-standing river ferry which crossed at the same site. The completion of this bridge made it a cross-state highway.

== Highway designations ==
The portion it shares with U.S. Highway 136 is the Heritage Highway. When it is concurrent with U.S. Highway 6, it is the Grand Army of the Republic Highway. Its concurrency with Nebraska Highway 12 is the Outlaw Trail Scenic Byway.

== Major intersections ==
County	Location	mi	km	Destinations	Notes
Nuckolls		0.00	0.00	K-14 south	Continuation into Kansas
Nuckolls	Superior	2.35	3.78	N-8 east (3rd Street east)	Western terminus of N-8; former N-3S
Nuckolls		7.25	11.67	US 136 west	South end of US 136 overlap; former N-3 west
Nuckolls		11.26	18.12	US 136 east	North end of US 136 overlap; former N-3 east
Nuckolls		21.31	34.30	N-4 west	South end of N-4 overlap
Nuckolls		22.32	35.92	N-4 east / Oregon National Historic Trail / California National Historic Trail / Pony Express National Historic Trail	North end of N-4 overlap
Clay		26.67	42.92	S-18C west (Road 302) – Deweese	
Clay		27.17	43.73	S-18B east – Edgar	Former N-119
Clay	Fairfield	30.68	49.37	N-74 east (Road 306)	South end of N-74 overlap
Clay	Fairfield	31.68	50.98	N-74 west (Road 307) / Oregon National Historic Trail / California National Historic Trail / Pony Express National Historic Trail	North end of N-74 overlap
Clay	Clay Center	37.68	60.64	N-41 east / S-18D west – U.S. Meat Animal Research Center	Western terminus of N-41; eastern terminus of S-18D
Clay		41.67	67.06	US 6 west	South end of US 6 overlap
Clay		44.64	71.84	US 6 east	North end of US 6 overlap
Hamilton		61.16	98.43	I-80 – Lincoln, Grand Island	I-80 exit 332
Hamilton	Aurora	64.67	104.08	US 34 (Q Street) – York, Grand Island	Access to Memorial Hospital
Hamilton		73.70	118.61	S-41C west (22 Road) – Marquette	
Hamilton		78.68	126.62	N-66 east (27 Road)	
Platte River		78.90	126.98	Bridge	
Merrick	Central City	81.49	131.15	US 30	
Merrick		86.67	139.48	N-92 west	South end of N-92 overlap
Merrick		87.68	141.11	N-92 east	North end of N-92 overlap
Nance	Fullerton	99.72	160.48	N-22 west (Third Street)	South end of N-22 overlap
Nance		101.36	163.12	N-22 east	North end of N-22 overlap
Nance		107.03	172.25	N-52 north	
Boone		114.01	183.48	N-56 – Cedar Rapids, St. Edward	
Boone		121.50	195.54	265th Street (L-6A east)	
Boone		121.60	195.70	N-39 south	Northern terminus of N-39
Boone	Albion	122.70	197.47	N-91 east	South end of N-91 overlap
Boone	Albion	123.06	198.05	N-91 west (State Street west)	North end of N-91 overlap
Boone	Petersburg	135.67	218.34	N-32 east (Leona Avenue)	
Antelope	Elgin	145.13	233.56	N-70 west (North Street)	Former N-80
Antelope	Neligh	156.27	251.49	US 275 (11th Street)	
Antelope		171.01	275.21	US 20 – Royal, Sioux City	
Knox		179.30	288.56	N-59 east	Western terminus of N-59
Knox	Verdigre	188.08	302.69	N-84 east / S-54A west	Western terminus of N-84; eastern terminus of S-54A
Knox	Niobrara	199.56	321.16	N-12 west	South end of N-12 overlap
Knox		202.42	325.76	N-12 east	North end of N-12 overlap
Missouri River		203.53	327.55	Chief Standing Bear Memorial Bridge; Nebraska–South Dakota line	
Missouri River		203.53	327.55	SD 37 north	Continuation into South Dakota
1.000 mi = 1.609 km; 1.000 km = 0.621 mi: Concurrency terminus
