= Nebraska Highway 91 =

State highway in Nebraska, U.S.

State Highway 91

Route information
- Maintained by NDOT
- Length: 230.36 mi (370.73 km)
- Existed: 1934–present

Major junctions
- West end: N-2 north of Dunning
- N-7 south of Brewster; US 183 in Taylor; N-11 south of Burwell; N-70 west of Ericson; US 281 east of Ericson; N-14 in Albion; US 81 northeast of Humphrey; N-15 west of Howells; US 275 east of Snyder; US 77 southeast of Hooper
- East end: US 30 / US 75 in Blair

Location
- Country: United States
- State: Nebraska
- Counties: Blaine, Loup, Garfield, Greeley, Boone, Platte, Colfax, Dodge, Washington

Highway system
- Nebraska State Highway System; Interstate; US; State; Link; Spur; State Spurs; Recreation
← N-89	→ N-92

Nebraska Highway 91 is a highway in central and eastern Nebraska. Its western terminus is at an intersection with Nebraska Highway 2 north of Dunning. Its eastern terminus is at an intersection with U.S. Highway 30 and U.S. Highway 75 in Blair.

== Route description ==
Nebraska Highway 91 begins at an intersection with NE 2 just north of Dunning. It heads in a northeasterly direction through the Sand Hills, where it has an intersection with NE 7 south of Brewster. The highway continues to the east and southeast into farmland, heading into Taylor. In Taylor, NE 91 meets US 183 and runs concurrently southward with it for about a mile. NE 91 then splits off and head eastward, where it intersects with NE 11 south of Burwell. NE 91 and NE 11 run concurrently northward for a couple of miles as it passes through Burwell, before splitting off to head east again. West of Ericson, the highway intersects NE 70, where it then runs concurrently with that route for about 20 miles (32 km).

Further east, NE 91/NE 70 intersect with US 281, which is where the overlap with NE 70 ends. NE 91 then runs concurrently southward. NE 91 then splits off and head eastward some more, passing through Spalding. After leaving Spalding, the highway passes NE 52. To the east, it enters Albion where it intersects with NE 14. Further east, it passes NE 45 before entering Lindsay. NE 91 intersects US 81 northeast of Humphrey. The highway continues to the east, where it passes NE 57 north of Leigh, as well as NE 15 southeast of Clarkson.

In Snyder, NE 91 passes by NE 79 before continuing eastward. East of Snyder, it meets and runs concurrently southeastward with US 275. After passing through Scribner and bypassing Hooper, NE 91/US 275 meet with US 77 and run concurrently southward along it as well. North of Fremont, NE 91 splits off to the east yet again. It continues eastward through Nickerson and continues into Blair, where it terminates at an intersection with US 30 and US 75.

== Major intersections ==
County	Location	mi	km	Destinations	Notes
Blaine	Dunning	0.00	0.00	N-2	
Blaine	Brewster	15.09	24.29	N-7 north	
Loup	Taylor	44.94	72.32	US 183 north (3rd Street)	West end of US 183 overlap
Loup	Taylor	45.96	73.97	US 183 south	Eastern end of US 183 overlap
Garfield	Burwell	58.37	93.94	N-96 west	
Garfield	Burwell	59.36	95.53	N-11 south	Western end of N-11 overlap
Garfield	Burwell	61.35	98.73	N-11 north	Eastern end of N-11 overlap
Garfield		77.41	124.58	N-70 south	Western end of N-70 overlap
Wheeler	Ericson	91.00	146.45	US 281 north / N-70 east	Eastern end of N-70 overlap, western end of US 281 overlap
Greeley		96.97	156.06	US 281 south	Eastern end of US 281 overlap
Boone		112.31	180.75	N-52 south	
Boone	Albion	125.45	201.89	N-14 north (South 6th Street)	Western end of N-14 overlap
Boone	Albion	125.81	202.47	N-14 south	Eastern end of N-14 overlap
Platte		137.55	221.37	N-45 north	
Platte	Cornlea	148.51	239.00	S-71F south	
Platte	Humphrey	153.51	247.05	US 81	
Platte	Creston	158.99	255.87	S-71C south	
Colfax	Leigh	165.71	266.68	S-19A south	
Colfax	Leigh	166.96	268.70	N-57 north	
Colfax	Clarkson	171.95	276.73	S-19B north (Bryan Street)	
Colfax		174.95	281.55	N-15	
Colfax	Howells	177.87	286.25	S-19C north	
Dodge	Dodge	183.87	295.91	S-27A north	
Dodge	Snyder	189.02	304.20	N-79 south (Range Line Street)	
Dodge		193.31	311.10	US 275 north	Western end of US 275 overlap
Dodge	Hooper	204.90	329.75	S-27D north	
Dodge		207.34	333.68	US 77 north	Interchange, western end of US 77 overlap
Dodge	Nickerson	211.19	339.88	US 77 / US 275 south	Eastern end of US 77 and US 275 overlaps
Washington	Blair	230.36	370.73	US 30 west / US 75 north (19th Street) / US 30 east / US 75 south (Washington Street)	
1.000 mi = 1.609 km; 1.000 km = 0.621 mi: Concurrency terminus
