= Nebraska Highway 56 =

State highway in Nebraska, U.S.

State Highway 56

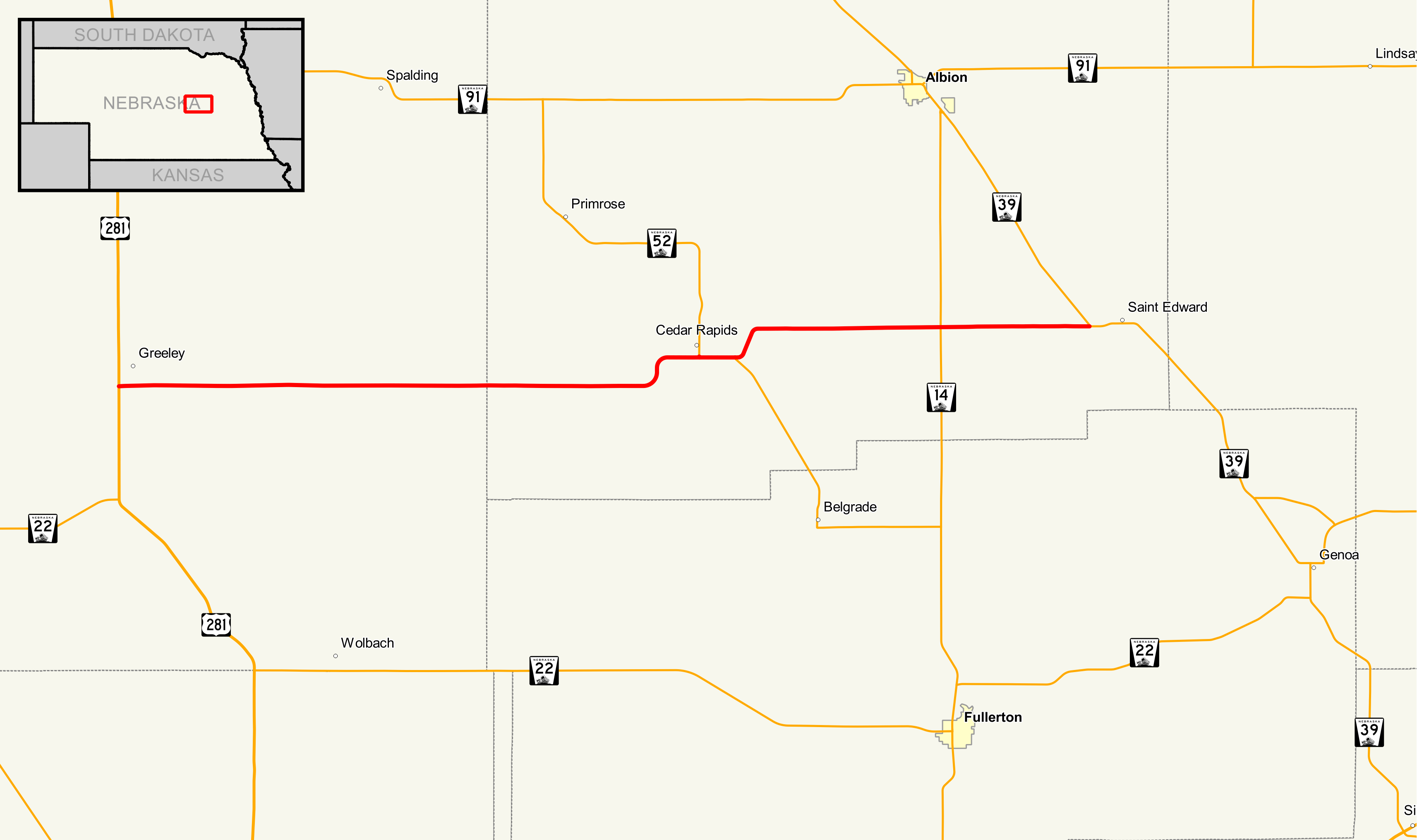
- Nebraska Highway 56 highlighted in red

Route information
- Maintained by NDOT
- Length: 35.28 mi (56.78 km)
- Existed: 1932–present

Major junctions
- West end: US 281 south of Greeley
- N-52 in Cedar Rapids; N-14 east of St. Edward
- East end: N-39 west of St. Edward

Location
- Country: United States
- State: Nebraska
- Counties: Greeley, Boone

Highway system
- Nebraska State Highway System; Interstate; US; State; Link; Spur; State Spurs; Recreation
← N-53	→ N-57

Nebraska Highway 56 is a highway in central Nebraska. It is an east–west highway which has a length of 35 miles (56 km). The western terminus is near Greeley at U.S. Highway 281, and the eastern terminus is at Nebraska Highway 39 just west of St. Edward.

== Route description ==
Nebraska Highway 56 begins less than a mile south of Greeley at U.S. 281. It runs east through farmland to Cedar Rapids, where it meets Nebraska Highway 52. The two highway run concurrent east of Cedar Rapids for about a mile, then separate. After going northeast briefly, the highway continues east towards St. Edward, passing Nebraska Highway 14 and ending about a mile west of St. Edward at Highway 39.

== Major intersections ==
County	Location	mi	km	Destinations	Notes
Greeley		0.00	0.00	US 281	Western terminus
Boone	Cedar Rapids	20.99	33.78	N-52 north (South 4th Street)	West end of N-52 overlap
Boone		22.25	35.81	N-52 south	East end of N-52 overlap
Boone		30.06	48.38	N-14	
Boone		35.28	56.78	N-39	Eastern terminus
1.000 mi = 1.609 km; 1.000 km = 0.621 mi: Concurrency terminus
