= Nebraska Highway 39 =

State highway in Nebraska, U.S.

State Highway 39

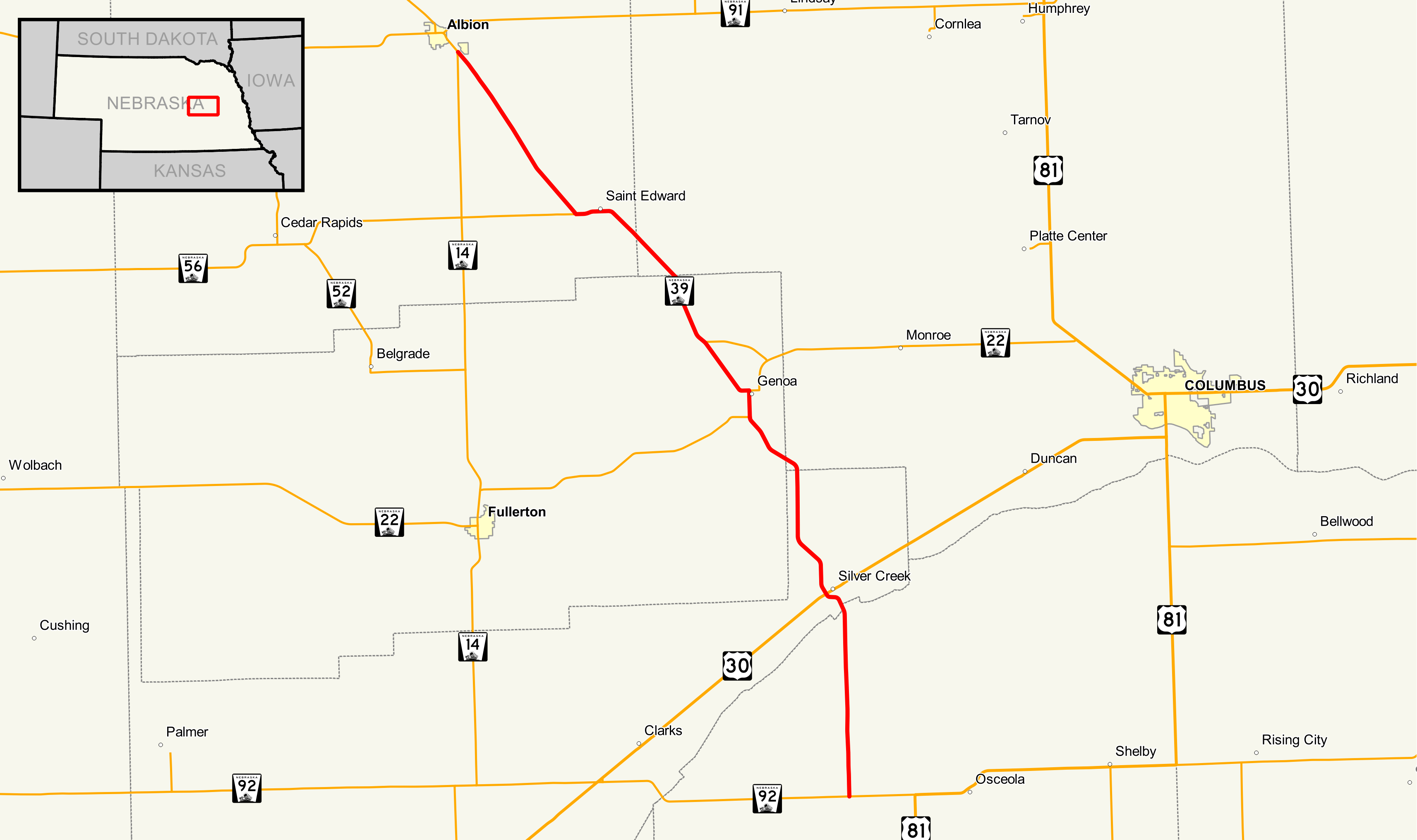
- Nebraska Highway 39 highlighted in red

Route information
- Maintained by NDOT
- Length: 42.05 mi (67.67 km)
- Existed: 1933–present

Major junctions
- South end: N-92 west of Osceola
- US 30 in Silver Creek
- North end: N-14 southeast of Albion

Location
- Country: United States
- State: Nebraska
- Counties: Polk, Merrick, Platte, Nance, Boone

Highway system
- Nebraska State Highway System; Interstate; US; State; Link; Spur; State Spurs; Recreation
← N-36	→ N-40

Nebraska Highway 39 is a highway in central Nebraska. It runs for a length of 42.05 miles (67.67 km). It has a southern terminus west of Osceola at an intersection with Nebraska Highway 92. Its northern terminus is at an intersection with Nebraska Highway 14 southeast of Albion.

== Route description ==
Nebraska Highway 39 begins in rural Polk County west of Osceola at Nebraska Highway 92. It goes north through farmland, crosses the Platte River and meets U.S. Highway 30 at Silver Creek. It runs northwesterly and crosses over the Loup River shortly before meeting Nebraska Highway 22. NE 39 and NE 22 then overlap into Genoa. They separate and NE 39 continues northwest into St. Edward. It goes west out of St. Edward and at an intersection with Nebraska Highway 56, turns northwest again. Shortly before Albion, the highway meets Nebraska Highway 14 and ends.

== Major intersections ==
County	Location	mi	km	Destinations	Notes
Polk		0.00	0.00	N-92 (130th Road) – Omaha, St. Paul	Southern terminus; road continues unpaved as J Road
Platte River		8.82	14.19	Bridge	
Merrick	Silver Creek	9.76	15.71	US 30 (Lincoln Highway) – Clarks, Columbus, Silver Creek, Grand Island	
Platte	No major junctions				
Nance		19.28	31.03	N-22 west (495th Street)	South end of N-22 overlap
Nance	Genoa	20.49	32.98	N-22 east (Willard Avenue east)	North end of N-22 overlap
Nance		23.63	38.03	L-63A east	Western terminus of L-63A
Platte	No major junctions				
Boone		32.86	52.88	N-56 west	Eastern terminus of N-56
Boone		41.93	67.48	265th Street (L-6A) to N-14 south – Fullerton	
Boone		42.05	67.67	N-14 north – Albion	Continuation beyond northern terminus
1.000 mi = 1.609 km; 1.000 km = 0.621 mi: Concurrency terminus
