= Nebraska Highway 22 =

State highway in Nebraska, U.S.

State Highway 22

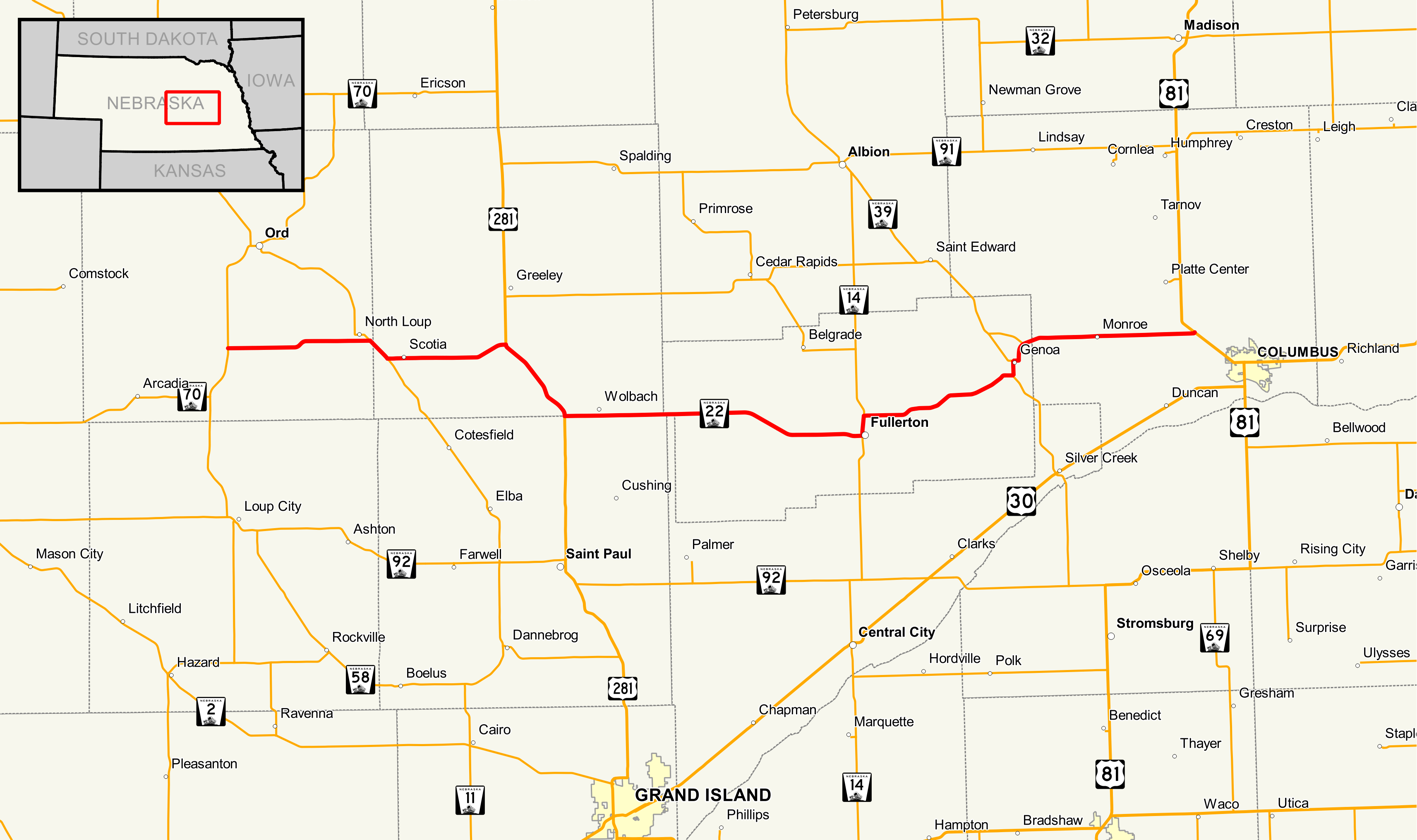
- Nebraska Highway 22 highlighted in red

Route information
- Maintained by NDOT
- Length: 89.25 mi (143.63 km)
- Existed: 1933–present

Major junctions
- West end: N-70 south of Ord
- N-11 southeast of North Loup; US 281 south of Greeley; N-14 in Fullerton; N-39 south of Genoa
- East end: US 81 northwest of Columbus

Location
- Country: United States
- State: Nebraska
- Counties: Valley, Greeley, Howard, Merrick, Nance, Platte

Highway system
- Nebraska State Highway System; Interstate; US; State; Link; Spur; State Spurs; Recreation
← N-21	→ N-23

Nebraska Highway 22 is a highway in central Nebraska. It runs east–west for 89.25 miles (143.63 km). Its western terminus is at Nebraska Highway 70 south of Ord. Its eastern terminus is at U.S. Highway 81 northwest of Columbus.

== Route description ==
Nebraska Highway 22 begins at Nebraska Highway 70 south of Ord in rural Valley County, heading east into farmland. At North Loup, NE 22 meets Nebraska Highway 11 and they are paired together for 2 miles (3.2 km). Near Scotia, it turns east and goes through Scotia before meeting U.S. Highway 281. The two highways are paired together and separate near Wolbach. It goes east through Wolbach and continues east until it meets Nebraska Highway 14 in Fullerton. NE 22 and NE 14 go north out of Fullerton and separate. NE 22 then goes east on an alignment which parallels the Loup River on its north side. It passes through Genoa and Monroe before ending at U.S. Highway 81 near Columbus.

== Major intersections ==
County	Location	mi	km	Destinations	Notes
Valley		0.00	0.00	N-70 – Arcadia, Ord	Western terminus
Valley		11.89	19.14	N-11 north – North Loup, Ord	Northern end of N-11 concurrency
Greeley		13.92	22.40	N-11 south – Cotesfield, Elba	Southern end of N-11 concurrency
Greeley		23.98	38.59	US 281 north – Greeley, O'Neill	Northern end of US 281 concurrency
Greeley		31.80	51.18	US 281 south – St. Paul, Grand Island	Southern end of US 281 concurrency
Nance	Fullerton	56.88	91.54	N-14 south (South Johnson Street) – Central City, Aurora	Southern end of N-14 concurrency
Nance		58.52	94.18	N-14 north – Albion, Petersburg	Northern end of N-14 concurrency
Nance		71.81	115.57	N-39 south – Silver Creek	Southern end of N-39 concurrency
Nance	Genoa	73.02	117.51	N-39 north (Willard Avenue) – St. Edward	Northern end of N-39 concurrency
Nance		74.95	120.62	L-63A west	
Platte		89.25	143.63	US 81 – Columbus, Norfolk	Eastern terminus
1.000 mi = 1.609 km; 1.000 km = 0.621 mi: Concurrency terminus

== See also ==
- List of state highways in Nebraska
