= Nebraska Highway 52 =

State highway in Nebraska, U.S.

State Highway 52

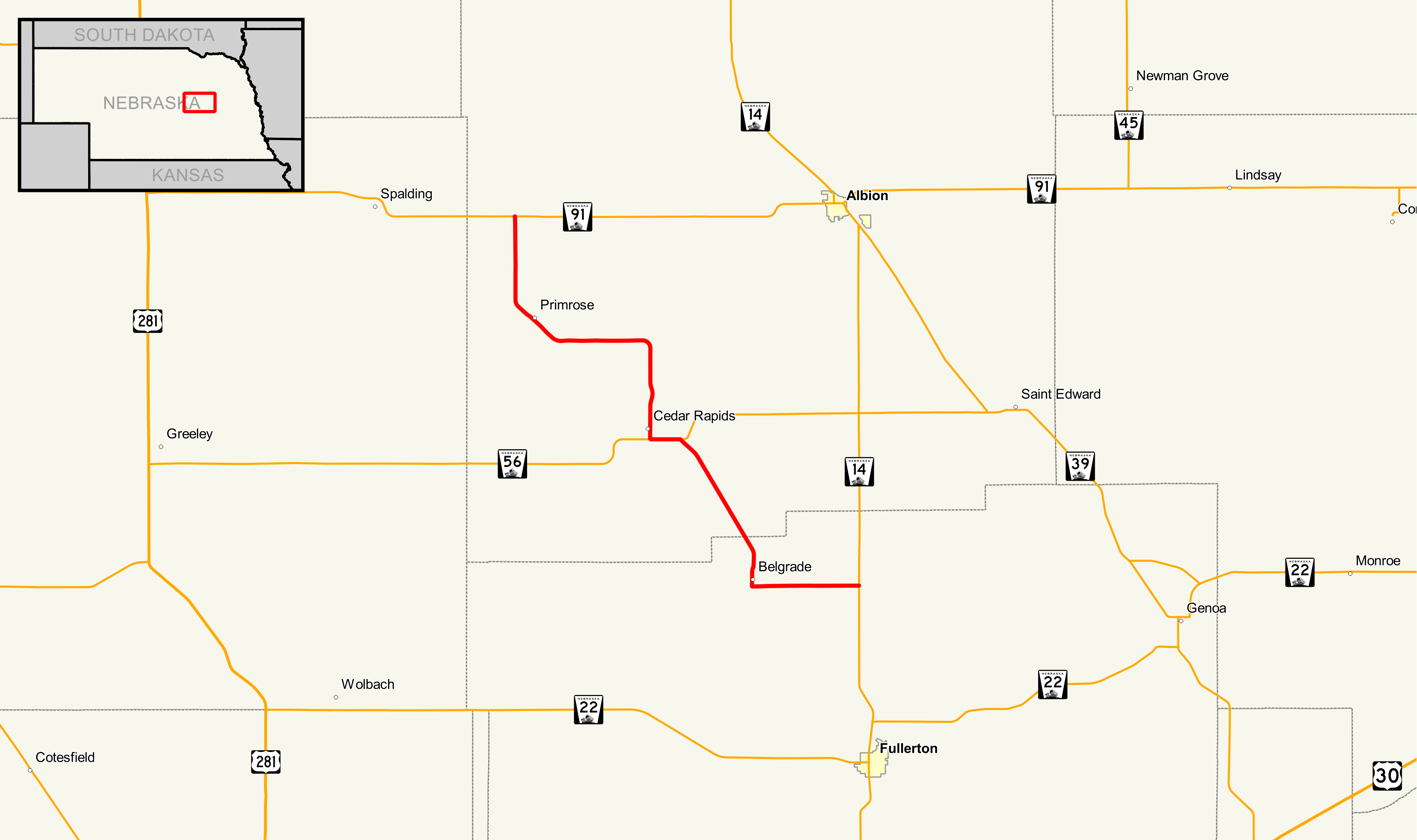
- Nebraska Highway 52 highlighted in red

Route information
- Maintained by NDOT
- Length: 25.89 mi (41.67 km)
- Existed: 1926–present

Major junctions
- South end: N-14 north of Fullerton
- N-56 in Cedar Rapids
- North end: N-91 east of Spalding

Location
- Country: United States
- State: Nebraska
- Counties: Nance, Boone

Highway system
- Nebraska State Highway System; Interstate; US; State; Link; Spur; State Spurs; Recreation
← N-51	→ N-53

Nebraska Highway 52 is a highway in central Nebraska. It is 25.89 miles (41.67 km) in length and runs at a southeast-to-northwest angle, though signed north–south. The south terminus is at an intersection with Nebraska Highway 14 north of Fullerton. The northern terminus is located north of Primrose at an intersection with Nebraska Highway 91.

== Route description ==
Nebraska Highway 52 begins north of Fullerton at Nebraska Highway 14. It goes west through farmland and turns north to pass through Belgrade. Shortly after Belgrade, the highway turns northwest and turns west when it meets Nebraska Highway 56. They overlap into Cedar Rapids, where Highway 52 turns north again. It goes north, then west, then turns northwest to go through Primrose. After passing through Primrose, the highway turns north and ends when it meets Nebraska Highway 91.

== Major intersections ==
County	Location	mi	km	Destinations	Notes
Nance		0.00	0.00	N-14	Southern terminus
Boone	Cedar Rapids	11.20	18.02	N-56 east	South end of N-56 overlap
Boone	Cedar Rapids	12.46	20.05	N-56 west	North end of N-56 overlap
Boone		25.89	41.67	N-91	Northern terminus
1.000 mi = 1.609 km; 1.000 km = 0.621 mi: Concurrency terminus
