= St. Edward High School =

St. Edward High School is a name shared by several high schools:

- St. Edward Central Catholic High School (Elgin, Illinois)
- St. Edward High School (Nebraska), St. Edward, Nebraska
- St. Edward High School (Lakewood, Ohio)
- St. Edward's High School (Austin, Texas)
