= Nebraska Highway 96 =

State highway in Nebraska, U.S.

State Highway 96

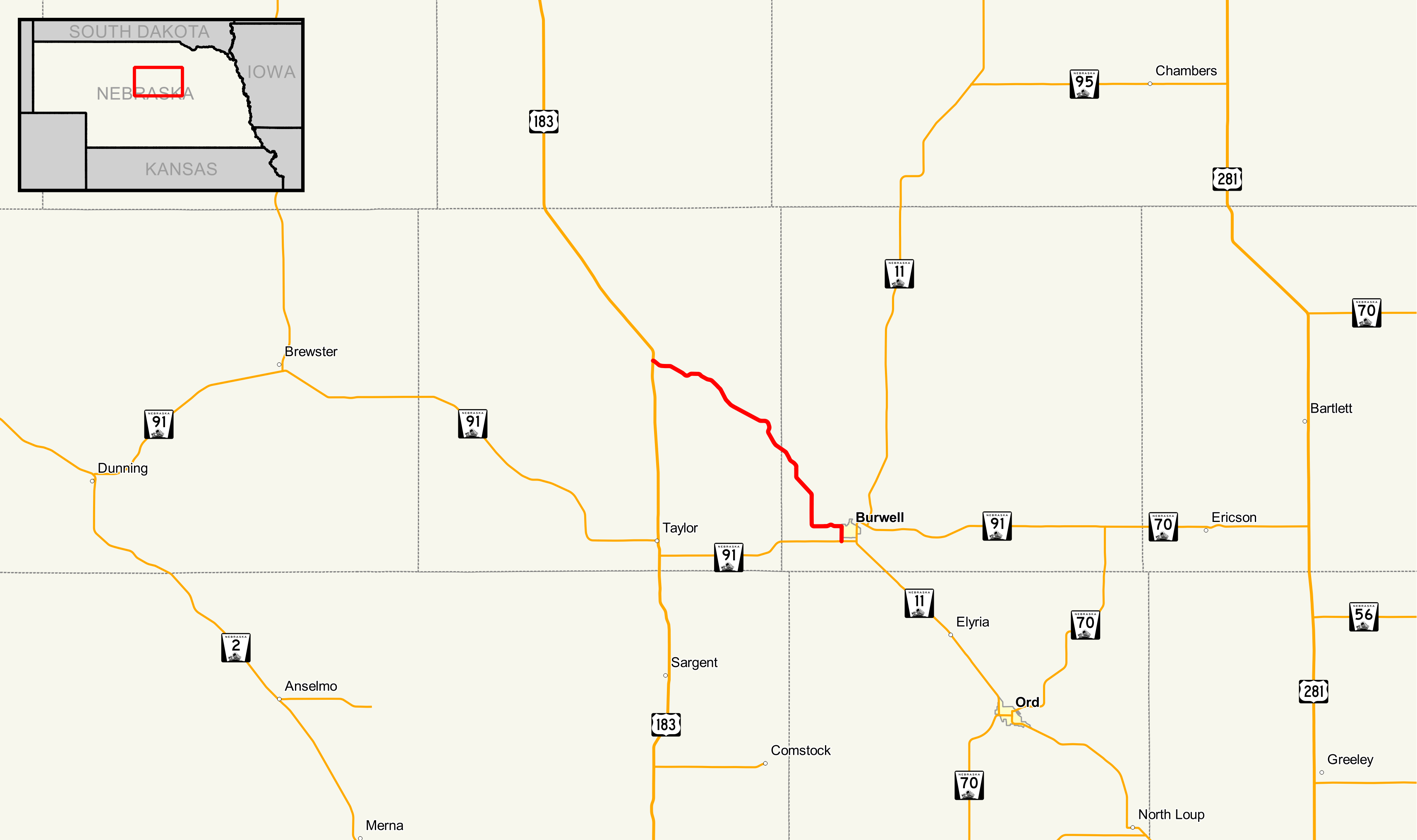
- Nebraska Highway 96 highlighted in red

Route information
- Maintained by NDOT
- Length: 20.05 mi (32.27 km)
- Existed: 1997–present

Major junctions
- West end: US 183 north of Taylor
- East end: N-91 south of Burwell

Location
- Country: United States
- State: Nebraska
- Counties: Loup, Garfield

Highway system
- Nebraska State Highway System; Interstate; US; State; Link; Spur; State Spurs; Recreation
← N-95	→ N-97

Nebraska Highway 96 is a highway in central Nebraska. It has a western terminus at an intersection with U.S. Highway 183 north of Taylor. Its eastern terminus is at Nebraska Highway 91 just to the south of Burwell.

== Route description ==
Nebraska Highway 96 begins north of Taylor at US 183. It heads in a southeasterly direction, passing by the Calamus Lake/Reservoir to the south. It then heads southward and to the east heading into Burwell. The highway turns to the south in Burwell, before terminating at NE 91 just outside Burwell's southern limits.

== Major intersections ==
County	Location	mi	km	Destinations	Notes
Loup		0.00	0.00	US 183	Western terminus
Garfield	Burwell	20.05	32.27	N-91	Eastern terminus
1.000 mi = 1.609 km; 1.000 km = 0.621 mi
