= Boone, Nebraska =

Unincorporated community in Nebraska, United States

- Unincorporated Community
- Location within Nebraska Location within the United States
- Coordinates: 41.6°N 97.9°W
- Country: United States
- State: Nebraska
- County: Boone

Boone is an unincorporated community in Boone County, Nebraska, United States.

== History ==
Boone took its name from Boone County, which was named for pioneer Daniel Boone. A post office was established at Boone in 1872, and remained in operation until 1994.
