= Nebraska Highway 70 =

State highway in Nebraska, U.S.

State Highway 70

Route information
- Maintained by NDOT
- Length: 115.78 mi (186.33 km)
- Existed: 1960–present

Major junctions
- West end: N-2 / N-92 east of Broken Bow
- US 183 north of Westerville; N-58 east of Arcadia; N-11 in Ord; N-91 west of Ericson; US 281 east of Ericson
- East end: N-14 in Elgin

Location
- Country: United States
- State: Nebraska
- Counties: Custer, Valley, Garfield, Wheeler, Antelope

Highway system
- Nebraska State Highway System; Interstate; US; State; Link; Spur; State Spurs; Recreation
← N-69	→ N-71

Nebraska Highway 70 is a highway in central Nebraska. Its western terminus is at an intersection with Nebraska Highway 2 and Nebraska Highway 92 east of Broken Bow. Its eastern terminus is at Nebraska Highway 14 in Elgin.

== Route description ==
Nebraska Highway 70 begins at an intersection with NE 2 and NE 92 just east of Broken Bow. It heads in an eastward direction into farmland from here, where it intersects with US 183 north of Westerville. It runs concurrently with US 183 for about a mile before splitting off to the east again, passing through Westerville. The highway runs to the east and northeast, passing through Arcadia. East of Arcadia, it meets NE 58 and heads northward, passing by NE 22 as well. In Ord, it intersects NE 11 and runs concurrently to the east with it for just about a mile. NE 70 exits Ord and heads in a northeasterly direction, where it will meet with NE 91 west of Ericson. NE 70 and NE 91 run concurrently through Ericson before meeting with US 281 to the east. NE 70 runs concurrently northward with US 281 for about 14 miles (23 km), passing through Bartlett, before splitting off to the east. Further east, the highway enters Elgin where it terminates at an intersection with NE 14.

== Major intersections ==
County	Location	mi	km	Destinations	Notes
Custer	Broken Bow	0.00	0.00	N-2 / N-92 (South E Street)	
Custer	Westerville	12.09	19.46	US 183 north	Western end of US 183 overlap
Custer	Westerville	13.10	21.08	US 183 south	Eastern end of US 183 overlap
Valley		33.24	53.49	N-58 south	
Valley		37.69	60.66	N-22 east	
Valley	Ord	47.14	75.86	N-11 north	Western end of N-11 overlap
Valley	Ord	48.00	77.25	N-11 south (S. 14th Street)	Eastern end of N-11 overlap
Garfield		64.29	103.46	N-91 west	Western end of N-91 overlap
Wheeler	Ericson	77.88	125.34	US 281 south / N-91 east	Eastern end of N-91 overlap, western end of US 281 overlap
Wheeler		91.89	147.88	US 281 north	Eastern end of US 281 overlap
Antelope	Elgin	115.78	186.33	N-14 (North 2nd Street)	
1.000 mi = 1.609 km; 1.000 km = 0.621 mi: Concurrency terminus
