= Nebraska Highway 97 =

State highway in Nebraska, U.S.

State Highway 97

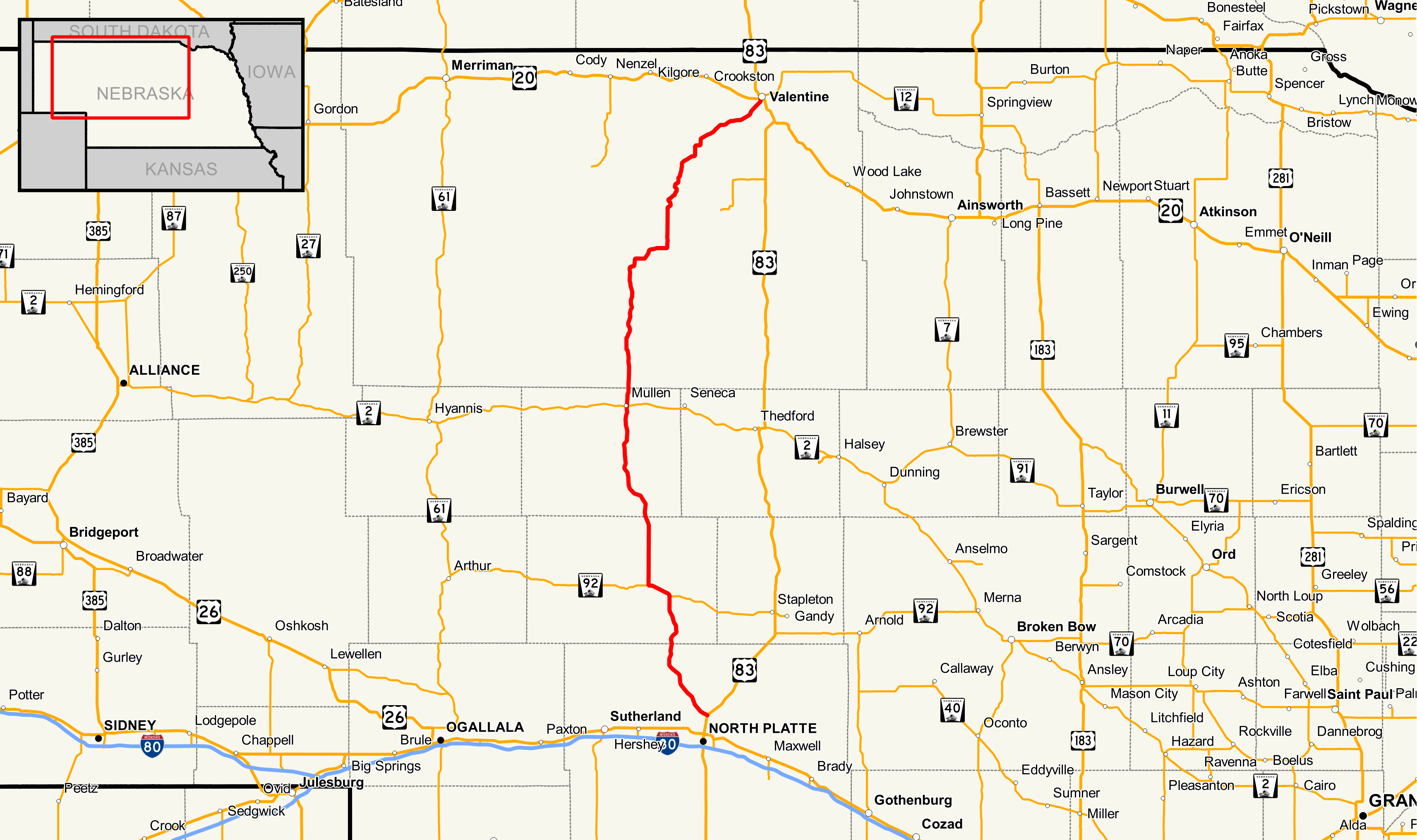
- Nebraska Highway 97 highlighted in red

Route information
- Maintained by NDOT
- Length: 140.78 mi (226.56 km)
- Existed: 1936–present

Major junctions
- South end: US 83 north of North Platte
- N-92 east of Tryon; N-2 in Mullen
- North end: US 20 in Valentine

Location
- Country: United States
- State: Nebraska
- Counties: Lincoln, McPherson, Hooker, Cherry

Highway system
- Nebraska State Highway System; Interstate; US; State; Link; Spur; State Spurs; Recreation
← N-96	→ N-98

Nebraska Highway 97 is a highway in western Nebraska. It has a southern terminus north of North Platte at an intersection with U.S. Highway 83. The northern terminus is at U.S. Highway 20 in Valentine.

== Route description ==
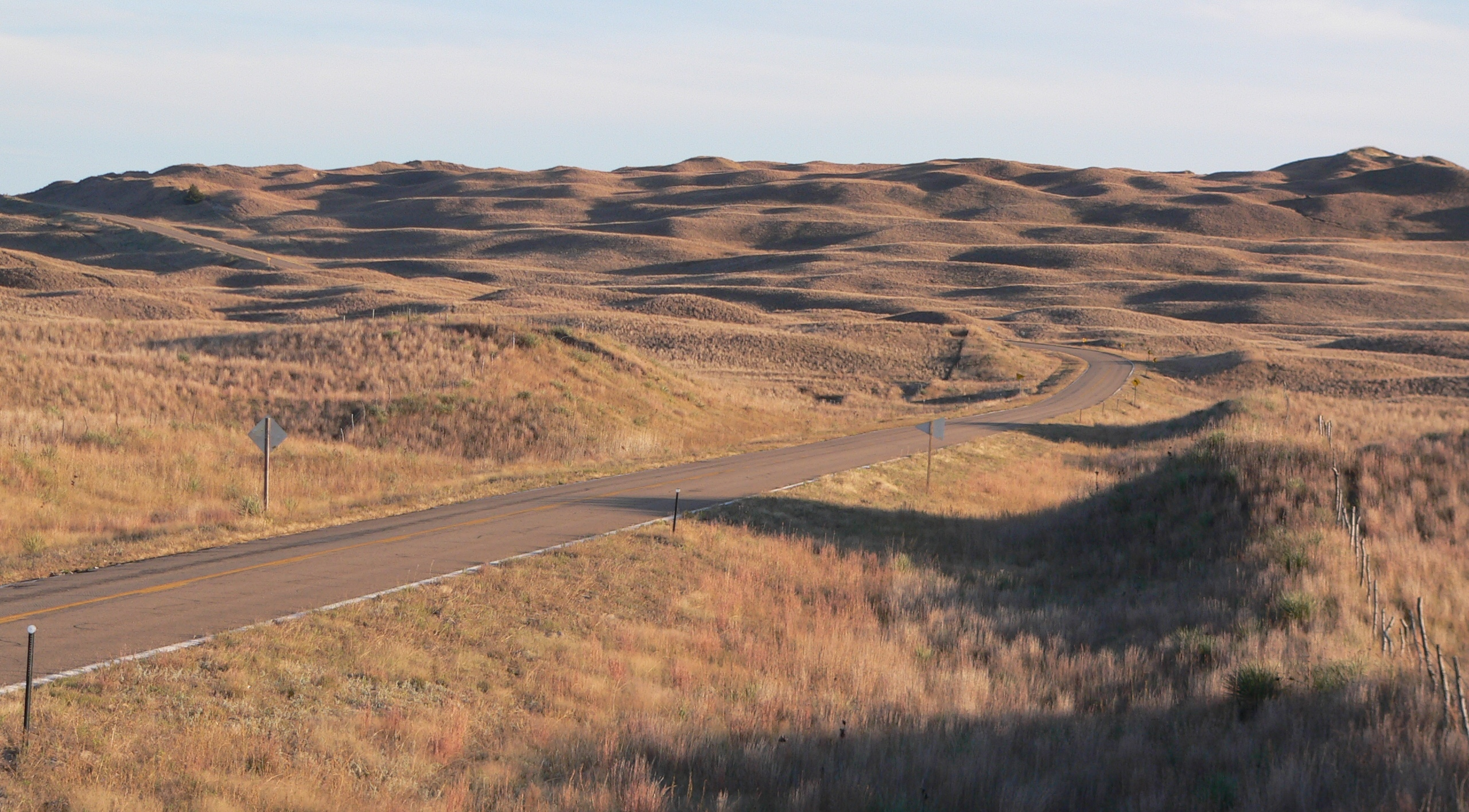
N-97 in the Sand Hills of Hooker County, October 2010

Nebraska Highway 97 begins to the north of North Platte branching off US 83. It heads to the northwest through prairies where it meets NE 92 east of Tryon. The highway runs concurrently with NE 92 to the west through Tryon, before splitting off and continuing northward. In Mullen, the highway intersects NE 2. It continues heading northward and to the northeast, passing the Merritt Reservoir along the way. NE 97 also passes Nebraska Spur 16F just north of the reservoir before continuing to the northeast. When the highway reaches Valentine, it terminates at US 20.

== Major intersections ==
County	Location	mi	km	Destinations	Notes
Lincoln	North Platte	0.00	0.00	US 83	
McPherson		26.24	42.23	N-92 east	Southern end of N-92 concurrency
McPherson	Tryon	30.71	49.42	N-92 west	Northern end of N-92 concurrency
Hooker	Mullen	66.61	107.20	N-2 (1st Street)	
Cherry	Valentine	140.78	226.56	US 20 (West C Street)	
1.000 mi = 1.609 km; 1.000 km = 0.621 mi: Concurrency terminus
