= Akron, Nebraska =

Unincorporated community in Nebraska, U.S.

Coordinates: 41°44′29″N 98°14′32″W

Akron is an unincorporated community in Boone County, Nebraska, United States.

== History ==
The community's name most likely is a transfer from Akron, Ohio. A post office was established at Akron in 1881, and remained in operation until it was discontinued in 1905.
