= List of Nebraska locations by per capita income =

As of 2000, Nebraska was the thirty-third richest state in the United States of America, with a per capita income of $19,613. By 2004, its personal per capita income was $32,276.

== Nebraska counties by per capita income ==
Note: Data are from the 2010 United States Census Data and the 2006-2010 American Community Survey 5-Year Estimates.

Rank	County	Per capita income	Median household income	Median family income	Population	Number of households
1	Thomas	$31,499	$48,250	$60,278	647	291
2	Sarpy	$29,212	$68,280	$79,350	158,840	58,102
3	Douglas	$28,092	$51,878	$67,666	517,110	202,411
4	Washington	$27,884	$61,940	$77,628	20,234	7,761
5	Cass	$27,584	$62,039	$72,273	25,241	9,698
	United States	$27,334	$51,914	$62,982	308,745,538	116,716,292
6	Kearney	$27,227	$54,518	$62,718	6,489	2,681
7	Cheyenne	$26,983	$49,493	$63,788	9,998	4,298
8	Saunders	$26,898	$57,699	$67,549	20,780	8,040
9	Seward	$26,386	$55,877	$71,895	16,750	6,266
10	Lancaster	$25,949	$50,849	$66,597	285,407	113,373
11	Sioux	$25,824	$42,386	$52,750	1,311	577
12	York	$25,412	$47,689	$59,091	13,665	5,564
13	Lincoln	$25,319	$45,181	$60,815	36,288	15,025
14	Keith	$25,315	$42,898	$54,350	8,368	3,753
	Nebraska	$25,229	$49,342	$61,888	1,826,341	721,130
15	Harlan	$25,050	$44,656	$53,073	3,423	1,519
16	Dundy	$24,701	$37,031	$53,266	2,008	897
17	Phelps	$23,951	$45,221	$61,413	9,188	3,779
18	Rock	$23,871	$39,159	$46,806	1,526	685
19	Polk	$23,831	$48,444	$56,306	5,406	2,212
20	Otoe	$23,773	$47,493	$59,291	15,740	6,362
21	Deuel	$23,758	$37,148	$49,375	1,941	867
22	Perkins	$23,542	$47,000	$58,750	2,970	1,239
23	Box Butte	$23,434	$44,404	$53,400	11,308	4,738
24	Platte	$23,358	$49,523	$59,691	32,237	12,658
25	Burt	$23,302	$43,817	$54,770	6,858	2,906
26	Hamilton	$23,240	$50,702	$57,397	9,124	3,563
27	Gosper	$23,132	$41,442	$52,292	2,044	849
28	Adams	$23,084	$44,443	$57,281	31,364	12,466
29	Stanton	$23,018	$47,713	$57,227	6,129	2,387
30	Boone	$22,790	$40,703	$51,981	5,505	2,336
31	Cuming	$22,783	$44,278	$55,583	9,139	3,756
32	Chase	$22,730	$38,314	$49,152	3,966	1,681
33	Buffalo	$22,616	$47,120	$60,646	46,102	18,037
34	Cherry	$22,601	$43,431	$51,534	5,713	2,530
35	Hall	$22,552	$46,138	$54,447	58,607	22,196
36	Holt	$22,498	$43,452	$54,899	10,435	4,447
37	Butler	$22,494	$44,595	$58,438	8,395	3,391
38	Frontier	$22,374	$42,009	$53,494	2,756	1,168
39	Howard	$22,325	$45,453	$56,406	6,274	2,625
40	Logan	$22,320	$45,192	$47,344	763	325
41	Kimball	$22,263	$42,010	$51,732	3,821	1,673
42	Madison	$22,157	$44,089	$57,819	34,876	13,939
43	Nemaha	$22,151	$42,534	$55,385	7,248	2,952
44	Dodge	$22,049	$42,849	$53,353	36,691	14,990
45	Banner	$22,042	$34,063	$52,604	690	293
46	Fillmore	$21,990	$43,167	$54,365	5,890	2,483
47	Hayes	$21,977	$45,595	$50,000	967	414
48	Jefferson	$21,976	$42,665	$54,017	7,547	3,348
49	Pawnee	$21,865	$41,969	$49,564	2,773	1,230
50	Merrick	$21,819	$46,116	$52,486	7,845	3,151
51	Custer	$21,685	$42,364	$50,110	10,939	4,714
52	Thayer	$21,648	$39,159	$51,471	5,228	2,296
53	Furnas	$21,644	$37,938	$49,187	4,959	2,185
54	Gage	$21,619	$43,311	$53,983	22,311	9,422
55	Nance	$21,457	$41,610	$52,083	3,735	1,525
56	Pierce	$21,419	$48,318	$58,333	7,266	2,911
57	Morrill	$21,367	$37,717	$46,703	5,042	2,085
58	Red Willow	$21,246	$41,927	$54,817	11,055	4,663
59	Scotts Bluff	$21,212	$39,004	$51,779	36,970	14,928
60	Hooker	$21,197	$38,750	$50,658	736	326
61	Clay	$21,147	$42,909	$53,098	6,542	2,649
62	Valley	$21,058	$38,588	$49,417	4,260	1,922
63	Boyd	$21,003	$34,906	$41,326	2,099	942
64	McPherson	$21,000	$50,625	$60,000	539	211
65	Sherman	$20,900	$38,631	$48,065	3,152	1,392
66	Colfax	$20,872	$48,133	$55,169	10,515	3,618
67	Hitchcock	$20,853	$35,549	$40,417	2,908	1,301
68	Keya Paha	$20,691	$32,000	$40,156	824	381
69	Wheeler	$20,614	$37,222	$50,083	818	350
70	Cedar	$20,595	$40,497	$52,572	8,852	3,539
71	Blaine	$20,586	$39,000	$41,719	478	196
72	Grant	$20,518	$39,261	$45,341	614	277
73	Richardson	$20,516	$35,165	$50,250	8,363	3,718
74	Dixon	$20,478	$42,388	$48,517	6,000	2,370
75	Saline	$20,431	$45,469	$55,060	14,200	5,131
76	Antelope	$20,419	$37,058	$47,463	6,685	2,841
77	Nuckolls	$20,299	$31,761	$41,667	4,500	2,079
78	Sheridan	$20,066	$33,608	$42,545	5,469	2,380
79	Loup	$20,004	$34,219	$43,750	632	275
80	Knox	$19,894	$36,798	$49,957	8,701	3,647
81	Franklin	$19,764	$37,220	$47,604	3,225	1,406
82	Garden	$19,740	$32,962	$43,472	2,057	961
83	Arthur	$19,722	$43,250	$45,547	460	187
84	Wayne	$19,681	$45,000	$56,234	9,595	3,507
85	Dawson	$19,384	$41,830	$51,674	24,326	8,899
86	Garfield	$19,235	$38,709	$47,056	2,049	935
87	Greeley	$19,235	$41,181	$53,500	2,538	1,069
88	Dakota	$19,048	$43,729	$52,771	21,006	7,218
89	Webster	$18,906	$38,015	$45,871	3,812	1,604
90	Dawes	$18,573	$34,937	$50,313	9,182	3,684
91	Johnson	$17,606	$42,083	$53,578	5,217	1,847
92	Brown	$17,330	$28,038	$44,569	3,145	1,449
93	Thurston	$15,686	$39,048	$46,442	6,940	2,158
