= Primrose, Nebraska =

Village in Nebraska, US

- Village
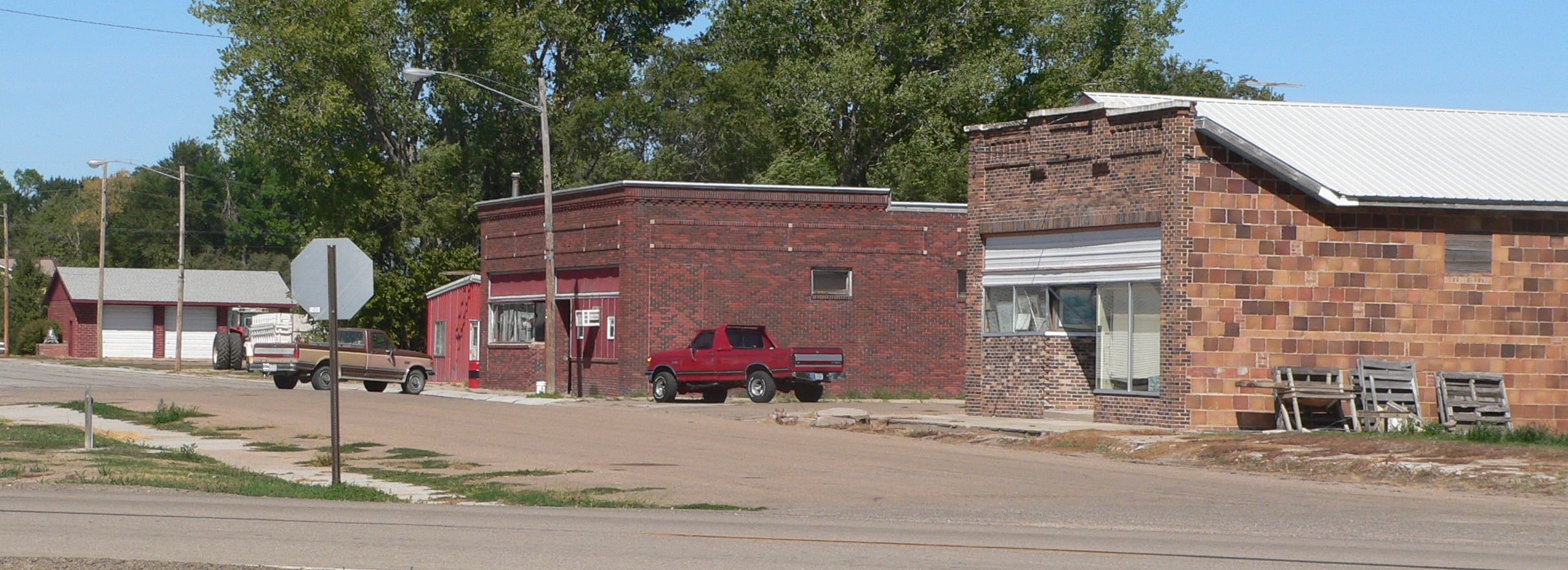
- Downtown Primrose: Commercial Street

- Location of Primrose, Nebraska
- Coordinates: 41°37′26″N 98°14′15″W
- Country: United States
- State: Nebraska
- County: Boone

Area
  - Total: 0.28 sq mi (0.72 km^{2})
  - Land: 0.28 sq mi (0.72 km^{2})
  - Water: 0 sq mi (0.00 km^{2})
- Elevation: 1,824 ft (556 m)

Population (2020)
  - Total: 55
  - Density: 198.3/sq mi (76.57/km^{2})
- Time zone: UTC-6 (Central (CST))
  - Summer (DST): UTC-5 (CDT)
- ZIP code: 68655
- Area code: 308
- FIPS code: 31-40360
- GNIS feature ID: 2399024

Primrose is a village in Boone County, Nebraska, United States. The population was 55 at the 2020 census.

== History ==
Primrose was platted in 1902 when the railroad was extended to that point, although a small Irish settlement had existed there for some time. An earlier variant name was "Dublin". The present name is after David Primrose, the original owner of the town site.

== Geography ==
According to the United States Census Bureau, the village has a total area of 0.28 square miles (0.73 km^{2}), all land.

== Demographics ==
Historical population
Census	Pop.	Note	%±
1910	158		—
1920	155		−1.9%
1930	210		35.5%
1940	176		−16.2%
1950	154		−12.5%
1960	117		−24.0%
1970	88		−24.8%
1980	102		15.9%
1990	69		−32.4%
2000	69		0.0%
2010	61		−11.6%
2020	55		−9.8%
U.S. Decennial Census

=== 2010 census ===
As of the census of 2010, there were 61 people, 29 households, and 17 families residing in the village. The population density was 217.9 inhabitants per square mile (84.1/km^{2}). There were 39 housing units at an average density of 139.3 per square mile (53.8/km^{2}). The racial makeup of the village was 96.7% White and 3.3% from two or more races.

There were 29 households, of which 24.1% had children under the age of 18 living with them, 48.3% were married couples living together, 3.4% had a female householder with no husband present, 6.9% had a male householder with no wife present, and 41.4% were non-families. 41.4% of all households were made up of individuals, and 17.2% had someone living alone who was 65 years of age or older. The average household size was 2.10 and the average family size was 2.82.

The median age in the village was 39.6 years. 24.6% of residents were under the age of 18; 3.3% were between the ages of 18 and 24; 27.9% were from 25 to 44; 27.9% were from 45 to 64; and 16.4% were 65 years of age or older. The gender makeup of the village was 57.4% male and 42.6% female.

=== 2000 census ===
As of the census of 2000, there were 69 people, 31 households, and 19 families residing in the village. The population density was 248.0 people per square mile (95.8 people/km^{2}). There were 36 housing units at an average density of 129.4 per square mile (50.0/km^{2}). The racial makeup of the village was 97.10% White, and 2.90% from two or more races. Hispanic or Latino of any race were 1.45% of the population.

There were 31 households, out of which 25.8% had children under the age of 18 living with them, 48.4% were married couples living together, 6.5% had a female householder with no husband present, and 38.7% were non-families. 32.3% of all households were made up of individuals, and 22.6% had someone living alone who was 65 years of age or older. The average household size was 2.23 and the average family size was 2.79.

In the village, the population was spread out, with 20.3% under the age of 18, 7.2% from 18 to 24, 27.5% from 25 to 44, 15.9% from 45 to 64, and 29.0% who were 65 years of age or older. The median age was 40 years. For every 100 females, there were 72.5 males. For every 100 females age 18 and over, there were 89.7 males.

As of 2000 the median income for a household in the village was $28,750, and the median income for a family was $40,000. Males had a median income of $27,083 versus $18,438 for females. The per capita income for the village was $12,831. There were 12.5% of families and 14.9% of the population living below the poverty line, including no under eighteens and 33.3% of those over 64.
