= Boone County, Nebraska =

County in Nebraska, United States

- County
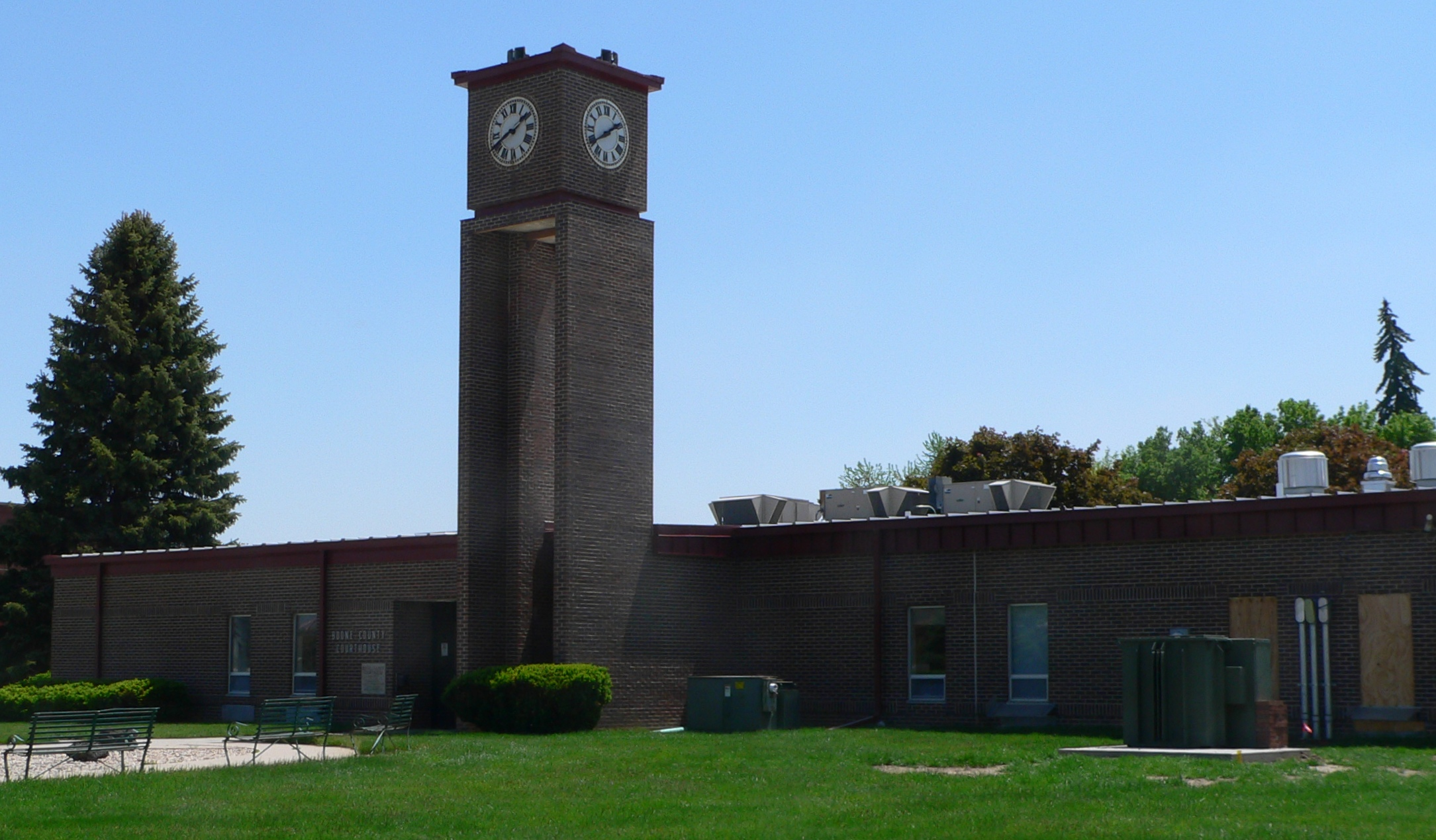
- The Boone County Courthouse in Albion

- Seal

- Location within the U.S. state of Nebraska
- Coordinates: 41.703934°N 98.070476°W
- Country: United States
- State: Nebraska
- Founded: March 1, 1871
- Named for: Daniel Boone
- Seat: Albion
- Largest city: Albion

Area
  - Total: 687.217 sq mi (1,779.88 km^{2})
  - Land: 686.530 sq mi (1,778.10 km^{2})
  - Water: 0.687 sq mi (1.78 km^{2}) 0.10%

Population (2020)
  - Total: 5,386
  - Estimate (2025): 5,355 ▼
  - Density: 7.845/sq mi (3.029/km^{2})
- Time zone: UTC−6 (Central)
  - Summer (DST): UTC−5 (CDT)
- Area code: 402 and 531
- Congressional district: 3rd
- Website: boonecountyne.gov
- • Nebraska county number 06 • Nebraska license plate prefix 23

Boone County is a county in the U.S. state of Nebraska. As of the 2020 census, the population was 5,386, and was estimated to be 5,355 in 2025. The county seat and the largest city is Albion.

In the Nebraska license plate system, Boone County was represented by the prefix "23" (as it had the 23rd-largest number of vehicles registered in the state when the license plate system was established in 1922).

== History ==
Boone County was created on March 1, 1871, and named in honor of frontiersman Daniel Boone. The settlement of Boone County began with the arrival of explorers and settlers in the late 1860s. One of the first white settlers was S.D. Avery, who in 1871 established a claim near what would become the town of Albion. The initial settlement was encouraged by the expansion of railroads and the availability of land under the Homestead Act of 1862.

The community of Albion was platted in 1872 and became the county seat after a contest with the town of Boone. This rivalry for the county seat was common in many frontier counties, reflecting the ambition and growth aspirations of the nascent communities. Agriculture quickly became the backbone of the local economy, with wheat, corn, and later oats being predominant.

The development of Boone County was relatively rapid thanks to its fertile soil and the dedication of its settlers. The railroad, reaching Albion in the early 1880s, played a crucial role in the county's growth, providing access to markets for agricultural products and bringing in more settlers. The county's population and infrastructure expanded, with schools, churches, and businesses being established to support the burgeoning agricultural community.

== Geography ==
According to the United States Census Bureau, the county has a total area of 687.217 square miles (1,779.88 km^{2}), of which 686.530 square miles (1,778.10 km^{2}) is land and 0.687 square miles (1.78 km^{2}) (0.10%) is water. It is the 41st-largest county in Nebraska by total area.

=== Major highways ===
- Nebraska Highway 14
- Nebraska Highway 32
- Nebraska Highway 39
- Nebraska Highway 45
- Nebraska Highway 52
- Nebraska Highway 56
- Nebraska Highway 91

=== Adjacent counties ===
- Madison County – northeast
- Platte County – southeast
- Nance County – south
- Greeley County – southwest
- Wheeler County – northwest
- Antelope County – north

== Demographics ==
Historical population
Census	Pop.	Note	%±
1880	4,170		—
1890	8,683		108.2%
1900	11,689		34.6%
1910	13,145		12.5%
1920	14,146		7.6%
1930	14,738		4.2%
1940	12,127		−17.7%
1950	10,721		−11.6%
1960	9,134		−14.8%
1970	8,190		−10.3%
1980	7,391		−9.8%
1990	6,667		−9.8%
2000	6,259		−6.1%
2010	5,505		−12.0%
2020	5,379		−2.3%
2025 (est.)	5,355	▼	−0.4%
U.S. Decennial Census; 1790–1960 1900–1990; 1990–2000 2010–2020

=== 2020 census ===
As of the 2020 census, the county had a population of 5,379. The median age was 44.7 years. 23.9% of residents were under the age of 18 and 23.6% of residents were 65 years of age or older. For every 100 females there were 100.0 males, and for every 100 females age 18 and over there were 101.0 males age 18 and over.

The racial makeup of the county was 94.6% White, 0.4% Black or African American, 0.3% American Indian and Alaska Native, 0.1% Asian, 0.0% Native Hawaiian and Pacific Islander, 1.4% from some other race, and 3.1% from two or more races. Hispanic or Latino residents of any race comprised 3.4% of the population.

0.0% of residents lived in urban areas, while 100.0% lived in rural areas.

There were 2,253 households in the county, of which 26.6% had children under the age of 18 living with them and 20.4% had a female householder with no spouse or partner present. About 30.7% of all households were made up of individuals and 15.7% had someone living alone who was 65 years of age or older.

There were 2,554 housing units, of which 11.8% were vacant. Among occupied housing units, 75.6% were owner-occupied and 24.4% were renter-occupied. The homeowner vacancy rate was 2.0% and the rental vacancy rate was 7.7%.

=== 2000 census ===
As of the 2000 census, there were 6,259 people, 2,454 households, and 1,700 families in the county. The population density was 9 people per square mile (3.5 people/km^{2}). There were 2,733 housing units at an average density of 4 units per square mile (1.5/km^{2}). The racial makeup of the county was 99.25% White, 0.05% Black or African American, 0.05% Native American, 0.03% Asian, 0.03% Pacific Islander, 0.30% from other races, and 0.29% from two or more races. 0.89% of the population were Hispanic or Latino of any race. 54.6% were of German, 8.2% Irish, 5.9% Polish, 5.3% Norwegian and 5.1% Swedish ancestry.

There were 2,454 households, out of which 33.90% had children under the age of 18 living with them, 60.80% were married couples living together, 5.50% had a female householder with no husband present, and 30.70% were non-families. 29.10% of all households were made up of individuals, and 16.50% had someone living alone who was 65 years of age or older. The average household size was 2.50 and the average family size was 3.11.

29.10% of the population is under the age of 18, 5.00% from 18 to 24, 24.20% from 25 to 44, 21.40% from 45 to 64, and 20.40% who were 65 years of age or older. The median age was 40 years. For every 100 females there were 99.10 males. For every 100 females age 18 and over, there were 96.40 males.

The median income for a household in the county was $31,444, and the median income for a family was $38,226. Males had a median income of $26,779 versus $18,438 for females. The per capita income for the county was $15,831. About 8.30% of families and 10.40% of the population were below the poverty line, including 11.70% of those under age 18 and 11.60% of those age 65 or over.

== Communities ==
=== Cities ===
- Albion (county seat)
- St. Edward

=== Villages ===
- Cedar Rapids
- Petersburg
- Primrose

=== Census-designated places ===
- Loretto
- Raeville

=== Unincorporated communities ===
- Akron
- Boone
- Closter

== Politics ==
Boone County voters have been strongly Republican for decades. In only one national election since 1936 has the county selected the Democratic Party candidate.

Political Party	Number of registered voters (March 1, 2026)	Percent
Republican	2,644	73.63%
Democratic	506	14.09%
Independent	404	11.25%
Libertarian	27	0.75%
Legal Marijuana Now	10	0.28%
Total	3,591	100.00%

United States presidential election results for Boone County, Nebraska
Year	Republican		Democratic		Third party(ies)	
Year	No.	%	No.	%	No.	%
1900	1,524	52.28%	1,336	45.83%	55	1.89%
1904	1,823	63.72%	471	16.46%	567	19.82%
1908	1,580	49.14%	1,583	49.24%	52	1.62%
1912	570	19.30%	1,360	46.05%	1,023	34.64%
1916	1,225	37.03%	2,005	60.61%	78	2.36%
1920	3,108	65.97%	1,461	31.01%	142	3.01%
1924	2,013	36.36%	1,782	32.18%	1,742	31.46%
1928	3,816	62.57%	2,260	37.06%	23	0.38%
1932	1,862	29.60%	4,360	69.31%	69	1.10%
1936	2,728	45.28%	3,095	51.37%	202	3.35%
1940	3,334	62.34%	2,014	37.66%	0	0.00%
1944	2,865	63.25%	1,665	36.75%	0	0.00%
1948	2,235	55.69%	1,778	44.31%	0	0.00%
1952	3,453	72.91%	1,283	27.09%	0	0.00%
1956	3,021	70.29%	1,277	29.71%	0	0.00%
1960	2,809	64.49%	1,547	35.51%	0	0.00%
1964	1,893	49.84%	1,905	50.16%	0	0.00%
1968	2,179	64.01%	934	27.44%	291	8.55%
1972	2,406	73.15%	883	26.85%	0	0.00%
1976	2,035	59.21%	1,329	38.67%	73	2.12%
1980	2,598	72.11%	769	21.34%	236	6.55%
1984	2,508	78.01%	690	21.46%	17	0.53%
1988	2,160	68.57%	976	30.98%	14	0.44%
1992	1,589	50.21%	604	19.08%	972	30.71%
1996	1,695	57.63%	806	27.41%	440	14.96%
2000	2,196	76.73%	575	20.09%	91	3.18%
2004	2,309	79.76%	546	18.86%	40	1.38%
2008	2,042	72.00%	742	26.16%	52	1.83%
2012	2,138	76.19%	615	21.92%	53	1.89%
2016	2,299	79.14%	414	14.25%	192	6.61%
2020	2,653	82.24%	499	15.47%	74	2.29%
2024	2,499	82.20%	496	16.32%	45	1.48%

== See also ==
- National Register of Historic Places listings in Boone County, Nebraska
- Olson Nature Preserve
