= Cedar Rapids, Nebraska =

Village in Nebraska, US

- Village
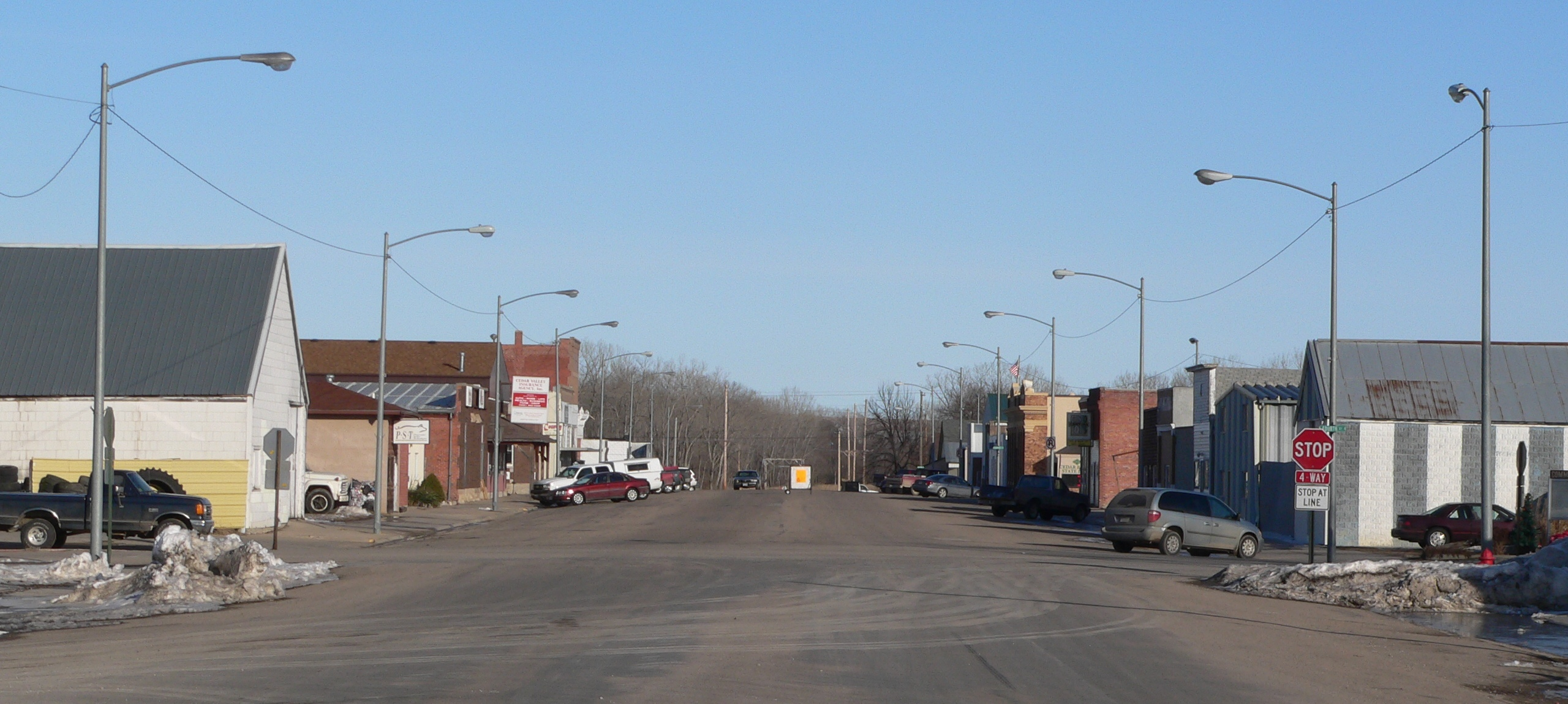
- Downtown Cedar Rapids: Main Street looking east from 4th Street

- Location of Cedar Rapids, Nebraska
- Coordinates: 41°33′32″N 98°08′57″W
- Country: United States
- State: Nebraska
- County: Boone

Area
  - Total: 0.36 sq mi (0.93 km^{2})
  - Land: 0.36 sq mi (0.93 km^{2})
  - Water: 0 sq mi (0.00 km^{2})
- Elevation: 1,778 ft (542 m)

Population (2020)
  - Total: 382
  - Density: 1,065.8/sq mi (411.51/km^{2})
- Time zone: UTC-6 (Central (CST))
  - Summer (DST): UTC-5 (CDT)
- ZIP codes: 68627
- Area code: 308
- FIPS code: 31-08220
- GNIS feature ID: 2397583
- Website: cedarrapidsne.com

Cedar Rapids is a village in Boone County, Nebraska, United States. The population was 382 at the 2020 census.

== History ==
Cedar Rapids got its start when the Burlington Railroad was extended to that point. The town site was platted in 1879. It was named from the whitewater on the Cedar River.

== Geography ==
According to the United States Census Bureau, the village has a total area of 0.36 square miles (0.93 km^{2}), all land.

== Demographics ==
Historical population
Census	Pop.	Note	%±
1890	484		—
1900	559		15.5%
1910	576		3.0%
1920	766		33.0%
1930	743		−3.0%
1940	695		−6.5%
1950	541		−22.2%
1960	512		−5.4%
1970	449		−12.3%
1980	447		−0.4%
1990	396		−11.4%
2000	407		2.8%
2010	382		−6.1%
2020	382		0.0%
U.S. Decennial Census

=== 2010 census ===
As of the census of 2010, there were 382 people, 171 households, and 103 families residing in the village. The population density was 1,061.1 inhabitants per square mile (409.7/km^{2}). There were 201 housing units at an average density of 558.3 per square mile (215.6/km^{2}). The racial makeup of the village was 97.9% White, 1.8% African American, and 0.3% from two or more races. Hispanic or Latino of any race were 0.5% of the population.

There were 171 households, of which 26.3% had children under the age of 18 living with them, 46.8% were married couples living together, 7.6% had a female householder with no husband present, 5.8% had a male householder with no wife present, and 39.8% were non-families. 38.0% of all households were made up of individuals, and 22.3% had someone living alone who was 65 years of age or older. The average household size was 2.23 and the average family size was 2.94.

The median age in the village was 43.1 years. 23% of residents were under the age of 18; 9.3% were between the ages of 18 and 24; 22% were from 25 to 44; 23.8% were from 45 to 64; and 22% were 65 years of age or older. The gender makeup of the village was 51.0% male and 49.0% female.

=== 2000 census ===
As of the census of 2000, there were 407 people, 179 households, and 107 families residing in the village. The population density was 1,136.5 inhabitants per square mile (438.8/km^{2}). There were 199 housing units at an average density of 555.7 per square mile (214.6/km^{2}). The racial makeup of the village was 99.75% White, 0.25% from other races. Hispanic or Latino of any race were 0.98% of the population.

There were 179 households, out of which 27.4% had children under the age of 18 living with them, 51.4% were married couples living together, 5.6% had a female householder with no husband present, and 39.7% were non-families. 39.1% of all households were made up of individuals, and 24.0% had someone living alone who was 65 years of age or older. The average household size was 2.27 and the average family size was 3.06.

In the village, the population was spread out, with 28.0% under the age of 18, 4.7% from 18 to 24, 22.9% from 25 to 44, 21.4% from 45 to 64, and 23.1% who were 65 years of age or older. The median age was 41 years. For every 100 females, there were 113.1 males. For every 100 females age 18 and over, there were 98.0 males.

As of 2000, the median income for a household in the village was $28,333, and the median income for a family was $32,708. Males had a median income of $26,705 versus $18,750 for females. The per capita income for the village was $15,138. About 10.8% of families and 14.4% of the population were below the poverty line, including 19.0% of those under age 18 and 13.0% of those age 65 or over.

== Notable people ==
- Carol Moseke, Olympic discus thrower
- Kate Sullivan, Nebraska legislator
