= Taylor, Nebraska =

- Village
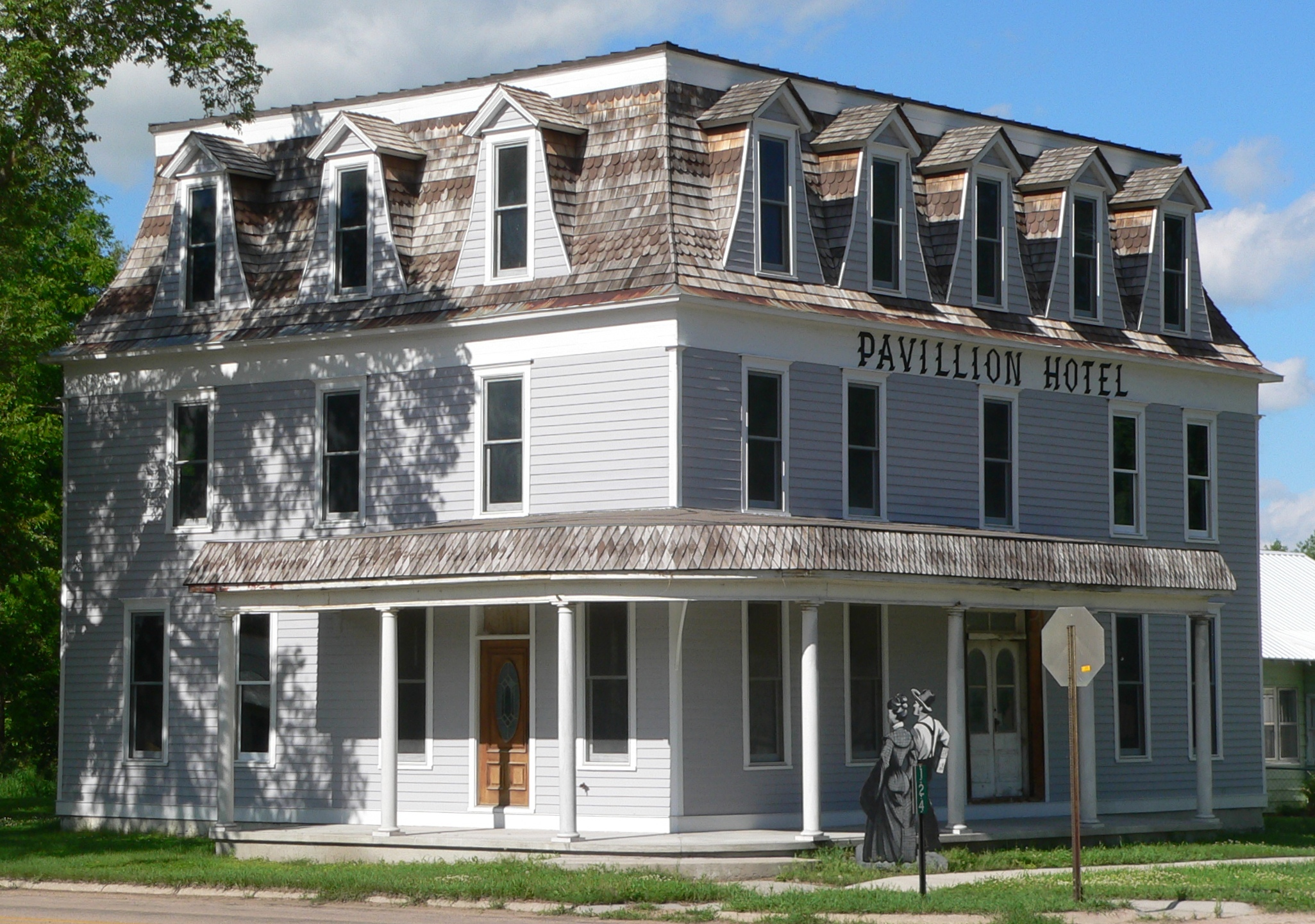
- The 1887 Pavillion Hotel in downtown Taylor is in the National Register of Historic Places.

- Location of Taylor, Nebraska
- Coordinates: 41°46′11″N 99°22′53″W
- Country: United States
- State: Nebraska
- County: Loup

Area
  - Total: 0.26 sq mi (0.68 km^{2})
  - Land: 0.26 sq mi (0.68 km^{2})
  - Water: 0 sq mi (0.00 km^{2})
- Elevation: 2,274 ft (693 m)

Population (2020)
  - Total: 141
  - Density: 540.2/sq mi (208.56/km^{2})
- Time zone: UTC-6 (Central (CST))
  - Summer (DST): UTC-5 (CDT)
- ZIP code: 68879
- Area code: 308
- FIPS code: 31-48445
- GNIS feature ID: 2399957
- Website: taylorne.com

Taylor is a village in and the county seat of Loup County, Nebraska, United States. As of the 2020 census, Taylor had a population of 141.

== History ==
Taylor was platted in 1883 and was named for Ed Taylor, a pioneer settler.

== Geography ==
According to the United States Census Bureau, the village has a total area of 0.26 square miles (0.67 km^{2}), all land.

=== Climate ===
Climate data for Taylor, Nebraska (1991–2020)
Month	Jan	Feb	Mar	Apr	May	Jun	Jul	Aug	Sep	Oct	Nov	Dec	Year
Mean daily maximum °F (°C)	36.0 (2.2)	39.0 (3.9)	49.0 (9.4)	59.1 (15.1)	69.6 (20.9)	80.2 (26.8)	85.7 (29.8)	84.2 (29.0)	76.5 (24.7)	63.5 (17.5)	48.8 (9.3)	37.9 (3.3)	60.8 (16.0)
Daily mean °F (°C)	22.6 (−5.2)	25.9 (−3.4)	35.7 (2.1)	45.7 (7.6)	56.8 (13.8)	67.7 (19.8)	73.1 (22.8)	71.0 (21.7)	62.5 (16.9)	48.6 (9.2)	34.9 (1.6)	25.2 (−3.8)	47.5 (8.6)
Mean daily minimum °F (°C)	9.2 (−12.7)	12.8 (−10.7)	22.3 (−5.4)	32.2 (0.1)	44.0 (6.7)	55.2 (12.9)	60.4 (15.8)	57.7 (14.3)	48.5 (9.2)	33.6 (0.9)	21.0 (−6.1)	12.4 (−10.9)	34.1 (1.2)
Average precipitation inches (mm)	0.57 (14)	0.85 (22)	1.53 (39)	3.28 (83)	4.06 (103)	4.10 (104)	3.07 (78)	3.19 (81)	2.18 (55)	2.25 (57)	1.03 (26)	0.72 (18)	26.83 (680)
Average snowfall inches (cm)	5.8 (15)	7.0 (18)	4.4 (11)	3.3 (8.4)	0.0 (0.0)	0.0 (0.0)	0.0 (0.0)	0.0 (0.0)	0.0 (0.0)	1.1 (2.8)	3.7 (9.4)	4.9 (12)	30.2 (76.6)
Source: NOAA

== Demographics ==
Historical population
Census	Pop.	Note	%±
1920	251		—
1930	272		8.4%
1940	349		28.3%
1950	311		−10.9%
1960	280		−10.0%
1970	240		−14.3%
1980	278		15.8%
1990	186		−33.1%
2000	207		11.3%
2010	190		−8.2%
2020	141		−25.8%
U.S. Decennial Census

=== 2010 census ===
As of the census of 2010, there were 190 people, 82 households, and 51 families residing in the village. The population density was 730.8 inhabitants per square mile (282.2/km^{2}). There were 104 housing units at an average density of 400.0 per square mile (154.4/km^{2}). The racial makeup of the village was 99.5% White and 0.5% from two or more races. Hispanic or Latino of any race were 0.5% of the population.

There were 82 households, of which 29.3% had children under the age of 18 living with them, 53.7% were married couples living together, 6.1% had a female householder with no husband present, 2.4% had a male householder with no wife present, and 37.8% were non-families. 34.1% of all households were made up of individuals, and 19.5% had someone living alone who was 65 years of age or older. The average household size was 2.32 and the average family size was 2.94.

The median age in the village was 45.7 years. 28.4% of residents were under the age of 18; 4.3% were between the ages of 18 and 24; 16.3% were from 25 to 44; 29.9% were from 45 to 64; and 21.1% were 65 years of age or older. The gender makeup of the village was 47.9% male and 52.1% female.

=== 2000 census ===
As of the census of 2000, there were 207 people, 97 households, and 58 families residing in the village. The population density was 797.3 inhabitants per square mile (307.8/km^{2}). There were 111 housing units at an average density of 427.5 per square mile (165.1/km^{2}). The racial makeup of the village was 99.52% White, and 0.48% from two or more races. Hispanic or Latino of any race were 0.97% of the population.

There were 97 households, out of which 24.7% had children under the age of 18 living with them, 50.5% were married couples living together, 6.2% had a female householder with no husband present, and 40.2% were non-families. 38.1% of all households were made up of individuals, and 22.7% had someone living alone who was 65 years of age or older. The average household size was 2.13 and the average family size was 2.78.

The median age was 46 years. The age distribution was 22.7% under the age of 18, 3.4% from 18 to 24, 21.7% from 25 to 44, 27.1% from 45 to 64, and 25.1% who were 65 years of age or older. For every 100 females, there were 95.3 males. For every 100 females age 18 and over, there were 95.1 males.

As of 2000 the median income for a household in the village was $21,875, and the median income for a family was $25,469. Males had a median income of $19,688 versus $14,792 for females. The per capita income for the village was $10,880. About 9.1% of families and 9.9% of the population were below the poverty line, including 5.4% of those under the age of eighteen and 3.9% of those 65 or over.
