= Albion, Nebraska =

- City
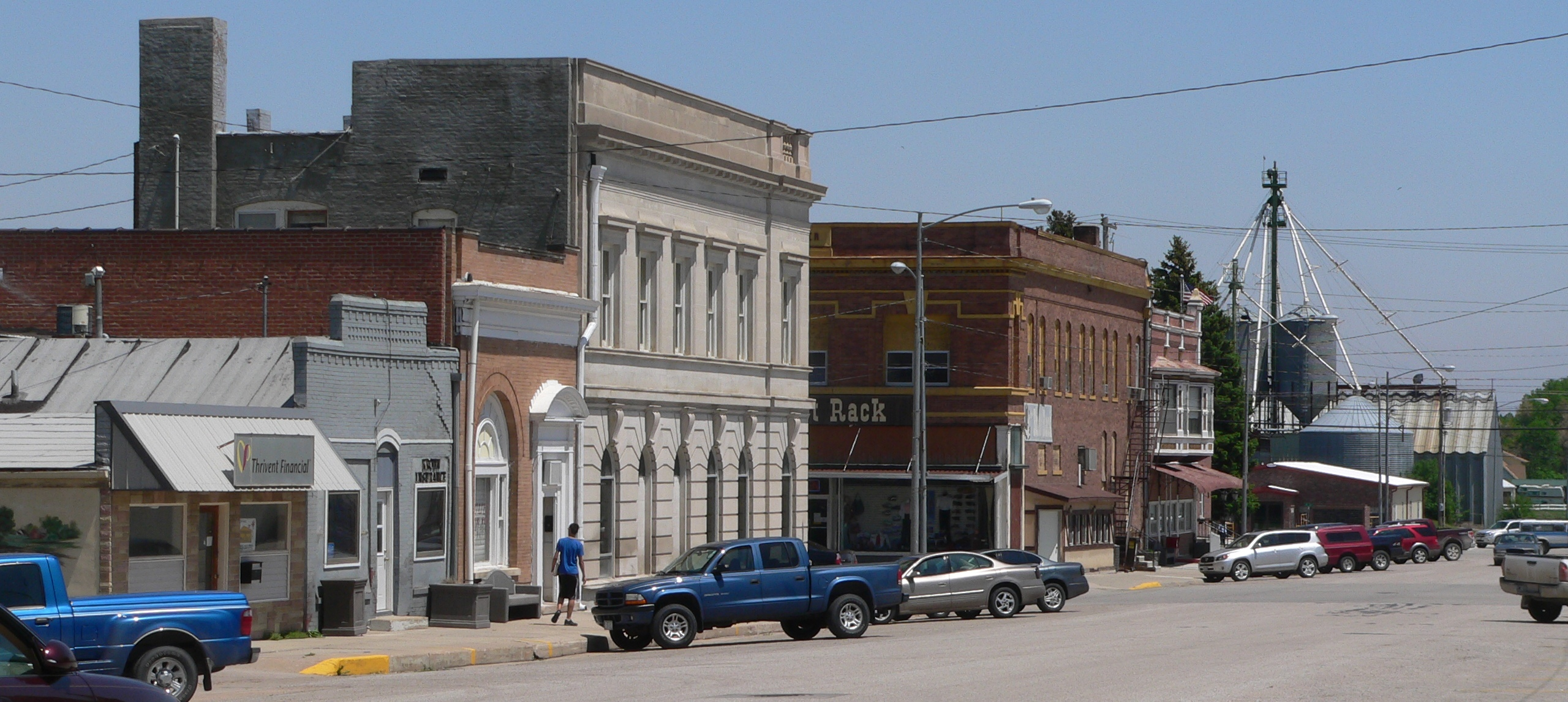
- Downtown Albion: north side of West Church Street, looking eastward

- Logo
- Motto: "Come love where you live."
- Location of Albion, Nebraska
- Coordinates: 41°41′14″N 97°59′56″W
- Country: United States
- State: Nebraska
- County: Boone

Area
  - Total: 1.04 sq mi (2.70 km^{2})
  - Land: 1.04 sq mi (2.70 km^{2})
  - Water: 0 sq mi (0.00 km^{2})
- Elevation: 1,775 ft (541 m)

Population (2020)
  - Total: 1,699
  - Density: 1,627.1/sq mi (628.21/km^{2})
- Time zone: UTC-6 (Central (CST))
  - Summer (DST): UTC-5 (CDT)
- ZIP code: 68620
- Area code: 402
- FIPS code: 31-00555
- GNIS feature ID: 2393908
- Website: www.albionne.com

Albion is a city in and the county seat of Boone County, Nebraska, United States. The population was 1,699 at the 2020 census.

== Geography ==
According to the United States Census Bureau, the city has a total area of 0.99 square miles (2.56 km^{2}), all land.

== History ==
After several weeks of discussion, the name "Albion" was chosen in a game of euchre. Two men played for the name "Albion" and two played for the name "Manchester." The town was platted as "Albion" in 1872 by Loran Clark. The name is a transfer from Albion, Michigan. It was designated county seat in 1873.

== Climate ==
Albion has a humid continental climate (Köppen Dwa), with cold, dry winters and hot summers. Precipitation is highest in the late spring and summer months, with an annual average of 25.7 in (650 mm).

Climate data for Albion, Nebraska (1991–2020, extremes 1893–present)
Month	Jan	Feb	Mar	Apr	May	Jun	Jul	Aug	Sep	Oct	Nov	Dec	Year
Record high °F (°C)	72 (22)	78 (26)	90 (32)	100 (38)	105 (41)	108 (42)	115 (46)	112 (44)	106 (41)	97 (36)	84 (29)	78 (26)	115 (46)
Mean maximum °F (°C)	58.0 (14.4)	63.0 (17.2)	74.1 (23.4)	83.0 (28.3)	88.9 (31.6)	94.6 (34.8)	96.1 (35.6)	94.0 (34.4)	90.1 (32.3)	85.9 (29.9)	71.4 (21.9)	58.8 (14.9)	97.4 (36.3)
Mean daily maximum °F (°C)	32.7 (0.4)	36.9 (2.7)	49.0 (9.4)	60.3 (15.7)	71.0 (21.7)	81.1 (27.3)	84.8 (29.3)	82.6 (28.1)	76.1 (24.5)	63.2 (17.3)	48.6 (9.2)	35.9 (2.2)	60.2 (15.7)
Daily mean °F (°C)	21.9 (−5.6)	25.7 (−3.5)	36.6 (2.6)	47.3 (8.5)	59.2 (15.1)	69.7 (20.9)	73.7 (23.2)	71.2 (21.8)	63.0 (17.2)	50.0 (10.0)	36.4 (2.4)	25.3 (−3.7)	48.3 (9.1)
Mean daily minimum °F (°C)	11.1 (−11.6)	14.5 (−9.7)	24.2 (−4.3)	34.3 (1.3)	47.4 (8.6)	58.2 (14.6)	62.7 (17.1)	59.9 (15.5)	49.8 (9.9)	36.9 (2.7)	24.2 (−4.3)	14.8 (−9.6)	36.5 (2.5)
Mean minimum °F (°C)	−10.8 (−23.8)	−5.8 (−21.0)	4.1 (−15.5)	18.8 (−7.3)	33.2 (0.7)	45.1 (7.3)	50.6 (10.3)	48.7 (9.3)	35.4 (1.9)	19.9 (−6.7)	6.6 (−14.1)	−5.1 (−20.6)	−13.8 (−25.4)
Record low °F (°C)	−37 (−38)	−35 (−37)	−24 (−31)	−2 (−19)	21 (−6)	33 (1)	31 (−1)	32 (0)	20 (−7)	1 (−17)	−18 (−28)	−29 (−34)	−37 (−38)
Average precipitation inches (mm)	0.55 (14)	0.70 (18)	1.67 (42)	2.67 (68)	4.22 (107)	3.77 (96)	3.31 (84)	3.52 (89)	2.69 (68)	2.14 (54)	1.18 (30)	0.81 (21)	27.23 (692)
Average snowfall inches (cm)	5.3 (13)	6.4 (16)	5.0 (13)	2.3 (5.8)	0.1 (0.25)	0.0 (0.0)	0.0 (0.0)	0.0 (0.0)	0.0 (0.0)	0.9 (2.3)	3.1 (7.9)	3.5 (8.9)	26.6 (68)
Average precipitation days (≥ 0.01 in)	4.2	4.1	6.3	8.2	10.4	9.7	8.4	8.7	7.1	6.6	4.6	4.2	82.5
Average snowy days (≥ 0.1 in)	3.6	3.5	2.8	1.1	0.0	0.0	0.0	0.0	0.0	0.5	1.8	3.0	16.3
Source: NOAA

== Demographics ==
Historical population
Census	Pop.	Note	%±
1880	330		—
1890	926		180.6%
1900	1,369		47.8%
1910	1,584		15.7%
1920	1,978		24.9%
1930	2,172		9.8%
1940	2,268		4.4%
1950	2,132		−6.0%
1960	1,982		−7.0%
1970	2,074		4.6%
1980	1,997		−3.7%
1990	1,916		−4.1%
2000	1,797		−6.2%
2010	1,650		−8.2%
2020	1,699		3.0%
U.S. Decennial Census

=== 2010 census ===
As of the census of 2010, there were 1,650 people, 747 households, and 443 families living in the city. The population density was 1,666.7 inhabitants per square mile (643.5/km^{2}). There were 822 housing units at an average density of 830.3 per square mile (320.6/km^{2}). The racial makeup of the city was 98.4% White, 0.2% African American, 0.5% Native American, 0.2% Asian, 0.1% Pacific Islander, 0.2% from other races, and 0.4% from two or more races. Hispanic or Latino of any race were 1.8% of the population.

There were 747 households, of which 24.0% had children under the age of 18 living with them, 48.9% were married couples living together, 7.4% had a female householder with no husband present, 3.1% had a male householder with no wife present, and 40.7% were non-families. 37.6% of all households were made up of individuals, and 23.6% had someone living alone who was 65 years of age or older. The average household size was 2.13 and the average family size was 2.80.

The median age in the city was 47.9 years. 21.6% of residents were under the age of 18; 5.9% were between the ages of 18 and 24; 19.5% were from 25 to 44; 25.1% were from 45 to 64; and 28.1% were 65 years of age or older. The gender makeup of the city was 46.2% male and 53.8% female.

=== 2000 census ===
As of the census of 2000, there were 1,797 people, 754 households, and 465 families living in the city. The population density was 2,252.0 inhabitants per square mile (869.5/km^{2}). There were 835 housing units at an average density of 1,046.4 per square mile (404.0/km^{2}). The racial makeup of the city was 99.11% White, 0.06% Native American, 0.06% Pacific Islander, 0.33% from other races, and 0.45% from two or more races. Hispanic or Latino of any race were 0.95% of the population.

There were 754 households, out of which 29.3% had children under the age of 18 living with them, 52.8% were married couples living together, 7.3% had a female householder with no husband present, and 38.3% were non-families. 35.8% of all households were made up of individuals, and 21.8% had someone living alone who was 65 years of age or older. The average household size was 2.30 and the average family size was 3.01.

In the city, the population was spread out, with 26.0% under the age of 18, 5.4% from 18 to 24, 21.9% from 25 to 44, 20.7% from 45 to 64, and 26.0% who were 65 years of age or older. The median age was 43 years. For every 100 females, there were 82.8 males. For every 100 females age 18 and over, there were 79.0 males.

As of 2000 the median income for a household in the city was $31,111, and the median income for a family was $42,105. Males had a median income of $27,227 versus $18,750 for females. The per capita income for the city was $17,875. About 5.3% of families and 7.3% of the population were below the poverty line, including 9.0% of those under age 18 and 7.5% of those age 65 or over. The town ranks 117th of 537 Nebraska locations ranked per capita.

== Notable people ==
- Historian Viola Florence Barnes
- Major League Baseball pitcher Al Mahon
- Former United States Secretary of the Navy Francis P. Matthews
- Nebraska politician William A. Poynter
