= Tornado outbreak of May 17–18, 2019 =

Weather event in the United States

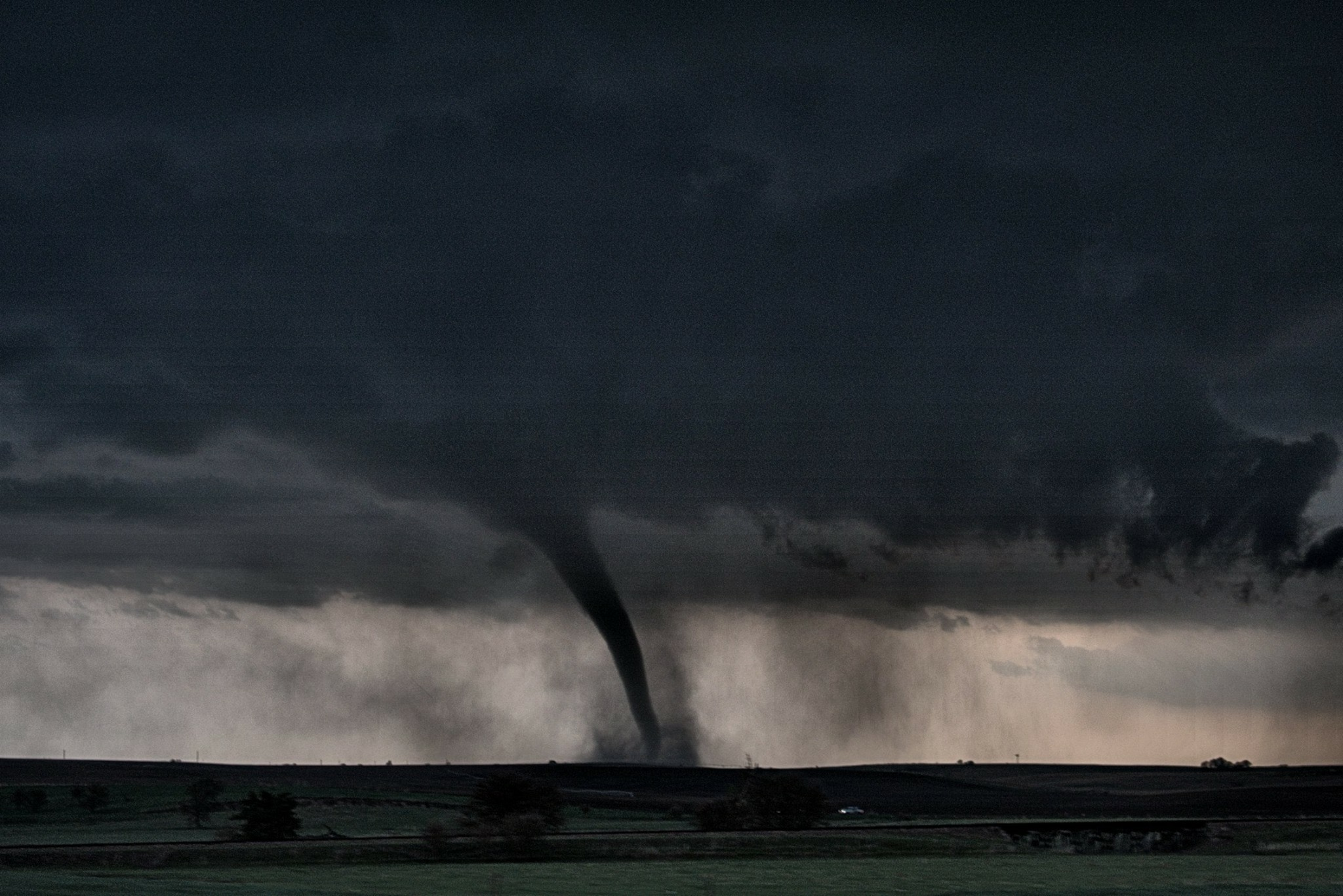
- A tornado near Farnam, Nebraska on May 17

Meteorological history
- Duration: May 17–18, 2019

Tornado outbreak
- Tornadoes: 47
- Max. rating: EF3 tornado
- Duration: 25 hours, 13 minutes
- Highest winds: Tornadic – 157 mph (253 km/h) (Stockville, Nebraska EF3 on May 17)
- Highest gusts: Non-tornadic – 100 mph (160 km/h) near Altus, Arkansas on May 18
- Largest hail: 3 in (7.6 cm) in Trenton, Nebraska on May 17

Overall effects
- Fatalities: 0
- Injuries: 4
- Damage: $1 billion (2019 USD)
- Areas affected: Great Plains, Midwestern United States
- Part of the Tornadoes of 2019

A significant tornado outbreak took place on May 17 and 18, 2019 within the Central United States, including the Great Plains. 47 tornadoes touched down as a result. This outbreak was the beginning of a broader 14-day period of significant tornadic activity in the U.S., which included two other much larger and devastating outbreaks across similar regions. On May 17, multiple strong tornadoes touched down across parts of Nebraska and Kansas, though they remained in mostly rural areas. Numerous EF2 and EF3 tornadoes impacted Texas on May 18, including two EF2 tornadoes that caused significant damage in the cities of Abilene and San Angelo, and an EF3 tornado which caused major damage in Ballinger as well.

Only four people sustained injuries as a result, given the more rural nature of the tornadoes. Total damages were estimated to be at least $1 billion.

== Meteorological synopsis ==
=== May 17 ===
The threat for organized severe weather on May 17 was first outlined five days prior, when the Storm Prediction Center (SPC) outlined the Texas and Oklahoma panhandles, as well as western Kansas, in a 15% probability contour. On the morning of May 14, this risk area was expanded and 30% severe probabilities were introduced as the SPC gained confidence in a widespread and prolonged severe weather outbreak. For the first time in the organization's history, a threat of severe weather was introduced for their entire day 4–8 period. By May 17, a dual enhanced risk existed across the Central Plains, one across much of Nebraska and the second across southwestern Texas kicking off a storm system with various tornadoes. As a large scale upper-level trough ejected into the region, dew points in the low to mid-60s °F surged north in front of a dryline. A cap across the region allowed the atmosphere to become extremely unstable, while an eastward-moving dryline was expected to become the focus for severe thunderstorms later in the day. The SPC noted uncertainty regarding convective development farther south across southwestern Kansas into Oklahoma but mentioned that any thunderstorms would be capable of significant severe weather if they came to fruition.

By late afternoon, several discrete supercell thunderstorms formed across northwestern Kansas and progressed into western and central Nebraska. While weak and largely uniform wind shear caused several splitting storms that destructively interfered with one another, one supercell later in the evening formed within a strongly sheared environment, becoming intense and long-lived as it progressed northeastward. It produced seven tornadoes in total, five of which were weak. One EF2 tornado near McCook caused major damage to a house, outbuildings, and trees, while another EF2 tornado northeast of Stockville rolled 1,400 lb (640 kg) hay bales and snapped twelve power poles. The strongest was an EF3 tornado that extensively damaged or destroyed well-built structures at a farmstead near Stockville. Later in the evening, another long-lived supercell formed in southwestern Kansas where SPC had previously highlighted uncertainty in convective development. This supercell produced four tornadoes in areas southeast of Dodge City, including one rated EF3 and two rated EF2. The EF3 tornado caused severe damage to farmsteads near the towns of Minneola and Bloom, and one of the EF2 tornadoes touched down in the town of Lewis, causing damage there before striking several farmsteads. A total of 21 tornadoes were confirmed.

=== May 18–19 ===
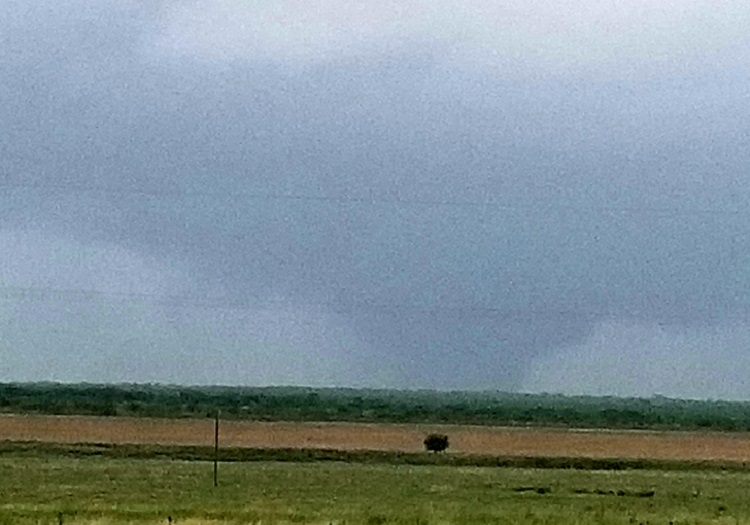
The large EF3 tornado that struck the town of Ballinger, Texas on May 18, 2019.

Into the morning of May 18, the large scale upper-level trough continued to shift eastward. Strong mid- and upper-level winds associated with this feature spread across much of Oklahoma and Texas, accompanied by dewpoints in the upper 60s to lower 70s °F and mixed-layer CAPE values on the order of 2,500–3,500 J/kg. While the prominent threat was expected to be damaging winds along an eastward-moving mesoscale convective system, the SPC noted the potential for embedded and brief tornadoes. Throughout the pre-dawn and early morning, a mixture of semi-discrete and linear thunderstorms developed across central and eastern Oklahoma down into northern Texas. Strong southeasterly surface winds ahead of this convection in Texas provided the impetus for prolific tornado production over subsequent hours as it moved toward the northeast. A long-lived supercell produced seven strong tornadoes as it progressed from near San Angelo, Texas, to northwest of Coleman. Three of these tornadoes reached EF3 intensity, including a large multiple-vortex tornado that struck Ballinger, where homes were left with only interior rooms standing, and a water tower was punctured by flying debris. The cities of San Angelo and Abilene both sustained direct hits from EF2 tornadoes, resulting in severe damage to many homes and businesses. Farther to the north, a brief but strong tornado occurred east of Geronimo, Oklahoma, ripping the roofs and exterior walls off of two homes and injuring one individual. Through the late morning and afternoon, a squall line progressed across eastern Oklahoma and northwestern Arkansas. In the presence of strong instability and very strong low-level shear, numerous tornadoes were confirmed across the region, all rated EF0 or EF1. Fort Smith, Arkansas sustained considerable damage from two separate EF1 tornadoes. Widespread damaging winds were also observed, reaching 100 mph (160 km/h) in some places.

== Confirmed tornadoes ==
Confirmed tornadoes by Enhanced Fujita rating
EFU	EF0	EF1	EF2	EF3	EF4	EF5	Total
6	15	13	8	5	0	0	47

=== May 17 event ===
List of confirmed tornadoes – Friday, May 17, 2019 (Note: All dates are based on the local time zone where the tornado touched down; however, all times are in Coordinated Universal Time for consistency.)
EF#	Location	County / Parish	State	Start Coord.	Time (UTC)	Path length	Max width
EF0	E of Fort Stockton	Pecos	TX	30.829°N 102.559°W	21:43–21:55	2.41 mi (3.88 km)	100 yd (91 m)
EF0	Spotters and emergency management observed a tornado. No damage occurred.						
EFU	S of Culbertson	Hitchcock	NE	40.1142°N 100.83°W	22:40	0.25 mi (0.40 km)	75 yd (69 m)
EFU	An emergency manager reported a tornado, but no damage was found.						
EF2	ESE of Culbertson to NW of McCook	Red Willow	NE	40.2034°N 100.7604°W	22:55–23:01	6 mi (9.7 km)	350 yd (320 m)
EF2	This strong tornado destroyed six grain bins and five farm outbuildings, and produced significant damage to a house, where it collapsed brick walls, lifted half of the structure's roof, and completely removed the garage. A combine sustained damage when it was struck by a grain bin. Windows of cars and homes were shattered, wooden and barbed wire fences were damaged, irrigation pivots were overturned, and numerous trees were snapped.						
EF0	N of McCook	Red Willow, Frontier	NE	40.3452°N 100.627°W	23:10–23:14	2.98 mi (4.80 km)	100 yd (91 m)
EF0	A NWS damage survey found snapped tree branches and minor debris from unknown sources.						
EF0	SW of Stockville	Frontier	NE	40.47°N 100.46°W	23:32–23:33	0.1 mi (0.16 km)	20 yd (18 m)
EF0	A tornado briefly touched down. No damage occurred.						
EF0	Northwestern Stockville	Frontier	NE	40.53°N 100.38°W	23:45–23:46	0.1 mi (0.16 km)	50 yd (46 m)
EF0	A tornado briefly touched down in a field at the northwestern edge of Stockville. No damage occurred.						
EF0	NE of Stockville	Frontier	NE	40.56°N 100.34°W	23:55–23:57	0.5 mi (0.80 km)	315 yd (288 m)
EF0	Several 1,400 lb (640 kg) hay bales were moved, damaging two fences.						
EF2	NE of Stockville	Frontier	NE	40.5812°N 100.3127°W	23:58–00:00	0.6 mi (0.97 km)	178 yd (163 m)
EF2	Numerous 1,400 lb (640 kg) hay bales were rolled across the road, and twelve power poles were snapped.						
EF3	NE of Stockville to SW of Farnam	Frontier	NE	40.6119°N 100.2722°W	00:05–00:09	2.12 mi (3.41 km)	400 yd (370 m)
EF3	A large pole barn was destroyed at a farm, along with a well-built, anchor-bolted garage structure that was swept completely away. A house at this farm was heavily damaged and shifted off of its foundation. A semi-truck and several pivot irrigation systems were overturned, and a large semi-trailer was thrown across a road.						
EF0	NE of Stockville	Frontier	NE	40.6733°N 100.1913°W	00:12–00:13	0.3 mi (0.48 km)	40 yd (37 m)
EF0	A tree trunk was twisted and many large tree limbs were broken.						
EF1	E of Farnam	Frontier, Dawson	NE	40.6992°N 100.1972°W	00:15–00:33	4.67 mi (7.52 km)	400 yd (370 m)
EF1	This tornado downed large tree limbs, uprooted trees, and caused minor damage to homes. Grain bins and outbuildings were damaged or destroyed, and a garage was pushed off its foundation.						
EFU	NNW of Forgan, OK	Beaver (OK), Meade (KS)	OK, KS	36.9622°N 100.5635°W	00:32–00:45	6.74 mi (10.85 km)	50 yd (46 m)
EFU	Storm chasers filmed a tornado crossing the Oklahoma/Kansas state line. No damage was observed.						
EF1	NE of Cozad	Dawson	NE	40.8606°N 99.953°W	00:54–01:10	9.75 mi (15.69 km)	600 yd (550 m)
EF1	Trees and power poles were broken. A large farm machinery shed was demolished and several irrigation pivots were overturned.						
EF0	W of Eddyville	Dawson	NE	41.0026°N 99.7586°W	01:15–01:17	1.58 mi (2.54 km)	150 yd (140 m)
EF0	A storm chaser reported a rain-wrapped tornado. No damage occurred.						
EF1	SE of Oconto	Custer	NE	41.0773°N 99.6836°W	01:30–01:31	0.1 mi (0.16 km)	92 yd (84 m)
EF1	A pole barn was damaged, a tree trunk was snapped, and a house sustained minor porch damage. A horse trailer was rolled over two wooden fences and one metal fence before it landed in a horse corral.						
EF0	N of Fowler	Meade	KS	37.4181°N 100.2255°W	00:36–00:38	1.54 mi (2.48 km)	50 yd (46 m)
EF0	A trained storm spotter witnessed an intermittent tornado. No damage occurred.						
EF3	SE of Fowler to W of Ford	Meade, Clark, Ford	KS	37.3497°N 100.1384°W	01:37–02:22	29.62 mi (47.67 km)	600 yd (550 m)
EF3	This significant, long-tracked tornado passed near the towns of Minneola and Bloom, significantly damaging multiple farmsteads. A semi-truck was blown off the road near the beginning of the path. Homes sustained major structural damage, including roof and exterior wall loss. Barns and outbuildings were completely destroyed, including a metal-framed structure that was severely mangled. Farm machinery was thrown and damaged, trees were snapped and denuded, and a wooden projectile was speared into a dirt road.						
EF0	W of Minneola	Clark	KS	37.4457°N 100.0765°W	01:46–01:47	0.42 mi (0.68 km)	25 yd (23 m)
EF0	A storm chaser reported a tornado. No damage occurred.						
EF2	NE of Ford to SW of Kinsley	Ford, Edwards	KS	37.6775°N 99.7119°W	02:30–02:58	14.86 mi (23.91 km)	875 yd (800 m)
EF2	A high-end EF2 wedge tornado snapped, denuded, and uprooted numerous trees. A house was damaged, a truck had its windows blown-out, and a large motorhome was overturned. Large metal grain bins were crumpled and destroyed, and several barns and outbuildings were destroyed as well.						
EF2	Lewis to N of Belpre	Edwards, Pawnee	KS	37.9405°N 99.2515°W	03:19–03:37	10.92 mi (17.57 km)	565 yd (517 m)
EF2	This tornado touched down in Lewis, where numerous trees were downed, a semi-truck was flipped, outbuildings were destroyed, and minor structural damage occurred. Elsewhere along the path, pivot irrigation systems were flipped, and homes and outbuildings sustained significant damage at several farmsteads.						
EFU	N of Seward	Pawnee	KS	38.2521°N 98.7974°W	04:28–04:30	0.8 mi (1.3 km)	50 yd (46 m)
EFU	A storm chaser reported a tornado. No damage occurred.						
EFU	SE of Dundee	Barton	KS	38.27°N 98.81°W	04:30–04:31	0.22 mi (0.35 km)	50 yd (46 m)
EFU	A trained storm spotter witnessed a brief rope tornado. No damage occurred.						

=== May 18 event ===
List of confirmed tornadoes – Saturday, May 18, 2019
EF#	Location	County / Parish	State	Start Coord.	Time (UTC)	Path length	Max width
EF2	N of Eldorado	Schleicher	TX	31.0384°N 100.5931°W	07:05–07:13	2.08 mi (3.35 km)	250 yd (230 m)
EF2	Tree damage occurred, a stone house had its roof torn off, and a vehicle was moved. One person was injured.						
EF2	N of Knickerbocker to San Angelo	Tom Green	TX	31.3230°N 100.6501°W	09:57–10:46	17.58 mi (28.29 km)	1,760 yd (1,610 m)
EF2	This damaging tornado touched down near Knickerbocker, causing severe roof and exterior wall damage to a house and destroying a large garage structure. A gymnasium had a cinder block exterior wall blown out as well. The tornado weakened and entered the southwest side of San Angelo, and then moved northeastward through the downtown area. Damage along this portion of the path consisted of minor shingle and chimney damage to homes and a restaurant, downed fences and tree limbs, and damage to a gas station awning. A few trees were also uprooted in downtown San Angelo. High-end EF2 damage occurred in the northern part of the city, where several homes had their roofs torn off, a few of which sustained partial collapse of exterior walls. Many other homes sustained minor to moderate roof damage. A car was thrown into the front wall of one house, and a roof shingle was found impaled into a sheet metal fence in this area.						
EF2	Western Abilene	Taylor	TX	32.4191°N 99.8388°W	10:43–10:53	5.04 mi (8.11 km)	388 yd (355 m)
EF2	A strong tornado touched down to the east of Dyess Air Force Base in Abilene and moved through the western part of the city. A manufactured building at an elementary school was destroyed, and homes sustained partial to total roof loss. Vehicles were moved and damaged by flying debris, and a storage facility was significantly damaged with sheet metal debris scattered throughout the area. Power poles were snapped, and many trees were downed, some of which landed on homes.						
EF1	Northern Abilene	Taylor, Jones	TX	32.491°N 99.7372°W	10:56–11:18	8.8 mi (14.2 km)	550 yd (500 m)
EF1	A metal building had its roof ripped off, windows blown out, and north-facing exterior wall damaged. A billboard was ripped up, an 18-wheeler was flipped over, and trees were snapped or uprooted. Two residences and a number of outbuildings were damaged outside the city.						
EF3	SSW of Lowake to Northwestern Ballinger	Concho, Runnels	TX	31.5142°N 100.0926°W	11:52–12:31	18.01 mi (28.98 km)	1,760 yd (1,610 m)
EF3	In and around Lowake, this large and intense multiple-vortex tornado destroyed numerous outbuildings and an RV camper, and tossed a large metal storage tank. Farther along the path, a home lost its roof and exterior walls. As the tornado passed to the east of Rowena, two additional homes sustained total roof and exterior wall loss, and a large brick commercial building was leveled. Past Rowena, the tornado swept away a poorly anchored home, leaving only the concrete foundation slab behind. Nearby vehicles were tossed and damaged, and trees were partially debarked. The tornado struck the northwest part of Ballinger before dissipating, where several homes were left with only interior rooms standing, the athletic fields at the local high school sustained major damage, and a water tower was punctured by flying debris, resulting in a major water leak. Numerous trees and power poles were snapped along the path, and pivot irrigation systems were flipped and twisted. One person was injured.						
EF2	E of Geronimo	Comanche	OK	34.473°N 98.334°W	12:37–12:38	0.5 mi (0.80 km)	60 yd (55 m)
EF2	A brief but strong tornado ripped the roofs and exterior walls off of two homes. One person suffered a minor injury.						
EF3	NE of Benoit	Runnels	TX	31.8350°N 99.7791°W	12:52–13:02	5.79 mi (9.32 km)	1,760 yd (1,610 m)
EF3	A significant tornado collapsed metal truss towers, bent large metal power line pylons to the ground, and completely swept away a metal-framed outbuilding. Another metal outbuilding was damaged, power poles were leaned, and trees were snapped or uprooted, some of which were severely debarked.						
EF3	NW of Coleman	Coleman	TX	31.8604°N 99.5939°W	13:20–13:43	7.84 mi (12.62 km)	300 yd (270 m)
EF3	This intense tornado destroyed a cabin, outbuildings, and trees. The second floor of a well-built home was removed, and two exterior walls were collapsed as well.						
EF0	ESE of Stillwater	Payne	OK	36.106°N 97.002°W	14:27	0.2 mi (0.32 km)	25 yd (23 m)
EF0	An outbuilding and a detached garage were severely damaged.						
EF0	ENE of Ingalls	Payne	OK	36.102°N 96.87°W	14:33	0.4 mi (0.64 km)	50 yd (46 m)
EF0	Three barns and a shop were significantly damaged.						
EFU	SE of Santo	Palo Pinto	TX	32.58°N 98.2°W	15:42	0.01 mi (0.016 km)	25 yd (23 m)
EFU	A trained storm spotter observed vegetation debris as the tornado was ongoing.						
EF0	W of Bixby	Tulsa	OK	35.9285°N 95.9464°W	16:03–16:08	3.7 mi (6.0 km)	350 yd (320 m)
EF0	A weak tornado blew the roof off an outbuilding, caused minor damage to homes, and snapped tree limbs						
EF0	NNE of Cottonwood	Coal	OK	34.647°N 96.178°W	16:18	0.5 mi (0.80 km)	50 yd (46 m)
EF0	Multiple large shipping containers were blown over and multiple light frame structures were damaged at a natural gas production facility that was under construction. Flying debris damaged numerous vehicles and injured three people.						
EFU	E of Melvin	McCulloch	TX	31.2014°N 99.5676°W	16:34–16:35	0.06 mi (0.097 km)	50 yd (46 m)
EFU	A trained storm spotter sighted a tornado in open country.						
EF1	E of Claremore to SW of Adair	Rogers, Mayes	OK	36.3049°N 95.4547°W	16:58–17:11	10.1 mi (16.3 km)	400 yd (370 m)
EF1	Multiple homes sustained minor damage, and numerous trees were snapped or uprooted. Some power poles were also snapped.						
EF0	NW of Langley	Mayes	OK	36.47°N 95.086°W	17:32–17:35	2.1 mi (3.4 km)	100 yd (91 m)
EF0	Outbuildings were damaged and power poles were blown down. Some tree limbs were also damaged.						
EF1	N of McCurtain	Haskell	OK	35.1901°N 94.9903°W	18:13–18:15	1.2 mi (1.9 km)	100 yd (91 m)
EF1	Several trees were uprooted.						
EF1	SSW of Arkoma, OK to Fort Smith, AR	Le Flore (OK), Sebastian (AR)	OK, AR	35.3400°N 94.4381°W	18:55–19:04	5.3 mi (8.5 km)	450 yd (410 m)
EF1	A tornado impacted southwestern Arkoma, damaging trees, before crossing into Arkansas and striking Fort Smith. There, numerous homes and businesses sustained roof damage and broken windows. Power poles were snapped, and numerous large trees were downed, some of which landed on homes and caused major structural damage.						
EF1	Northern Greenwood	Sebastian	AR	35.2203°N 94.2919°W	18:59–19:04	3.5 mi (5.6 km)	600 yd (550 m)
EF1	Numerous trees were snapped or uprooted, power poles were snapped, and homes sustained roof damage in the northern part of Greenwood.						
EF1	Prairie Grove	Washington	AR	35.98°N 94.3468°W	19:01–19:02	1 mi (1.6 km)	100 yd (91 m)
EF1	Trees and power poles were blown down.						
EF1	Southeastern Fort Smith	Sebastian, Crawford	AR	35.3462°N 94.3164°W	19:04–19:09	2.9 mi (4.7 km)	400 yd (370 m)
EF1	Numerous trees were snapped or uprooted and homes were damaged in the southeastern part of Fort Smith.						
EF1	SE of Lavaca to NNE of Charleston	Sebastian, Franklin	AR	35.2857°N 94.1170°W	19:10–19:19	7.3 mi (11.7 km)	1,000 yd (910 m)
EF1	Numerous trees were snapped or uprooted and chicken houses were damaged.						
EF1	Mulberry	Crawford	AR	35.5052°N 94.0617°W	19:25–19:27	1.6 mi (2.6 km)	300 yd (270 m)
EF1	A brief tornado impacted Mulberry, uprooting trees and damaging homes.						
EF1	NW of New Chapel Hill	Smith	TX	32.3121°N 95.2087°W	22:45–22:48	0.72 mi (1.16 km)	200 yd (180 m)
EF1	The roofs of two metal outbuildings and a single family home were damaged, along with a Dairy Queen sign. Trees were snapped and uprooted as well.						
EF0	W of Slovak	Prairie	AR	34.66°N 91.64°W	22:55–22:56	0.25 mi (0.40 km)	50 yd (46 m)
EF0	A tornado caused minor damage to grain bins.						

== See also ==
- Weather of 2019
- List of North American tornadoes and tornado outbreaks
