= Nebraska Highway 23 =

State highway in Nebraska, U.S.

State Highway 23

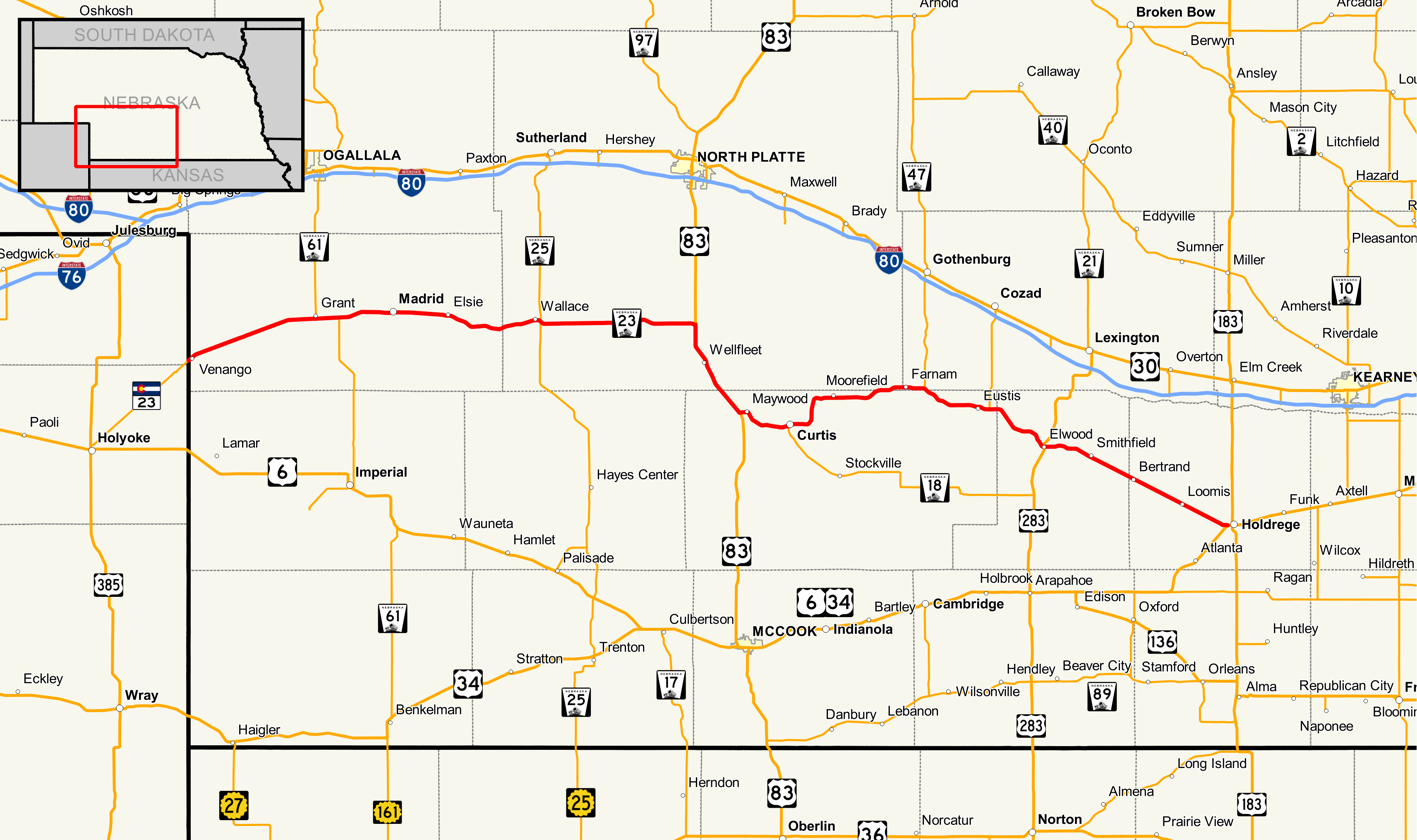
- Nebraska Highway 23 highlighted in red

Route information
- Maintained by NDOT
- Length: 159.91 mi (257.35 km)

Major junctions
- West end: SH 23 at Venango
- N-61 in Grant; US 83 north of Wellfleet; US 283 in Elwood
- East end: US 6 / US 34 at Holdrege

Location
- Country: United States
- State: Nebraska
- Counties: Perkins, Lincoln, Frontier, Dawson, Gosper, Phelps

Highway system
- Nebraska State Highway System; Interstate; US; State; Link; Spur; State Spurs; Recreation
← N-22	→ N-24

Nebraska Highway 23 is a 159.91-mile (257.35 km) highway in southwestern Nebraska, United States. Its western terminus is on the Colorado border at Venango, where the highway continues west as Colorado State Highway 23. The eastern terminus of NE 23 is at Holdrege at an intersection with U.S. Routes 6 and 34.

== Route description ==
Nebraska Highway 23 begins at the Colorado border at Venango. It passes northeasterly through farmland towards Grant, where it meets Nebraska Highway 61. After a brief concurrency, NE 23 and NE 61 separate and NE 23 continues east. Near Wallace, NE 23 meets Nebraska Highway 25. It continues east and near Wellfleet, meets U.S. Route 83. NE 23 turns south with US 83 and continues south until near Maywood, where they separate. After going east through Maywood, NE 23 continues east and meets Nebraska Highway 18 at Curtis. After a brief segment which runs northward, it passes Moorefield and continues on through Farnam. Near Farnam, NE 23 meets Nebraska Highway 47 and turns southeasterly. It passes through Eustis and meets Nebraska Highway 21. It continues southeasterly and meets U.S. Highway 283 in Elwood. It continues in a southeastern direction through Smithfield, Bertrand, and Loomis and ends at an intersection with US Routes 6 and 34 at the western end of Holdrege.

== Major intersections ==
County	Location	mi	km	Destinations	Notes
Perkins	Venango	0.00	0.00	SH 23 west – Holyoke	Continuation into Colorado
Perkins	Grant	18.29	29.43	N-61 north (Central Avenue) – Ogallala	Western end of N-61 concurrency
Perkins	District 1	21.38	34.41	N-61 south – Imperial	Eastern end of N-61 concurrency
Lincoln	Wallace Precinct	49.25	79.26	N-25 – Sutherland, Hayes Center	
Lincoln	Medicine Pricinct	70.41	113.31	US 83 north – North Platte	Western end of US 83 concurrency
Frontier	East Laird Precinct	84.06	135.28	US 83 south – McCook	Eastern end of US 83 concurrency
Frontier	Curtis	91.55	147.34	N-18 east (Center Avenue) – Stockville	
Dawson	Farnam Precinct	113.11	182.03	N-47 north – Gothenburg	
Frontier	Fairview Precinct	122.77	197.58	N-21 north (Clayton Yeutter Highway) – Cozad	
Gosper	Elwood	132.53	213.29	US 283 (Smith Avenue)	
Phelps	Holdrege	159.91	257.35	US 6 / US 34	Eastern terminus
1.000 mi = 1.609 km; 1.000 km = 0.621 mi: Concurrency terminus

== See also ==
- List of state highways in Nebraska
