= Nebraska Highway 21 =

State highway in Nebraska, U.S.

State Highway 21

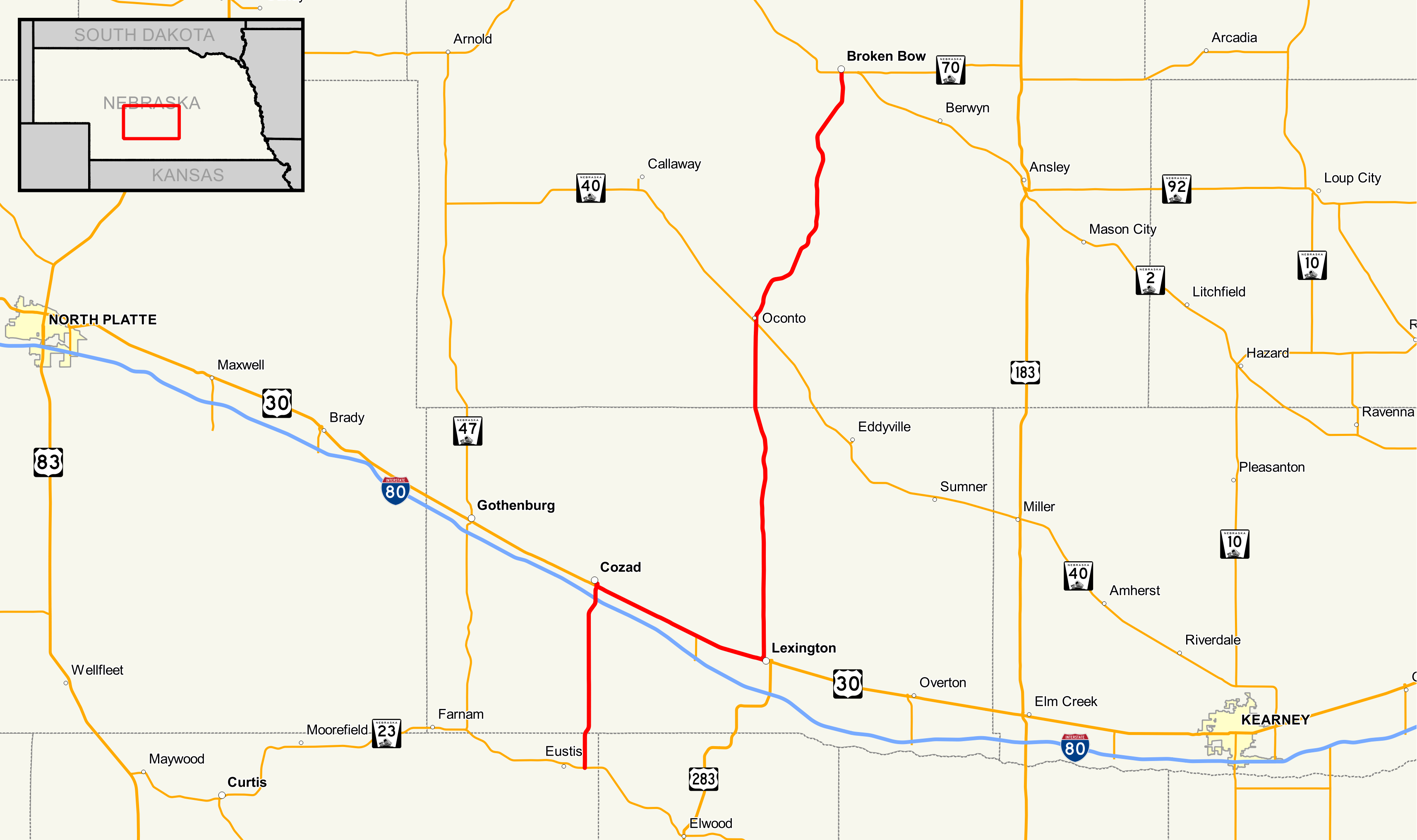
- Nebraska Highway 21 highlighted in red

Route information
- Maintained by NDOT
- Length: 73.37 mi (118.08 km)
- Existed: 1925–present

Major junctions
- South end: N-23 near Eustis
- I-80 south of Cozad; US 30 in Cozad
- North end: N-2 / N-92 in Broken Bow

Location
- Country: United States
- State: Nebraska
- Counties: Frontier, Dawson, Custer

Highway system
- Nebraska State Highway System; Interstate; US; State; Link; Spur; State Spurs; Recreation
← US 20	→ N-22

Nebraska Highway 21 is a highway in central Nebraska. Its southern terminus is at Nebraska Highway 23 east of Eustis. Its northern terminus is at an intersection with Nebraska Highway 2 and Nebraska Highway 92 in Broken Bow.

== Route description ==
Nebraska Highway 21 begins a mile east of Eustis at an intersection with Nebraska Highway 23. It goes north through farmland and meets Interstate 80 shortly before Cozad. In Cozad, it meets U.S. Highway 30 and goes on a 13-mile (21 km) concurrency eastward to Lexington. At Lexington, it turns north into rural prairie areas and meets Nebraska Highway 40 in Oconto. After passing Oconto, it turns north-northeasterly and ends in Broken Bow when it meets Nebraska Highway 2 and Nebraska Highway 92.

== History ==
The original version of Nebraska Highway 21 went south from Lexington and turned east to go through Beaver City and Alma. In the 1940s, U.S. Highway 283 was created and took over the segment of the highway south of Lexington, with the Beaver City-Alma segment becoming Nebraska Highway 89. In 1960, the current route was completed, as the Cozad-Eustis segment was completed, and the highway extended along US 30.

== Major intersections ==
County	Location	mi	km	Destinations	Notes
Frontier		0.00	0.00	N-23 – Elwood, Eustis	Southern terminus
Dawson	Cozad	12.69	20.42	I-80 – Kearney, North Platte	Exit 222 on I-80
Dawson	Cozad	14.05	22.61	US 30 west (Lincoln Highway) – Gothenburg, North Platte	Southern end of US-30 concurrency
Dawson		22.28	35.86	L-24A south	
Dawson	Lexington	27.51	44.27	US 30 east (West Pacific Avenue) – Overton, Kearney	Northern end of US-30 concurrency
Custer	Oconto	52.46	84.43	N-40 – Eddyville, Callaway	
Custer	Broken Bow	73.37	118.08	N-2 / N-92 (South E Street) – Berwyn, Merna	Northern terminus
1.000 mi = 1.609 km; 1.000 km = 0.621 mi: Concurrency terminus
