= Colorado State Highway 23 =

State highway in Colorado, United States

State Highway 23
- SH 23 highlighted in red

Route information
- Maintained by CDOT
- Length: 17.7 mi (28.5 km)
- Existed: 1989–present

Major junctions
- South end: US 385 in Holyoke
- North end: N-23 at the Nebraska state line in Venango, NE

Location
- Country: United States
- State: Colorado
- Counties: Phillips, Sedgwick

Highway system
- Colorado State Highway System; Interstate; US; State; Scenic
← SH 22	→ US 24

State Highway 23 (SH 23) is a 17.7-mile (28.5 km) state highway in Phillips and Sedgwick counties in the northeastern corner of Colorado, United States, that connects U.S. Route 385 (US 385) in Holyoke with Nebraska Highway 23 (N-23) in Nebraska.

== Route description ==
SH 23 begins at an intersection with US 385 (North Interocean Avenue) and Howitt Street in Holyoke, near the city's northern edge. (US 385 heads north toward Julesburg and south to connect with U.S. Route 6 (US 6) in Holyoke, and then on toward Wray, Idalia, and Burlington. Howitt Street heads west along the northern edge of the Phillips County Raceway.) From its southern terminus SH 23 heads very briefly due east (immediately leaving Holyoke) until it reaches the BNSF Railway tracks and then turns northeast to run parallel with the tracks through rural agricultural area. About 9.6 miles (15.4 km) from the beginning of the route, and after connecting with multiple county roads, SH 23 passed through the census-designated place of Amherst.

Continuing northeast along the north side of the BNSF tracks from Amherst, SH 23 travel through more agricultural area and connects with several more county roads. Roughly 5.6 miles (9.0 km) northeast of Amherst, the route has a slight S curve, crossing over the tracks in the middle of the curve at a level crossing. Approximately, 1.6 miles (2.6 km) northeast of the railroad crossing, SH 23 leaves Phillips County and enters Sedgwick County. About 0.8 miles (1.3 km) farther northeast, SH 23 reaches its northern terminus at County Road 63.2 (CR 63.2), which runs along the Colorado-Nebraska state line. (The highway continues northeast into Nebraska as Nebraska Highway 23 [NE-23] and quickly enters Venango. CR 63.2 heads north along the state line toward Big Springs, Nebraska and south along the state line toward US 6.)

For its entire length of SH 23 is two-lane road, with no major junctions and, other than Holyoke and Amherst, does not pass near any populated paces.

== History ==

The route established in about 1935, but was originally designated as SH 176. The highway was decommissioned in 1952 but was reinstated in 1968 (still as SH 176). To avoid confusion with Interstate 76 (I-76), which runs less than 20 miles (32 km) to the north of the route, and to match Nebraska's connecting highway number (NE-23), the former SH 176 was renumbered as SH 23 in 1989.

== Major intersections ==
County	Location	mi	km	Destinations	Notes
Phillips	Holyoke	0.000	0.000	Howitt Street west	Continuation west from southern terminus
Phillips	Holyoke	0.000	0.000	US 385 north – Julesburg US 385 south (North Interocean Avenue) – US 6, Wray, Idalia, Burlington	Southern terminus
Sedgwick		17.507	28.175	County Road 63.2 north – Big Springs (Nebraska); County Road 63.2 south – US 6	Northern terminus
Sedgwick		17.507	28.175	N-23 east – Venango (Nebraska)	Continuation northeast into Nebraska from northern terminus
1.000 mi = 1.609 km; 1.000 km = 0.621 mi

== See also ==
- List of state highways in Colorado
