= Medicine Creek Dam =

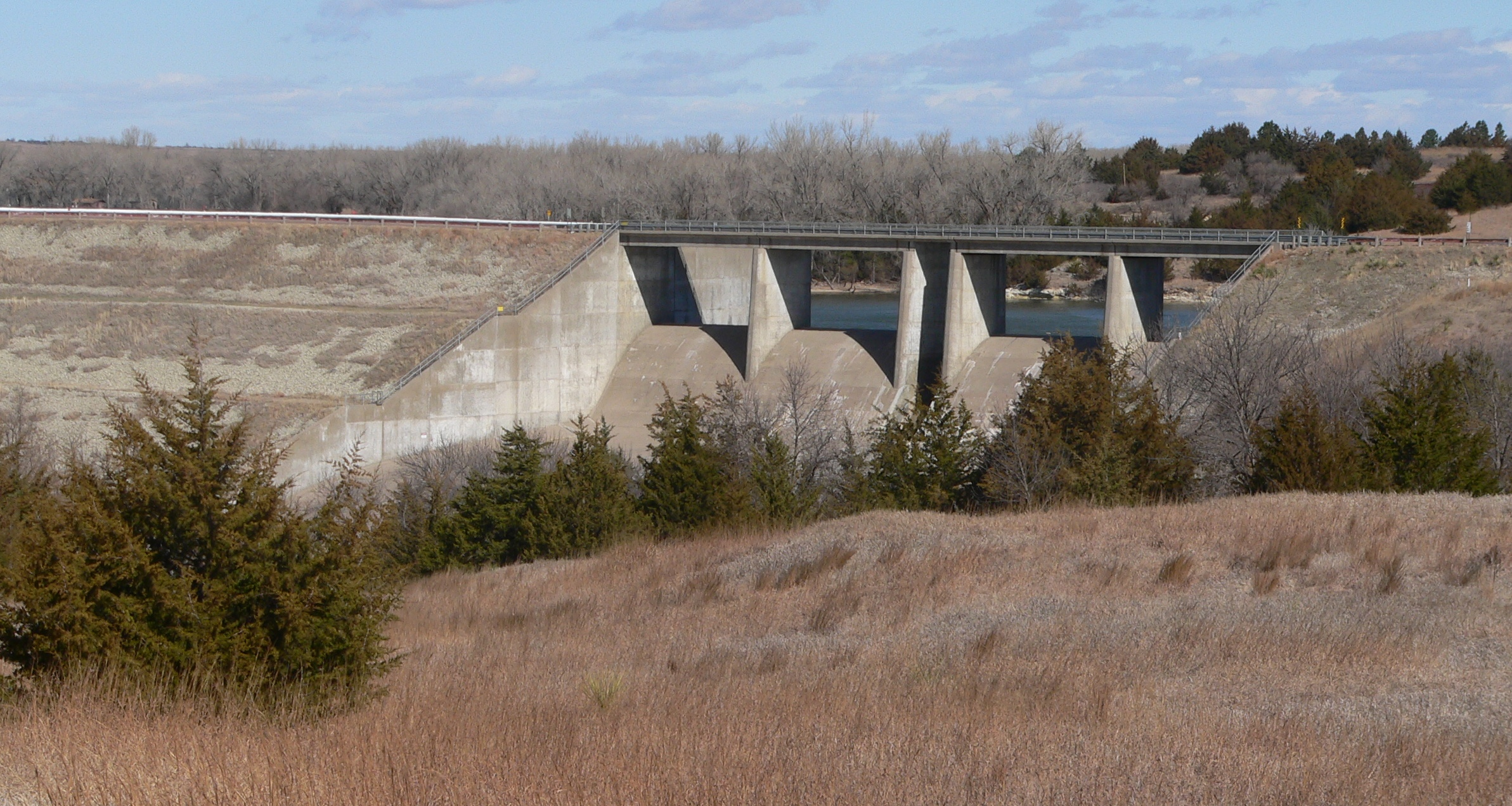
- Spillway structure at Medicine Creek Dam

- Location within Nebraska Location within the United States
- Location: Frontier County, Nebraska
- Coordinates: 40°22′44″N 100°13′08″W
- Status: Operational
- Construction began: 1948
- Opening date: 1949
- Built by: United States Bureau of Reclamation
- Owner: United States Bureau of Reclamation
- Operator: United States Bureau of Reclamation

Dam and spillways
- Impounds: Medicine Creek
- Height: 165 ft (50 m)
- Length: 5,665 ft (1,727 m)

Reservoir
- Creates: Harry Strunk Lake
- Total capacity: 35,705 acre⋅ft (44,041,000 m^{3})
- Surface area: 1,850 acres (750 ha)
- Normal elevation: 2,365 ft (721 m)

Medicine Creek Dam (National ID # NE01073) is a dam in Frontier County, Nebraska.

The earthen and rockfill dam was constructed in 1948 and 1949 by the United States Bureau of Reclamation. It is 165 feet (50 m) high, and 5,665 feet (1,727 m) long at its crest. It impounds Medicine Creek for flood control, part of the Frenchman-Cambridge Division of the Bureau's extensive Pick–Sloan Missouri Basin Program. The dam is owned and operated by the Bureau.

The reservoir it creates, Harry Strunk Lake, has a water surface of 1,850 acres (750 ha), a land area of 7,093 acres (2,870 ha), approximately 29 miles (47 km) of shoreline, and a capacity of 35,705 acre-feet (44,041,000 m^{3}). It was named for the founding editor of the local McCook Daily Gazette.

Recreation includes fishing (for walleye, crappie, white bass, channel catfish, etc.), hunting, boating, camping and hiking. The state of Nebraska maintains the surrounding Medicine Creek State Wildlife Recreation Area, Medicine Creek Reservoir State Recreation Area, and Medicine Creek State Recreation Area.
