= Nebraska Highway 18 =

State highway in Nebraska, U.S.

State Highway 18

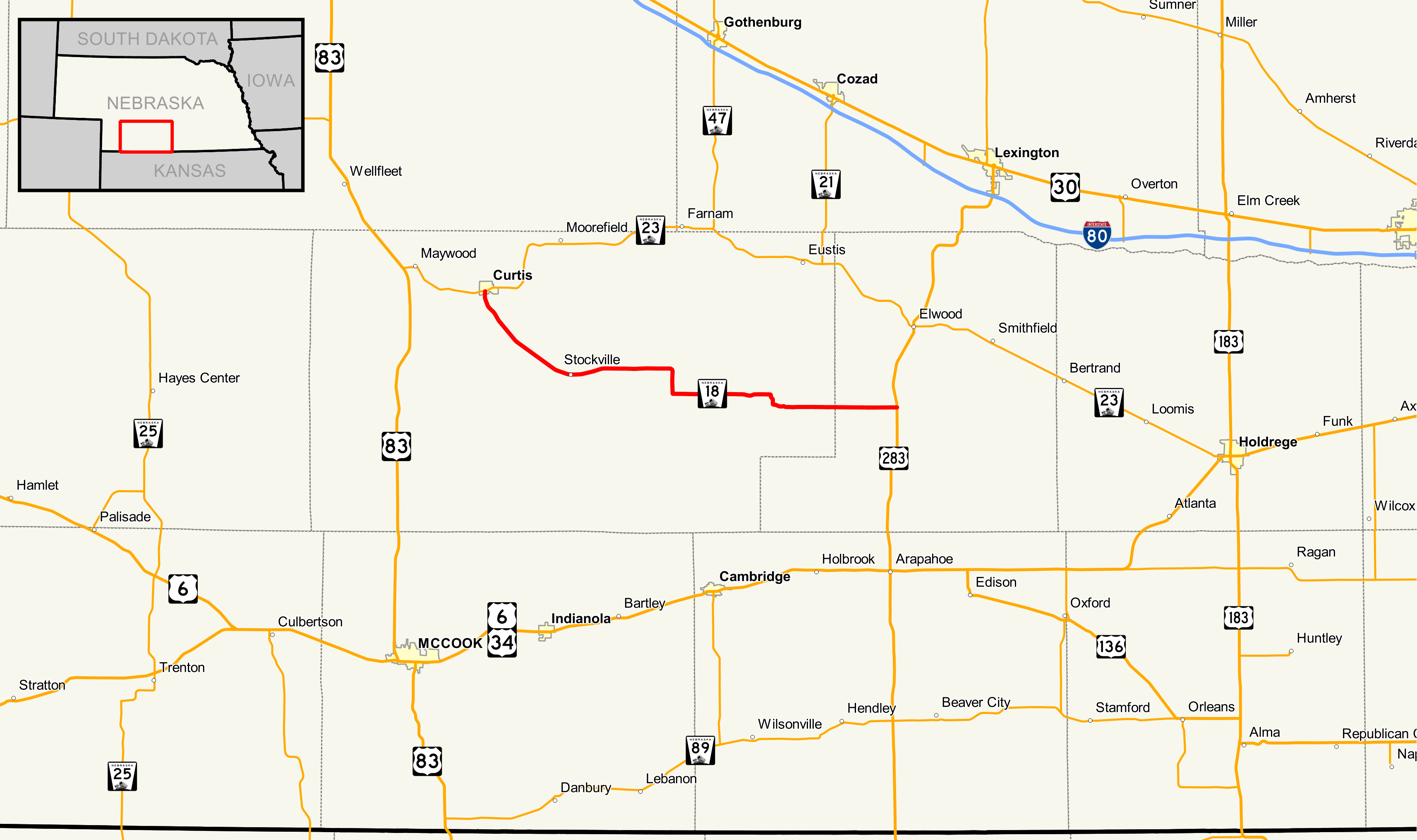
- Nebraska Highway 18 highlighted in red

Route information
- Maintained by NDOT
- Length: 39.01 mi (62.78 km)

Major junctions
- West end: N-23 in Curtis
- East end: US 283 south of Elwood

Location
- Country: United States
- State: Nebraska
- Counties: Frontier, Gosper

Highway system
- Nebraska State Highway System; Interstate; US; State; Link; Spur; State Spurs; Recreation
| ← N-17 | → N-19 |

Nebraska Highway 18 is a highway in southwestern Nebraska. It has a western terminus in Curtis at Nebraska Highway 23. Its eastern terminus is at an intersection with U.S. Highway 283 south of Elwood. The easternmost portion of the highway is a gravel road.

== Route description ==
Nebraska Highway 18 begins in Curtis at an intersection with Nebraska Highway 23. It goes southeast out of Curtis and goes through Stockville. It goes east from Stockville, then turns south for a brief distance. It turns east, and becomes a gravel road for the rest of its route. Except for one brief southward turn, the highway continues due east until it ends at U.S. Highway 283 between Elwood and Arapahoe.

== Major intersections ==
| County | Location | mi | km | Destinations | Notes |
|---|---|---|---|---|---|
| Frontier | Curtis | 1×10^{−9} | 1.6×10^{−9} | N-23 (2nd Street) | Western terminus |
| Gosper | | 39.01 | 62.78 | US 283 | Eastern terminus |
1.000 mi = 1.609 km; 1.000 km = 0.621 mi
