= Mowry Bluff Archeological Site =

- U.S. National Register of Historic Places
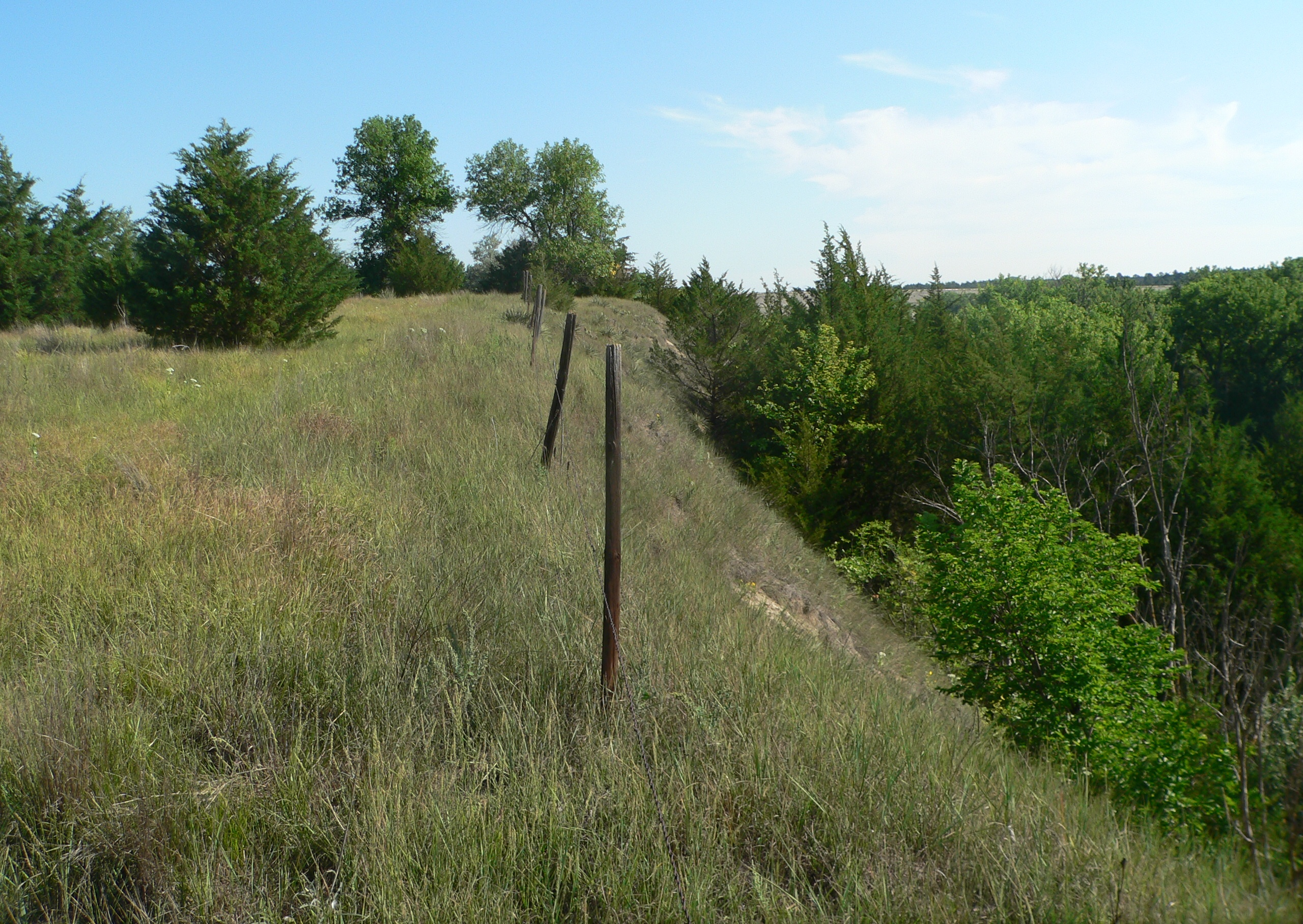

- Location within Nebraska Location within the United States
- Location: Western side of Medicine Creek, immediately east of the center of Section 25, Township 5 North, Range 26 West
- Nearest city: Cambridge, Nebraska
- Coordinates: 40°22′19″N 100°13′26″W
- Area: 10 acres (4.0 ha)
- NRHP reference No.: 74001115
- Added to NRHP: July 12, 1974

The Mowry Bluff Archeological Site, in Frontier County, Nebraska, near Cambridge, Nebraska, is a 10-acre (4.0 ha) archeological site that was listed on the National Register of Historic Places in 1974. Its Smithsonian trinomial designation is 25 FT 35. It is a village site that was listed for its information potential. A "house mound" at the site was explored, and the site was described, by archeologist W. Raymond Wood, of the University of Missouri, before 1970. The Mowry site is one of many in the watershed of Medicine Creek.
