= Wood River Township, Custer County, Nebraska =

Wood River Township
- Township
- Location in Custer County
- Coordinates: 41°07′45″N 099°46′42″W
- Country: United States
- State: Nebraska
- County: Custer

Area
  - Total: 142.9 sq mi (370.1 km^{2})
  - Land: 142.89 sq mi (370.09 km^{2})
  - Water: 0.0039 sq mi (0.01 km^{2}) 0%
- Elevation: 2,598 ft (792 m)

Population (2020)
  - Total: 324
  - Density: 2.27/sq mi (0.875/km^{2})
- GNIS feature ID: 0838337

Wood River Township is one of thirty-one townships in Custer County, Nebraska, United States. The population was 324 at the 2020 census. A 2021 estimate placed the township's population at 321.

The Village of Oconto lies within the Township.

== See also ==
- County government in Nebraska
