= Grainton, Nebraska =

Unincorporated community in Perkins County, Nebraska, United States

- Unincorporated community
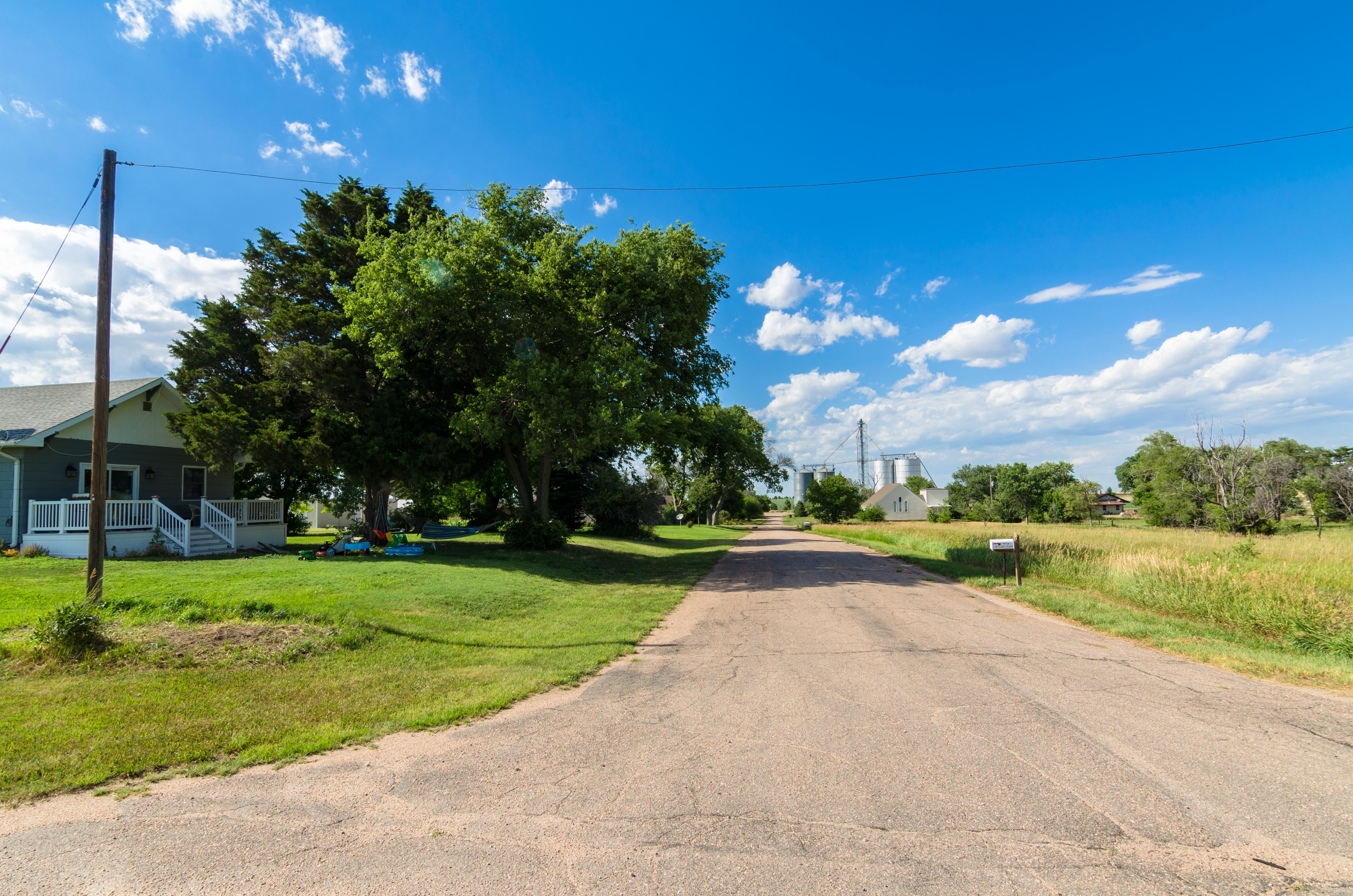
- Hansen Avenue in Grainton, July 2017

- Location within the state of Nebraska
- Coordinates: 40°49′23″N 101°17′15″W
- Country: United States
- State: Nebraska
- County: Perkins
- Elevation: 3,297 ft (1,005 m)
- Time zone: UTC-7 (Mountain (MST))
  - Summer (DST): UTC-6 (MDT)
- ZIP code: 69169
- FIPS code: 31-19525
- GNIS feature ID: 829619

Grainton is an unincorporated community in Perkins County, Nebraska, United States.

== History ==
A post office was established at Grainton in 1918, and remained in operation until it was discontinued in 1981.

Grainton was a shipping point of grain on the railroad.
