= Quick, Nebraska =

Unincorporated area in Nebraska, U.S.

Coordinates: 40°26′21″N 100°38′52″W

Quick is an unincorporated area in Frontier County, Nebraska, United States.

== History ==
A post office called Quick was established in 1887, and remained in operation until 1945. Quick (1887-1945) is an unincorporated place having an official federally recognized name located in Frontier County, Nebraska at latitude 40.439 and longitude -100.648. The elevation is 2,825 feet. Quick appears on the U.S. Geological Survey Map.

Historically, Quick was a community post office, operated out of a sod house owned by the landowner M. Quick. A general store operated until the 1940s at the intersection of Hwy 83 and 732 road, approximately 150 yards south of the original post office site.
