= Orafino, Nebraska =

Unincorporated community in Nebraska, U.S.

Coordinates: 40°29′50″N 100°13′44″W

Orafino is an unincorporated community in Frontier County, Nebraska, in the United States.

== History ==
Orafino is derived from a Spanish name meaning "fine ore". This name Orafino was applied to the place when a settler found iron pyrite.

A post office was established at Orafino in 1880 and remained in operation until it was discontinued in 1952.

== See also ==
- Orofino, Idaho
