= Perkins County Courthouse (Nebraska) =

- U.S. National Register of Historic Places
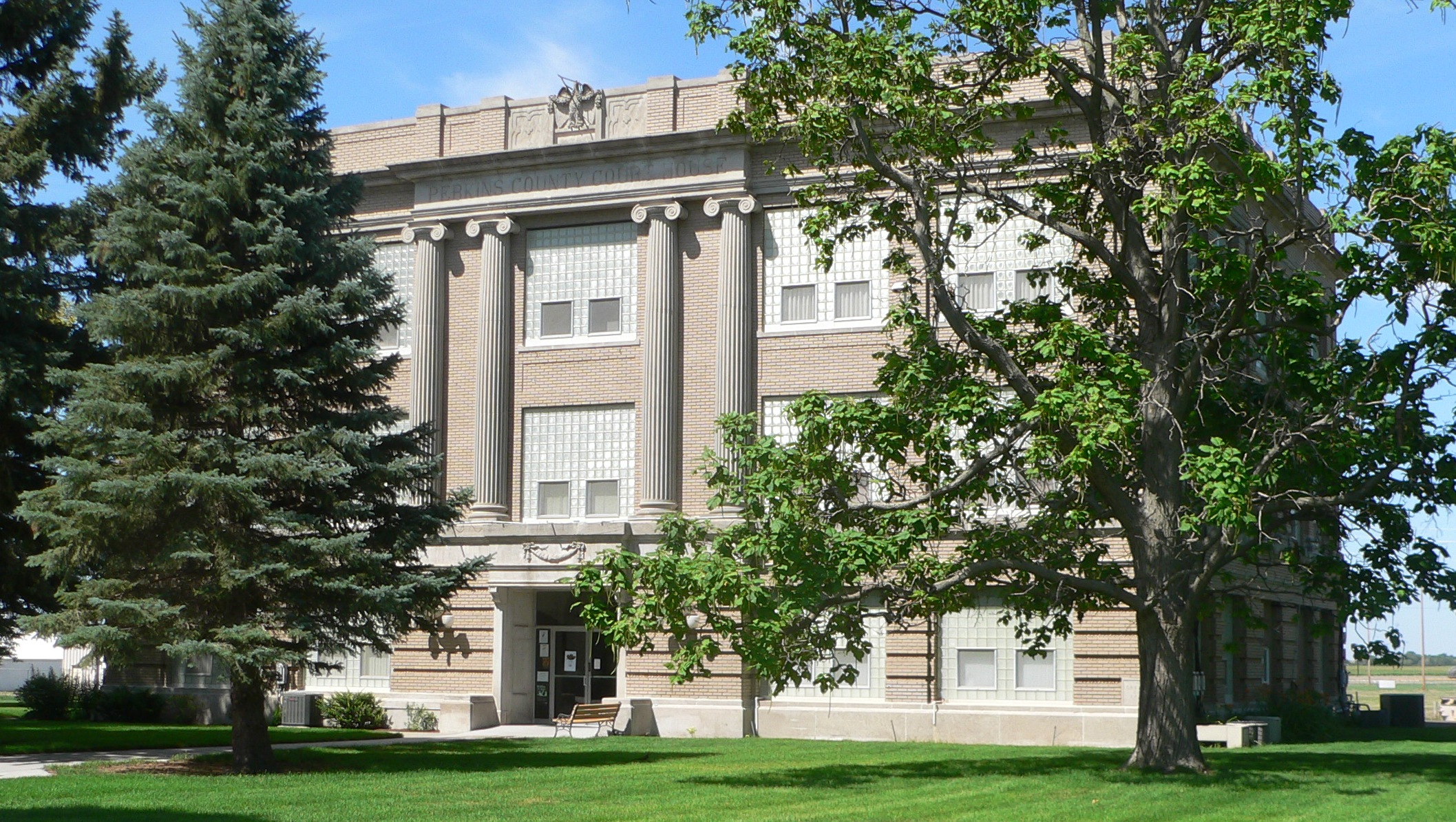

- Location within Nebraska Location within the United States
- Location: Lincoln St. between 2nd and 3rd Sts., Grant, Nebraska
- Coordinates: 40°50′29″N 101°43′37″W
- Area: 1 acre (0.40 ha)
- Built: 1926-27
- Architect: J.F. Reynolds
- Architectural style: Classical Revival
- MPS: County Courthouses of Nebraska MPS
- NRHP reference No.: 90000969
- Added to NRHP: July 5, 1990

The Perkins County Courthouse, located on Lincoln St. in Grant, is the county courthouse of Perkins County, Nebraska. Built in 1926–27, the courthouse is the third used by Perkins County. Architect J.F. Reynolds designed the courthouse in the County Citadel style, a type of courthouse design heavily influenced by Classical Revival architecture. The courthouse is built with rusticated brick and features a recessed main entrance, massive Ionic columns above the entrance, and a parapet with a carved eagle and decorative panels on the front side.

The courthouse was listed on the National Register of Historic Places in 1990.
