= Perkins County, Nebraska =

County in Nebraska, United States

- County
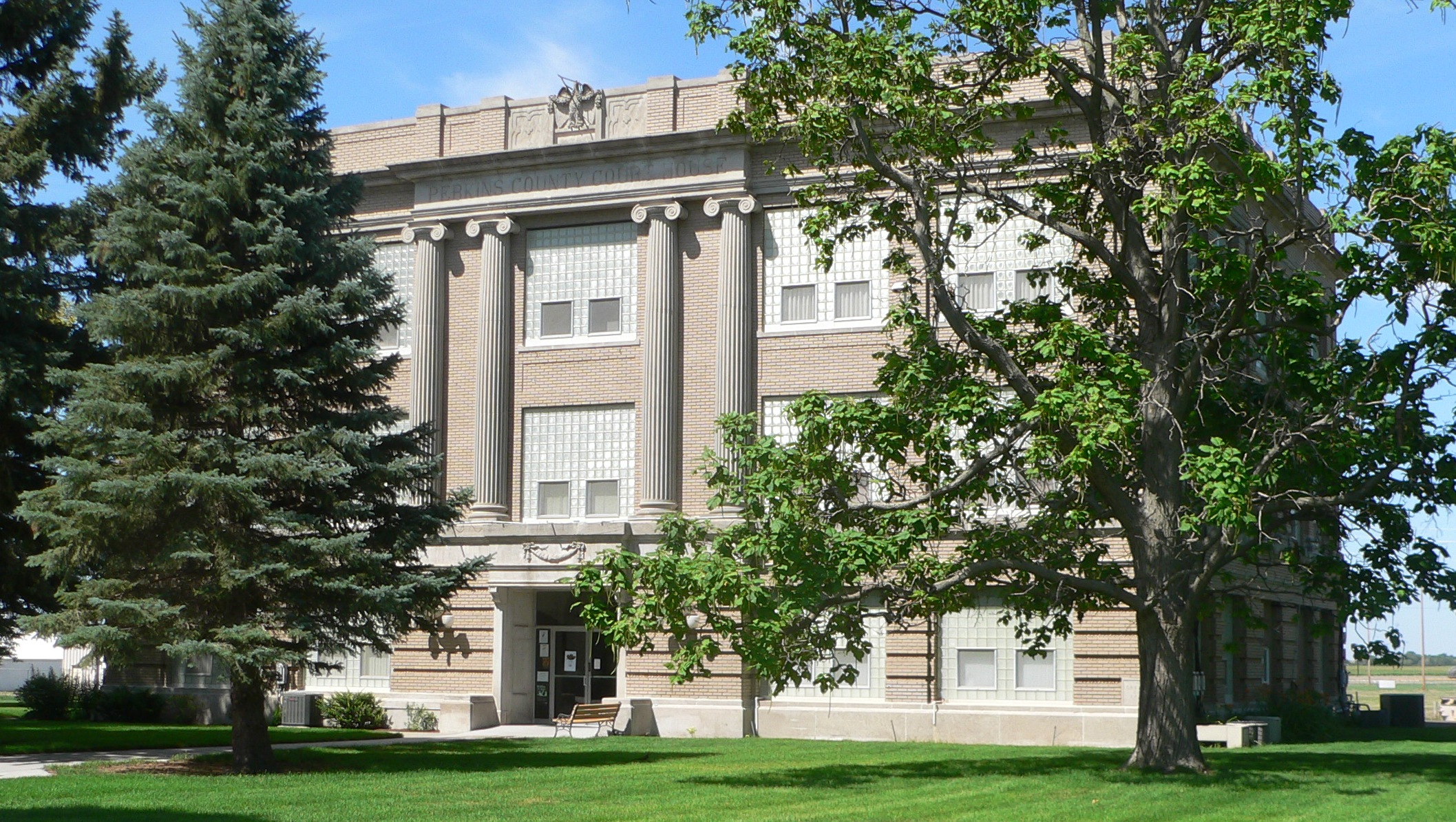
- Perkins County Courthouse in Grant

- Location within the U.S. state of Nebraska
- Coordinates: 40°50′N 101°40′W
- Country: United States
- State: Nebraska
- Founded: 1887
- Named for: Charles Elliott Perkins
- Seat: Grant
- Largest city: Grant

Area
  - Total: 884 sq mi (2,290 km^{2})
  - Land: 883 sq mi (2,290 km^{2})
  - Water: 1.1 sq mi (2.8 km^{2}) 0.1%

Population (2020)
  - Total: 2,858
  - Estimate (2025): 2,849 ▼
  - Density: 3.24/sq mi (1.25/km^{2})
- Time zone: UTC−7 (Mountain)
  - Summer (DST): UTC−6 (MDT)
- Congressional district: 3rd
- Website: perkinscounty.ne.gov

Perkins County is a county located in the U.S. state of Nebraska. As of the 2020 United States census, the population was 2,858. Its county seat is Grant.

In the Nebraska license plate system, Perkins County is represented by the prefix 74 (it had the seventy-fourth-largest number of vehicles registered in the county when the license plate system was established in 1922).

== History ==
Perkins County was organized in 1887. It is believed to have been named for Charles E. Perkins, the president of the Chicago, Burlington and Quincy Railroad.

== Geography ==
Perkins County lies on the southwest side of Nebraska. Its west boundary line abuts the east boundary line of the state of Colorado. The county terrain consists of arid, low rolling hills. The planar areas are used for agriculture, usually employing center pivot irrigation. The land slopes to the southeast.

The county has an area of 884 square miles (2,290 km^{2}), of which 883 square miles (2,290 km^{2}) is land and 1.1 square miles (2.8 km^{2}) (0.1%) is water.

Most of Nebraska's 93 counties (the eastern 2/3) observe Central Time; the western counties (including Perkins) observe Mountain Time. Perkins County is the easternmost of the Nebraska counties to observe Mountain Time.

=== Major highways ===
- Nebraska Highway 23
- Nebraska Highway 61

=== Adjacent counties ===
- Lincoln County – east (observes Central Time)
- Hayes County – southeast (observes Central Time)
- Chase County – south
- Phillips County, Colorado – southwest
- Sedgwick County, Colorado – west
- Deuel County – northwest
- Keith County – north

== Demographics ==
Historical population
Census	Pop.	Note	%±
1890	4,364		—
1900	1,702		−61.0%
1910	2,570		51.0%
1920	3,967		54.4%
1930	5,834		47.1%
1940	5,197		−10.9%
1950	4,809		−7.5%
1960	4,189		−12.9%
1970	3,423		−18.3%
1980	3,637		6.3%
1990	3,367		−7.4%
2000	3,200		−5.0%
2010	2,970		−7.2%
2020	2,858		−3.8%
2025 (est.)	2,849	▼	−0.3%
US Decennial Census; 1790-1960 1900-1990; 1990-2000 2010 2020 2022

=== 2020 census ===
As of the 2020 census, the county had a population of 2,858. The median age was 42.1 years. 25.5% of residents were under the age of 18 and 23.2% of residents were 65 years of age or older. For every 100 females there were 99.7 males, and for every 100 females age 18 and over there were 98.0 males age 18 and over.

The racial makeup of the county was 93.1% White, 0.3% Black or African American, 0.1% American Indian and Alaska Native, 0.1% Asian, 0.2% Native Hawaiian and Pacific Islander, 2.3% from some other race, and 3.9% from two or more races. Hispanic or Latino residents of any race comprised 5.1% of the population.

0.0% of residents lived in urban areas, while 100.0% lived in rural areas.

There were 1,172 households in the county, of which 29.0% had children under the age of 18 living with them and 20.5% had a female householder with no spouse or partner present. About 29.0% of all households were made up of individuals and 16.1% had someone living alone who was 65 years of age or older.

There were 1,345 housing units, of which 12.9% were vacant. Among occupied housing units, 79.5% were owner-occupied and 20.5% were renter-occupied. The homeowner vacancy rate was 2.0% and the rental vacancy rate was 13.2%.

=== 2000 census ===
As of the 2000 United States census there were 3,200 people, 1,275 households, and 893 families in the county. The population density was 4 people per square mile (1.5 people/km^{2}). There were 1,444 housing units at an average density of 2 units per square mile (0.77/km^{2}). The racial makeup of the county was 97.69% White, 0.03% Black or African American, 0.28% Native American, 0.22% Asian, 1.34% from other races, and 0.44% from two or more races. 2.31% of the population were Hispanic or Latino of any race.

There were 1,275 households, out of which 32.50% had children under the age of 18 living with them, 62.90% were married couples living together, 4.60% had a female householder with no husband present, and 29.90% were non-families. 27.50% of all households were made up of individuals, and 15.70% had someone living alone who was 65 years of age or older. The average household size was 2.47 and the average family size was 3.01.

The county population contained 26.60% under the age of 18, 6.00% from 18 to 24, 23.50% from 25 to 44, 24.70% from 45 to 64, and 19.30% who were 65 years of age or older. The median age was 41 years. For every 100 females there were 100.80 males. For every 100 females age 18 and over, there were 95.80 males.

The median income for a household in the county was $34,205, and the median income for a family was $42,112. Males had a median income of $28,438 versus $19,881 for females. The per capita income for the county was $17,830. About 9.50% of families and 13.60% of the population were below the poverty line, including 20.10% of those under age 18 and 8.90% of those age 65 or over.

== Communities ==
=== City ===
- Grant (county seat)

=== Villages ===
- Elsie
- Madrid
- Venango

=== Unincorporated communities ===
- Brandon
- Grainton

== Politics ==
Like all of rural Nebraska, Perkins County voters are reliably Republican. In no national election since Franklin D. Roosevelt's 1936 landslide has the county selected the Democratic Party candidate, when it gave him 64.4% of the vote over neighboring Kansas governor Alf Landon. As of 2026, Donald Trump's 85.5% of the vote in 2020 remains the highest percentage of the vote for a winning candidate in the county's history.

United States presidential election results for Perkins County, Nebraska
Year	Republican		Democratic		Third party(ies)	
Year	No.	%	No.	%	No.	%
1900	184	43.50%	231	54.61%	8	1.89%
1904	179	54.74%	57	17.43%	91	27.83%
1908	254	48.57%	265	50.67%	4	0.76%
1912	101	17.44%	253	43.70%	225	38.86%
1916	210	32.06%	397	60.61%	48	7.33%
1920	722	61.19%	387	32.80%	71	6.02%
1924	836	50.61%	493	29.84%	323	19.55%
1928	1,461	69.37%	631	29.96%	14	0.66%
1932	674	28.11%	1,669	69.60%	55	2.29%
1936	861	35.00%	1,584	64.39%	15	0.61%
1940	1,413	57.28%	1,054	42.72%	0	0.00%
1944	1,301	61.75%	806	38.25%	0	0.00%
1948	904	51.16%	863	48.84%	0	0.00%
1952	1,637	78.40%	451	21.60%	0	0.00%
1956	1,296	66.06%	666	33.94%	0	0.00%
1960	1,301	65.12%	697	34.88%	0	0.00%
1964	912	50.98%	877	49.02%	0	0.00%
1968	1,165	70.52%	360	21.79%	127	7.69%
1972	1,165	76.70%	354	23.30%	0	0.00%
1976	981	59.49%	622	37.72%	46	2.79%
1980	1,342	76.16%	313	17.76%	107	6.07%
1984	1,420	81.80%	307	17.68%	9	0.52%
1988	1,118	69.70%	468	29.18%	18	1.12%
1992	842	50.54%	300	18.01%	524	31.45%
1996	1,018	66.06%	352	22.84%	171	11.10%
2000	1,170	80.58%	243	16.74%	39	2.69%
2004	1,285	82.48%	262	16.82%	11	0.71%
2008	1,092	76.90%	310	21.83%	18	1.27%
2012	1,135	81.42%	238	17.07%	21	1.51%
2016	1,217	83.64%	161	11.07%	77	5.29%
2020	1,321	85.50%	199	12.88%	25	1.62%
2024	1,224	85.47%	187	13.06%	21	1.47%

== See also ==
- National Register of Historic Places listings in Perkins County NE
