= Elsie, Nebraska =

- Village
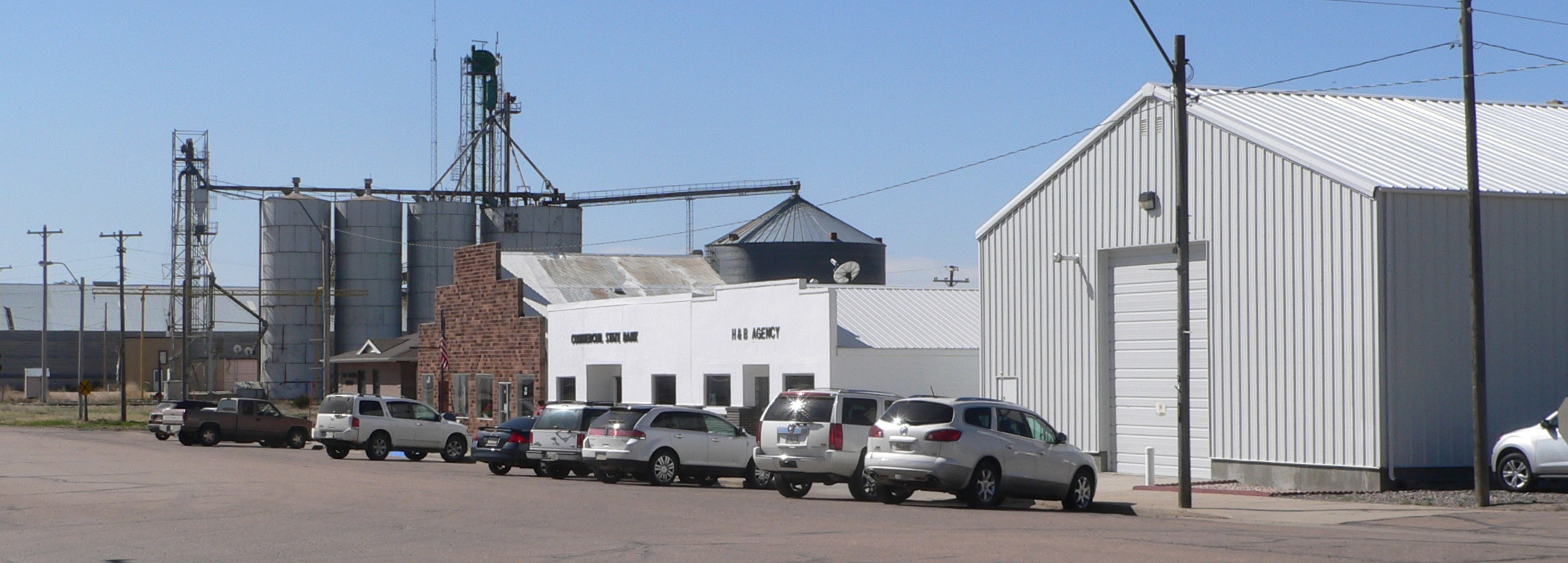
- Downtown Elsie. 2012

- Location of Elsie, Nebraska
- Coordinates: 40°50′50″N 101°23′21″W
- Country: United States
- State: Nebraska
- County: Perkins

Area
  - Total: 0.17 sq mi (0.45 km^{2})
  - Land: 0.17 sq mi (0.45 km^{2})
  - Water: 0 sq mi (0.00 km^{2})
- Elevation: 3,386 ft (1,032 m)

Population (2020)
  - Total: 102
  - Density: 590.4/sq mi (227.96/km^{2})
- Time zone: UTC-7 (Mountain (MST))
  - Summer (DST): UTC-6 (MDT)
- ZIP code: 69134
- Area code: 308
- FIPS code: 31-15500
- GNIS feature ID: 2398820

Elsie is a village in Perkins County, Nebraska, United States. As of the 2020 census, Elsie had a population of 102.

== History ==
Elsie was established in about 1887 when the Chicago, Burlington and Quincy Railroad was extended to that point. Elsie was the name of the daughter of CB&Q president Charles Elliott Perkins. Several of Elsie's streets were given railroad-related names such as Burlington, Chicago, Perkins, and Quincy.

== Geography ==
According to the United States Census Bureau, the village has a total area of 0.17 square miles (0.44 km^{2}), all land.

== Demographics ==
Historical population
Census	Pop.	Note	%±
1920	201		—
1930	262		30.3%
1940	223		−14.9%
1950	219		−1.8%
1960	198		−9.6%
1970	125		−36.9%
1980	133		6.4%
1990	153		15.0%
2000	139		−9.2%
2010	106		−23.7%
2020	102		−3.8%
U.S. Decennial Census

=== 2010 census ===
As of the census of 2010, there were 106 people, 46 households, and 28 families residing in the village. The population density was 623.5 inhabitants per square mile (240.7/km^{2}). There were 64 housing units at an average density of 376.5 per square mile (145.4/km^{2}). The racial makeup of the village was 89.6% White, 9.4% from other races, and 0.9% from two or more races. Hispanic or Latino of any race were 8.5% of the population.

There were 46 households, of which 32.6% had children under the age of 18 living with them, 54.3% were married couples living together, 4.3% had a female householder with no husband present, 2.2% had a male householder with no wife present, and 39.1% were non-families. 37.0% of all households were made up of individuals, and 17.4% had someone living alone who was 65 years of age or older. The average household size was 2.30 and the average family size was 3.11.

The median age in the village was 39.5 years. 29.2% of residents were under the age of 18; 4.8% were between the ages of 18 and 24; 20.7% were from 25 to 44; 33% were from 45 to 64; and 12.3% were 65 years of age or older. The gender makeup of the village was 52.8% male and 47.2% female.

=== 2000 census ===
As of the census of 2000, there were 139 people, 57 households, and 38 families residing in the village. The population density was 809.1 inhabitants per square mile (312.4/km^{2}). There were 69 housing units at an average density of 401.7 per square mile (155.1/km^{2}). The racial makeup of the village was 98.56% White, 0.72% Native American, and 0.72% from two or more races.

There were 57 households, out of which 36.8% had children under the age of 18 living with them, 61.4% were married couples living together, 7.0% had a female householder with no husband present, and 31.6% were non-families. 31.6% of all households were made up of individuals, and 15.8% had someone living alone who was 65 years of age or older. The average household size was 2.44 and the average family size was 3.08.

In the village, the population was spread out, with 29.5% under the age of 18, 6.5% from 18 to 24, 24.5% from 25 to 44, 24.5% from 45 to 64, and 15.1% who were 65 years of age or older. The median age was 40 years. For every 100 females, there were 107.5 males. For every 100 females age 18 and over, there were 88.5 males.

As of 2000 the median income for a household in the village was $43,000, and the median income for a family was $50,625. Males had a median income of $30,750 versus $15,833 for females. The per capita income for the village was $22,813. There were 5.9% of families and 4.7% of the population living below the poverty line, including 5.4% of under eighteens and none of those over 64.
