= Freedom, Nebraska =

Unincorporated community in Nebraska, United States

- Populated place
- Location within Nebraska
- Coordinates: 40°25′28″N 100°22′10″W
- Country: United States
- State: Nebraska
- County: Frontier
- Elevation: 2,671 ft (814 m)
- Time zone: UTC-6 (Central (CST))
  - Summer (DST): UTC-5 (CDT)
- ZIP code: 69022
- Area code: 308
- FIPS code: 31-17600
- GNIS feature ID: 835307

Freedom is an unincorporated community in Frontier County, Nebraska, United States. Freedom is located at 40.4244511°N 100.3693098°W, at an elevation of 2,671 ft (814 m).

== History ==
A post office was established at Freedom in 1895, and operated intermittently until being discontinued in 1946. Freedom was likely named from the patriotic spirit of the post-Civil War era.

A specimen of prehistoric Amebelodon was found in 1928 on a farm at Freedom.
