= Medicine Creek (Republican River tributary) =

Medicine Creek (Medicine River)
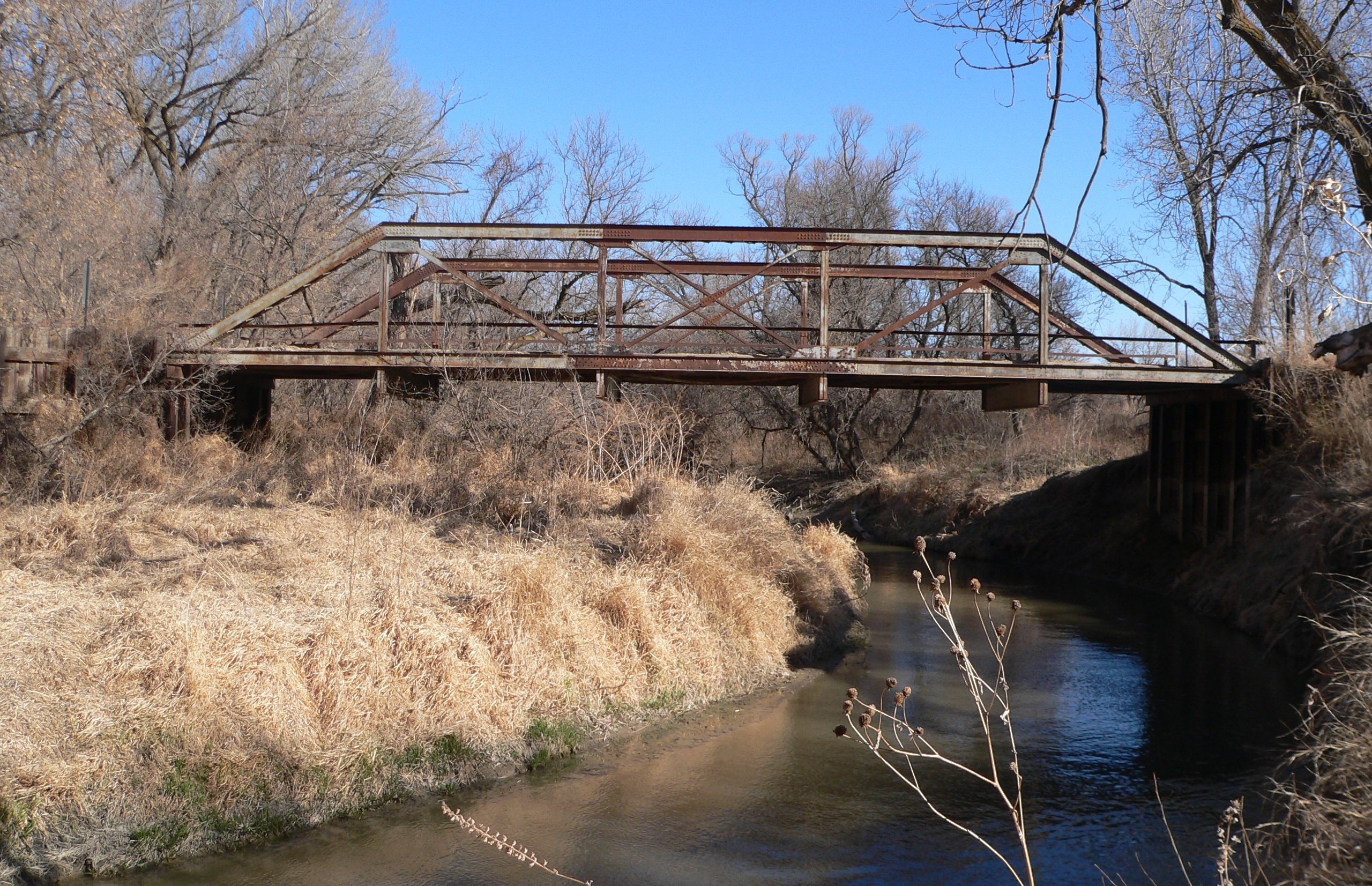
- Medicine Creek above Harry Strunk Reservoir

Location
- Country: United States
- State: Nebraska

Physical characteristics
- Source
  - coordinates: 40°50′20″N 100°53′09″W
- Mouth: Republican River
  - coordinates: 40°16′55″N 100°08′53″W
  - elevation: 684 m (2,244 ft)
- Basin size: 916 mi^{2} (2,370 km^{2})

Basin features
- Official River Code: 10250008

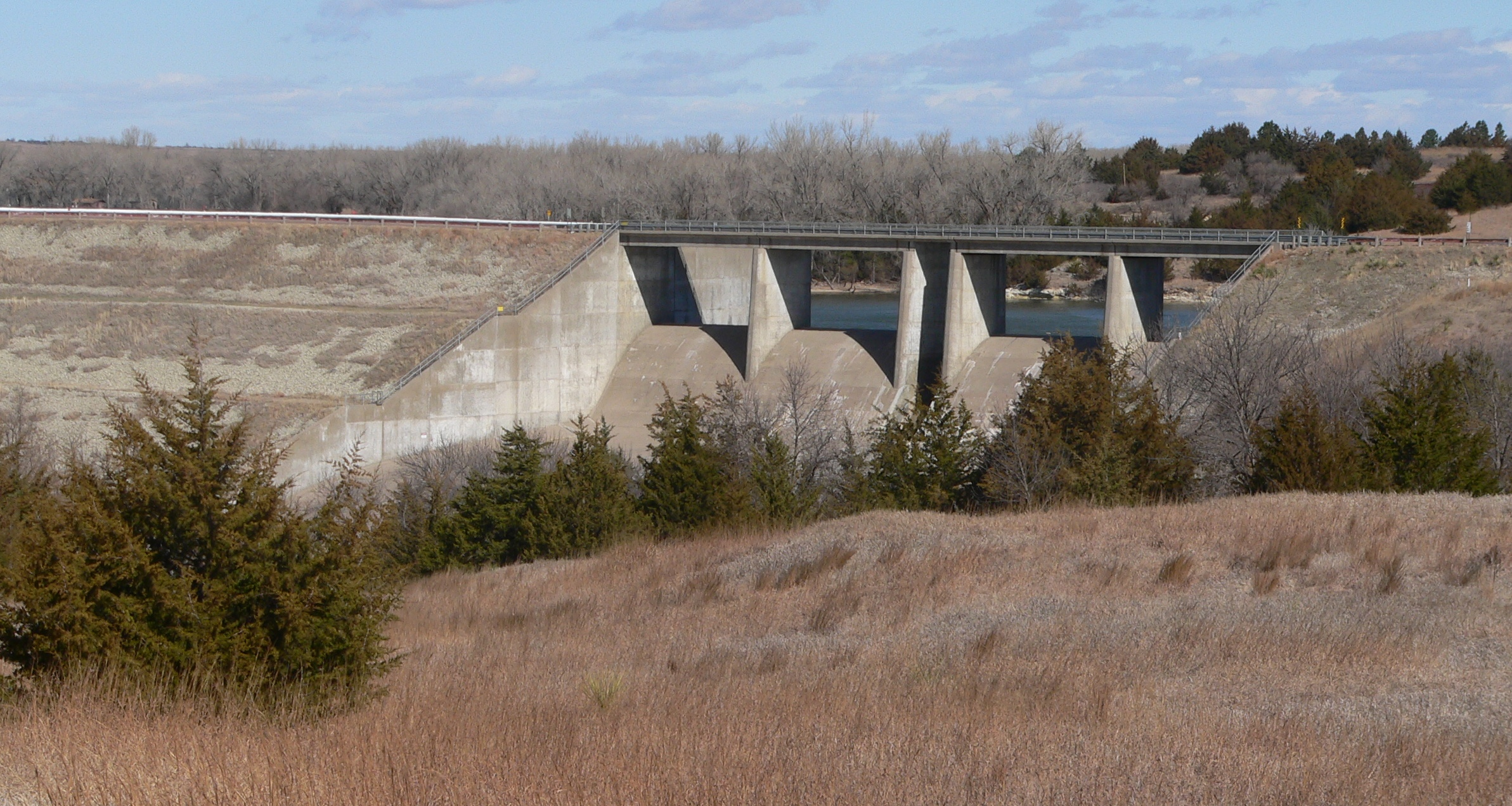
Medicine Creek Dam, constructed in 1949

Medicine Creek is a 96-mile-long (154 km) tributary of the Republican River in Nebraska. Medicine Creek rises in an outlying portion of the Nebraska Sand Hills near the unincorporated community of Somerset in Lincoln County and flows southeast through Frontier County to its confluence with the Republican River .5 miles (0.80 km) east of Cambridge, in Furnas County, Nebraska. About 7 miles (11 km) north of Cambridge, the Medicine Creek Dam impounds the Harry Strunk reservoir, 1,850 acres (750 ha) in area and primarily created for flood-control. A state park and recreational area is located around the dam and lower portion of the reservoir. Medicine Creek is spring fed. Water quality is good and quantity is reliable.

Medicine Creek flows through mixed grass prairies, intermediate between the tallgrass prairie to the east the shortgrass prairie (steppe) to the west. Precipitation is highly variable but averages 50 cm (20 in) per year which is the minimum required for unirrigated agriculture in the Great Plains. Forests are found in the stream bottoms along Medicine Creek and its tributaries. Cambridge, with a population of about 1,000 in 2020, is the largest town in the basin of Medicine Creek.

"Medicine" as a name applied to geographic features is fairly common in the western United States for places associated with Native Americans (Indians). Medicine Creek was a well-watered and wooded corridor between the Republican and Platte Rivers dating from pre-historic times. A band of Oglala Dakota called the Cut-off Oglala took up residence near Stockville in 1870. In the same year white cattlemen began to settle near the creek. In fall 1872, the Oglala chief Whistler and two more Oglala were murdered, probably by white bison hunters, and in 1873-1874 the Oglala departed the valley to reside on a reservation.

== Archaeology ==
A 12 mi (19 km) portion of Medicine Creek around the reservoir and extending up Lime Creek, a tributary, has been an area of extensive archaeological research since the 1920s. Findings include fossils of extinct mammoths, evidence of Clovis Culture and pre-Clovis Paleo-Indians, and many sites associated with the prehistoric Plains Village period from roughly 1000 to 1450 CE. The Mowry Bluff Archeological Site, is located below the dam and is listed in the National Register of Historic Places.

== See also ==
- List of rivers of Nebraska
