= Bloom, Kansas =

Unincorporated community in Ford County, Kansas

- Unincorporated community
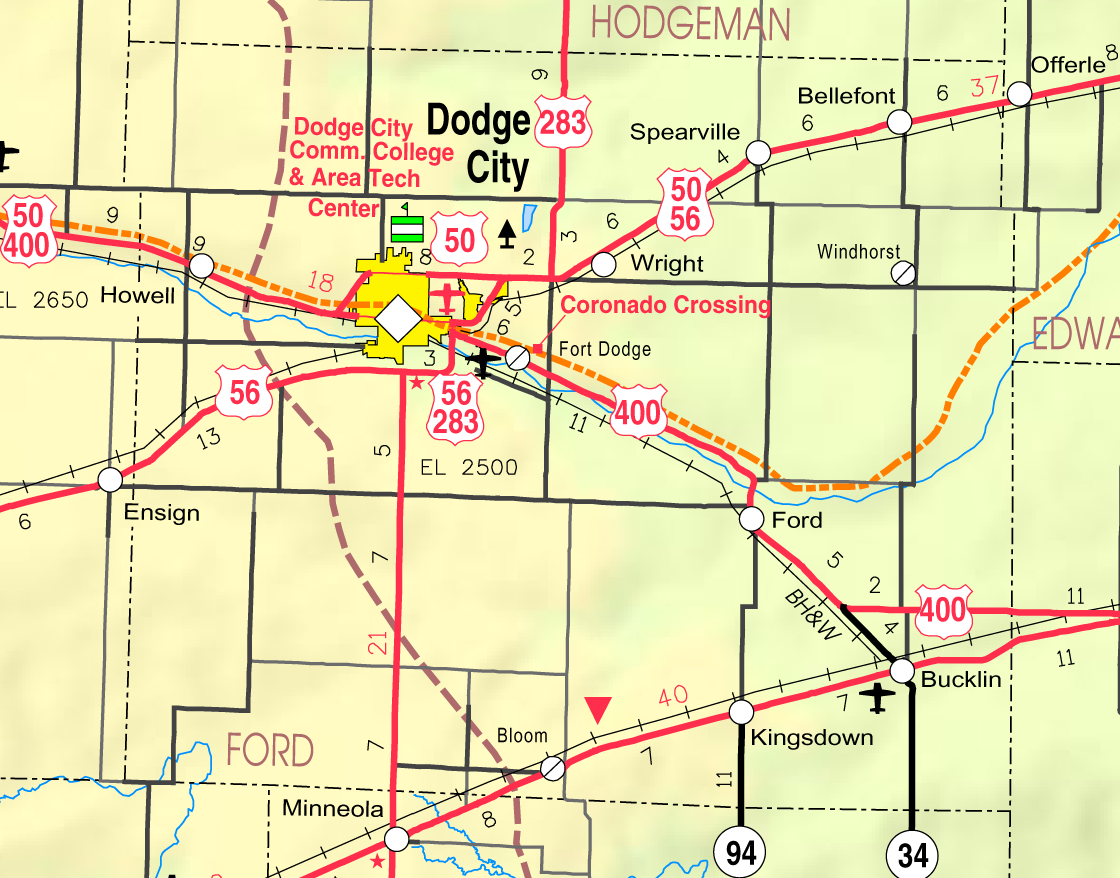
- KDOT map of Ford County (legend)

- Location within Kansas Location within the United States
- Coordinates: 37°29′11″N 99°53′46″W
- Country: United States
- State: Kansas
- County: Ford
- Founded: 1880s
- Named for: Bloomsburg, Pennsylvania
- Elevation: 2,585 ft (788 m)
- Time zone: UTC-6 (CST)
  - Summer (DST): UTC-5 (CDT)
- Area code: 620
- FIPS code: 20-07350
- GNIS ID: 470693

Bloom is an unincorporated community in Ford County, Kansas, United States. Its post office closed in 1992. At a 2018 estimate, the community had a population of 94. It is located along U.S. Route 54 highway.

== History ==
Bloom was established by Thomas J. Vanderslice and Samuel O. Albright in 1887 or 1888. Vanderslice named it Bloom after his hometown of Bloomsburg, Pennsylvania. The small town sprang to life when the Rock Island Railroad pushed west. The town's original train depot can still be found in Bloom.

Bloom's population reached a few hundred in the 1930s but gradually declined thereafter and is now less than 50.

The small town once had a hotel, gas station, restaurant, post office, and lumber yard. Today, only a grain elevator business and private residences remain. Wheat farms and ranches surround the small town.

== Demographics ==
At a 2018 estimate, Bloom, Kansas has a population of 94. The same estimate also found that there were 37 households, with there being an average of 2.5 people per household. The median age is estimated to be at 35.8. The per capita income is estimated to be around $44,295, with about 4.3% of residents below the poverty line.

== Education ==
Bloom High School closed in 1964 when the town's school district merged with that of Minneola.
