= Oconto, Nebraska =

- Village
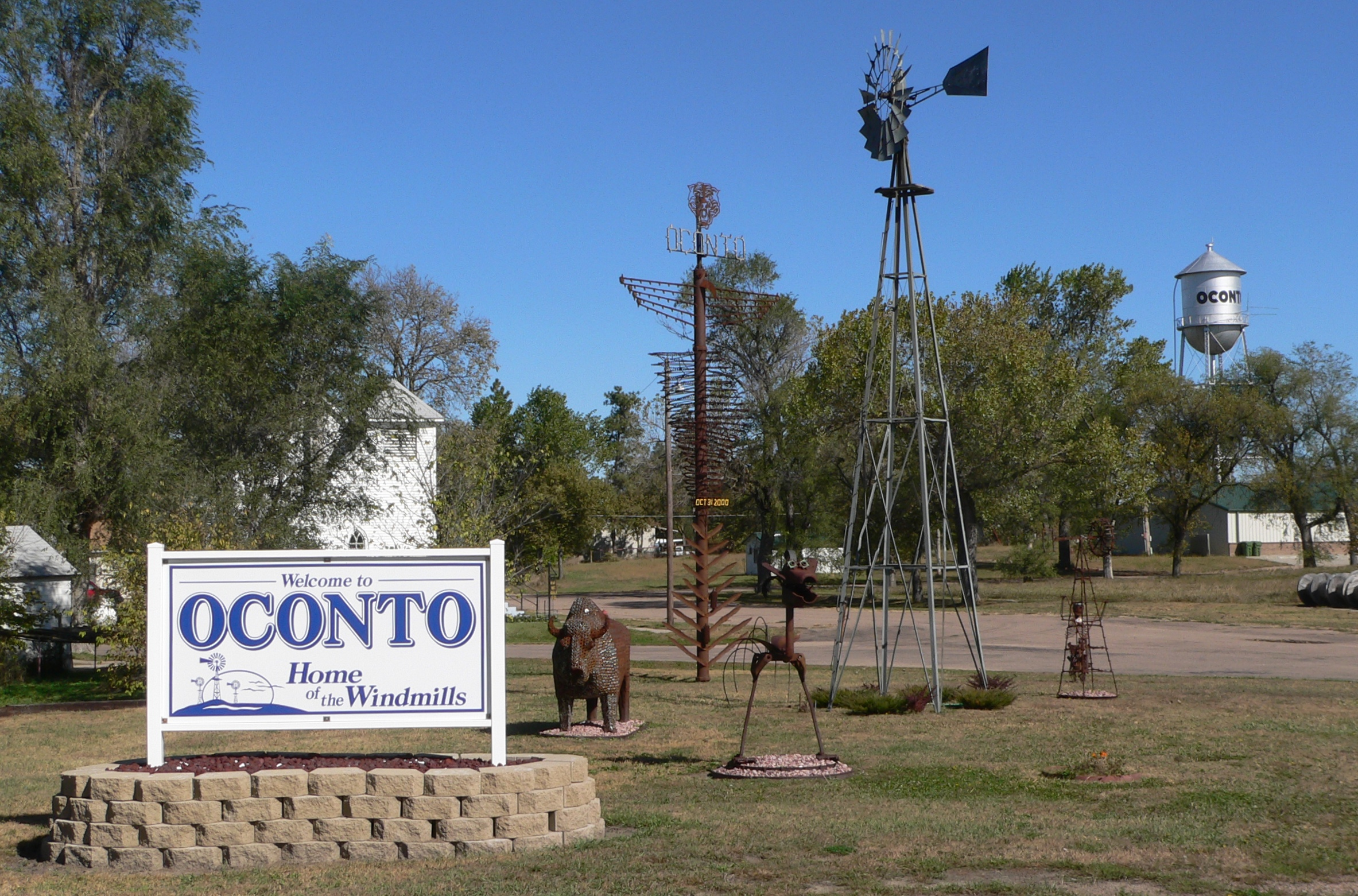
- Welcome sign, windmill, sculptures (2010)

- Location within Custer County and Nebraska

- Location within Nebraska Location within the United States
- Coordinates: 41°08′30″N 99°45′43″W
- Country: United States
- State: Nebraska
- County: Custer
- Township: Wood River
- Founded: 1887
- Incorporated: 1906

Area
  - Total: 0.20 sq mi (0.53 km^{2})
  - Land: 0.20 sq mi (0.53 km^{2})
  - Water: 0 sq mi (0.00 km^{2})
- Elevation: 2,566 ft (782 m)

Population (2020)
  - Total: 138
  - Density: 679.4/sq mi (262.33/km^{2})
- Time zone: UTC-6 (Central (CST))
  - Summer (DST): UTC-5 (CDT)
- ZIP code: 68860
- Area code: 308
- FIPS code: 31-35665
- GNIS ID: 2399555
- Website: villageofoconto.com

Oconto is a village in Custer County, Nebraska, United States. As of the 2020 census, Oconto had a population of 138.

== History ==
The community was founded in 1887 as Olax, but the original name conflicted with another Nebraska location, so it was renamed to Oconto. The exact source of the name has been debated, some hold Oconto was the name of a pioneer settler, while others believe the town was named after Oconto, Wisconsin. Oconto was incorporated in 1906.

On October 31, 2000, a tornado hit Oconto. It destroyed the community center and several downtown businesses, and damaged 40 homes. A Halloween party was being held at the community center when advanced warning allowed them to seek shelter in the basement, all 19 children and 4 adults came out without a scratch. In 2003, a new community center was constructed using funds from federal, state, county, local sources.

On August 21, 2017, Oconto was a viewing location under the path of a total solar eclipse. Hundreds of people gathered in Oconto to view the eclipse, including tourists from other states.

== Geography ==
According to the United States Census Bureau, the village has a total area of 0.20 square miles (0.52 km^{2}), all land.

Oconto is located at the junction of Nebraska state highways 21 and 40. It is south of the Pressey Wildlife Management area.

== Demographics ==
Historical population
Census	Pop.	Note	%±
1910	245		—
1920	272		11.0%
1930	243		−10.7%
1940	260		7.0%
1950	258		−0.8%
1960	219		−15.1%
1970	155		−29.2%
1980	176		13.5%
1990	147		−16.5%
2000	141		−4.1%
2010	151		7.1%
2020	138		−8.6%
U.S. Decennial Census

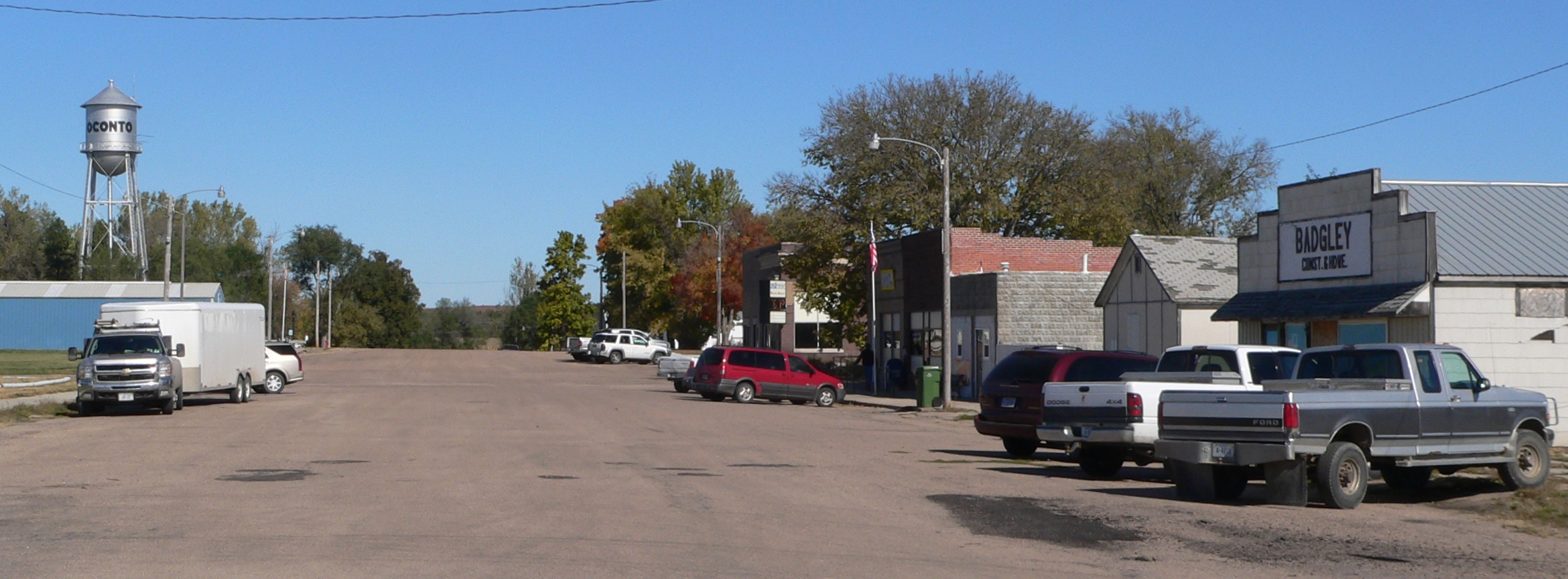
Downtown Oconto (2010)

=== 2010 census ===
As of the census of 2010, there were 151 people, 68 households, and 40 families living in the village. The population density was 755.0 inhabitants per square mile (291.5/km^{2}). There were 82 housing units at an average density of 410.0 per square mile (158.3/km^{2}). The racial makeup of the village was 96.0% White, 0.7% from other races, and 3.3% from two or more races. Hispanic or Latino of any race were 4.0% of the population.

There were 68 households, of which 27.9% had children under the age of 18 living with them, 44.1% were married couples living together, 8.8% had a female householder with no husband present, 5.9% had a male householder with no wife present, and 41.2% were non-families. 30.9% of all households were made up of individuals, and 14.7% had someone living alone who was 65 years of age or older. The average household size was 2.22 and the average family size was 2.85.

The median age in the village was 44.3 years. 21.9% of residents were under the age of 18; 6% were between the ages of 18 and 24; 23.2% were from 25 to 44; 28.5% were from 45 to 64; and 20.5% were 65 years of age or older. The gender makeup of the village was 51.0% male and 49.0% female.

=== 2000 census ===
As of the census of 2000, there were 141 people, 65 households, and 39 families living in the village. The population density was 687.5 inhabitants per square mile (265.4/km^{2}). There were 79 housing units at an average density of 385.2 per square mile (148.7/km^{2}). The racial makeup of the village was 100.00% White. Hispanic or Latino of any race were 3.55% of the population.

There were 65 households, out of which 27.7% had children under the age of 18 living with them, 52.3% were married couples living together, 4.6% had a female householder with no husband present, and 38.5% were non-families. 35.4% of all households were made up of individuals, and 13.8% had someone living alone who was 65 years of age or older. The average household size was 2.17 and the average family size was 2.80.

In the village, the population was spread out, with 24.1% under the age of 18, 5.7% from 18 to 24, 27.7% from 25 to 44, 21.3% from 45 to 64, and 21.3% who were 65 years of age or older. The median age was 38 years. For every 100 females, there were 113.6 males. For every 100 females age 18 and over, there were 114.0 males.

As of 2000 the median income for a household in the village was $23,125, and the median income for a family was $34,167. Males had a median income of $24,583 versus $16,875 for females. The per capita income for the village was $13,377. There were 16.7% of families and 17.5% of the population living below the poverty line, including 21.1% of under eighteens and 12.0% of those over 64.
