= Eustis, Nebraska =

Village in Frontier County, Nebraska, United States

- Village
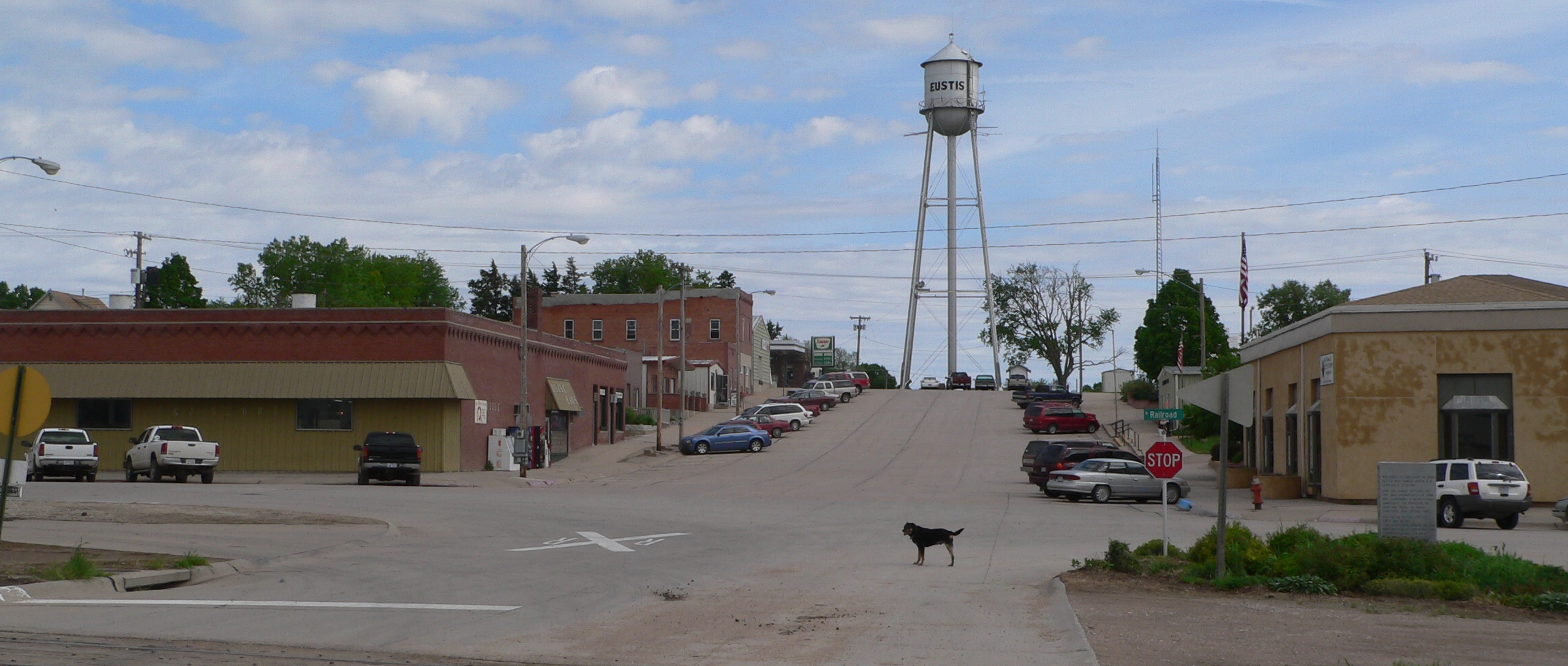
- Downtown Eustis: Main Street, looking north from South Railroad Street

- Location of Eustis, Nebraska
- Coordinates: 40°39′52″N 100°01′46″W
- Country: United States
- State: Nebraska
- County: Frontier

Area
  - Total: 0.42 sq mi (1.10 km^{2})
  - Land: 0.42 sq mi (1.10 km^{2})
  - Water: 0 sq mi (0.00 km^{2})
- Elevation: 2,644 ft (806 m)

Population (2020)
  - Total: 389
  - Density: 919.9/sq mi (355.17/km^{2})
- Time zone: UTC-6 (Central (CST))
  - Summer (DST): UTC-5 (CDT)
- ZIP code: 69028
- Area code: 308
- FIPS code: 31-16165
- GNIS feature ID: 2398843
- Website: https://www.eustisnebraska.org/

Eustis is a village in Frontier County, Nebraska, United States. As of the 2020 census, Eustis had a population of 389.

== History ==
Eustis got its start in the year 1886, following construction of the railroad through the territory. It was named for Percy Sprague Eustis, a railroad official. Eustis was incorporated as a village in 1888.

== Geography ==
According to the United States Census Bureau, the village has a total area of 0.42 square miles (1.09 km^{2}), all land.

== Demographics ==
Historical population
| Census | Pop. | Note | %± |
|---|---|---|---|
| 1890 | 145 | | — |
| 1900 | 232 | | 60.0% |
| 1910 | 403 | | 73.7% |
| 1920 | 434 | | 7.7% |
| 1930 | 497 | | 14.5% |
| 1940 | 459 | | −7.6% |
| 1950 | 413 | | −10.0% |
| 1960 | 386 | | −6.5% |
| 1970 | 400 | | 3.6% |
| 1980 | 460 | | 15.0% |
| 1990 | 452 | | −1.7% |
| 2000 | 464 | | 2.7% |
| 2010 | 401 | | −13.6% |
| 2020 | 389 | | −3.0% |
U.S. Decennial Census

=== 2010 census ===
As of the census of 2010, there were 401 people, 180 households, and 118 families residing in the village. The population density was 954.8 inhabitants per square mile (368.7/km^{2}). There were 205 housing units at an average density of 488.1 per square mile (188.5/km^{2}). The racial makeup of the village was 98.5% White, 0.5% Asian, 0.2% from other races, and 0.7% from two or more races. Hispanic or Latino of any race were 1.2% of the population.

There were 180 households, of which 28.3% had children under the age of 18 living with them, 56.1% were married couples living together, 6.1% had a female householder with no husband present, 3.3% had a male householder with no wife present, and 34.4% were non-families. 31.1% of all households were made up of individuals, and 11.7% had someone living alone who was 65 years of age or older. The average household size was 2.23 and the average family size was 2.75.

The median age in the village was 47.8 years. 23.7% of residents were under the age of 18; 5.5% were between the ages of 18 and 24; 18% were from 25 to 44; 32% were from 45 to 64; and 20.9% were 65 years of age or older. The gender makeup of the village was 50.1% male and 49.9% female.

=== 2000 census ===
As of the census of 2000, there were 464 people, 187 households, and 126 families residing in the village. The population density was 1,150.1 inhabitants per square mile (444.1/km^{2}). There were 210 housing units at an average density of 520.5 per square mile (201.0/km^{2}). The racial makeup of the village was 98.92% White, 0.22% Native American, 0.22% Asian, and 0.65% from two or more races. Hispanic or Latino of any race were 1.08% of the population.

There were 187 households, out of which 34.2% had children under the age of 18 living with them, 57.8% were married couples living together, 6.4% had a female householder with no husband present, and 32.6% were non-families. 31.6% of all households were made up of individuals, and 16.0% had someone living alone who was 65 years of age or older. The average household size was 2.48 and the average family size was 3.16.

In the village, the population was spread out, with 30.8% under the age of 18, 6.0% from 18 to 24, 26.9% from 25 to 44, 19.4% from 45 to 64, and 16.8% who were 65 years of age or older. The median age was 39 years. For every 100 females, there were 95.0 males. For every 100 females age 18 and over, there were 89.9 males.

As of 2000 the median income for a household in the village was $34,205, and the median income for a family was $41,750. Males had a median income of $29,583 versus $17,321 for females. The per capita income for the village was $16,618. About 5.2% of families and 7.1% of the population were below the poverty line, including 5.8% of those under age 18 and 13.4% of those age 65 or over.

== Education ==
It is in the Eustis-Farnam Public Schools school district.

== Notable people ==
- Clayton Keith Yeutter - United States Secretary of Agriculture (1989–1991).
- Ralph G. Brooks - 29th governor of Nebraska.

== See also ==
- List of municipalities in Nebraska
