= Venango, Nebraska =

- Village
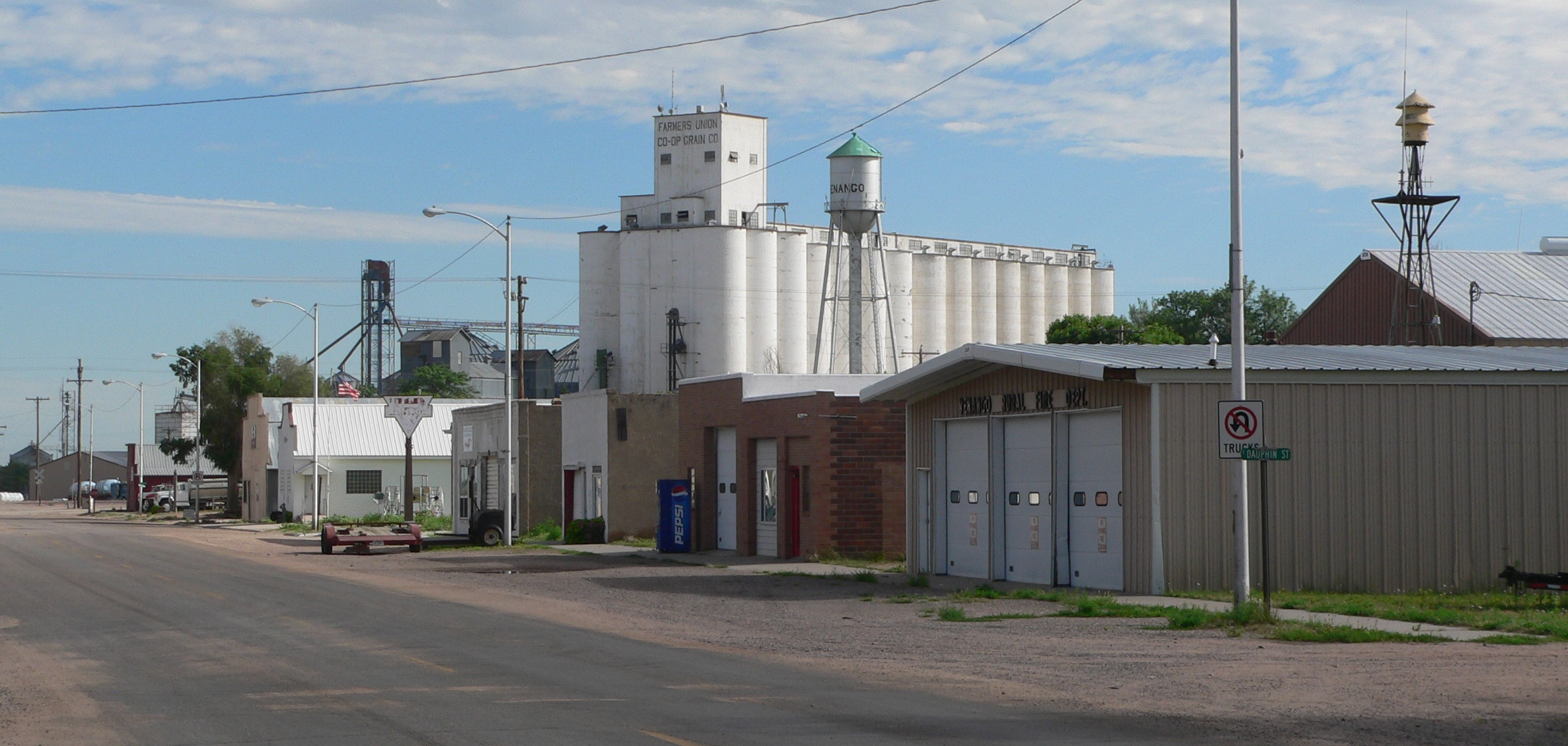
- Downtown Venango: Pennsylvania Avenue

- Location of Venango, Nebraska
- Coordinates: 40°45′49″N 102°02′39″W
- Country: United States
- State: Nebraska
- County: Perkins

Area
  - Total: 0.76 sq mi (1.96 km^{2})
  - Land: 0.76 sq mi (1.96 km^{2})
  - Water: 0 sq mi (0.00 km^{2})
- Elevation: 3,593 ft (1,095 m)

Population (2020)
  - Total: 157
  - Density: 207.3/sq mi (80.03/km^{2})
- Time zone: UTC-7 (Mountain (MST))
  - Summer (DST): UTC-6 (MDT)
- ZIP code: 69168
- Area code: 308
- FIPS code: 31-50230
- GNIS feature ID: 2400051

Venango is a village in Perkins County, Nebraska, United States. The population was 157 at the 2020 U.S. census.

== History ==
Venango was platted in 1887 when the railroad was extended to that point. It was likely named after Venango County, Pennsylvania.

== Geography ==
According to the United States Census Bureau, the village has a total area of 0.25 square miles (0.65 km^{2}), all land.

== Demographics ==
Historical population
Census	Pop.	Note	%±
1920	285		—
1930	286		0.4%
1940	214		−25.2%
1950	233		8.9%
1960	227		−2.6%
1970	218		−4.0%
1980	230		5.5%
1990	192		−16.5%
2000	175		−8.9%
2010	164		−6.3%
2020	157		−4.3%
U.S. Decennial Census; 2020

=== 2010 census ===
As of the census of 2010, there were 164 people, 74 households, and 52 families residing in the village. The population density was 656.0 inhabitants per square mile (253.3/km^{2}). There were 89 housing units at an average density of 356.0 per square mile (137.5/km^{2}). The racial makeup of the village was 93.3% White, 0.6% Native American, and 6.1% from other races. Hispanic or Latino of any race were 9.8% of the population.

There were 74 households, of which 20.3% had children under the age of 18 living with them, 62.2% were married couples living together, 4.1% had a female householder with no husband present, 4.1% had a male householder with no wife present, and 29.7% were non-families. 25.7% of all households were made up of individuals, and 10.9% had someone living alone who was 65 years of age or older. The average household size was 2.22 and the average family size was 2.54.

The median age in the village was 49.7 years. 17.7% of residents were under the age of 18; 8.5% were between the ages of 18 and 24; 16.4% were from 25 to 44; 32.9% were from 45 to 64; and 24.4% were 65 years of age or older. The gender makeup of the village was 51.2% male and 48.8% female.

=== 2000 census ===
As of the census of 2000, there were 175 people, 68 households, and 51 families residing in the village. The population density was 706.8 inhabitants per square mile (272.9/km^{2}). There were 85 housing units at an average density of 343.3 per square mile (132.5/km^{2}). The racial makeup of the village was 94.86% White, 5.14% from other races. Hispanic or Latino of any race were 10.29% of the population.

There were 68 households, out of which 29.4% had children under the age of 18 living with them, 69.1% were married couples living together, 4.4% had a female householder with no husband present, and 25.0% were non-families. 22.1% of all households were made up of individuals, and 8.8% had someone living alone who was 65 years of age or older. The average household size was 2.57 and the average family size was 3.00.

In the village, the population was spread out, with 28.0% under the age of 18, 5.7% from 18 to 24, 21.1% from 25 to 44, 33.7% from 45 to 64, and 11.4% who were 65 years of age or older. The median age was 40 years. For every 100 females, there were 105.9 males. For every 100 females age 18 and over, there were 93.8 males.

As of 2000 the median income for a household in the village was $24,444, and the median income for a family was $29,688. Males had a median income of $23,125 versus $18,750 for females. The per capita income for the village was $12,281. About 15.7% of families and 21.8% of the population were below the poverty line, including 30.2% of those under the age of eighteen and 8.0% of those 65 or over.
