= Frontier County, Nebraska =

County in Nebraska, United States

- County
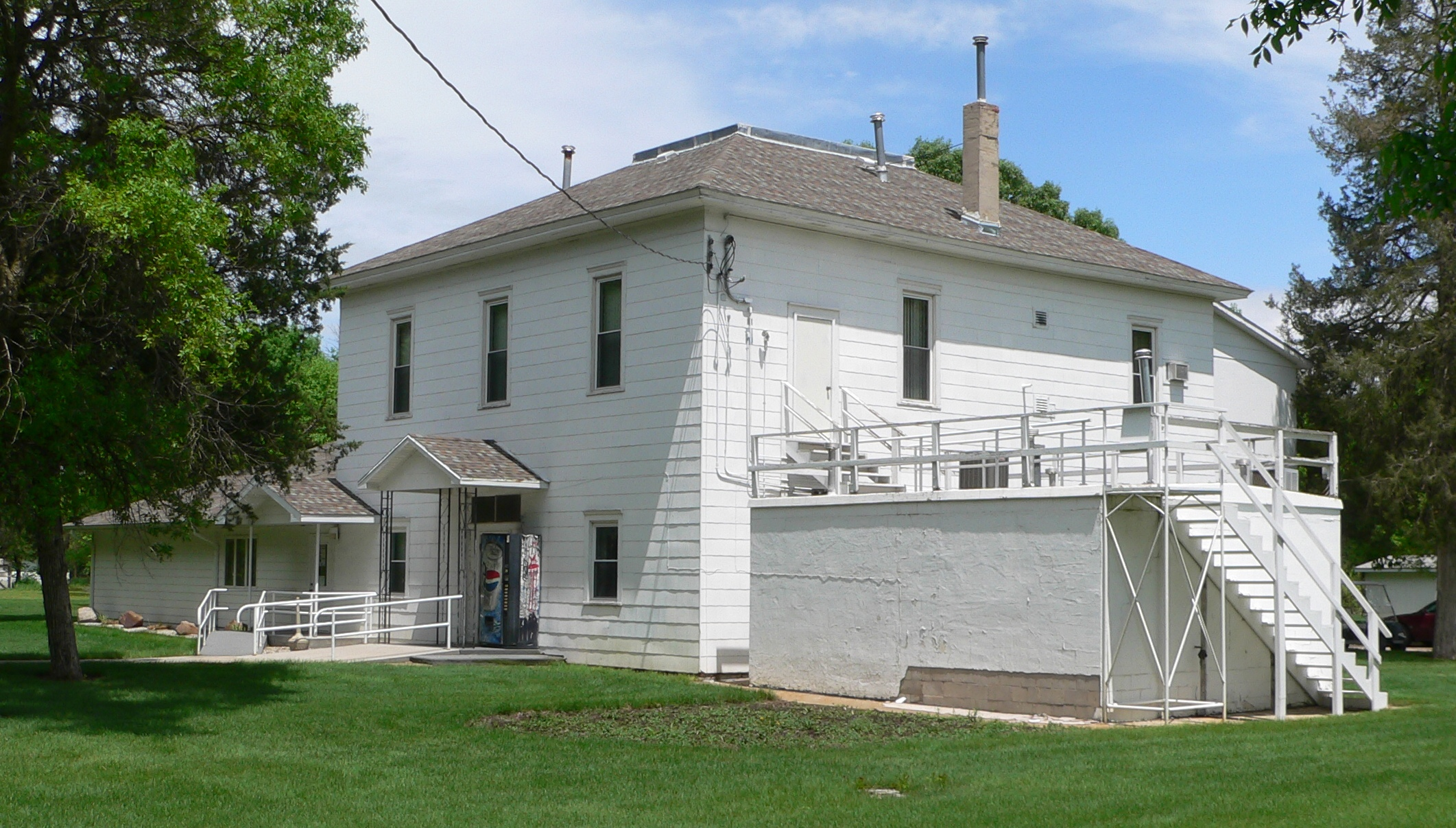
- Frontier County Courthouse in Stockville

- Location within the U.S. state of Nebraska
- Coordinates: 40°32′N 100°23′W
- Country: United States
- State: Nebraska
- Founded: 1872
- Seat: Stockville
- Largest city: Curtis

Area
  - Total: 980 sq mi (2,500 km^{2})
  - Land: 975 sq mi (2,530 km^{2})
  - Water: 5.5 sq mi (14 km^{2}) 0.6%

Population (2020)
  - Total: 2,519
  - Estimate (2025): 2,655 ▲
  - Density: 2.58/sq mi (0.998/km^{2})
- Time zone: UTC−6 (Central)
  - Summer (DST): UTC−5 (CDT)
- Congressional district: 3rd
- Website: frontiercounty.ne.gov

Frontier County is a county in the U.S. state of Nebraska. As of the 2020 United States census, the population was 2,519. Its county seat is Stockville.

In the Nebraska license plate system, Frontier County is represented by the prefix 60 (it had the sixtieth-largest number of vehicles registered in the county when the license plate system was established in 1922). However, Frontier County has only been a frontier county by the United States Census Bureau's definition (fewer than 6 people per square mile) since approximately 1950.

== History ==
Frontier County was formed in 1872. It was named for its location along the frontier border in the late 19th century.

The courthouse was completed in 1889.

== Geography ==
According to the US Census Bureau, the county has an area of 980 square miles (2,500 km^{2}), of which 975 square miles (2,530 km^{2}) is land and 5.5 square miles (14 km^{2}) (0.6%) is water.

=== Major highways ===
- U.S. Highway 83
- Nebraska Highway 18
- Nebraska Highway 21
- Nebraska Highway 23

=== Adjacent counties ===
- Gosper County – east
- Furnas County –southeast
- Red Willow County – south
- Hitchcock County – southwest
- Hayes County – west
- Lincoln County – north
- Dawson County – northeast

=== Protected areas ===
- Hugh Butler Lake / Red Willow Reservoir State Wildlife Management Area (part)
- Medicine Creek Reservoir State Recreation Area

== Demographics ==
Historical population
Census	Pop.	Note	%±
1880	934		—
1890	8,497		809.7%
1900	8,781		3.3%
1910	8,572		−2.4%
1920	8,540		−0.4%
1930	8,114		−5.0%
1940	6,417		−20.9%
1950	5,282		−17.7%
1960	4,311		−18.4%
1970	3,982		−7.6%
1980	3,647		−8.4%
1990	3,101		−15.0%
2000	3,099		−0.1%
2010	2,756		−11.1%
2020	2,519		−8.6%
2025 (est.)	2,655	▲	5.4%
US Decennial Census; 1790-1960 1900-1990; 1990-2000 2010

=== 2020 census ===
As of the 2020 census, the county had a population of 2,519. The median age was 43.8 years. 21.4% of residents were under the age of 18 and 22.7% of residents were 65 years of age or older. For every 100 females there were 106.0 males, and for every 100 females age 18 and over there were 100.1 males age 18 and over.

The racial makeup of the county was 94.3% White, 0.7% Black or African American, 0.2% American Indian and Alaska Native, 0.0% Asian, 0.1% Native Hawaiian and Pacific Islander, 1.2% from some other race, and 3.5% from two or more races. Hispanic or Latino residents of any race comprised 3.2% of the population.

0.0% of residents lived in urban areas, while 100.0% lived in rural areas.

There were 1,048 households in the county, of which 23.5% had children under the age of 18 living with them and 19.8% had a female householder with no spouse or partner present. About 30.7% of all households were made up of individuals and 15.9% had someone living alone who was 65 years of age or older.

There were 1,395 housing units, of which 24.9% were vacant. Among occupied housing units, 71.9% were owner-occupied and 28.1% were renter-occupied. The homeowner vacancy rate was 2.2% and the rental vacancy rate was 14.1%.

=== 2000 census ===
As of the 2000 United States census, there were 3,099 people, 1,192 households, and 828 families in the county. The population density was 3 people per square mile (1.2 people/km^{2}). There were 1,543 housing units at an average density of 2 units per square mile (0.77/km^{2}).

The racial makeup of the county was 98.29% White, 0.10% Black or African American, 0.26% Native American, 0.26% Asian, 0.39% from other races, and 0.71% from two or more races. 0.97% of the population were Hispanic or Latino of any race. 45.8% were of German, 12.8% English, 6.3% American and 6.1% Irish ancestry.

There were 1,192 households, out of which 31.40% had children under the age of 18 living with them, 62.50% were married couples living together, 4.80% had a female householder with no husband present, and 30.50% were non-families. 26.30% of all households were made up of individuals, and 12.30% had someone living alone who was 65 years of age or older. The average household size was 2.48 and the average family size was 3.02.

The county population contained 26.00% under the age of 18, 11.30% from 18 to 24, 22.80% from 25 to 44, 23.00% from 45 to 64, and 16.90% who were 65 years of age or older. The median age was 38 years. For every 100 females there were 100.50 males. For every 100 females age 18 and over, there were 98.50 males.

The median income for a household in the county was $33,038, and the median income for a family was $38,664. Males had a median income of $25,792 versus $16,941 for females. The per capita income for the county was $16,648. About 9.30% of families and 12.20% of the population were below the poverty line, including 9.90% of those under age 18 and 8.30% of those age 65 or over.

== Communities ==
=== City ===
- Curtis

=== Villages ===
- Eustis
- Maywood
- Moorefield
- Stockville (county seat)

=== Unincorporated communities ===
- Freedom
- Orafino
- Quick

== Politics ==
Frontier County voters are strongly Republican. In no national election since 1936 has the county selected the Democratic Party candidate (as of 2024). The polarization has increased in recent years with Republican candidate Donald Trump winning 85.8% of the vote in 2024, a record in the county.

United States presidential election results for Frontier County, Nebraska
Year	Republican		Democratic		Third party(ies)	
Year	No.	%	No.	%	No.	%
1900	930	51.96%	810	45.25%	50	2.79%
1904	993	61.64%	190	11.79%	428	26.57%
1908	1,098	53.46%	847	41.24%	109	5.31%
1912	293	17.38%	657	38.97%	736	43.65%
1916	736	37.28%	1,138	57.65%	100	5.07%
1920	1,750	68.09%	673	26.19%	147	5.72%
1924	1,497	52.27%	599	20.91%	768	26.82%
1928	2,335	71.76%	879	27.01%	40	1.23%
1932	1,353	37.64%	2,188	60.86%	54	1.50%
1936	1,576	44.91%	1,883	53.66%	50	1.42%
1940	2,069	66.08%	1,062	33.92%	0	0.00%
1944	1,855	70.99%	758	29.01%	0	0.00%
1948	1,307	60.71%	846	39.29%	0	0.00%
1952	1,980	77.07%	589	22.93%	0	0.00%
1956	1,602	71.65%	634	28.35%	0	0.00%
1960	1,615	73.51%	582	26.49%	0	0.00%
1964	1,090	56.45%	841	43.55%	0	0.00%
1968	1,183	70.21%	345	20.47%	157	9.32%
1972	1,315	80.23%	324	19.77%	0	0.00%
1976	994	60.80%	588	35.96%	53	3.24%
1980	1,346	79.27%	259	15.25%	93	5.48%
1984	1,351	83.55%	258	15.96%	8	0.49%
1988	1,057	72.45%	384	26.32%	18	1.23%
1992	785	49.97%	302	19.22%	484	30.81%
1996	901	64.96%	310	22.35%	176	12.69%
2000	1,102	79.11%	244	17.52%	47	3.37%
2004	1,160	79.07%	275	18.75%	32	2.18%
2008	1,034	73.65%	349	24.86%	21	1.50%
2012	1,007	77.16%	271	20.77%	27	2.07%
2016	1,110	83.58%	161	12.12%	57	4.29%
2020	1,229	84.99%	189	13.07%	28	1.94%
2024	1,213	85.85%	185	13.09%	15	1.06%

== Education ==
School districts include:

- Arapahoe Public Schools
- Cambridge Public Schools
- Elwood Public Schools
- Eustis-Farnam Public Schools
- Hayes Center Public Schools
- Maywood Public Schools
- McCook Public Schools
- Medicine Valley Public Schools
- Southwest Public Schools

== See also ==
- Medicine Creek (Republican River tributary)
- Mowry Bluff Archeological Site
- National Register of Historic Places listings in Frontier County, Nebraska
