= Stockville, Nebraska =

Village in and county seat of Frontier County, Nebraska, United States

- Village
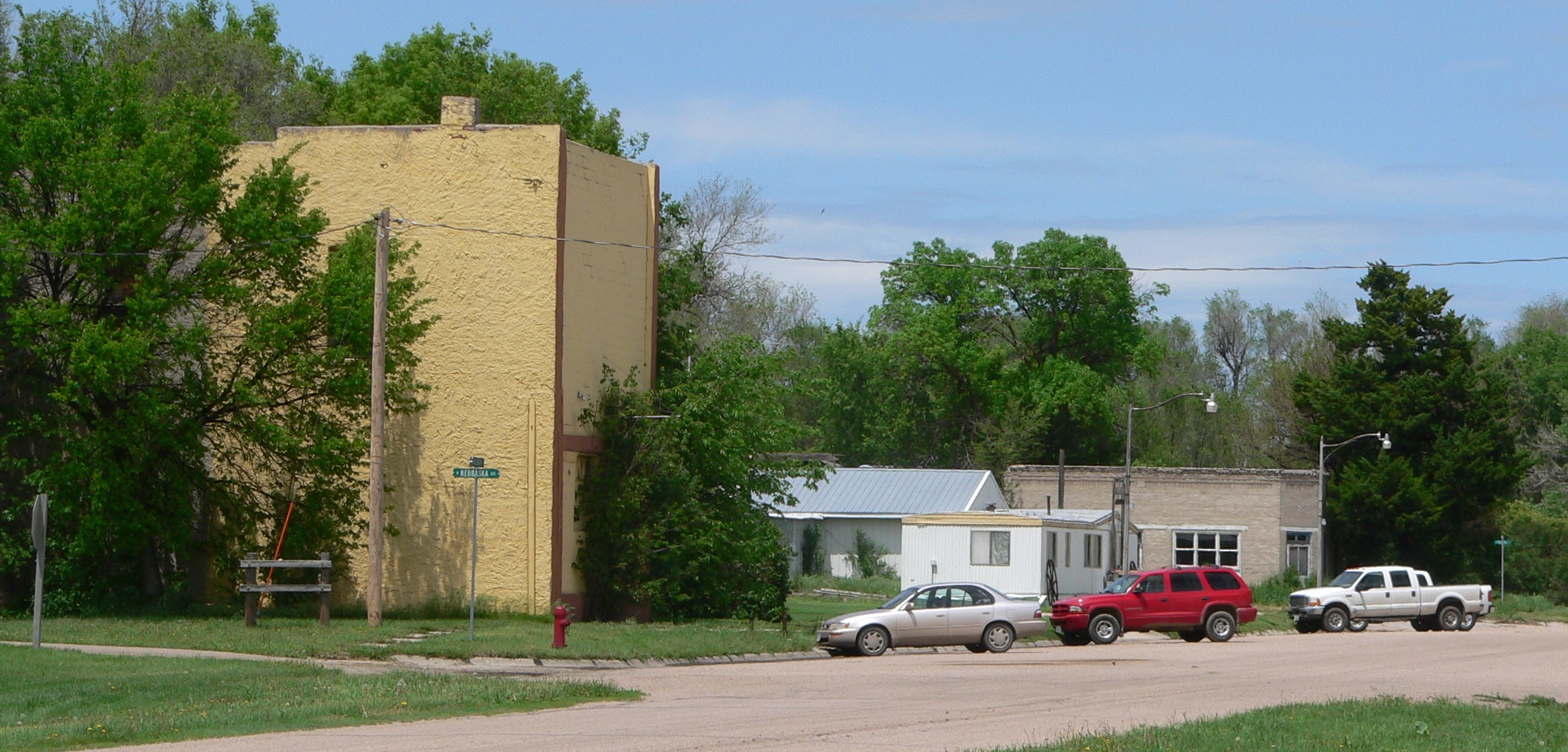
- Downtown Stockville: west side of Wellington Street, May 2010

- Location of Stockville, Nebraska
- Coordinates: 40°32′01″N 100°23′04″W
- Country: United States
- State: Nebraska
- County: Frontier

Area
  - Total: 0.26 sq mi (0.68 km^{2})
  - Land: 0.26 sq mi (0.68 km^{2})
  - Water: 0 sq mi (0.00 km^{2})
- Elevation: 2,484 ft (757 m)

Population (2020)
  - Total: 25
  - Density: 95.3/sq mi (36.81/km^{2})
- Time zone: UTC-6 (Central (CST))
  - Summer (DST): UTC-5 (CDT)
- ZIP code: 69042
- Area code: 308
- FIPS code: 31-47290
- GNIS feature ID: 2399906

Stockville is a village in Frontier County, Nebraska, United States. It is the county seat of Frontier County. As of the 2020 census, Stockville had a population of 25. Besides the county courthouse, there is a small post office located in Stockville, and no other services or businesses.

== History ==
Stockville was founded in 1872. Its name refers to the livestock of the many ranchers in the area.

Originally, a band of Oglala Dakota called the Cut-off Oglala had settled the area by 1870. In the same year white cattlemen began to settle near Medicine Creek. In fall 1872, the Oglala chief Whistler and two more Oglala were murdered, probably by white bison hunters, and in 1873-1874 the Oglala departed the valley to reside on a reservation.

== Geography ==
According to the United States Census Bureau, the village has a total area of 0.26 square miles (0.67 km^{2}), all of it land.

== Demographics ==
Historical population
Census	Pop.	Note	%±
1890	227		—
1900	269		18.5%
1910	232		−13.8%
1920	196		−15.5%
1930	186		−5.1%
1940	238		28.0%
1950	181		−23.9%
1960	91		−49.7%
1970	61		−33.0%
1980	45		−26.2%
1990	32		−28.9%
2000	36		12.5%
2010	25		−30.6%
2020	25		0.0%
U.S. Decennial Census

=== 2010 census ===
As of the census of 2010, there were 25 people, 11 households, and 8 families residing in the village. The population density was 96.2 inhabitants per square mile (37.1/km^{2}). There were 19 housing units at an average density of 73.1 per square mile (28.2/km^{2}). The racial makeup of the village was 96.0% White and 4.0% from other races. Hispanic or Latino of any race were 4.0% of the population.

There were 11 households, of which 18.2% had children under the age of 18 living with them, 72.7% were married couples living together, and 27.3% were non-families. 27.3% of all households were made up of individuals, and 9.1% had someone living alone who was 65 years of age or older. The average household size was 2.27 and the average family size was 2.75.

The median age in the village was 62.8 years. 20% of residents were under the age of 18; 0.0% were between the ages of 18 and 24; 8% were from 25 to 44; 32% were from 45 to 64; and 40% were 65 years of age or older. The gender makeup of the village was 48.0% male and 52.0% female.

=== 2000 census ===
As of the census of 2000, there were 36 people, 17 households, and 10 families residing in the village. The population density was 137.9 inhabitants per square mile (53.2/km^{2}). There were 20 housing units at an average density of 76.6 per square mile (29.6/km^{2}). The racial makeup of the village was 100.00% White. Hispanic or Latino of any race were 5.56% of the population.

There were 17 households, out of which 29.4% had children under the age of 18 living with them, 47.1% were married couples living together, 17.6% had a female householder with no husband present, and 35.3% were non-families. 35.3% of all households were made up of individuals, and 5.9% had someone living alone who was 65 years of age or older. The average household size was 2.12 and the average family size was 2.73.

In the village, the population was spread out, with 27.8% under the age of 18, 2.8% from 18 to 24, 27.8% from 25 to 44, 27.8% from 45 to 64, and 13.9% who were 65 years of age or older. The median age was 40 years. For every 100 females, there were 125.0 males. For every 100 females age 18 and over, there were 116.7 males.

As of 2000 the median income for a household in the village was $31,250, and the median income for a family was $35,714. Males had a median income of $22,083 versus $21,250 for females. The per capita income for the village was $13,329. There were no families and 4.4% of the population living below the poverty line, including no under eighteens and none of those over 64.

== Education ==
It is in the Maywood Public Schools school district.

== Notable people ==
- Frank B. Morrison, 31st Governor of Nebraska

== See also ==
- List of municipalities in Nebraska
