= Senator McDonald =

Senator McDonald may refer to:

== Members of the United States Senate ==
- Alexander McDonald (American politician) (1832–1903), U.S. Senator from Arkansas from 1868 to 1871
- Joseph E. McDonald (1819–1891), U.S. Senator from Indiana from 1875 to 1881

== United States state senate members ==
- Albert McDonald (1930–2014), Alabama State Senate
- Andrew J. McDonald (born 1966), Connecticut State Senate
- Charles James McDonald (1793–1860), Georgia State Senate
- Donald A. McDonald (1833–1906), Wisconsin State Senate
- Edward F. McDonald (1844–1892), New Jersey State Senate
- Gordon McDonald (Nebraska politician) (1935–2020), Nebraska State Senate
- Jesse Fuller McDonald (1858–1942), Colorado State Senate
- John McDonald (Maine politician) (1773–1826), Maine State Senate
- John Angus McDonald (1917–2008), Florida State Senate
- Roy J. McDonald (born 1947), New York State Senate
- Richard N. McDonald (1948–2001), Nebraska State Senate
- Simon S. McDonald (1869–1956), North Dakota State Senate
- Vickie McDonald (born 1947), Nebraska State Senate

== See also ==
- Senator MacDonald (disambiguation)
