= Jerry Schmitt (Nebraska politician) =

American politician (1938–2021)

Member of the Nebraska Legislature from the 41st district
- In office January 6, 1993 – January 3, 2001
- Preceded by: Carson Rogers
- Succeeded by: Richard N. McDonald

Personal details
- Born: August 28, 1938 Oak, Nebraska
- Died: April 2, 2021 (aged 82) Burwell, Nebraska
- Party: Republican
- Spouse: Lavonne Holmes (m. 1964)
- Children: 2 (Dennis, Bruce)
- Occupation: State trooper

Military service
- Allegiance: United States
- Branch/service: United States Army
- Years of service: 1956–1958

Jerry Schmitt (August 28, 1938 – April 2, 2021) was a Republican politician from Nebraska who served as a member of the Nebraska Legislature from the 41st district from 1993 to 2001.

== Early life ==
Schmitt was born in Oak, Nebraska, and graduated from Nelson High School in 1955. He joined the U.S. Army, serving from 1956 to 1958. Schmitt worked as a construction worker and truck driver, and joined the Nebraska State Patrol in 1962.

== Nebraska Legislature ==
In 1992, as he was retiring from the State Patrol, Schmitt ran against incumbent State Senator Carson Rogers in the 41st district, which included Boone, Custer, Garfield, Greeley, Hall, Howard, Sherman, Valley, and Wheeler counties in central Nebraska. Schmitt was joined in the nonpartisan primary by Jake Bredthauer, Rogers's 1988 opponent, and Jerry Hickman, a farmer. Schmitt and Hickman attacked Rogers for voting for the state's mandatory seat-belt law in 1992, with Schmitt observing, "I don't feel as an adult we need to be told to wear it." In the primary election, Schmitt narrowly placed first over Rogers, winning 41 percent of the vote to Rogers's 39 percent, and they advanced to the general election.

In the general election, Schmitt initially led Rogers by fewer than one hundred votes before all of the absentee ballots in the election were counted, and Schmitt led by 30 votes after the original count was completed, which triggered an automatic recount. Prior to a recount of the ballots, Rogers filed a lawsuit alleging that Schmitt was constitutionally disqualified from serving in the legislature because his service as a state trooper, which Rogers argued violated a provision of the state constitution barring anyone from holding "any lucrative office under the authority of this state" from being eligible to serve in the legislature. A judge declined to block the recount and automatically disqualify Schmitt, and the completed recount confirmed that Schmitt defeated Rogers by 36 votes. Rogers subsequently filed an election contest with the state legislature, arguing that it should seat him instead of Schmitt, but the legislature unanimously voted to affirm Schmitt's victory.

Schmitt ran for re-election in 1996, and was challenged by Jerry Hickman, who had run in 1992, and agriculture consultant Arthur Shotkoski. Schmitt won 72 percent of the vote in the primary election, and following a recount for second place, advanced to the general election with Hickman. In the general election, Schmitt won re-election in a landslide, defeating Hickman, 74–26 percent.

Schmitt declined to seek re-election in 2000, and was succeeded by Richard N. McDonald. McDonald died eight months into his first term, and Governor Mike Johanns appointed his widow, Vickie McDonald, to serve until a 2002 special election. Schmitt ran against McDonald and rancher David Wright in the special election. In the primary election, McDonald placed first, winning 54 percent of the vote to Schmitt's 26 percent and Wright's 19 percent, and in the general election, McDonald defeated Schmitt in a landslide, winning 63 percent of the vote to his 37 percent.

== Death ==
Schmitt died on April 2, 2021.
