= Richard Maresh =

American politician (1917–2004)

Member of the Nebraska Legislature from the 32nd district
- In office January 5, 1971 – June 7, 1981
- Preceded by: Theodore Wenzlaff
- Succeeded by: Sharon Apking

Personal details
- Born: September 8, 1917 Milligan, Nebraska
- Died: November 10, 2004 (aged 87) Geneva, Nebraska
- Party: Republican
- Education: University of Nebraska
- Occupation: Farmer, flight engineer

Military service
- Allegiance: United States
- Branch/service: United States Army Air Forces
- Awards: Air Medal; Distinguished Flying Cross

Richard H. Maresh (September 8, 1917 – November 10, 2004) was a Republican politician from Nebraska who served as a member of the Nebraska Legislature from the 32nd district from 1971 to 1981.

== Early life ==
Maresh was born in Milligan, Nebraska, in 1917, and graduated from Milligan High School. He served in the U.S. Army Air Forces during World War II, and he attended Air Force mechanic and flight engineer schools. While serving in the military, he was awarded the Air Medal and the Distinguished Flying Cross. Upon returning to Nebraska, he was a farmer, and served on the Nebraska State Fair Board and on the Milligan School Board.

== Nebraska Legislature ==
In 1970, State Senator Theodore Wenzlaff, who was appointed to replace Eric Rasmussen upon his election to the Nebraska Public Service Commission, ran for a full term. Maresh ran against Wenzlaff in the 32nd district, which included Clay, Fillmore, and Thayer counties. He faced a crowded primary that included newspaper publisher Al Bonta, farmer Melvin Kuska, and grain dealer Larry Logan. Maresh placed first, winning 29 percent of the vote to Ruska's 21 percent and Wenzlaff's 17 percent, making Wenzlaff one of three senators to lose renomination in the primary. In the general election, Maresh defeated Kuska, winning his first term in the legislature, 55–45 percent.

Maresh ran for re-election in 1974, and was challenged by former Crete Mayor George Plessman. Maresh placed first in the primary election, winning 68 percent of the vote to Plessman's 32 percent. In the general election, Maresh defeated Plessman in a landslide, receiving 74 percent of the vote to Plessman's 26 percent.

In 1978, Maresh ran for a third term. He was challenged by Gene Harding, a farmer who worked on the journalism staff of the University of Nebraska–Lincoln. Maresh placed first in the primary election, winning 67 percent of the vote to Harding's 33 percent. Maresh won the general election in a landslide, winning 67–33 percent.

== Post-legislative career ==
Governor Charles Thone appointed Maresh as the deputy director of the Nebraska Department of Agriculture in 1981, and he resigned from the legislature on June 7, 1981, to accept the position. Thone appointed Sharon Apking as Maresh's successor. In 1983, following the election of Democrat Bob Kerrey as Governor in 1982, Maresh resigned as deputy director.

In 1986, Maresh ran for the state legislature, challenging incumbent State Senator Don Eret for re-election. Though the race was officially nonpartisan, Maresh was one of several Republican candidates to challenge Eret, who defeated Apking in 1982 as a Republican but later switched to the Democratic Party. In the primary, Maresh narrowly placed third, receiving 29 percent of the vote to Eret's 31 percent and farmer George Coordsen's 32 percent.

Maresh was elected to the Southeast Community College Board of Trustees in 1988. He was re-elected unopposed in 1992 and 1996 without opposition. He initially declined to seek re-election in 2000, but launched a write-in campaign the week before election day when no other candidate filed, and ultimately won. In 2002, citing his ill health, Maresh resigned from the board.

== Death ==
Maresh died on November 10, 2004.
