= Senator Schmitt =

Senator Schmitt may refer to:

- Eric Schmitt (born 1975), U.S. senator from Missouri since 2023
- Harrison Schmitt (born 1935), U.S. senator from New Mexico from 1977 to 1983
- Jerry Schmitt (Nebraska politician) (1938–2021), Nebraska State Senate
- Matt Schmit (born 1979), Minnesota State Senate

== See also ==
- Senator Schmidt (disambiguation)
- Senator Schmitz (disambiguation)
