= Gables, Nebraska =

Unincorporated community in Nebraska, United States

- Unincorporated community
- Location within Nebraska Location within the United States
- Coordinates: 41°56′18″N 98°51′0″W
- Country: United States
- State: Nebraska
- County: Garfield
- Elevation: 2,169 ft (661 m)
- Time zone: UTC-6 (Central (CST))
  - Summer (DST): UTC-5 (CDT)
- GNIS feature ID: 835308

Gables is an unincorporated community in Garfield County, Nebraska, United States. Its elevation is 2,169 feet (661 m). It lies northeast of the city of Burwell, which is the county seat.

== History ==
A house containing the first post office featured gables, and from that landmark the town took its name. The post office in Gables operated from 1919 until 1929.
