= Chizek =

Chizek may refer to:

== People ==
- Cletus Chizek, one of the founders of Crowe Global
- Howie Chizek (1947–2012), American radio personality and philanthropist
- Jerry Chizek (1936–2014), American politician from Nebraska
