= C. C. Lillibridge =

American politician (1894–1965)

Member of the Nebraska Legislature from the 23rd district
- In office January 7, 1947 – January 4, 1955
- Preceded by: John Mekota
- Succeeded by: Mervin Bedford

Personal details
- Born: May 10, 1894 Weston, Nebraska
- Died: April 30, 1965 (aged 70) Lincoln, Nebraska
- Party: Republican
- Spouse: Ella E. Ziegenbein (m. 1917)
- Children: 1
- Education: University of Nebraska College of Dentistry
- Occupation: Dentist

Chauncey Clark Lillibridge (May 10, 1894 – April 30, 1965) was a Republican politician and dentist from Nebraska who served as a member of the Nebraska Legislature from the 23rd district from 1947 to 1955.

== Early life ==
Lillibridge was born in Weston, Nebraska, in 1894, and grew up in Weston and Wahoo, graduating from Wahoo High School. He graduated from the University of Nebraska College of Dentistry, and settled in Crete, where he opened a dental practice. Lillibridge served as the Crete City Treasurer from 1926 to 1946, and later served as president of the Nebraska State Dental Association from 1951 to 1952, and as president of the state Izaak Walton League.

== Nebraska Legislature ==
In 1946, State Senator John Mekota declined to seek re-election, and Lillibridge ran to succeed him in the 23rd district, which included Fillmore and Saline counties. He faced Edward Steinacher, an attorney from Geneva, in the nonpartisan primary. Lillibridge placed first in the primary, receiving 63 percent of the vote to Steinacher's 37 percent. He defeated Steinacher by a wide margin in the general election, receiving 66 percent of the vote. Though the race was formally nonpartisan, Lillibridge was a member of the Nebraska Republican Party.

Lillibridge ran for re-election in 1948, and was challenged by Francis E. Craig. Lillibridge won 65 percent of the vote in the primary, and in the general election, he defeated Craig, 61–39 percent.

In 1950, Lillibridge ran for a third term, and was challenged by Craig and Art Brown, a publisher and former mayor of Friend. Lillibridge placed first in the primary, receiving 45 percent of the vote to Brown's 35 percent and Craig's 20 percent, and advanced to the general election with Brown. On September 25, 1950, Brown withdrew from the election, citing the "manpower shortage," and Craig automatically replaced him on the general election ballot. Lillibridge again defeated Craig by a wide margin, winning the general election, 62–38 percent.

Lillibridge ran for re-election in 1952. In the nonpartisan primary, he faced Craig, Harry Miller, and former Saline County Commissioner Frank Sukovaty. Lillibridge received 43 percent of the vote, and advanced to the general election with Sukovaty, who placed second with 24 percent. In the general election, Lillibridge defeated Sukovaty with 59 percent of the vote.

In 1954, Lillibridge initially announced that he would not seek re-election, citing "health concerns," but re-entered the race after another candidate withdrew. Lillibridge narrowly placed first in the primary, winning 39 percent of the vote and receiving 2 more votes than Mervin Bedford, and they proceeded to the general election. On election night, Bedford appeared to defeat Lillibridge by 20 votes, and when the results were canvassed, Bedford's victory over Lillibridge was confirmed to be 9 votes. Lillibridge contested the results before the state legislature and sought a recount, and Bedford was preliminarily seated while the recount took place. At the conclusion of the recount, Bedford was declared the winner by 31 votes, and Lillibridge conceded.

== Post-legislative career ==
After leaving the legislature, Lillibridge continued his dental practice. In 1962, he ran for the state legislature again from the 23rd district after State Senator Joe Vosoba declined to seek re-election. Lillibridge placed first in the nonpartisan primary, winning 38 percent of the vote to Eric Rasmussen's 36 percent. In the general election, Rasmussen defeated Lillibridge with 54 percent of the vote.

Lillibridge was elected mayor of Crete unopposed in 1964 when both of the local political parties endorsed him.

== Death ==
Lillibridge died on April 30, 1965.
