= Pavillion Hotel (Nebraska) =

- U.S. National Register of Historic Places
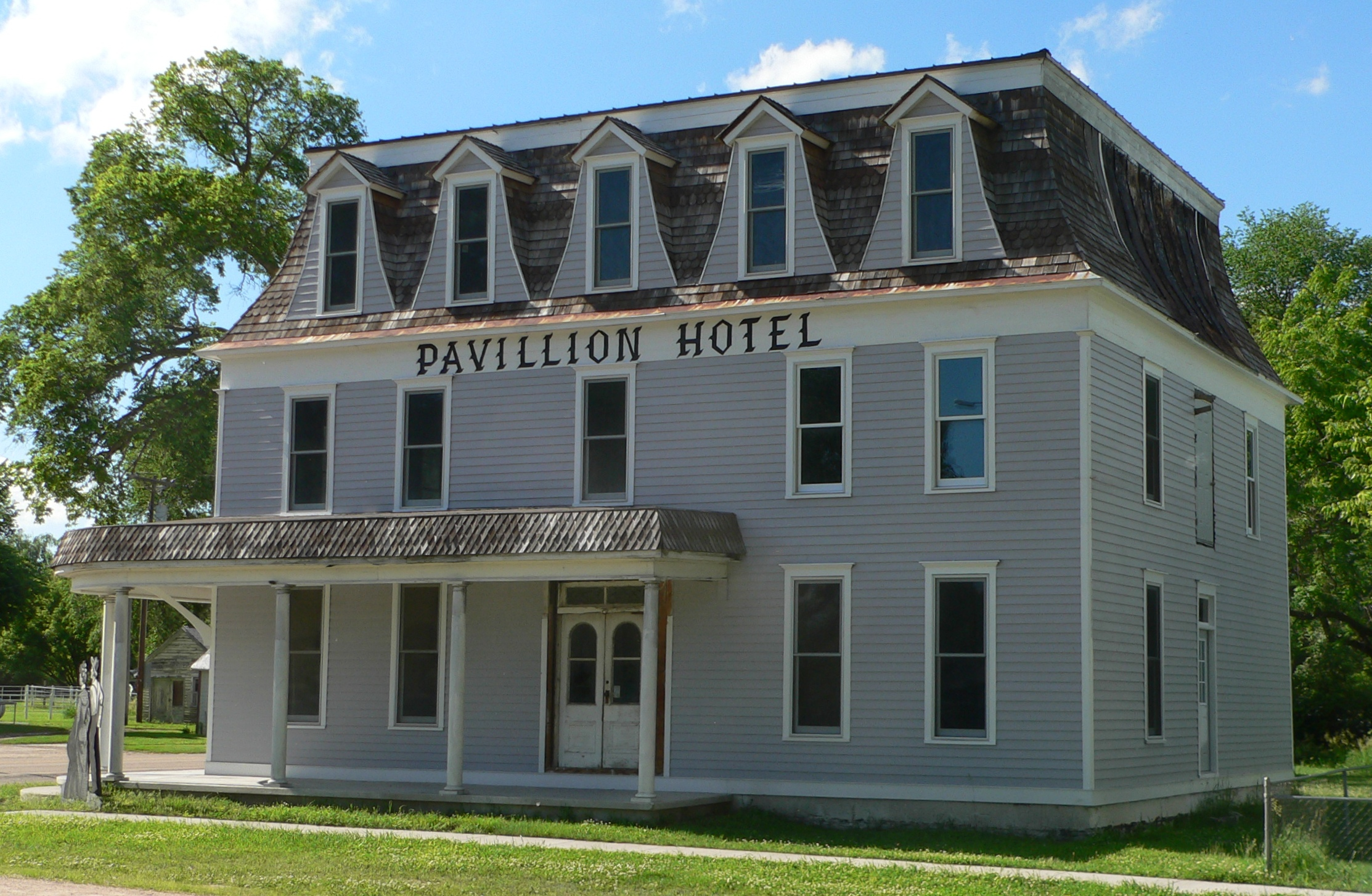

- Location within Nebraska Location within the United States
- Location: Main St. Square, Taylor, Nebraska
- Coordinates: 41°46′17″N 99°22′44″W
- Area: less than one acre
- Built by: Carter, Herman
- Architectural style: Second Empire, Mansard
- NRHP reference No.: 89002039
- Added to NRHP: November 27, 1989

The Pavillion Hotel on Main St. Square in Taylor, Nebraska, is a building that was listed on the National Register of Historic Places in 1989.

It was built by Herman Carter in 1887 in anticipation of the arrival of the railroad, which was just 13 miles east in Burwell, Nebraska. However, the railroad never came.

The site has also been designated NEHBS #LP03-1.
