= Deverre, Nebraska =

Unincorporated community in Garfield County, Nebraska, United States

- Unincorporated community
- Location within Nebraska Location within the United States
- Coordinates: 41°53′33″N 99°5′13″W
- Country: United States
- State: Nebraska
- County: Garfield
- Elevation: 2,431 ft (741 m)
- Time zone: UTC-6 (Central (CST))
  - Summer (DST): UTC-5 (CDT)
- GNIS feature ID: 828689

Deverre is an unincorporated community in Garfield County, Nebraska, United States. Its elevation is 2,431 feet (741 m). It lies north of Burwell, which is the county seat.

== History ==
Deverre was named for Deverre Cass. A post office in Deverre was established in 1905, and remained in operation until it was discontinued in 1933.
