= George Coordsen =

American politician (1935–2003)

Chair of the Executive Board of the Nebraska Legislature
- In office January 8, 1996 – January 8, 2003
- Preceded by: Tim Hall; Floyd Vrtiska (acting)
- Succeeded by: L. Patrick Engel

Member of the Nebraska Legislature from the 32nd district
- In office January 7, 1987 – January 8, 2003
- Preceded by: Don Eret
- Succeeded by: Jeanne Combs

Personal details
- Born: August 13, 1935 Fairbury, Nebraska
- Died: November 13, 2003 (aged 68) Omaha, Nebraska
- Party: Republican
- Spouse: Janice Fetter (m. 1956)
- Children: 3 (Debra, Kevin, Valerie)

George E. Coordsen (August 13, 1935 – November 13, 2003) was a Republican politician from Nebraska who served as a member of the Nebraska Legislature from the 32nd district from 1987 to 2003, and as Chairperson of the Legislature's Executive Board from 1996 to 2003.

== Early life ==
Coordsen was born in Fairbury, Nebraska, in 1935, and graduated from Alexandria High School. He worked as a farmer, and served on the Gilead School Board from 1963 to 1972. From 1981 to 1986, Coordsen served as the chairman of the Nebraska Sorghum Board.

== Nebraska Legislature ==
In 1986, Coordsen challenged incumbent State Senator Don Eret, who had switched to the Democratic Party during his term, for re-election in the 32nd district, which included Fillmore, Jefferson, Saline, and Thayer counties in south-central Nebraska. He narrowly placed first in the primary election, receiving 32 percent of the vote to Eret's 31 percent, while former State Senator Richard Maresh placed third with 29 percent and farmer Michael Winter won 8 percent. Coordsen and Eret advanced to the general election, where Coordsen won, 56–44 percent.

Coordsen ran for re-election in 1990. He was challenged by Debra Molthan, a nurse, who ended her campaign but whose name remained on the ballot. Coordsen placed first in the primary in a landslide, winning 80 percent of the vote to Molthan's 20 percent. Molthan's name remained on the ballot in the general election, though she did not actively campaign, and Coordsen won re-election, 80–20 percent.

He sought a third term in 1994, and no candidates filed against him, but Eret, whom Coordsen defeated in 1986, mounted a write-in campaign. Coordsen won 94 percent of the vote, with Eret receiving 467 write-in votes and 6 percent of the vote. Eret did not continue his campaign in the general election, and Coordsen was re-elected unopposed.

In 1996, following the resignation of State Senator Tim Hall, who served as the Chairman of the legislature's Executive Board, Coordsen ran to succeed him as Chairman. He narrowly defeated Floyd Vrtiska, the acting Chairman of the Board and a fellow Republican, for the position on the third ballot, winning 25–20.

Coordsen ran for re-election to a fourth term in 1998, and was challenged by attorney Joseph Casson. In the primary election, Coordsen placed first over Casson in a landslide, receiving 79 percent of the vote to Casson's 21 percent. In the general election, Coordsen won re-election, 82–18 percent.

In 2002, though Coordsen was eligible to seek a final term prior to being term-limited, he ultimately declined to run for a fifth term, and was the only incumbent legislator to decline to seek re-election that year.

== Death ==
Coarsen died on November 13, 2003.
