= Senator Rogers =

Senator Rogers may refer to:

- B. H. Rogers (1905–1977), Louisiana State Senate
- Carson Rogers (1924–2005), Nebraska State Senate
- Charles Cassius Rogers (1849–1937), Wisconsin State Senate
- Chip Rogers (born 1968), Georgia State Senate
- Daniel Rogers (politician) (1754–1806), Delaware State Senate
- Don Rogers (1928–2018), California State Senate
- Earline S. Rogers (born 1934), Indiana State Senate
- George F. Rogers (1887–1948), New York State Senate
- George Rogers (Massachusetts politician) (born 1933), Massachusetts State Senate
- Gordon Rogers (born 1964), Rhode Island State Senate
- John Sill Rogers (1796–1860), Connecticut State Senate
- Linda Rogers (politician), Indiana State Senate
- Lynn Rogers (politician) (born 1958), Kansas State Senate
- Mike Rogers (Michigan politician) (born 1963), Michigan State Senate
- Richard Dean Rogers (1921–2016), Kansas State Senate
- Samuel St. George Rogers (1832–1880), Florida State Senate
- Sherman S. Rogers (1830–1900), New York State Senate
- Thomas Jones Rogers (1781–1832), Pennsylvania State Senate
- Wendy Rogers (politician) (born 1954), Arizona State Senate

== See also ==
- Senator Rodgers (disambiguation)
