= Donald Wagner =

Donald Wagner is the name of:

- Donald Wagner (Nebraska politician) (1927–2023), American politician from Nebraska
- Donald P. Wagner (born 1960), American politician from California
