= Senator Simon =

Senator Simon may refer to:

== Members of the United States Senate ==
- Joseph Simon (politician) (1851–1935), U.S. Senator from Oregon from 1898 to 1903
- Paul Simon (politician) (1928–2003), U.S. Senator from Illinois from 1985 to 1997

== United States state senate members ==
- Brad Simon (politician) (fl. 2020s), Arkansas State Senate
- Corey Simon (born 1977), Florida State Senate
- James D. Simon (1897–1982), Louisiana State Senate
- Neil Simon (Nebraska politician) (1946–2001), Nebraska State Senate
