= Venditte =

Venditte is a surname. Notable people with this surname include:

- Pat Venditte (born 1985), American professional baseball player
- Patrick Venditte (born 1945), American politician and teacher from Nebraska
