= Karen Kilgarin =

American politician

Member of the Nebraska Legislature from the 7th district
- In office January 7, 1981 – May 1, 1984
- Preceded by: Patrick Venditte
- Succeeded by: Tim Hall

Personal details
- Born: March 12, 1957 (age 69) Omaha, Nebraska
- Party: Democratic
- Education: Kearney State College
- Occupation: Journalist, lobbyist

Karen Kilgarin (born March 12, 1957) is a Democratic politician, journalist, and lobbyist from Nebraska who served as a member of the Nebraska Legislature from the 7th district from 1981 to 1984.

== Early life ==
Kilgarin was born in Omaha, Nebraska, in 1957, and graduated from Omaha South High School. She attended Kearney State College, graduating with her bachelor's degree in political science and journalism in 1979. After graduation, she worked as a real estate agent.

== Nebraska Legislature ==
In 1980, Kilgarin challenged State Senator Patrick Venditte for re-election in the South Omaha-based 7th district. Venditte placed first in the primary election, winning 50 percent to Kilgarin's 40 percent and perennial candidate Jake McCourt's 10 percent. Kilgarin defeated Venditte in the general election, winning 55 percent to his 45 percent, and became the youngest member of the legislature.

== Post-legislative career ==
Kilgarin initially ran for a second term in the legislature in 1984, but later announced that she would resign from the legislature and end her re-election campaign to become KETV's Lincoln bureau chief. She resigned from the legislature on May 1, 1984.

In 1992, Governor Ben Nelson appointed Kilgarin as his deputy chief of staff and director of public affairs. She left the Nelson administration in 1995 to become the director of communications and publications for the Nebraska State Education Association, and rejoined the administration in 1997 as Director of the Department of Administrative Services. Upon the election of Mike Johanns as Governor in 1998, Kilgarin left the department, and rejoined the State Education Association as the director of public affairs and communications.
