= Eric Rasmussen (politician) =

American politician (1926–2006)

Member of the Nebraska Public Service Commission from the 4th district
- In office January 9, 1969 – January 7, 1993
- Preceded by: District created
- Succeeded by: Rod Johnson

Member of the Nebraska Legislature
- In office January 9, 1963 – December 5, 1968
- Preceded by: Joe Vosoba
- Succeeded by: Theodore Wenzlaff
- Constituency: 23rd district (1963–1965); 32nd district (1965–1969)

Personal details
- Born: February 9, 1926 York County, Nebraska
- Died: November 22, 2006 (aged 80) Lincoln, Nebraska
- Party: Republican
- Spouse: Marie Elizabeth Larsen (m. 1952)
- Children: 2 (Luann Marie, Eric Clark)

Eric C. Rasmussen (February 9, 1926 – November 22, 2006) was a Republican politician from Nebraska who served as a member of the Nebraska Public Service Commission from the 4th district from 1969 to 1993 and as a member of the Nebraska Legislature from 1963 to 1968.

== Early career ==
Rasmussen was born in York County, Nebraska, and served in the U.S. Army during World War II. Upon his return to Nebraska, he took up farming, and became the vice president of the Nebraska Cooperative Council.

== Nebraska Legislature ==
In 1962, Democratic State Senator Joe Vosoba announced that he would not seek re-election to a third term, and Rasmussen ran to succeed him in the 23rd district, which included Fillmore and Saline counties. In the nonpartisan primary, he faced former State Senator C. C. Lillibridge and farmer Karl Brinkman. Rasmussen narrowly placed second in the primary, winning 36 percent of the vote to Lillibridge's 38 percent, and the two advanced to the general election. Rasmussen defeated Lillibridge to win his first term in the legislature, 54–46 percent.

Rasmussen ran for re-election in 1964, and was challenged by Sherman Ashby, a funeral director and farmer from Geneva. In 1962, Nebraska voters approved a constitutional amendment extending legislative terms to four years and requiring redistricting. As a result of the redistricting, Rasmussen's district was redrawn, and he ran for re-election in the 32nd district, which included Clay, Fillmore, and Thayer counties. In the primary election, Rasmussen placed first, winning 54 percent of the vote to Ashby's 46 percent, and he won re-election in the general election by the same margin.

In 1966, Rasmussen ran for a full four-year term. He was challenged by Max Ball, a University of Nebraska student. In the primary election, Rasmussen placed first by a wide margin, winning 69 percent of the vote. In the general election, Rasmussen defeated Nall in a landslide, winning 72–28 percent.

After being elected to the Public Service Commission in 1968, Rasmussen resigned from the legislature, effective December 5, 1968, so that Governor Norbert Tiemann could appoint a successor prior to the start of a special legislative session that began on December 9.

== Nebraska Public Service Commission ==
In 1968, Rasmussen announced that he would run for a seat on the Nebraska Railway Commission. Following the expansion of the commission to five members and the creation of districts in 1963, Rasmussen ran in the 4th district, which included most of western Nebraska. In the Republican primary, Rasmussen faced incumbent Commissioner Robert Marland, who had been appointed in 1967 to an at-large seat; farmer Lynn Johnson; construction equipment salesman Vernon Johnson; railroad depot agent Russell Manson; and housewife Eleanor Sack. Rasmussen won a narrowly plurality, receiving 29 percent of the vote to Marland's 21 percent. In the general election, Rasmussen faced Al Bonta, the publisher of the Fillmore County News and the Democratic nominee. Rasmussen defeated Bonta in a landslide, winning his first term on the commission 69–31 percent.

Rasmussen ran for re-election in 1974. He was unopposed in the Republican primary, and faced farmer John Jacobs, the Democratic nominee, in the general election. Rasmussen defeated Jacobs, winning 56 percent of the vote to Jacobs's 44 percent.

In 1980, Rasmussen sought a third term on the commission. He was challenged by former York City Councilman Jerry Hoffmaster in the Republican primary. Hoffmaster was encouraged to challenge Rasmussen by fellow Commissioner Jack Romans, and Rasmussen alleged that Romans and Commissioner Duane Gay helped Hoffmaster raise funds from telephone companies doing business before the commission. Rasmussen defeated Hoffmaster by a wide margin, winning the primary 68–32 percent. In the general election, he was opposed by Elwood Mink, the owner of a delivery service. Rasmussen defeated Mink in a landslide, receiving 75 percent of the vote to Mink's 25 percent.

Rasmussen sought a fourth term in 1986, and was unopposed in the Republican primary. He faced no opponent in the general election, and won re-election uncontested. He declined to seek re-election in 1992.

== Death ==
Rasmussen died on November 22, 2006.
