= Sharon Apking =

American politician (1934–2019)

Member of the Nebraska Legislature from the 32nd district
- In office June 8, 1981 – January 5, 1983
- Preceded by: Richard Maresh
- Succeeded by: Don Eret

Personal details
- Born: July 14, 1934 Edinburg, Texas
- Died: May 16, 2019 (aged 84) Lincoln, Nebraska
- Party: Republican
- Spouse: William Apking (m. 1958; died 1992)
- Children: 2 (David and Elizabeth)
- Education: Wayne State College; Indiana University; University of Nebraska

Sharon Vey Apking (née Anderson July 14, 1934 – May 16, 2019) was a Republican politician from Nebraska who served as a member of the Nebraska Legislature from the 32nd district from 1981 to 1983.

== Early life ==
Sharon Vey Anderson was born in Edinburg, Texas, and attended Wayne State College, Indiana University, and the University of Nebraska. She married William Apking in 1958 and moved to Alexandria, Nebraska. She was a director of the State Bank of Alexandria, which was owned by her husband, and served on the Meridian School Board from 1972 to 1981.

== Nebraska Legislature ==
In 1981, State Senator Richard Maresh resigned to serve as the deputy director of the Nebraska Department of Agriculture, and Governor Charles Thone appointed her to serve out the remaining two years in his term. She was sworn in on June 8, 1991.

Apking ran for a full term in 1982. She faced a crowded field of opponents, including Don Apley, a car dealer; Norm Behrens, the former Mayor of Crete; farmers Don Eret, Ken Robare, and Len Schropfer; and Bill Thomas, a community activist. In the nonpartisan primary, Apking narrowly placed first, winning 27 percent of the vote to Eret's 26 percent, and they advanced to the general election. Eret defeated Apking by a wide margin in the general election, winning 56–44 percent.

== Death ==
Apking died on May 16, 2019.
