= James Dickinson (Nebraska politician) =

American politician (1917–2004)

Member of the Nebraska Legislature from the 31st district
- In office January 2, 1973 – January 5, 1977
- Preceded by: Willard Waldo (redistricted)
- Succeeded by: Neil Simon

Personal details
- Born: August 4, 1917 Kewanee, Illinois
- Died: May 6, 2004 (aged 86) Gretna, Nebraska
- Party: Republican
- Spouse: Dorothy Siert (m. 1940)
- Children: 2 (Nancy, Robert)
- Education: University of Nebraska
- Occupation: Farmer

James A. Dickinson (August 4, 1917 – May 6, 2004) was a Republican politician from Nebraska who served as a member of the Nebraska Legislature from the 31st district from 1973 to 1977.

== Early life ==
Dickinson was born in Kewanee, Illinois, and grew up in Gretna, Nebraska, graduating from Gretna High School. he attended the University of Nebraska, and settled in Millard, where he was a livestock feeder and farmer and served on the school board. Dickinson served on the Douglas County School Reorganization Committee, and as a member of the board of directors of the National Livestock Feeders Association.

== Nebraska Legislature ==
In 1972, following redistricting, Dickinson ran for the legislature from the newly created 31st district, which was based in western Douglas County. In the nonpartisan primary, he ran against former State Senator Donald Troudt, University of Nebraska at Omaha student Thomas Penke, building superintendent Opie Opocensky, civic activist Marjorie Lamp, lounge owner Donald Jensen, and college administrator Robert Gieselman. Dickinson placed second, winning 23 percent of the vote, and advanced to the general election with Lamp, who won 26 percent of the vote. In the general election, Dickinson defeated Lamp, winning 57 percent of the vote to her 43 percent.

Dickinson ran for a second term in 1976. He was challenged by Neil Simon, a regional sales director; Michael Brown, a former Omaha police officer; and Metropolitan Technical Community College student Bernard Cochran. Dickinson placed first in the primary, winning 50 percent of the vote, and proceeded to the general election with Simon, who placed second with 26 percent of the vote. Though the election was formally nonpartisan, Dickinson was a Republican and Simon was a Democrat. Simon narrowly defeated Dickinson, winning 52-48 percent.

== Death ==
Dickinson died on May 6, 2004.
