= Senator Schmitz =

Senator Schmitz may refer to:

- Becky Schmitz (fl. 2000s–2010s), Iowa State Senate
- John G. Schmitz (1930–2001), California State Senate

== See also ==
- Senator Schmidt (disambiguation)
- Senator Schmitt (disambiguation)
