= Donald Wagner (Nebraska politician) =

American politician (1927–2023)

Donald L. Wagner

Member of the Nebraska Legislature from the 41st district
- In office January 5, 1979 – January 9, 1985
- Preceded by: Dennis L. Rasmussen
- Succeeded by: Carson Rogers

Personal details
- Born: May 31, 1927 McCook, Nebraska
- Died: October 24, 2023 (aged 96) Burwell, Nebraska
- Party: Republican
- Spouse: Gertrude E. Teel (m. 1948)
- Children: 15 (Ron, Chris, Barb, Larry, Marty, Chuck, Mary, Tom, Therese, Regina, Kevin, James, Patti, Vicky, Mike)
- Occupation: Farmer

Donald Lee Wagner (May 31, 1927 – October 24, 2023) was a Republican politician from Nebraska who served as a member of the Nebraska Legislature from the 41st district from 1979 to 1985.

== Early life ==
Wagner was born in McCook, Nebraska, in 1927. He served in the U.S. Army during World War II and later worked as an engineer. Wagner owned and operated a 700-acre farm in Ord, and served on the Twin Loups Reclamation District Board of Directors and as the president of the Nebraska Water Resources Council.

== Nebraska Legislature ==
In 1978, State Senator Dennis L. Rasmussen announced that he would resign from the state legislature to become a lobbyist, and shortly after his inauguration, newly elected Governor Charles Thone appointed Wagner to serve out the remaining two years of Rasmussen's term. Wagner was sworn in on January 5, 1979. Wagner ran for a full term in 1980 and was elected unopposed. He declined to seek re-election in 1984.

== Death ==
Wagner died on October 24, 2023.
