= LeRoy Bahensky =

American politician (1909–1993)

Member of the Nebraska Legislature from the 29th district
- In office January 1, 1963 – January 5, 1965
- Preceded by: Jack Romans
- Succeeded by: Rudolf Kokes (redistricted)
- In office January 4, 1955 – January 6, 1959
- Preceded by: Hugh Carson
- Succeeded by: Jack Romans

Personal details
- Born: February 8, 1909 Merrick County, Nebraska
- Died: April 29, 1993 (aged 84) St. Paul, Nebraska
- Party: Democratic
- Spouse(s): Alice Julia Kotrc (m. 1928; died 1984) Marjory Hines (m. 1984)
- Children: 4 (Dorothy, Rena, Loretta, Cheryl)
- Occupation: Land appraiser, farm and implement dealer

LeRoy Bahensky (February 8, 1909 – April 29, 1993) was a Democratic politician from Nebraska who served as a member of the Nebraska Legislature from the 29th district from 1955 to 1959 and again from 1963 to 1965.

== Early life ==
Bahensky was born in Merrick County, Nebraska, near Archer. He grew up in St. Paul and graduated from St. Paul High School. He began working as a farmer and moved to Spalding, where he sold John Deere farm equipment from 1950 to 1954, before moving back to St. Paul.

== Nebraska Legislature ==
In 1954, State Senator Hugh Carson declined to seek re-election, and Bahensky ran to succeed him in the 29th district, which included Greeley, Howard, Valley, and Wheeler counties. In the nonpartisan primary, he faced trucking company owner Jack Romans and former local superintendent Arnold Tuning. In the nonpartisan primary, Bahensky placed first, receiving 46 percent of the vote to Romans's 30 percent. They proceeded to the general election, where Bahensky defeated Romans in a landslide, winning 68 percent of the vote.

Bahensky ran for re-election in 1956, and won his second term unopposed.

In 1958, Bahensky declined to seek re-election to a third term, and was succeeded by Romans. After Bahensky left office, he was appointed to the Nebraska Game Commission by Governor Ralph G. Brooks, and was unanimously confirmed by the legislature.

Bahensky resigned from the commission in 1962, and challenged Romans for re-election to the legislature. Bahensky placed second in the primary, receiving 36 percent of the vote to Romans's 52 percent. They advanced to the general election, which Bahensky narrowly won, receiving 51 percent of the vote to Romans's 49 percent.

In 1964, following the expansion of the state legislature to forty-nine districts and subsequent redistricting, Bahensky ran for re-election in the 41st district, which included most of his previous district. He was challenged by Rudolf Kokes and Arthur Shotkoski in the primary. Bahensky won 38 percent of the vote in the primary to Kokes's 43 percent, and lost the general election by a wide margin, receiving just 40 percent of the vote to Kokes's 60 percent.

== Death ==
Bahensky died on April 29, 1993.
