= Senator Rodgers =

Senator Rodgers may refer to:

- Frank E. Rodgers (1909–2000), New Jersey State Senate
- John S. Rodgers (born 1965), Vermont State Senate
- Norman Rodgers (born 1927), Iowa State Senate
- Samuel Rodgers (1894–1970), Northern Irish Senate
- Samuel R. Rodgers (1798–1866), Tennessee State Senate

== See also ==
- Senator Rogers (disambiguation)
