= John Hilgert =

American politician

John A. Hilgert

Director of the Nebraska Department of Veterans' Affairs
- Incumbent
- Assumed office November 20, 2001
- Governor: Mike Johanns; Dave Heineman; Pete Ricketts; Jim Pillen
- Preceded by: Dan Parker (interim)

Member of the Nebraska Legislature from the 7th district
- In office August 30, 1995 – November 20, 2001
- Preceded by: Tim Hall
- Succeeded by: John Synowiecki

Personal details
- Born: January 8, 1964 (age 62) Omaha, Nebraska
- Party: Democratic (1985–present); Republican (before 1985)
- Spouse: Cara Linden
- Children: 2 (John, Caroline)
- Education: University of Nebraska–Lincoln (B.S.); Creighton University School of Law (J.D.)

Military service
- Allegiance: United States
- Branch/service: United States Army
- Years of service: 1989–1992

John A. Hilgert (born January 8, 1964) is a politician from Nebraska serving as the Director of the Nebraska Department of Veterans' Affairs since 2001. Hilgert served in the Nebraska Legislature from 1995 to 2001.

== Early career ==
Hilgert was born in Omaha, Nebraska, and graduated from Daniel J. Gross Catholic High School in 1982. He attended the University of Nebraska–Lincoln, graduating with his bachelor's degree in business administration in 1986. While an undergraduate student, he served as a legislative aide to State Senator Tim Hall. Hilgert then attended the Creighton University School of Law, where he graduated with his juris doctor in 1989. He trained at the Judge Advocate General's Legal Center and School, and completed the officer basic course in 1989 and the trial advocacy course in 1990, serving in the United States Army Judge Advocate General's Corps from 1989 to 1992. After Hilgert left active duty, he returned to Nebraska and worked for the Archdiocese of Omaha as the development director of Catholic Services.

== Nebraska Legislature ==
In 1995, State Senator Tim Hall resigned from the Legislature to become Deputy Insurance Commissioner, and Governor Ben Nelson appointed Hilgert as his successor in the 7th district, which was based in South Omaha. Hilgert ran for a full term in 1996, and was challenged by Democrat Craig Christiansen, the president of the Nebraska State Education Association, who had also applied to fill Hall's vacancy, and Republican P.J. Asta, a janitor who had challenged Hall in 1992. In the primary election, Hilgert placed first with 55 percent of the vote, and advanced to the general election against Christiansen, who received 36 percent of the vote. In the general election, Hilgert defeated Christiansen by a wide margin, winning 56 percent of the vote. Hilgert was re-elected unopposed in 2000.

Hilgert considered running for Congress against Republican Congressman Lee Terry in 2002, but ultimately declined to do so, citing his inability to raise sufficient campaign funds to mount a credible campaign.

== Nebraska Department of Veterans' Affairs ==
In 2001, Republican Governor Mike Johanns appointed Hilgert as the director of the Nebraska Department of Veterans' Affairs. Hilgert was retained as director under governors Dave Heineman, Pete Ricketts, and Jim Pillen.
