= Senator Schmidt =

Senator Schmidt may refer to:

- Art Schmidt (1927–2018), Kentucky State Senate
- Carl Schmidt (politician) (1835–1888), Wisconsin State Senate
- Charles J. Schmidt (1907–1966), Wisconsin State Senate
- Dan Schmidt (born 1954), Idaho State Senate
- Derek Schmidt (born 1968), Kansas State Senate
- Helmut Schmidt (1918–2015), Senate of Hamburg
- Suzi Schmidt (fl. 1970s–2010s), Illinois State Senate
- Trudi Schmidt (born 1938), member of the Montana Legislature
- Vicki Schmidt (born 1955), Kansas Insurance Commissioner
- Wayne Schmidt (born 1966), Michigan State Senate
- William A. Schmidt (1902–1992), Wisconsin State Senate

== See also ==
- Senator Schmitt (disambiguation)
- Senator Schmitz (disambiguation)
