= Phillips, Nebraska =

- Village
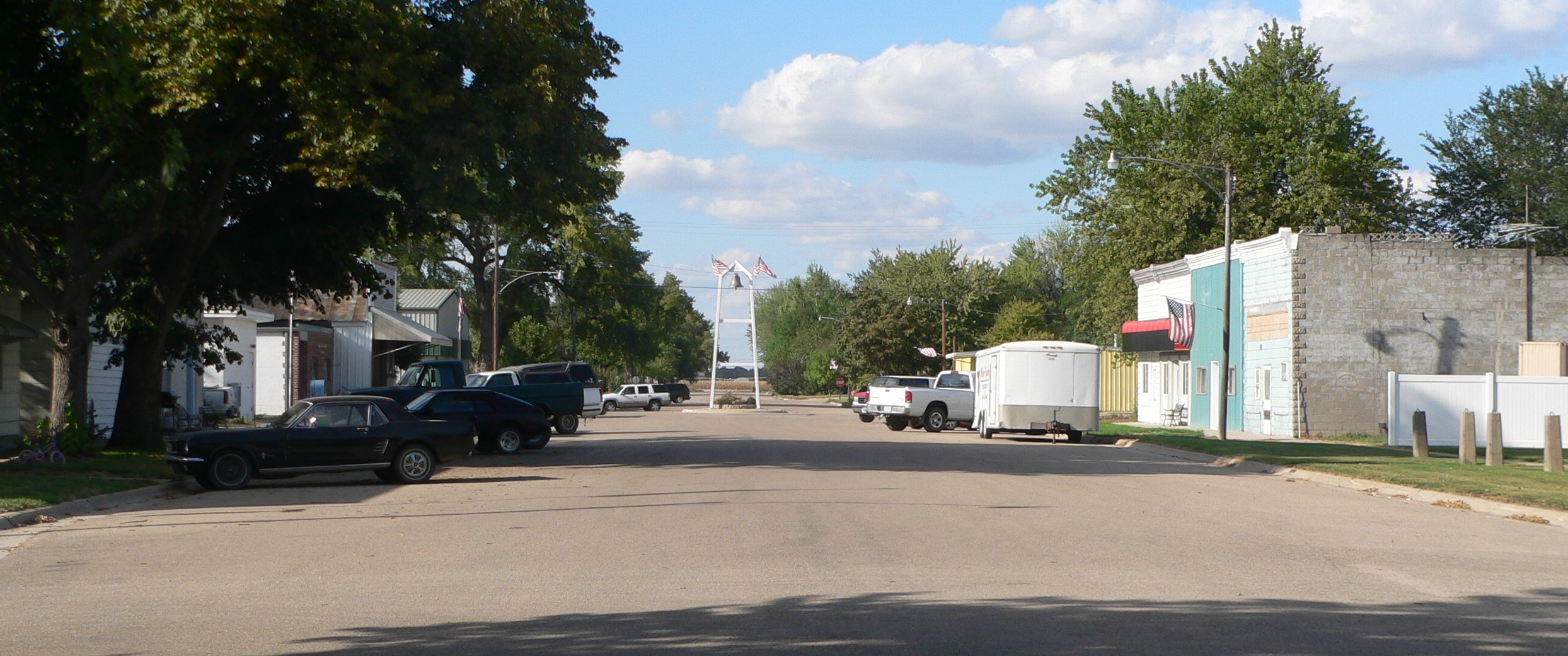
- Downtown Phillips

- Location of Phillips, Nebraska
- Coordinates: 40°53′52″N 98°12′53″W
- Country: United States
- State: Nebraska
- County: Hamilton

Area
  - Total: 0.29 sq mi (0.76 km^{2})
  - Land: 0.29 sq mi (0.76 km^{2})
  - Water: 0 sq mi (0.00 km^{2})
- Elevation: 1,890 ft (580 m)

Population (2020)
  - Total: 320
  - Density: 1,092.4/sq mi (421.79/km^{2})
- Time zone: UTC-6 (Central (CST))
  - Summer (DST): UTC-5 (CDT)
- ZIP code: 68865
- Area code: 402
- FIPS code: 31-39030
- GNIS feature ID: 2399661
- Website: phillipsne.com

Phillips is a village in Hamilton County, Nebraska, United States. As of the 2020 census, Phillips had a population of 320.

== History ==
Phillips was platted in 1884 when the Burlington and Missouri River Railroad was extended to that point. It was named for Captain R. O. Phillips, member of the town company.

== Geography ==
According to the United States Census Bureau, the village has a total area of 0.29 square miles (0.75 km^{2}), all land.

== Demographics ==
Historical population
Census	Pop.	Note	%±
1900	186		—
1910	274		47.3%
1920	274		0.0%
1930	221		−19.3%
1940	205		−7.2%
1950	190		−7.3%
1960	192		1.1%
1970	341		77.6%
1980	405		18.8%
1990	316		−22.0%
2000	336		6.3%
2010	287		−14.6%
2020	320		11.5%
U.S. Decennial Census

=== 2010 census ===
As of the census of 2010, there were 287 people, 112 households, and 78 families residing in the village. The population density was 989.7 inhabitants per square mile (382.1/km^{2}). There were 142 housing units at an average density of 489.7 per square mile (189.1/km^{2}). The racial makeup of the village was 98.6% White, 1.0% from other races, and 0.3% from two or more races. Hispanic or Latino of any race were 2.8% of the population.

There were 112 households, of which 27.7% had children under the age of 18 living with them, 53.6% were married couples living together, 10.7% had a female householder with no husband present, 5.4% had a male householder with no wife present, and 30.4% were non-families. 21.4% of all households were made up of individuals, and 4.5% had someone living alone who was 65 years of age or older. The average household size was 2.56 and the average family size was 2.95.

The median age in the village was 41.3 years. 25.1% of residents were under the age of 18; 8% were between the ages of 18 and 24; 25.8% were from 25 to 44; 30.3% were from 45 to 64; and 10.8% were 65 years of age or older. The gender makeup of the village was 50.2% male and 49.8% female.

=== 2000 census ===
As of the census of 2000, there were 336 people, 135 households, and 105 families residing in the village. The population density was 1,367.0 inhabitants per square mile (527.8/km^{2}). There were 147 housing units at an average density of 598.1 per square mile (230.9/km^{2}). The racial makeup of the village was 99.40% White, and 0.60% from two or more races. Hispanic or Latino of any race were 2.08% of the population.

There were 135 households, out of which 34.1% had children under the age of 18 living with them, 61.5% were married couples living together, 7.4% had a female householder with no husband present, and 22.2% were non-families. 18.5% of all households were made up of individuals, and 4.4% had someone living alone who was 65 years of age or older. The average household size was 2.49 and the average family size was 2.78.

In the village, the population was spread out, with 23.8% under the age of 18, 8.6% from 18 to 24, 29.5% from 25 to 44, 28.9% from 45 to 64, and 9.2% who were 65 years of age or older. The median age was 36 years. For every 100 females, there were 98.8 males. For every 100 females age 18 and over, there were 103.2 males.

As of 2000 the median income for a household in the village was $35,536, and the median income for a family was $35,714. Males had a median income of $24,519 versus $18,977 for females. The per capita income for the village was $16,090. About 5.6% of families and 7.9% of the population were below the poverty line, including 10.1% of those under age 18 and 5.0% of those age 65 or over.

== Notable person ==
- Vickie McDonald, Nebraska Legislator
