= 1998 United States House of Representatives elections in Nebraska =

- November 3, 1998

All 3 Nebraska seats to the United States House of Representatives
	Majority party	Minority party
Party	Republican	Democratic
Last election	3	0
Seats won	3	0
Seat change	Steady	Steady
Popular vote	392,736	104,568
Percentage	71.22%	26.07%

The 1998 United States House of Representatives elections in Nebraska were held on November 3, 1998, to elect the state of Nebraska's three members to the United States House of Representatives.

== Overview ==
1998 United States House of Representatives elections in Nebraska
Party	Votes	Percentage	Seats	+/–
Republican	392,736	71.22%	3	Steady
Democratic	104,568	26.07%	0	Steady
Libertarian	22,278	4.04%	0	—
Write-ins	1,397	0.25%	0	—
Totals	521,979	100.00%	3	—

== District 1 ==
Incumbent Republican Congressman Doug Bereuter ran for re-election. He was unopposed in the Republican primary and faced former State Senator Don Eret, the Democratic nominee, in the general election. Bereuter defeated Eret by a wide margin, receiving 73 percent of the vote.

=== Republican primary ===
==== Candidates ====
- Doug Bereuter, incumbent U.S. Representative

==== Results ====
Republican primary results
Party	Candidate	Votes	%
Republican	Doug Bereuter (inc.)	66,033	99.31%
Republican	Write-ins	460	0.69%
Total votes		66,493	100.00%

=== Democratic primary ===
==== Candidates ====
- Don Eret, former State Senator, 1990 Democratic candidate for Governor

==== Results ====
Democratic primary results
Party	Candidate	Votes	%
Democratic	Don Eret	30,220	98.97%
Democratic	Write-ins	313	1.03%
Total votes		30,533	100.00%

=== General election ===
==== Candidates ====
- Doug Bereuter (Republican)
- Don Eret (Democratic)

==== Results ====
1998 Nebraska's 1st congressional district general election results
Party	Candidate	Votes	%
Republican	Doug Bereuter (inc.)	136,058	73.45%
Democratic	Don Eret	48,826	26.36%
Write-ins		343	0.19%
Total votes		185,227	100.00%
Republican hold			

== District 2 ==
Incumbent Republican Congressman Jon Christensen declined to seek a third term, and instead unsuccessfully ran for Governor. Omaha City Councilman Lee Terry won the Republican primary with 40 percent of the vote and faced former television reporter Michael Scott, the Democratic nominee, in the general election. Terry defeated Scott in a landslide, winning 66 percent of the vote to Scott's 34 percent.

=== Republican primary ===
==== Candidates ====
- Lee Terry, Omaha City Councilman
- Steve Kupka, former chief of staff to Omaha Mayor Hal Daub
- Brad Kuiper, businessman
- Pat Jones, Bellevue Board of Education member
- Steven C. Laird

==== Results ====
Republican primary results
Party	Candidate	Votes	%
Republican	Lee Terry	23,769	40.16%
Republican	Steve Kupka	17,673	29.86%
Republican	Brad Kuiper	15,569	26.30%
Republican	Pat Jones	1,585	2.68%
Republican	Steven C. Laird	532	0.90%
Republican	Write-ins	64	0.11%
Total votes		59,192	100.00%

=== Democratic primary ===
==== Candidates ====
- Michael Scott, former KMTV-TV reporter
- John C. McCourt, retiree
- Jess M. Pritchett, perennial candidate
- Melvin Muhammad, social worker (dropped out)

==== Results ====
Democratic primary results
Party	Candidate	Votes	%
Democratic	Michael Scott	21,482	64.35%
Democratic	John C. McCourt	5,263	15.77%
Democratic	Jess M. Pritchett	5,126	15.36%
Democratic	Melvin Muhammad	1,126	3.37%
Democratic	Write-ins	386	1.16%
Total votes		33,383	100.00%

=== General election ===
==== Candidates ====
- Lee Terry (Republican)
- Michael Scott (Democratic)

==== Results ====
1998 Nebraska's 2nd congressional district general election results
Party	Candidate	Votes	%
Republican	Lee Terry	106,782	65.51%
Democratic	Michael Scott	55,722	34.18%
Write-ins		499	0.31%
Total votes		163,003	100.00%
Republican hold			

== District 3 ==
Incumbent Republican Congressman Bill Barrett ran for re-election to a fifth term. He did not face any major-party opposition, and was challenged by farmer Jerry Hickman, the Libertarian nominee, in the general election. Barrett won re-election with 87 percent of the vote.

=== Republican primary ===
==== Candidates ====
- Bill Barrett, incumbent U.S. Representative

==== Results ====
Republican primary results
Party	Candidate	Votes	%
Republican	Bill Barrett (inc.)	81,850	99.62%
Republican	Write-ins	316	0.38%
Total votes		82,166	100.00%

=== General election ===
==== Candidates ====
- Bill Barrett (Republican)
- Jerry Hickman (Libertarian)

==== Results ====
1998 Nebraska's 3rd congressional district general election results
Party	Candidate	Votes	%
Republican	Bill Barrett (inc.)	149,896	86.78%
Libertarian	Jerry Hickman	22,278	12.90%
Write-ins		555	0.32%
Total votes		172,729	100.00%
Republican hold			

== See also ==
- 1998 United States House of Representatives elections
