= Senator MacDonald =

Senator MacDonald may refer to:

- Allan Macdonald (1794–1862), New York State Senate
- Carol Lee MacDonald (1934–2008), Arizona State Senate
- John L. MacDonald (1838–1903), Minnesota State Senate
- Mark MacDonald (Vermont politician) (born 1942), Vermont State Senate
- Michael D. MacDonald (fl. 2010s), Michigan State Senate
- Moses Macdonald (1815–1869), Maine State Senate
- Robert J. MacDonald (1914–1987), Michigan State Senate
- Virginia B. MacDonald (1920–2008), Illinois State Senate

== See also ==
- Senator McDonald (disambiguation)
