= Don Eret =

American politician

Donald L. Eret

Member of the Nebraska Legislature from the 32nd district
- In office January 5, 1983 – January 7, 1987
- Preceded by: Sharon Apking
- Succeeded by: George Coordsen

Personal details
- Born: May 31, 1931 Dorchester, Nebraska
- Died: January 4, 2017 (aged 85) Dorchester, Nebraska
- Party: Democratic (1984–2017); Republican (before 1984)
- Spouse: Lois Arnold
- Children: 3 (Joyce, Lee, Lawrence)
- Education: University of Nebraska (B.S.)
- Occupation: Farmer, mechanical engineer

Military service
- Allegiance: United States
- Branch/service: United States Army
- Years of service: 1953–1956

Donald L. "Don" Eret (May 31, 1931 – January 4, 2017) was a Democratic politician from the state of Nebraska who served as a member of the Nebraska Legislature from the 32nd district from 1983 to 1987.

== Early life ==
Eret was born in Dorchester, Nebraska, and attended Dorchester High School. He graduated from the University of Nebraska in 1953 with a degree in agricultural engineering. Eret served in the United States Army Ordnance Corps from 1953 to 1956. He later worked as a mechanical engineer for Brown-Teledyne.

== Nebraska Legislature ==
In 1982, Eret challenged State Senator Sharon Apking in the 32nd district, which was based in south-central Nebraska and included Fillmore, Jefferson, Saline, and Thayer counties. Apking had been appointed to the Legislature in 1981 following the resignation of Senator Richard Maresh. He narrowly placed second in the primary election, receiving 26 percent of the vote to Apking's 27 percent, and they advanced to the general election, where Eret defeated her with 56 percent of the vote. Though state legislative elections in Nebraska are formally nonpartisan, Eret had been originally elected as a Republican, but switched to the Democratic Party in 1984, noting that he "was voting most often with those members who are Democrats and against those who are Republicans," and citing the state's poor agricultural economy.

Eret ran for re-election to a second term in 1986. He was challenged by former State Senator Richard Maresh, stockman George Coordsen, and farmer Michael Winter. Eret narrowly placed second in the primary, receiving 31 percent of the vote to Coordsen's 32 percent, Maresh's 29 percent, and Winters's 8 percent. He was ultimately defeated by Coordsen, receiving 44 percent of the vote to Coordsen's 56 percent.

== Post-legislative career ==
In 1990, Eret announced that he would run for Governor. He campaigned in support of establishing a state-operated grain-processing authority, which he argued would generate revenue for the state and increase the state's agricultural output. Eret ultimately placed a distant sixth place, winning just 1,295 votes and 0.78 percent of the vote.

Eret briefly launched a write-in campaign against Coordsen in 1994. In the primary election, Eret won 6 percent of the vote as a write-in candidate, but declined to compete in the general election.

Eret ran against Republican Congressman Doug Bereuter in the 1st congressional district in 1998. He won the Democratic nomination unopposed, and lost to Bereuter in a landslide in the general election, receiving just 26 percent of the vote to Bereuter's 73 percent.

In 2006, Eret ran for Secretary of State. He ran against Jay Stoddard, the 2002 Democratic nominee for Secretary of State, in the primary. He lost to Stoddard by a wide margin, receiving 32 percent of the vote to Stoddard's 68 percent.
