= Rudolf Kokes =

American politician (1911–1995)

Member of the Nebraska Legislature from the 41st district
- In office January 5, 1965 – January 3, 1973
- Preceded by: LeRoy Bahensky (redistricting)
- Succeeded by: Dennis L. Rasmussen

Personal details
- Born: May 10, 1911 Ord, Nebraska
- Died: March 25, 1995 (aged 83) Ord, Nebraska
- Party: Democratic
- Spouse(s): Martha Zulkoski (m. 1932; died 1940) Clara Silver (m. 1942; died 1984)
- Children: 4 (Harold, Reggie, Ronwald, Ruth)
- Occupation: Farmer, rancher

Rudolf Kokes (May 10, 1911 – March 25, 1995) was a Democratic politician from Nebraska who served as a member of the Nebraska Legislature from the 41st district from 1965 to 1973.

== Early life ==
Kokes was born in Ord, Nebraska, in 1911. He went to school in Valley County, and was a farmer and rancher in Ord. Kokes was a member of the Valley County Weed District Board, and served on his local school board.

== Nebraska Legislature ==
In 1964, State Senator LeRoy Bahensky, who represented the 29th district, ran for re-election in the newly created 41st district, which included Greeley, Howard, Sherman, and Valley counties. Kokes ran against him, and was joined in the nonpartisan primary by farmer Arthur Shotkoski. Kokes placed first in the primary, winning 43 percent of the vote to Bahensky's 38 percent. Bahensky and Kokes advanced to the general election. Though the race was formally nonpartisan, both Bahensky and Kokes were Democrats. Kokes ultimately defeated Bahensky in a landslide, defeating Bahensky with 60 percent of the vote.

Kokes ran for re-election in 1968, and was challenged by farmer Fred Frost and home economist Louise Corcoran. Kokes placed first in the primary election, receiving 54 percent of the vote to Frost's 29 percent and Corcoran's 17 percent. Kokes and Frost proceeded to the general election, which Kokes won, receiving 57 percent of the vote to Frost's 43 percent.

In 1972, Kokes declined to run for a third term.

== Death ==
Kokes died on March 25, 1995.
