= Donald Troudt =

American politician (1920–1985)

Member of the Nebraska Legislature from the 8th district
- In office February 20, 1970 – January 5, 1971
- Preceded by: Pat Moulton
- Succeeded by: David Stahmer

Personal details
- Born: January 31, 1920 Jewell County, Kansas
- Died: August 2, 1985 (aged 65) Millard, Nebraska
- Party: Republican
- Spouse: Mayme Johnson (m. 1941)
- Children: 2 (Thomas, Larry)
- Occupation: Salesman

Military service
- Allegiance: United States
- Branch/service: United States Army Air Corps

Donald E. Troudt (January 31, 1920 – August 2, 1985) was a Republican politician from Nebraska who served as a member of the Nebraska Legislature from the 8th district from 1970 to 1971.

== Early life ==
Troudt was born in Jewell County, Kansas, in 1920, and grew up in Superior, Nebraska, graduating from Superior High School in 1938. He served in the U.S. Army Air Corps during World War II. After returning to Nebraska, he was a salesman for the Linn Motor Company in Superior, Pontiac in Grand Island, and Northwestern Bell in Omaha, selling Yellow Pages advertising.

== Nebraska Legislature ==
In 1969, State Senator Pat Moulton declined to seek re-election in 1970, and later resigned his seat in the legislature, citing ill health. Troudt ran to succeed him in the 8th district, and Governor Norbert Tiemann appointed Troudt to serve out the remaining year of Moulton's term shortly thereafter. He was sworn in on February 20, 1970.

In the primary election, Troudt faced former Omaha School Board member David Stahmer, beauty salon owner Donald Bell, and sales manager Don Skomal. Troudt placed third in the primary, receiving 17 percent of the vote to Skomal's 36 percent and Stahler's 34 percent, and did not advance to the general election.

== Post-legislative career ==
In 1972, Troudt ran for the state legislature from the newly created 31st district, which was based in western Douglas County. He ran in a crowded primary, and faced farmer James Dickinson, college administrator Robert Gieselman, lounge owner Donald Jensen, civic activist Marjorie Lamp, building superintendent Opie Opocensky, and University of Nebraska at Omaha student Thomas Penke. Troudt placed fourth, receiving 16 percent of the vote to Lamp's 26 percent, Dickinson's 23 percent, and Jensen's 18 percent.

Troudt ran for the 31st district again in 1980, seeking to succeed retiring State Senator Neil S. Simon. In the nonpartisan primary, he faced Steve Wiitala, a high school teacher; Neal Walker, a retired businessman; George Rose, a landscaper; Russ Sawyer, a chiropractor; and Louise Abrahamson, a secretary. Troudt placed a distant fourth, winning 11 percent of the vote to Wiitala's 40 percent, Sawyer's 23 percent, and Walker's 15 percent.

In the same election cycle, Troudt ran as an uncommitted delegate from the 2nd congressional district to the Republican National Convention, but was not one of the eight delegates elected.

== Death ==
Troudt died on August 2, 1985.
