= Jerry Chizek =

American politician (1936–2014)

Member of the Nebraska Legislature from the 31st district
- In office December 4, 1984 – January 6, 1993
- Preceded by: Gordon McDonald
- Succeeded by: Kate Witek

Personal details
- Born: September 28, 1936 Omaha, Nebraska
- Died: May 26, 2014 (aged 77) Longville, Minnesota
- Party: Democratic
- Spouse: Connie Woodward (m. 1959)
- Children: 6 (Bill, Cathy, Mary, Phil, Jim, David)
- Education: University of Omaha

Military service
- Allegiance: United States
- Branch/service: United States Army
- Years of service: 1958–1960
- Unit: 101st Airborne Division

Gerald E. "Jerry" Chizek (September 28, 1936 – May 26, 2014) was a Democratic politician from Nebraska who served as a member of the Nebraska Legislature from the 31st district from 1984 to 1993.

== Early career ==
Chizek was born in Omaha, Nebraska, and graduated from Omaha South High School, later attending the University of Omaha. He served in the United States Army from 1958 to 1960 in the 101st Airborne Division. Chizek worked for Northwestern Bell, and served as the president of the Local 7400 of the Communications Workers of America.

In 1970, Chizek ran for one of two seats on the Metropolitan Utilities District Board. However, he was not nominated in the primary election and did not advance to the general election.

Upon the election of Democrat J. James Exon as Governor in 1970, he appointed Chizek as the state Labor Commissioner, succeeding Tom Doyle. Chizek served during both of Exon's terms as governor, and resigned at the end of 1978 after Republican Charles Thone was elected governor.

== Nebraska Legislature ==
In 1984, State Senator Gordon McDonald, who had been appointed to the legislature in 1983 to fill out the remainder of Steve Wiitala's term, declined to run for a full term, and recruited Chizek to succeed him. In the primary election, Chizek faced insurance agent Chuck Sigerson, the former Chairman of the Douglas County Republican Party, and McDonald's name remained on the ballot. Chizek placed first in the primary election, receiving 58 percent of the vote to Sigerson's 31 percent and McDonald's 11 percent. In the general election, Chizek defeated Sigerson by a wide margin, receiving 57 percent of the vote to Sigerson's 43 percent. After Chizek's victory, McDonald resigned from the legislature on December 3, 1984, and Governor Bob Kerrey appointed Chizek to serve out the remaining days of McDonald's term on December 4.

Chizek ran for re-election to a second term in 1988, and was challenged by David Michael Dulaney, an engineer at WOWT. Chizek won 80 percent of the vote in the primary election, and was re-election in the general election in a landslide, winning 77–23 percent.

He declined to run for a third term in 1992.

== Post-legislative career ==
After leaving the legislature, Chizek registered as a lobbyist, and in 1996, was named as the executive director of the Nebraska Sheriffs' Association. He later moved to his family's cabin in Longville, Minnesota, where he was the director of the local airport authority and was hired as a lobbyist for the Leech Lake Band of Ojibwe.

== Death ==
Chizek died of liver cancer on May 26, 2014.
