= Kate Sullivan (politician) =

American politician (born 1950)

Member of the Nebraska Legislature from the 41st district
- In office 2009–2017
- Preceded by: Vickie McDonald
- Succeeded by: Tom Briese

Personal details
- Born: March 1, 1950 (age 76)
- Party: Democratic

Kate Sullivan (born March 1, 1950, in Burwell, Nebraska) is a politician from the state of Nebraska in the Midwestern United States. In 2008, she was elected to the Nebraska Legislature, representing the 41st District.

== Early life ==
Kate Sullivan graduated from Ord High School in 1967, and got her B.S. and M.S. at the University of Nebraska–Lincoln in 1971 and 1975 respectively. She is on the board of directors of Cedar Rapids State Bank and thus is a member of the Nebraska Bankers Association and Nebraska Independent Community Bankers. She is also the president of Kokes Corporation family farm and the vice president of Bluestem Beef, Inc. Prior to her election to the legislature, she was the treasurer of Cedar Rapids School Board.

== State legislature ==
Sullivan was elected in 2008 to represent the 41st Nebraska legislative district. She was named to the Building Maintenance, Education, Government, Military and Veterans Affairs, and the Legislature's Planning Committees. She served in the legislature for eight years, succeeded by Tom Briese in 2017.
