= David Stahmer =

American politician (1927–1997)

Member of the Nebraska Legislature from the 8th district
- In office January 5, 1971 – January 8, 1975
- Preceded by: Donald Troudt
- Succeeded by: Warren Swigart

Member of the Omaha City Council from the 1st district
- In office June 8, 1981 – June 10, 1985
- Preceded by: District created
- Succeeded by: Joe Friend

Personal details
- Born: September 7, 1927 Omaha, Nebraska
- Died: November 27, 1997 (aged 70) Denver, Colorado
- Party: Democratic
- Education: University of Omaha, University of Denver (A.B.)
- Occupation: Businessman

Military service
- Allegiance: United States
- Branch/service: United States Marine Corps

David H. Stahmer (September 7, 1927 – November 27, 1997) was a Democratic politician from Nebraska who served as a member of the Nebraska Legislature from the 8th district from 1971 to 1975 and as a member of the Omaha City Council from the 1st district from 1981 to 1985.

== Early life ==
Stahmer was born in Omaha, Nebraska, in 1927. He attended Omaha public schools and then attended the University of Omaha before graduating from the University of Denver with his bachelor's degree in 1950. After returning to Omaha, he worked for Industrial Electrical Works, which his father founded. Stahmer served in the Marine Corps and the Navy Reserve.

In 1961, Stahmer ran for the Omaha City Council for one of seven at-large seats. He placed ninth in the primary election, and advanced to the general election, where he narrowly lost, placing eighth.

Stahmer was elected to the Omaha School Board in 1962, but resigned in 1964 to run for the state legislature.

== Nebraska Legislature ==
In 1964, following redistricting, Stahmer ran for the state legislature from the 8th district. He faced a crowded, fifteen-candidate field, and narrowly placed second, winning 18 percent to Pat Moulton's 33 percent. They advanced to the general election, which Moulton won in a landslide, defeating Stahmer with 65 percent of the vote.

Moulton declined to seek another term in 1970, and resigned in 1969 due to ill health. Stahmer ran to succeed him. In the nonpartisan primary, Stahmer faced Donald Bell, the owner of a beauty salon and modeling school; Don Skomal, the sales manager for an insurance company; and Donald Troudt, a telephone company salesman. During the campaign, Governor Norbert Tiemann appointed Troudt to serve out the remaining year of Moulton's term. Stahmer narrowly placed second in the primary, receiving 34 percent of the vote to Skomal's 36 percent, while Troudt placed third with 17 percent. In the general election, Stahmer defeated Skomal, winning 58 percent of the vote to Skomal's 42 percent.

== Post-legislative career ==
In 1974, Stahmer declined to seek a second term, and instead ran for State Auditor. In the Democratic primary, Stahmer faced Pat Daughtery, who ran a collection agency, and former State Treasurer Richard Larsen. He placed third in the primary, receiving 29 percent of the vote to Larsen's 37 percent and Daugherty's 34 percent.

Stahmer ran for the Omaha City Council from the newly created 1st district in 1981. The 1981 elections were the first to take place under districts following the passage of a state law in 1979 that required district-level elections. Prior to the primary election, Stahmer filed a lawsuit against the districts, which he argued were "gerrymandered" to favor the incumbent councilmembers. Stahmer dropped his challenge on February 18, 1981, after a district court judge refused to halt the use of the district boundaries.

In the primary election, Stahmer faced seventeen opponents, including incumbent City Councilwoman Mary Kay Green. He placed first in the primary, winning 36 percent of the vote, and advanced to the general election with Dorothy Daley, a teacher and civic activist who received 26 percent. He narrowly defeated Daley in the general election, winning 51–49 percent.

Stahmer developed a reputation for idiosyncratic ideas on the City Council, and was referred to as an "adrenalin pill" and "idea person" for proposing controversial policies. He declined to seek re-election in 1985, explaining that he "never believed in running for the same job twice," so that elected bodies could "change personalities."

== Death ==
Stahmer died on November 27, 1997.
