= Pat Moulton =

American politician (1899–1970)

Member of the Nebraska Legislature from the 8th district
- In office January 5, 1965 – December 16, 1969
- Preceded by: Eugene Mahoney (redistricted)
- Succeeded by: Donald Troudt

Personal details
- Born: January 22, 1899 Fonda, Iowa
- Died: December 8, 1970 (aged 71) Omaha, Nebraska
- Party: Republican
- Spouse: Lillian E. Johnson (m. 1928)
- Children: 2 (Susanne, Bruce)
- Education: University of Nebraska (B.S.)
- Occupation: Engineer

Military service
- Allegiance: United States
- Branch/service: United States Army

C. F. "Pat" Moulton (January 22, 1899 – December 8, 1970) was a Republican politician from Nebraska who served as a member of the Nebraska Legislature from the 8th district from 1965 to 1969.

== Early life ==
Moulton was born in Fonda, Iowa, in 1899. He attended the University of Nebraska, receiving his bachelor's degree in m mechanical engineering. He served in the U.S. Army during World War I, and was a high school and adult education teacher. In In 1926, Moulton joined the Nebraska Power Company, which was later acquired by the Omaha Public Power District. He became the general manager of OPPD in 1959, and retired in 1964. Following his retirement, he joined the Leo A. Daly Company's power engineering department.

== Nebraska Legislature ==
In 1964, Moulton ran for the legislature from the newly created 8th district. He placed first in the crowded primary, which included fifteen candidates, winning 33 percent of the vote. Moulton advanced to the general election with former Omaha School Board member David Stahmer. Though the race was formally nonpartisan, Moulton was a Republican and Stahmer was a Democrat. Moulton defeated Stahmer in a landslide, receiving 65 percent of the vote to Stahmer's 35 percent.

Moulton ran for re-election to a four-year term in 1966, and was challenged by Clarence Hurlbut, an engineer. In the primary election, Moulton placed first by a wide margin, receiving 81 percent of the vote to Hurlbut's 19 percent. In the general election, he defeated Hurlbut by a wide margin, winning 74 percent of the vote.

In 1969, Moulton resigned from the legislature, citing ill health. Governor Norbert Tiemann appointed Donald Troudt, a candidate to succeed Moulton, as his successor in 1970.

== Death ==
Moulton died on December 8, 1970.
