= Floyd Vrtiska =

American politician (1926–2020)

Acting Chair of the Executive Board of the Nebraska Legislature
- In office 1995–1996
- Preceded by: Tim Hall
- Succeeded by: George Coordsen

Member of the Nebraska Legislature from the 1st district
- In office January 6, 1993 – January 5, 2005
- Preceded by: Spencer Morrissey
- Succeeded by: Lavon Heidemann

Personal details
- Born: October 12, 1926 Table Rock, Nebraska
- Died: September 15, 2020 (aged 93) Lincoln, Nebraska
- Party: Republican

Floyd Vrtiska (October 12, 1926 – September 15, 2020) was an American politician who served in the Nebraska Legislature from the 1st district from 1993 to 2005.

== Background ==
Vrtiska was born in Table Rock, Nebraska and graduated from Table Rock High School. He was a farmer and raised cattle. Vrtiska served as mayor and fire chief of Table Rock. He also served on the Pawnee County Commission.

== Death ==
He died on September 15, 2020, in Lincoln, Nebraska at age 93.
