= Dennis L. Rasmussen =

American politician (1929–2018)

Member of the Nebraska Legislature from the 41st district
- In office January 3, 1973 – January 5, 1979
- Preceded by: Rudolf Kokes
- Succeeded by: Donald Wagner

Personal details
- Born: May 13, 1929 Cotesfield, Nebraska
- Died: November 17, 2018 (aged 89) Wahoo, Nebraska
- Party: Republican
- Spouse: Maxine Yax (m. 1950)
- Children: 4 (Cindy, Steven, Victoria, Mary Jo)
- Education: Grand Island Business College
- Occupation: Farmer and rancher

Dennis L. Rasmussen (May 13, 1929 – November 17, 2018) was a Republican politician from Nebraska who served as a member of the Nebraska Legislature from the 41st district from 1973 to 1979, and was a member of the Nebraska Public Power District Board of Directors from 1997 to 2015.

== Early life ==
Rasmussen was born in Cotesfield, Nebraska, in 1929, and graduated from Scotia High School. He attended Grand Island Business College, and received an advanced degree in business accounting. He was a farmer in Ord.

== Nebraska Legislature ==
In 1972, State Senator Rudolf Kokes declined to seek re-election to a third term. Rasmussen ran to succeed Kokes in the 41st district, which was based in central Nebraska. He faced a crowded primary, and was opposed by farmers Frederick Frost and Arthur Shotkoski, contractor Mike Bernt, minister J. H. Schroeder, attorney John Sullivan, and insurance agent William Mayne. Rasmussen placed first in the primary election, winning 28 percent of the vote to Schroeder's 27 percent. They advanced to the general election, which Rasmussen won by a wide margin, receiving 59 percent of the vote to Schroeder's 41 percent.

Rasmussen ran for re-election in 1976, and was elected unopposed.

In 1978, Rasmussen "privately acknowledged" that he was considering resigning from the legislature, with the winner of the 1978 gubernatorial election potentially altering the partisan composition of the legislature through the ability to appoint Rasmussen's replacement. Following the victory of Republican Charles Thone in the election, Rasmussen announced that he would resign from the legislature to become a lobbyist. He left office on January 5, 1979, and was succeeded by fellow Republican Donald Wagner.

== Post-legislative career ==
Rasmussen ran for the Nebraska Public Power District Board of Directors from subdivision 1, which was based in Lancaster County, in 1996. Rasmussen challenged incumbent John Hamilton for re-election, and was joined by former State Senator Wally Barnett in the primary. Barnett narrowly placed first in the primary, winning 40 percent of the vote and 92 more votes than Rasmussen, and they proceeded to the general election, which Rasmussen won with 55 percent of the vote.

He was re-elected unopposed in 2002. In 2008, he was challenged by Paul Liess, the retired general manager of the Twin Valleys Public Power District. Rasmussen defeated Liess by a wide margin, winning 73 percent of the vote to Liess's 27 percent. Rasmussen did not seek re-election to a fourth term in 2014, and was succeeded by Barry DeKay.

== Death ==
Rasmussen died on November 17, 2018.
