= Carson Rogers =

American politician (1924–2005)

Member of the Nebraska Legislature from the 41st district
- In office January 9, 1985 – January 6, 1993
- Preceded by: Donald Wagner
- Succeeded by: Jerry Schmitt

Personal details
- Born: February 1, 1924 Ord, Nebraska
- Died: May 26, 2005 (aged 81) Ord, Nebraska
- Party: Republican
- Spouse: Alice Beran (m. 1950)
- Children: 5 (Roxann, Russell, Rhonda, Regina, R. Jay)
- Occupation: Hog farmer

Carson Rogers (February 1, 1924 – May 26, 2005) was a Republican politician and hog farmer from Nebraska who served as a member of the Nebraska Legislature from the 41st district from 1985 to 1993.

== Early life ==
Rogers was born in Ord, Nebraska, and graduated from Ord High School. He owned and operated a pig farm, and was the president of Rogers Hog Farms, Inc. Rogers was elected the president of the Nebraska Pork Producers in 1975.

In 1972, Rogers ran for the Valley County Board of Supervisors against incumbent Democrat Edmund Huffman in the 2nd district, and defeated him by a wide margin. He ran for re-election in 1976 in the 4th district, and was defeated in the Republican primary by Richard Peterson.

== Nebraska Legislature ==
In 1984, State Senator Donald Wagner declined to seek re-election, and Rogers ran to succeed him in the 41st district, which included Custer, Garfield, Greeley, Hall, Howard, Loup, Sherman, Valley, and Wheeler counties. However, Rogers simultaneously ran for re-election to the County Board of Supervisors and was removed from the ballot by the state Secretary of State for violating a law prohibiting a candidate from seeking two offices simultaneously. Rogers subsequently announced that he would continue his legislative campaign as a write-in candidate. In the primary election, he faced Duane Altstadt, a newspaper publisher; Duane Berck, a U.S. Air Force veteran; Harold Rademacher, the former chairman of the Sherman County Agricultural and Stabilization Committee; farmer Arthur Shotkoski; and Custer County Supervisor Burdett Thompson. Rademacher narrowly placed first in the primary, winning 26 percent of the vote to Rogers's 23 percent. In the general election, Rogers defeated Rademacher, winning 56 percent of the vote to his 44 percent.

Rogers ran for re-election in 1988. He was challenged by Jake Bredthauer, a U.S. Army veteran. In the primary election, Rogers placed first by a wide margin, winning 76 percent of the vote to Rogers's 24 percent. He defeated Bredthauer in a landslide in the general election, winning a second term, 72–28 percent.

In 1992, Rogers ran for a third term and was challenged by Bredthauer, in a rematch of their 1988 contest; farmer Jerry Hickman; and Nebraska State Patrol officer Jerry Schmitt. Rogers's opponents attacked his vote in favor of the state's 1992 mandatory seat-belt law. In the primary election, Rogers narrowly placed second, receiving 39 percent of the vote to Schmitt's 41 percent. They advanced to the general election.

On election night, Schmitt appeared to narrowly defeat Rogers, and when Schmitt's margin of victory was confirmed at 30 votes, an automatic recount take place. Rogers filed a lawsuit to disqualify Schmitt, arguing that as an officer in the State Patrol, he was constitutionally barred from holding office under the state constitution's prohibition on dual officeholding. A judge declined to disqualify Schmitt, and the recount confirmed Schmitt's victory by 36 votes. Rogers filed a contest with the state legislature, seeking to have it seat him instead of Schmitt, but the legislature seated Schmitt and unanimously rejected Rogers's contest.

== Death ==
Rogers died on May 26, 2005.
