= Mervin Bedford =

American politician (1902–1960)

Member of the Nebraska Legislature from the 23rd district
- In office January 4, 1955 – January 6, 1959
- Preceded by: C. C. Lillibridge
- Succeeded by: Joe Vosoba

Personal details
- Born: February 14, 1902 Bee, Nebraska
- Died: October 29, 1960 (aged 58) near Shickley, Nebraska
- Party: Democratic
- Spouse: Zelma Willmore (m. 1929; died 1956)
- Children: 1
- Education: Creighton University
- Occupation: Druggist, automobile dealer

Mervin V. Bedford (February 14, 1902 – October 29, 1960) was a Democratic politician from Nebraska who served as a member of the Nebraska Legislature from the 23rd district from 1955 to 1959.

== Early life ==
Bedford was born in Bee, Nebraska, in 1902, and graduated from Geneva High School. He attended Creighton University, and worked as a businessman in Geneva, owning and operating an automobile and implement dealership.

In 1940, Bedford was nominated by the Geneva Township Democratic Caucus as its candidate for justice of the peace, but he was defeated by the Republican nominee, Eric Johnson.

== Nebraska Legislature ==
In 1954, Bedford ran for the state legislature from the 23rd district. Incumbent State Senator C. C. Lillibridge announced that he would not seek re-election to a fifth term, citing "health conditions," but Lillibridge abruptly entered the race after newspaper publisher Wallace Weeks, who had announced his candidacy, ended his campaign. In the nonpartisan primary, Bedford narrowly placed second, winning 39 percent of the vote and finishing 2 votes behind Lillibridge, and they advanced to the general election.

The general election between Lillibridge and Bedford was close, and the election night results showed Lillibridge losing to Bedford by fewer than 20 votes. The official results concluded that Bedford defeated Lillibridge by 9 votes, and Lillibridge contested the result, seeking a recount before the legislature. Bedford was preliminarily seated by the legislature while the votes were recounted. The recount ultimately showed that Bedford defeated Lillibridge by 31 votes.

Bedford ran for re-election in 1956, and was challenged by Tobias School Board member and farmer Harry Miller and Francis Craig. Bedford placed first in the primary by a wide margin, winning 59 percent of the vote to Miller's 24 percent and Craig's 17 percent. He and Miller advanced to the general election, which Bedford won, receiving 61 percent of the vote to Miller's 39 percent.

In 1958, Bedford ran for a third term. He was challenged by Deputy Saline County Attorney Joe Vosoba, a fellow Democrat. Vosoba placed first in the primary, receiving 64 percent of the vote to Bedford's 36 percent. In the general election, Vosoba defeated Bedford in a landslide, winning 66–34 percent.

== Death ==
Bedford died on October 29, 1960.
