= Theodore Wenzlaff =

American politician (1903–1988)

Member of the Nebraska Legislature from the 32nd district
- In office December 5, 1968 – January 7, 1971
- Preceded by: Eric Rasmussen
- Succeeded by: Richard Maresh

Personal details
- Born: January 8, 1903 Yankton, South Dakota
- Died: June 21, 1988 (aged 85) Sutton, Nebraska
- Party: Republican
- Spouse: Frieda Griess (m. 1927)
- Children: 3 (Marianne, William, Kathleen)
- Education: United States Military Academy (B.S.); Hastings College (B.A.)

Military service
- Allegiance: United States
- Branch/service: United States Army
- Years of service: 1926–1955

Theodore Charles Wenzlaff (January 8, 1903 – June 21, 1988) was a Republican politician from Nebraska who served as a member of the Nebraska Legislature from the 32nd district from 1968 to 1971.

== Early life ==
Wenzlaff was born in Yankton, South Dakota, and grew up in Sutton, Nebraska, graduating from Sutton High School in 1921. He attended the United States Military Academy, graduating in 1926. Wenzlaff joined the U.S. Army in 1926, and served until 1955. Wenzlaff served for four years during World War II and during the Korean War, and retired as a colonel in 1955. Upon returning to Nebraska, he taught at Sutton High School.

In 1959, Wenzlaff ran for the Sutton City Council, and was elected unopposed. He ran for a second term in 1961 and was defeated.

== Nebraska Legislature ==
In 1968, State Senator Eric Rasmussen was elected to the Nebraska Public Service Commission. Rasmussen resigned his seat in the legislature on December 5, 1968, so that Governor Norbert Tiemann could appoint a successor prior to the legislature's special session beginning on December 9, 1968. Tiemann appointed Wenzlaff to serve out the remainder of Rasmussen's term. Though state legislative races were formally nonpartisan, Rasmussen and Wenzlaff were both Republicans, and his appointment did not alter the composition of the body.

Wenzlaff ran for a full term in 1970. He was challenged by newspaper publisher Al Bonta, farmer Melvin Kuska, Milligan School Board member Richard Maresh, and grain dealer Larry Logan. Wenzlaff placed third in the primary, winning 17 percent of the vote to Maresh's 29 percent and Ruska's 21 percent. Wenzlaff was one of three senators, two of which were appointed by Tiemann, to lose renomination in the primary election.

== Death ==
Wenzlaff died on June 21, 1988.
