= Joe Vosoba =

American politician (1929–2025)

Member of the Nebraska Legislature from the 23rd district
- In office January 7, 1959 – January 9, 1963
- Preceded by: Mervin Bedford
- Succeeded by: Eric Rasmussen

Personal details
- Born: August 25, 1929 Saline County, Nebraska, U.S.
- Died: January 15, 2025 (aged 95)
- Party: Democratic
- Spouse: Kathryn Vosoba (m. 1957)
- Children: 2
- Education: University of Nebraska–Lincoln (BS, JD)

Joe Thomas Vosoba (August 25, 1929 – January 15, 2025) was an American lawyer and politician from Saline County, Nebraska.

== Life and career ==
Vosoba was born August 25, 1929, in Saline County. He received a Bachelor of Science and Juris Doctor from the University of Nebraska–Lincoln, after which he enlisted in the U.S. Army and served in the 101st Airborne Division during the Korean War.

In 1958, Vosoba was elected to the first of two terms in the Nebraska Legislature, defeating incumbent Mervin Bedford.

Following his time in the Nebraska Legislature, Vosoba practiced law, becoming a senior partner. As a member of the Nebraska Bar Association, he served in the Bar's House of Delegates, Executive Council, and Judicial Council twice each. He was also on the Disciplinary Review Board for many years.

In addition to his work, Vosoba was Robert F. Kennedy's campaign manager for the first congressional district and later served on the Nebraska advisory board for John F. Kennedy. He also co-founded and led several local organizations, including the Nebraska Czechs and the Saline County Historical Society.

On May 25, 1957, Vosoba married his wife Kathryn, with whom he ultimately had two children: Debbi and Beth.

Vosoba died on January 15, 2025, at the age of 95.

== Electoral history ==
=== 1958 general election ===
Nebraska Legislature, District 23, 1958 general election * denotes incumbent Source:
Party	Candidate	Votes	%
Non-partisan	Joe Vosoba	5,271	66.4
Non-partisan	Mervin Bedford *	2,674	33.6
Total votes		7,942	100
