= Tim Hall (Nebraska politician) =

American politician

Chair of the Executive Board of the Nebraska Legislature
- In office January 6, 1993 – August 13, 1995
- Preceded by: Jerome Warner
- Succeeded by: Floyd Vrtiska (acting)

Member of the Nebraska Legislature from the 7th district
- In office August 9, 1984 – August 13, 1995
- Preceded by: Karen Kilgarin
- Succeeded by: John Hilgert

Personal details
- Born: March 8, 1956 (age 70) Omaha, Nebraska
- Party: Democratic
- Education: Drake University; University of Nebraska at Omaha; Creighton University School of Law

Tim Hall (born March 8, 1956) is a Democratic politician and insurance executive from Nebraska who served as a member of the Nebraska Legislature from the 7th district from 1984 to 1995 and as chair of the executive board from 1993 to 1995.

== Early life ==
Hall was born in Omaha, Nebraska, in 1956. He graduated from Paul VI High School and later attended Drake University and the University of Nebraska at Omaha. Hall worked as the director of development for United Catholic Social Services. He later worked as the director of public affairs for the Mutual Protective/Medico Life Insurance Companies and attended the Creighton University School of Law.

== Nebraska Legislature ==
In 1984, State Senator Karen Kilgarin resigned from the legislature and ended her re-election campaign to become the Lincoln bureau chief for KETV. Hall subsequently filed to run in the general election, and faced real estate investor Gene Buzzello, who had previously filed to run against Kilgarin in the primary, and Carol Kersenbrock Keenan, the wife of County Coroner James Keenan. After interviewing the three candidates, Governor Bob Kerrey appointed Hall to serve out the remainder of the seat, though he did not formally endorse him in the general election. Hall was sworn in on August 9, 1984. Hall ultimately won the general election, receiving 50 percent of the vote to Buzzello's 31 percent and Keenan's 19 percent.

Hall ran for re-election to a second term in 1988, and was challenged by Buzzello, line cook James Edward Parsons, and retired secretary Betty Dworak. in the primary election, Hall placed first by a wide margin, receiving 57 percent of the vote to Buzzello's 22 percent, Dworak's 15 percent, and Parsons's 6 percent. Hall and Buzzello advanced to the general election, where Hall won in a landslide, winning 73–27 percent.

In 1992, Hall ran for a third term, and was challenged by four opponents: custodian P.J. Asta, retired salesman Bernie Barrett, anti-abortion activist Teresa Damasauskas, and Creighton medical professor Lou Safranek. Hall placed first in the primary, winning 56 percent of the vote to Damasauskas's 18 percent, and they advanced to the general election. Hall won the general election by a wide margin, winning re-election 59–41 percent.

Hall was unanimously elected Chairman of the Legislature's executive board in 1993. He was re-elected in 1995 over State Senator Kate Witek, 36–11.

== Post-legislative career ==
In 1995, Governor Ben Nelson appointed Hall as the deputy director of the Nebraska Department of Insurance, and he resigned from the legislature on August 13, 1995. Nelson appointed Hall as the director of the department in 1997.

When Mike Johanns was elected Governor in 1998, Hall stepped down as director.

After leaving the department, Hall became president of the Mutual Protective Insurance Company.
