= Jack Romans =

American politician (1914–1982)

Member of the Nebraska Public Service Commission from the 5th district
- In office January 9, 1975 – February 4, 1982
- Preceded by: John Swanson
- Succeeded by: Robert O. Brayton

Member of the Nebraska Legislature from the 29th district
- In office January 6, 1959 – January 1, 1963
- Preceded by: LeRoy Bahensky
- Succeeded by: LeRoy Bahensky

Personal details
- Born: August 6, 1914 North Loup, Nebraska
- Died: February 4, 1982 (aged 67) Omaha, Nebraska
- Party: Republican
- Spouse: Glea Porter (m. 1933)
- Children: 4 (Carolynn, Ronald, Gay, Harry)
- Occupation: Trucking

Jack Romans (August 6, 1914 – February 4, 1982) was a Republican politician from Nebraska who served as a member of the Nebraska Public Service Commission from the 5th district from 1975 to 1982, and of the Nebraska Legislature from the 29th district from 1959 to 1963.

== Early career ==
Romans was born in North Loup, Nebraska, and graduated from Ord High School in 1932. He owned and operated Romans Freight Lines, and testified before the legislature in 1958 that the Teamsters organized a boycott against his company over allegations that he refused to allow his employees to join the union. In 1950, Romans was elected to the Valley County Board of Supervisors.

== Nebraska Legislature ==
In 1954, when incumbent State Senator Hugh Carson declined to seek re-election, Romans ran to succeed him in the 29th district, which included Greeley, Howard, Valley, and Wheeler counties in central Nebraska. He faced LeRoy Bahensky, a farmer, and Arnold Tuning, the former Superintendent of the Arcadia Public Schools, in the nonpartisan primary. Bahensky placed first in the primary, winning 46 percent of the vote to Romans's 30 percent, and they advanced to the general election. Bahensky defeated Romans in a landslide in the general election, winning 68–32 percent.

Bahensky declined to seek a second term in 1958, and Roman ran to succeed him. In the primary election, he faced a rematch against Tuning, as well as car dealer Clayton Peterson and farmer Henry Lange. Romans narrowly placed first, winning 26 percent of the vote and advancing to the general election against Petersen, who played second with 25 percent. Romans ultimately defeated Petersen, winning 54 percent of the vote to his 46 percent.

Romans ran for re-election in 1960, and was challenged by Tuning in the primary. Romans placed first in the primary by a wide margin, winning 60 percent of the vote to Tuning's 40 percent, and they advanced to the general election, where Romans defeated Tuning with 57 percent of the vote.

In 1962, Romans ran for re-election to a third term and was challenged by Bahensky. Romans placed first in the primary, winning 52 percent of the vote to Bahensky's 36 percent, and they both advanced to the general election. Bahensky narrowly defeated Romans in the general election, winning 51–49 percent.

== 1964 gubernatorial campaign ==
In 1964, Romans announced that he would challenge incumbent Democratic Governor Frank B. Morrison for re-election. He faced Lieutenant Governor Dwight Burney in the Republican primary, and attacked Burney for supporting a sales tax. Burney defeated Romans in a landslide, receiving 59 percent of the vote to Romans's 32 percent. Burney was ultimately defeated by Morrison in the general election.

== Nebraska Public Service Commission ==
In 1974, Romans ran for the Nebraska Public Service Commission, challenging incumbent Commissioner John Swanson in the Republican primary. Romans was joined in the primary by State Treasurer Wayne Swanson, former State Senator Lester Harsh, and cattleman Rex Haberman. Romans won a narrow plurality in the primary, receiving 30 percent of the vote to Haberman's 23 percent. In the general election, Romans faced independent Ralph Miller, a railroad machinist, and defeated him in a landslide, winning 66 percent of the vote.

Romans ran for re-election in 1980, and was challenged by former Congressman Donald McGinley, who served on the Industrial Relations Commission. Romans defeated McGinley, winning 57 percent of the vote.

Romans died on February 4, 1982, several days after undergoing heart surgery.
