= Richard N. McDonald =

American politician (1948–2001)

Member of the Nebraska Legislature from the 41st district
- In office January 3, 2001 – August 5, 2001
- Preceded by: Jerry Schmitt
- Succeeded by: Vickie McDonald

Personal details
- Born: May 7, 1948 Loup City, Nebraska
- Died: August 5, 2001 (aged 53) Grand Island, Nebraska
- Party: Republican
- Spouse: Vickie McDonald (m. 2000)
- Children: 4 (Brenet, Kristin, Monica, Julia)
- Education: University of Nebraska–Lincoln (B.S.)

Richard N. "Rick" McDonald (May 7, 1948 – August 5, 2001) was a Republican politician who served as a member of the Nebraska Legislature from the 41st district for eight months in 2001.

== Early career ==
McDonald was born in Loup City, Nebraska, and graduated from Boelus High School in Boelus. He attended the University of Nebraska, graduating with his bachelor's degree in education in 1971. McDonald was an English teacher and football coach at Centura Public School from 1970 to 1971 and from 1973 to 1979. From 1971 to 1973, he served in the United States Army, and was stationed in San Francisco. In 1979, McDonald took over his family's ranching operation in Rockville.

== Nebraska Legislature ==
In 2000, McDonald ran for the Nebraska Legislature from the 41st district, following incumbent Senator Jerry Schmitt's decision not to seek re-election. In the primary election, he faced physician Richard Hanisch, farmer Errol Wells, and financial analyst Don Smith. McDonald placed second in the primary, receiving 36 percent of the vote to Wells's 38 percent, and they advanced to the general election.

During the general election campaign, McDonald suffered weight loss and severe fatigue, and was ultimately diagnosed with kidney cancer. He underwent a nephrectomy at the Mayo Clinic and resumed his campaign. McDonald narrowly defeated Wells, winning 50.3 percent of the vote to Wells's 49.7 percent.

Prior to the beginning McDonald's legislative service, doctors discovered a tumor on his spleen, He underwent surgery to remove his spleen after the session started, and returned to the session shortly thereafter. In March, he planned to undergo a third surgery, but instead received a four-week long neutron therapy treatment in Batavia, Illinois, and participated in the legislative session over the internet. McDonald returned to the session in May.

On August 5, 2001, McDonald died. His widow, Vickie McDonald, was appointed by Governor Mike Johanns as his successor in the legislature.
