= Neil Simon (Nebraska politician) =

American politician (1946–2001)

Member of the Nebraska Legislature from the 31st district
- In office January 5, 1977 – January 7, 1981
- Preceded by: James Dickinson
- Succeeded by: Steve Wiitala

Personal details
- Born: August 5, 1946 Omaha, Nebraska
- Died: November 4, 2001 (aged 55) Daytona Beach, Florida
- Party: Democratic
- Education: University of Iowa; University of Nebraska at Omaha
- Occupation: Business executive

Neil Stuart Simon (August 5, 1946 – November 4, 2001) was a Democratic politician from Nebraska who served as a member of the Nebraska Legislature from the 31st district from 1977 to 1981.

== Early life ==
Simon was born in Omaha, Nebraska, in 1946, and graduated from Omaha Central High School. He attended the University of Iowa and graduated from the University of Nebraska at Omaha with a bachelor's degree in English in 1969. Simon worked for his family's company, the Simon Meats Company, as a regional sales director, and was politically active in the Nebraska Democratic Party, serving as the chairman of Jimmy Carter's 1976 presidential campaign in Nebraska.

== Nebraska Legislature ==
In 1976, Simon challenged incumbent State Senator James Dickinson for re-election in the 31st district, which was based in western Douglas County. In the nonpartisan primary, he was joined by Metropolitan Technical Community College student Bernard Cochran and former Omaha Police Department officer Michael Brown. Simon placed second, receiving 26 percent of the vote to Dickinson's 50 percent. They proceeded to the general election, which Simon narrowly won, defeating Dickinson with 52 percent.

Simon declined to seek re-election in 1980, citing the "degrading and totally unrealistic pay," which he said made it "financially impossible" for him "to continue to serve."

== Post-legislative career ==
Following his announcement that he would retire from the legislature, Simon launched a campaign for one of three seats on the Millard School Board. He was nominated in the primary election, but ended his campaign on September 11, 1980, citing "substantially increased business and personal commitments."

In 1990, Simon moved to the Eggers Consulting Company, where he first worked as an executive recruiter. He relocated to Arizona in 1996, and to Florida in 2001, and was the vice president of Eggers' insurance division.

== Death ==
Simon died on November 4, 2001.
