= Patrick Venditte =

American politician

Member of the Nebraska Legislature from the 7th district
- In office January 5, 1977 – January 7, 1981
- Preceded by: William Skarda
- Succeeded by: Karen Kilgarin

Personal details
- Born: September 16, 1945 (age 80) Omaha, Nebraska
- Party: Democratic
- Spouse: Janet Nowaczyk (m. 1968)
- Education: Peru State College (B.S.); University of Nebraska Omaha (M.S.)
- Occupation: Teacher

Patrick "Pat" Venditte (born 1945) is a teacher and Democratic politician from Nebraska who served as a member of the Nebraska Legislature from the 7th district from 1977 to 1981.

== Early career ==
Venditte was born in Omaha, Nebraska, and attended Cathedral High School. He graduated from Peru State College with his bachelor's degree in 1967 and the University of Nebraska Omaha with his master's degree in 1970. Venditte has worked as a driver's education instructor, and owns the Cornhusker Driving School.

== Nebraska Legislature ==
In 1976, when incumbent State Senator William Skarda declined to seek re-election, Venditte ran to succeed him in the 7th district, which was based in South Omaha. Venditte faced a crowded primary, and placed first with 31 percent, advancing to the general election against former Omaha Board of Education member Fritz Stank, who placed second with 26 percent. Venditte ultimately defeated Stanek by a narrow margin, 52–48 percent.

Venditte ran for re-election in 1980, and was challenged by Karen Kilgarin, a real estate agent, and Jake McCourt, a U.S. Marine Corps veteran and perennial candidate. In the primary election, Venditte placed first, winning 50 percent to Kilgarin's 40 percent. However, in the general election, Kilgarin ultimately defeated Venditte, winning 55 percent of the vote to his 45 percent.

== Post-legislative career ==
In 1981, Venditte ran for the Omaha City Council from the 3rd district, and placed third in the primary election, losing to Walt Calinger and Mary Ann Hayes. He ran for the City Council again in 1985, but again placed third in the primary, losing to Calinger and C. Bruce Davis.

Calinger was appointed mayor in 1988, and Venditte applied to fill his vacancy on the City Council, but was ultimately not selected. He ran against Councilman Subby Anzaldo, who was appointed to replace Calinger, in 1989. He placed second to Anzaldo in the primary election, winning 34 percent of the vote to Anzaldo's 42 percent, and they advanced to the general election. Anzaldo ultimately defeated Venditte, winning 55 percent of the vote to Venditte's 44 percent.

In 2021, following the death of Douglas County Commissioner Mike Boyle, Venditte applied to fill his vacancy on the Board of Commissioners, but was ultimately not selected.
