= Gordon McDonald (Nebraska politician) =

American politician (1935–2020)

Gordon L. McDonald

Member of the Nebraska Legislature from the 31st district
- In office September 6, 1983 – December 3, 1984
- Preceded by: Steve Wiitala
- Succeeded by: Jerry Chizek

Personal details
- Born: November 18, 1935
- Died: October 9, 2020 (aged 84)
- Party: Democratic
- Spouse: Sharon Boll
- Children: 5 (Todd, Michael, Lori, Debbie, Shari)

Gordon Lee McDonald (November 18, 1935 – October 9, 2020) was a Democratic politician and labor leader from Nebraska who served as a member of the Nebraska Legislature from the 31st district from 1983 to 1984.

McDonald was elected president of the Nebraska AFL-CIO in 1979, and served until 1999. In 1983, following the appointment of State Senator Steve Wiitala as Douglas County Election Commissioner, Governor Bob Kerrey appointed McDonald to serve out the remainder of Wiitala's term. He declined to seek election to a full term in 1984, instead recruiting and endorsing former State Labor Commissioner Jerry Chizek as his successor, though McDonald's name remained on the ballot. Following Chizek's election, McDonald resigned from the legislature on December 3, 1984, and Governor Bob Kerrey appointed Chizek to serve out the remaining weeks of his term.

McDonald died on October 9, 2020.
