= Steve Wiitala =

American politician

Douglas County Election Commissioner
- In office January 1, 1984 – December 31, 1987
- Preceded by: Lee Terry
- Succeeded by: Vickie Florine

Member of the Nebraska Legislature from the 31st district
- In office January 7, 1981 – September 1, 1983
- Preceded by: Neil Simon
- Succeeded by: Gordon McDonald

Personal details
- Born: January 27, 1942 (age 84) Oakland, California
- Party: Democratic Party (United States)
- Spouse: Sheryl Kerchal (m. 1968)
- Education: Northern State College (B.A.); University of Nebraska Omaha
- Occupation: Teacher

Steve Wiitala (born January 27, 1942) is a Democratic teacher and politician from Nebraska who served as a member of the Nebraska Legislature from the 31st district from 1981 to 1983 and as Douglas County Election Commissioner from 1984 to 1987.

== Early career ==
Wiitala was born in Oakland, California, and grew up in Frederick, South Dakota. He attended Northern State College, where he received his bachelor's degree in history and was elected student body president. Wiitala taught at Redfield High School in Redfield, South Dakota, from 1964 to 1965, and then moved to Omaha, Nebraska, where he taught history at Westside High School from 1965 to 1983.

== Nebraska Legislature ==
In 1980, State Senator Neil Simon declined to seek re-election to a second term, and Wiitala ran to succeed him in the 31st district, which was based in the western suburbs of Omaha. Wiitala ran in a crowded field of opponents, including secretary Louise Abrahamson, chiropractor Russ Sawyer, landscaper George Rose, former State Senator Donald Troudt, and retired businessman Neal Walker. Wiitala placed first in the primary, winning 40 percent of the vote, and advanced to the general election with Sawyer, who placed second with 22 percent of the vote. In the general election, Wiitala narrowly defeated Sawyer, winning 52–48 percent.

== Post-legislative career ==
Wiitala resigned from the legislature on September 1, 1983, citing his inability to support himself on a state legislative salary. Governor Bob Kerrey appointed him as the Douglas County Election Commissioner, effective January 1, 1984, and Wiitala taught political science at economics at Arbor Heights Junior High School until the appointment was effective. Upon the election of Republican Kay Orr in 1986, she replaced Wiitala in 1988.

Following Wiitala's departure as Election Commissioner, the state legislature hired him to conduct an eighteen-month study of the state's election laws and to recommend changes. Wiitala's suggested reforms resulted in the passage of legislation several years later to reform the election code.

Wiitala ran for the Democratic nomination for Lieutenant Governor in 1990. He faced Maxine Moul, the state's Democratic National committeewoman; Keth Edquist, a member of the Omaha Public Power District; anti-radioactive waste activist Gary Rogge; and perennial candidate Ken Michaelis. Wiitala narrowly lost the Democratic primary to Moul, who won 30 percent of the vote to Wiitala's 27 percent.

In 1994, Wiitala considered running for Nebraska Secretary of State following the retirement of Allen J. Beermann, but ultimately declined to do so. Later that year, he was hired by the Omaha Public Schools to serve as the government relations coordinator.
