= Vickie McDonald =

American politician

Vickie D. McDonald

Member of the Nebraska Legislature from the 41st district
- In office August 10, 2001 – January 7, 2009
- Appointed by: Mike Johanns
- Preceded by: Richard N. McDonald
- Succeeded by: Kate Sullivan

Personal details
- Born: May 26, 1947 (age 79) Phillips, Nebraska
- Party: Republican

Vickie D. McDonald (born May 26, 1947) is a retired Nebraska state senator from St. Paul, Nebraska, in the Nebraska Legislature.

== Personal life ==
McDonald was born on May 26, 1947, in Phillips, Nebraska, and graduated from Phillips High School. She was a 1990 Dale Carnegie graduate, 1996 Nebraska LEAD Program graduate, 1997 Life Underwriters Training Council graduate, 1999 Hall County Leadership Tomorrow graduate, and a 2002 Bowhay Institute for Legislative Leadership Development graduate. She worked in many financial services occupations and was a member of many Grand Island, Nebraska, organizations. After the death of her husband Richard N. McDonald, she married Larry Harnisch. They live in Lincoln, Nebraska.

== State legislature ==
McDonald was appointed to the legislature by Governor Mike Johanns on August 10, 2001, to replace her husband, deceased senator Richard N. McDonald. She was then elected in 2002 to represent the 41st Nebraska legislative district and reelected in 2004. She sat on the Education, Natural Resources, Reference, and Legislative Performance Audit committees as well as the Executive Board. She served as the vice chair of the Intergovernmental Cooperation committee.

== Drug policy ==
=== Salvia divinorum ===
McDonald supported a proposal for the addition of the psychoactive herb Salvia divinorum to Nebraska's Schedule I classification early in 2008. Salvia divinorum was legal in Nebraska, but McDonald claimed that "Nebraska needs to classify Salvia divinorum and its active ingredient, salvinorin A, as a controlled substance in order to protect our children from a drug being portrayed as harmless when it's not." She also said that "Videos of teens using this common plant to get high have become an internet sensation. [...] Anytime anything's on YouTube it's an issue. [...] Legislators, parents, grandparents, we need to be on top of these things. [...] We need to protect our children and this is one way we can do it."

Her bill proposed addition of Salvia divinorum to Schedule I of the Nebraska Uniform Controlled Substances Act, making the possession of Salvia a Class IV felony with a penalty of up to five years. Trafficking would fall under a Class III felony with up to a 20-year penalty. Opponents of extremely prohibitive Salvia restrictions argued that such reactions were largely due to an inherent prejudice and a particular cultural bias rather than any actual balance of evidence, pointing out inconsistencies in attitudes toward other more toxic and addictive drugs such as alcohol and nicotine.

McDonald's bill, LB840, was ultimately not passed by the Nebraska Legislature. However, shortly after she was term limited and left office, another bill restricting the use of Salvia divinorum, LB123 sponsored by Russ Karpisek, passed the Nebraska Legislature in 2009.

== See also ==
- Nebraska Legislature
- Legal status of Salvia divinorum in the United States
