= Garfield County, Nebraska =

County in Nebraska, United States

- County
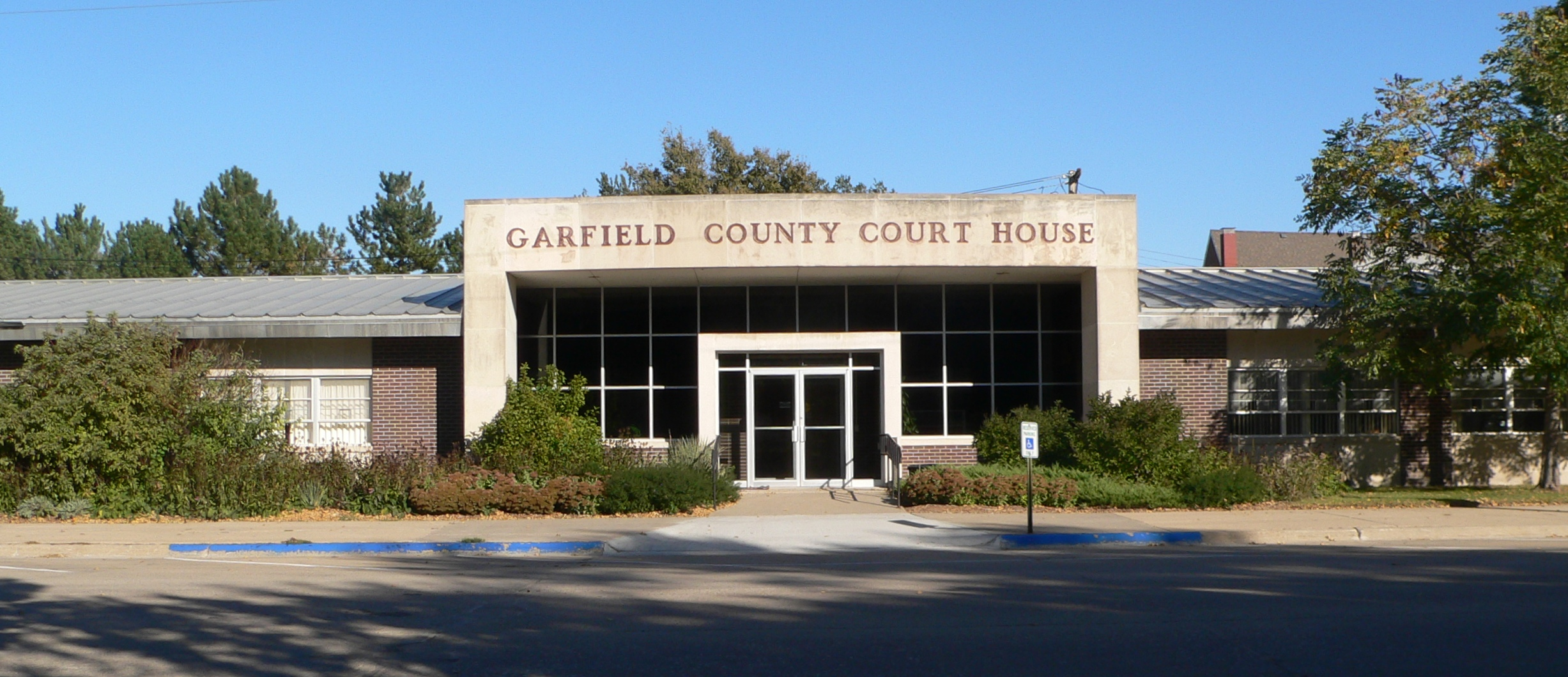
- Garfield County Courthouse in Burwell

- Location within the U.S. state of Nebraska
- Coordinates: 41°53′N 98°59′W
- Country: United States
- State: Nebraska
- Founded: 1884
- Named for: James A. Garfield
- Seat: Burwell
- Largest city: Burwell

Area
  - Total: 571 sq mi (1,480 km^{2})
  - Land: 570 sq mi (1,500 km^{2})
  - Water: 1.6 sq mi (4.1 km^{2}) 0.3%

Population (2020)
  - Total: 1,813
  - Estimate (2025): 1,710 ▼
  - Density: 3.2/sq mi (1.2/km^{2})
- Time zone: UTC−6 (Central)
  - Summer (DST): UTC−5 (CDT)
- Congressional district: 3rd
- Website: www.garfieldcounty.ne.gov

Garfield County is a county in the U.S. state of Nebraska. As of the 2020 United States census, the population was 1,813. Its county seat is Burwell. The county was organized in 1884; it was named for James A. Garfield, 20th President of the United States.

In the Nebraska license plate system, Garfield County is represented by the prefix 83 (it had the 83rd-largest number of vehicles registered in the county when the license plate system was established in 1922).

== Geography ==
The North Loup River runs through the southwest corner of Garfield County.

According to the US Census Bureau, the county has an area of 571 square miles (1,480 km^{2}), of which 570 square miles (1,500 km^{2}) is land and 1.6 square miles (4.1 km^{2}) (0.3%) is water.

=== Major highways ===
- Nebraska Highway 11
- Nebraska Highway 70
- Nebraska Highway 91
- Nebraska Highway 96

=== Adjacent counties ===
- Wheeler County – east
- Valley County – south
- Custer County – southwest
- Loup County – west
- Holt County – north

=== Protected areas ===
- Calamus Reservoir State Park (partial)
- Mirdan Canal State Wildlife Management Area

== Demographics ==
Historical population
Census	Pop.	Note	%±
1890	1,659		—
1900	2,127		28.2%
1910	3,417		60.6%
1920	3,496		2.3%
1930	3,207		−8.3%
1940	3,444		7.4%
1950	2,912		−15.4%
1960	2,699		−7.3%
1970	2,411		−10.7%
1980	2,363		−2.0%
1990	2,141		−9.4%
2000	1,902		−11.2%
2010	2,049		7.7%
2020	1,813		−11.5%
2025 (est.)	1,710	▼	−5.7%
US Decennial Census; 1790-1960 1900-1990; 1990-2000 2010 2020 2022

=== 2020 census ===
As of the 2020 census, the county had a population of 1,813. The median age was 46.9 years. 21.1% of residents were under the age of 18 and 28.8% of residents were 65 years of age or older. For every 100 females there were 93.3 males, and for every 100 females age 18 and over there were 93.9 males age 18 and over.

The racial makeup of the county was 97.0% White, 0.2% Black or African American, 0.2% American Indian and Alaska Native, 0.0% Asian, 0.0% Native Hawaiian and Pacific Islander, 0.1% from some other race, and 2.6% from two or more races. Hispanic or Latino residents of any race comprised 1.3% of the population.

0.0% of residents lived in urban areas, while 100.0% lived in rural areas.

There were 776 households in the county, of which 27.2% had children under the age of 18 living with them and 24.1% had a female householder with no spouse or partner present. About 31.6% of all households were made up of individuals and 16.0% had someone living alone who was 65 years of age or older.

There were 1,053 housing units, of which 26.3% were vacant. Among occupied housing units, 68.4% were owner-occupied and 31.6% were renter-occupied. The homeowner vacancy rate was 2.8% and the rental vacancy rate was 5.8%.

=== 2000 census ===
As of the 2000 United States census, there were 1,902 people, 813 households, and 529 families in the county. The population density was 3 people per square mile (1.2 people/km^{2}). There were 1,021 housing units at an average density of 2 units per square mile (0.77/km^{2}).

The racial makeup of the county was 98.79% White, 0.21% Native American, 0.05% Asian, 0.05% Pacific Islander, 0.37% from other races, and 0.53% from two or more races. 1.00% of the population were Hispanic or Latino of any race.

There were 813 households, out of which 26.10% had children under the age of 18 living with them, 59.70% were married couples living together, 3.60% had a female householder with no husband present, and 34.90% were non-families. 32.70% of all households were made up of individuals, and 20.00% had someone living alone who was 65 years of age or older. The average household size was 2.27 and the average family size was 2.88.

The county population contained 23.50% under the age of 18, 4.40% from 18 to 24, 20.50% from 25 to 44, 26.80% from 45 to 64, and 24.80% who were 65 years of age or older. The median age was 46 years. For every 100 females there were 91.90 males. For every 100 females age 18 and over, there were 85.40 males.

The median income for a household in the county was $27,407, and the median income for a family was $34,762. Males had a median income of $24,563 versus $16,146 for females. The per capita income for the county was $14,368. About 9.70% of families and 12.60% of the population were below the poverty line, including 11.50% of those under age 18 and 18.60% of those age 65 or over.

== Communities ==
=== City ===
- Burwell (county seat)

=== Unincorporated communities ===
- Darenn
- Deverre
- Erina
- Gables(Population of 16)

== Politics ==
Garfield County voters are reliably Republican. In only one national election since 1916 has the county selected the Democratic Party nominee.

United States presidential election results for Garfield County, Nebraska
Year	Republican		Democratic		Third party(ies)	
Year	No.	%	No.	%	No.	%
1900	251	50.50%	235	47.28%	11	2.21%
1904	406	67.44%	84	13.95%	112	18.60%
1908	368	48.17%	363	47.51%	33	4.32%
1912	192	23.67%	234	28.85%	385	47.47%
1916	302	37.42%	426	52.79%	79	9.79%
1920	611	64.32%	252	26.53%	87	9.16%
1924	757	59.14%	251	19.61%	272	21.25%
1928	1,180	83.04%	235	16.54%	6	0.42%
1932	622	43.90%	775	54.69%	20	1.41%
1936	744	50.41%	697	47.22%	35	2.37%
1940	1,053	66.39%	533	33.61%	0	0.00%
1944	896	68.71%	408	31.29%	0	0.00%
1948	702	56.43%	542	43.57%	0	0.00%
1952	1,042	80.46%	253	19.54%	0	0.00%
1956	936	78.13%	262	21.87%	0	0.00%
1960	1,047	77.44%	305	22.56%	0	0.00%
1964	761	61.17%	483	38.83%	0	0.00%
1968	797	76.41%	183	17.55%	63	6.04%
1972	903	81.21%	209	18.79%	0	0.00%
1976	726	64.76%	343	30.60%	52	4.64%
1980	811	73.19%	238	21.48%	59	5.32%
1984	899	81.43%	196	17.75%	9	0.82%
1988	803	75.97%	234	22.14%	20	1.89%
1992	595	54.74%	221	20.33%	271	24.93%
1996	625	63.26%	249	25.20%	114	11.54%
2000	718	74.56%	202	20.98%	43	4.47%
2004	806	79.25%	196	19.27%	15	1.47%
2008	800	77.67%	212	20.58%	18	1.75%
2012	769	81.81%	149	15.85%	22	2.34%
2016	821	83.78%	121	12.35%	38	3.88%
2020	933	86.71%	133	12.36%	10	0.93%
2024	893	87.81%	116	11.41%	8	0.79%

== See also ==
- National Register of Historic Places listings in Garfield County, Nebraska
