= Burwell, Nebraska =

- City
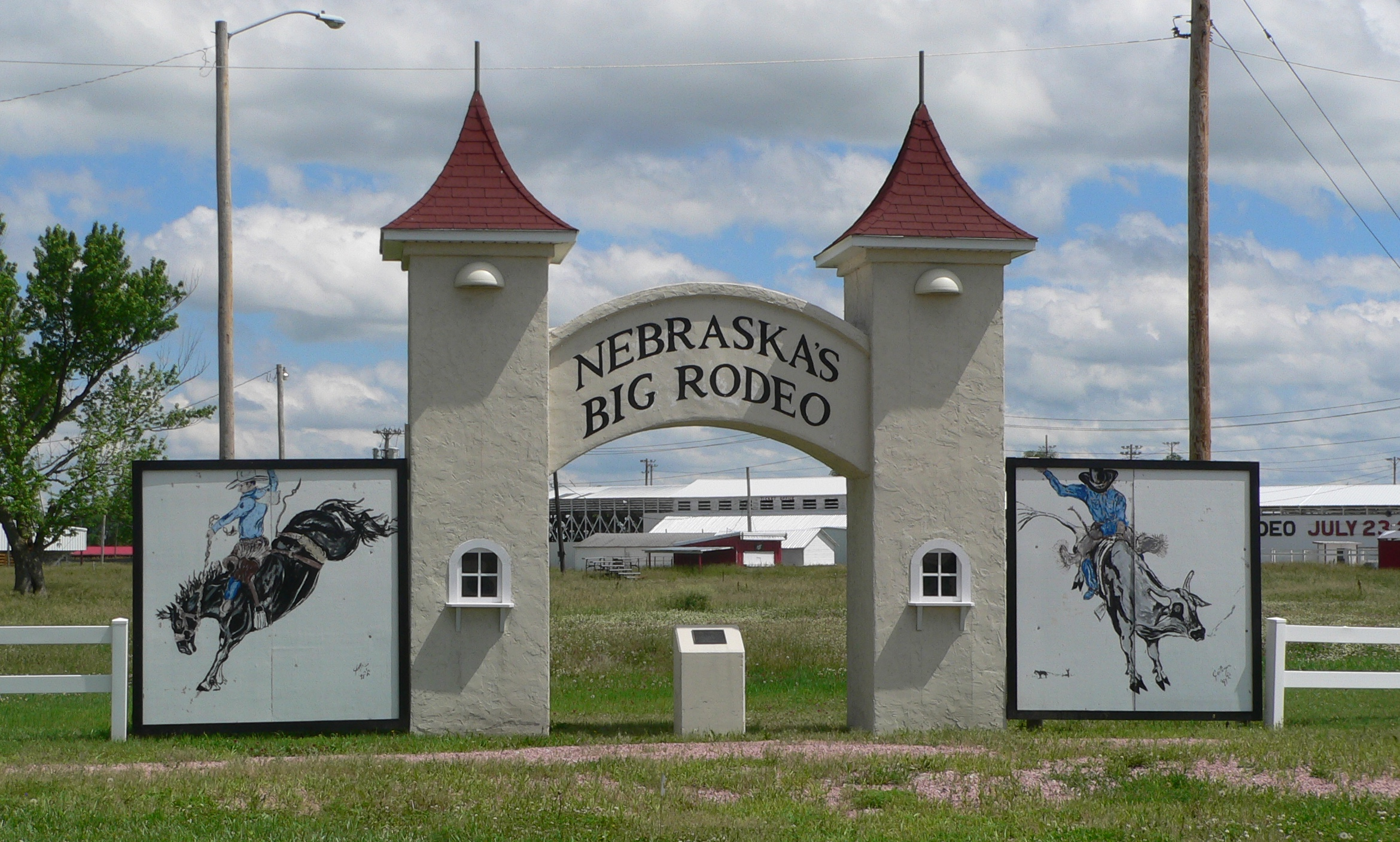
- Entrance of Garfield County Frontier Fairgrounds, site of Nebraska's Big Rodeo.

- Location of Burwell, Nebraska
- Coordinates: 41°46′48″N 99°08′03″W
- Country: United States
- State: Nebraska
- County: Garfield

Area
  - Total: 1.05 sq mi (2.72 km^{2})
  - Land: 1.05 sq mi (2.72 km^{2})
  - Water: 0 sq mi (0.00 km^{2})
- Elevation: 2,175 ft (663 m)

Population (2020)
  - Total: 1,087
  - Density: 1,036.1/sq mi (400.03/km^{2})
- Time zone: UTC-6 (Central (CST))
  - Summer (DST): UTC-5 (CDT)
- ZIP code: 68823
- Area code: 308
- FIPS code: 31-07345
- GNIS feature ID: 2393477
- Website: burwellonline.com

Burwell is a city in Garfield County, Nebraska, United States. As of the 2020 census, Burwell had a population of 1,087. It is the county seat of Garfield County.

== History ==
Burwell was platted in 1883. In 1887, the Chicago, Burlington and Quincy Railroad was extended to Burwell.

Burwell is host to "Nebraska's Big Rodeo", an annual event usually held the last weekend of July. This has been an important event for the town's economy and has been a staple for over 80 years. Burwell was one of the initial FFA chapters of the state of Nebraska. The chapter was chartered March 1929.

== Geography ==
According to the United States Census Bureau, the city has a total area of 1.04 square miles (2.69 km^{2}), all land.

=== Climate ===
Climate data for Burwell, Nebraska (1991–2020 normals, extremes 1948–present)
Month	Jan	Feb	Mar	Apr	May	Jun	Jul	Aug	Sep	Oct	Nov	Dec	Year
Record high °F (°C)	73 (23)	80 (27)	90 (32)	95 (35)	102 (39)	107 (42)	114 (46)	107 (42)	104 (40)	95 (35)	84 (29)	73 (23)	114 (46)
Mean maximum °F (°C)	58.9 (14.9)	63.4 (17.4)	76.2 (24.6)	84.2 (29.0)	89.1 (31.7)	94.4 (34.7)	98.9 (37.2)	96.8 (36.0)	92.6 (33.7)	84.3 (29.1)	72.2 (22.3)	59.6 (15.3)	99.9 (37.7)
Mean daily maximum °F (°C)	34.2 (1.2)	38.1 (3.4)	50.0 (10.0)	60.0 (15.6)	70.0 (21.1)	80.4 (26.9)	86.2 (30.1)	83.8 (28.8)	76.5 (24.7)	62.5 (16.9)	48.1 (8.9)	36.0 (2.2)	60.5 (15.8)
Daily mean °F (°C)	23.2 (−4.9)	26.8 (−2.9)	37.3 (2.9)	47.4 (8.6)	58.4 (14.7)	69.2 (20.7)	74.6 (23.7)	72.0 (22.2)	63.6 (17.6)	49.6 (9.8)	36.0 (2.2)	25.6 (−3.6)	48.6 (9.2)
Mean daily minimum °F (°C)	12.2 (−11.0)	15.5 (−9.2)	24.7 (−4.1)	34.8 (1.6)	46.9 (8.3)	58.0 (14.4)	63.0 (17.2)	60.3 (15.7)	50.6 (10.3)	36.6 (2.6)	23.9 (−4.5)	15.1 (−9.4)	36.8 (2.7)
Mean minimum °F (°C)	−10.5 (−23.6)	−6.3 (−21.3)	5.7 (−14.6)	18.8 (−7.3)	31.0 (−0.6)	44.2 (6.8)	50.5 (10.3)	48.0 (8.9)	33.9 (1.1)	19.0 (−7.2)	5.1 (−14.9)	−5.8 (−21.0)	−16.0 (−26.7)
Record low °F (°C)	−34 (−37)	−33 (−36)	−22 (−30)	1 (−17)	21 (−6)	30 (−1)	37 (3)	37 (3)	19 (−7)	1 (−17)	−16 (−27)	−30 (−34)	−34 (−37)
Average precipitation inches (mm)	0.51 (13)	0.68 (17)	1.38 (35)	3.05 (77)	4.04 (103)	3.74 (95)	3.31 (84)	3.29 (84)	2.14 (54)	2.13 (54)	0.87 (22)	0.71 (18)	25.85 (657)
Average snowfall inches (cm)	5.8 (15)	6.3 (16)	3.6 (9.1)	3.5 (8.9)	0.2 (0.51)	0.0 (0.0)	0.0 (0.0)	0.0 (0.0)	0.0 (0.0)	1.5 (3.8)	2.3 (5.8)	6.0 (15)	29.2 (74)
Average precipitation days (≥ 0.01 in)	3.5	4.5	5.6	8.8	10.3	10.2	8.3	7.7	6.2	6.0	3.5	3.7	78.3
Average snowy days (≥ 0.1 in)	3.1	3.4	2.3	1.3	0.0	0.0	0.0	0.0	0.0	0.7	1.5	2.9	15.2
Source: NOAA

== Demographics ==
Historical population
Census	Pop.	Note	%±
1890	378		—
1900	460		21.7%
1910	915		98.9%
1920	1,214		32.7%
1930	1,156		−4.8%
1940	1,412		22.1%
1950	1,413		0.1%
1960	1,425		0.8%
1970	1,341		−5.9%
1980	1,383		3.1%
1990	1,278		−7.6%
2000	1,130		−11.6%
2010	1,210		7.1%
2020	1,087		−10.2%
U.S. Decennial Census

=== 2010 census ===
As of the census of 2010, there were 1,210 people, 574 households, and 312 families living in the city. The population density was 1,163.5 inhabitants per square mile (449.2/km^{2}). There were 667 housing units at an average density of 641.3 per square mile (247.6/km^{2}). The racial makeup of the city was 99.4% White, 0.2% African American, 0.1% from other races, and 0.2% from two or more races. Hispanic or Latino of any race were 0.9% of the population.

There were 574 households, of which 21.3% had children under the age of 18 living with them, 48.1% were married couples living together, 4.9% had a female householder with no husband present, 1.4% had a male householder with no wife present, and 45.6% were non-families. 43.2% of all households were made up of individuals, and 26.2% had someone living alone who was 65 years of age or older. The average household size was 2.06 and the average family size was 2.87.

The median age in the city was 49.8 years. 21.3% of residents were under the age of 18; 5.3% were between the ages of 18 and 24; 16.8% were from 25 to 44; 27.3% were from 45 to 64; and 29.3% were 65 years of age or older. The gender makeup of the city was 46.8% male and 53.2% female.

=== 2000 census ===
As of the census of 2000, there were 1,130 people, 507 households, and 277 families living in the city. The population density was 1,091.0 inhabitants per square mile (421.2/km^{2}). There were 622 housing units at an average density of 600.5 per square mile (231.9/km^{2}). The racial makeup of the city was 98.32% White, 0.27% Native American, 0.53% from other races, and 0.88% from two or more races. Hispanic or Latino of any race were 1.24% of the population.

There were 507 households, out of which 24.1% had children under the age of 18 living with them, 48.5% were married couples living together, 4.7% had a female householder with no husband present, and 45.2% were non-families. 42.8% of all households were made up of individuals, and 27.6% had someone living alone who was 65 years of age or older. The average household size was 2.12 and the average family size was 2.97.

The median age in the city was 47 years. 23.0% of the population was under the age of 18, 4.2% were aged from 18 to 24, 20.1% from 25 to 44, 23.7% from 45 to 64, and 28.9% were 65 years of age or older. For every 100 females, there were 82.8 males. For every 100 females age 18 and over, there were 75.1 males.

As of 2000 the median income for a household in the city was $22,569, and the median income for a family was $33,558. Males had a median income of $24,875 versus $17,222 for females. The per capita income for the city was $13,949. About 10.3% of families and 14.3% of the population were below the poverty line, including 13.5% of those under age 18 and 23.7% of those age 65 or over.

== Notable people ==
- Kate Sullivan, Nebraska legislator

== See also ==
- List of municipalities in Nebraska
