= Interstate 80 in Nebraska =

Highway in Nebraska

Interstate 80
- I-80 highlighted in red

Route information
- Maintained by NDOT
- Length: 455.32 mi (732.77 km)
- Existed: 1957–present
- NHS: Entire route

Major junctions
- West end: I-80 at the Wyoming state line in Pine Bluffs, WY
- I-76 near Big Springs; US 26 / N-61 in Ogallala; US 83 in North Platte; US 34 / US 281 in Grand Island; US 81 near York; US 77 in Lincoln; I-180 / US 34 in Lincoln; US 6 near Waverly; I-680 in Omaha; I-480 / US 75 in Omaha
- East end: I-80 at the Iowa state line in Omaha

Location
- Country: United States
- State: Nebraska
- Counties: Kimball, Cheyenne, Deuel, Keith, Lincoln, Dawson, Buffalo, Hall, Hamilton, York, Seward, Lancaster, Cass, Sarpy, Douglas

Highway system
- Interstate Highway System; Main; Auxiliary; Suffixed; Business; Future; Nebraska State Highway System; Interstate; US; State; Link; Spur; State Spurs; Recreation
← N-79	→ US 81

Interstate 80 (I-80) in the US state of Nebraska runs east from the Wyoming state border across the state to Omaha. Construction of the stretch of I-80 spanning the state was completed on October 19, 1974. Nebraska was the first state in the nation to complete its mainline Interstate Highway System.

I-80 has over 80 exits in Nebraska; according to The New York Times there are several notable tourist attractions along Nebraska's section of I-80. It is the only Interstate Highway to travel from one end of Nebraska to another, as the state has no major north–south Interstate route. Except for a three-mile-long (4.8 km) portion of I-76 near the Colorado state line, I-80 is the only primary (two-digit) Interstate Highway in Nebraska.

== History ==
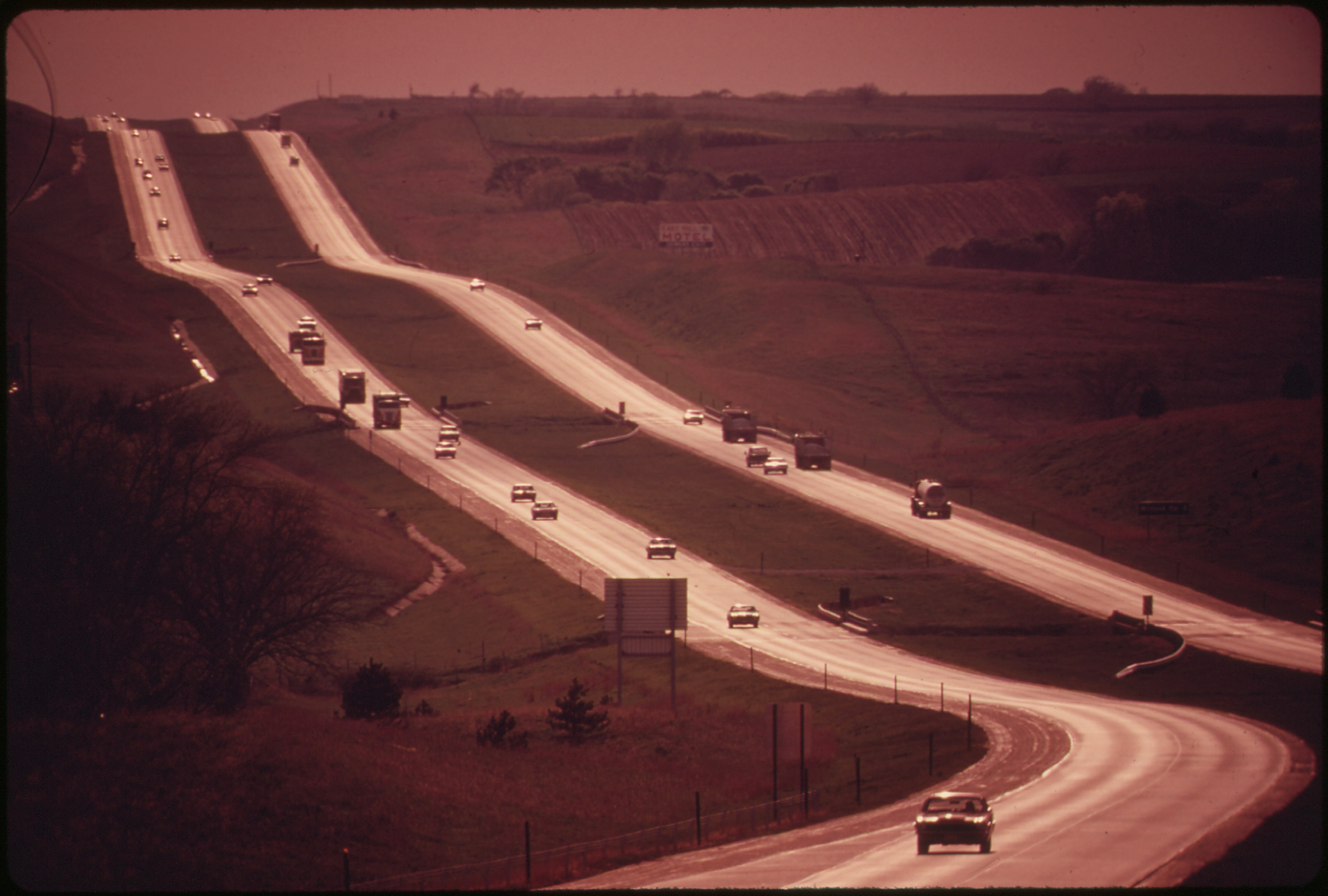
I-80 in May 1973

Built along the pathway of the Great Platte River Road, I-80 in Nebraska follows the same route as many historic trails, including the Oregon, California, and Mormon trails. Starting in 1957 after federal funding was allotted, Nebraskans began planning their Interstate construction. Led by the Nebraska State Highway Commission, there were hearings across the state to decide where the route was going to be. Aside from the federally mandated "control points" in Omaha, Lincoln, and Grand Island, the route could vary across the state. Dozens of meetings were held in Grand Island, Kearney, and North Platte, among other locations. The commission addressed issues of whether the highway would be north or south of the Platte River or whether it would follow US Highway 30 (US-30). The South Platte Chamber of Commerce and various cities were very active in these sessions, and debate over where the Interstate would be constructed continued into the 1960s.

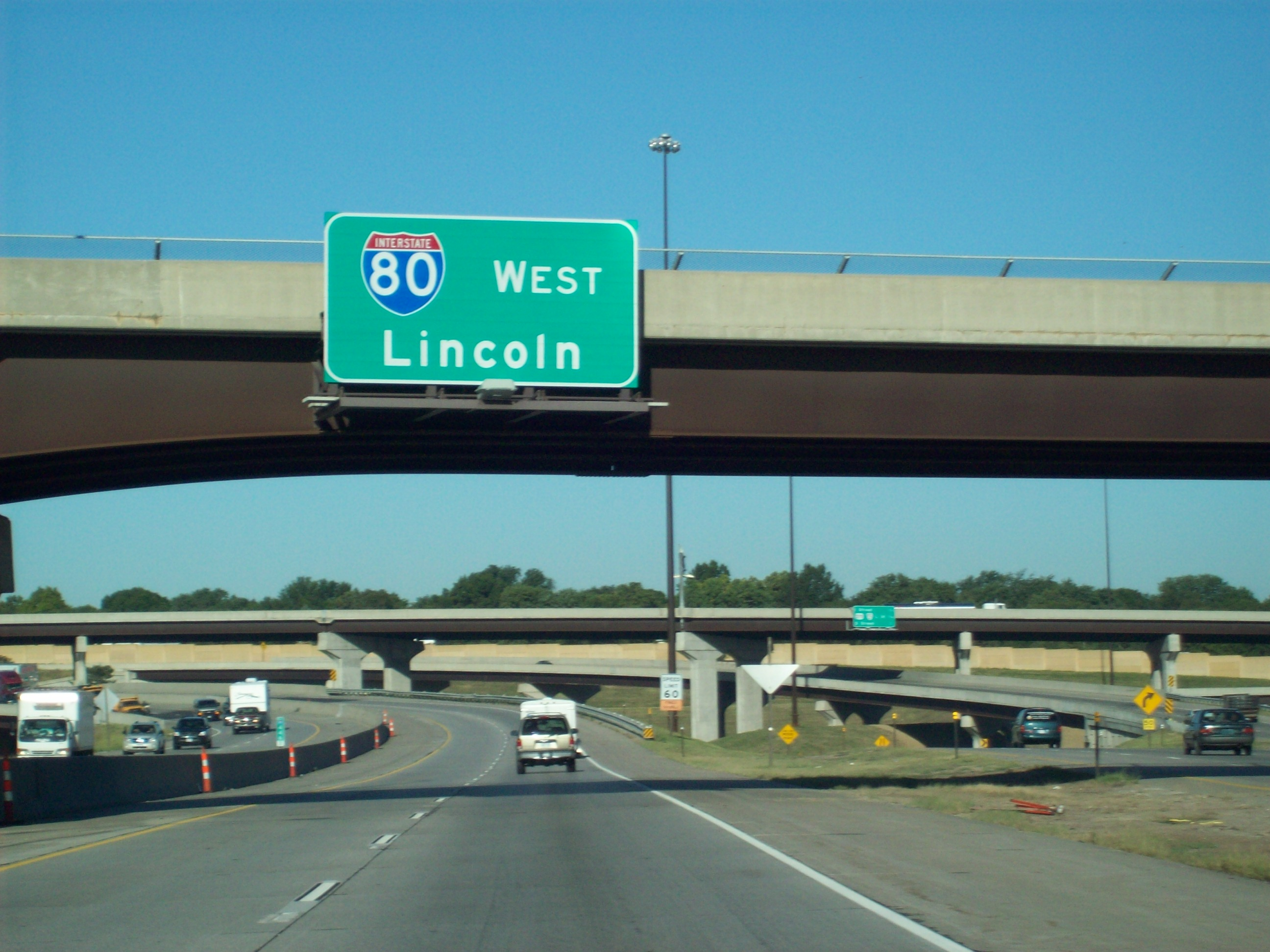
I-80 in Omaha looking west at its interchange with I-680

After the first contract for building the Interstate was awarded in 1957, a 6.5-mile (10.5 km) section near Gretna was the first section to be completed that year. The first long segment to be opened was a 52-mile (84 km) section between Dodge Street in Omaha and the West Lincoln interchange in Lincoln on August 11, 1961. During a "Golden Link" ceremony, the last section of I-80 in Nebraska was completed when a brass connector was inserted in the roadway near Sidney on October 20, 1974. This was designed to emulate the golden spike ceremonially used to complete the first transcontinental railroad in 1869.

The total length of the Nebraska section is 455.32 miles (732.77 km) long and was completed at a cost of $435 million (equivalent to $2.21 billion in 2025).

=== Legacy ===
The beginning of the I-80 construction in Nebraska in 1957 led the Nebraska Legislature to split the Department of Roads and Irrigation to create three separate agencies in the state, including the Department of Motor Vehicles, Department of Water Resources, and the Department of Roads, which was the first Nebraska agency solely responsible for highway planning, construction, and maintenance in Nebraska history.

Interstate construction led the state to focus on other highways in Nebraska, as well. Surfaced shoulders, new safety sections beyond shoulders, and other developments across the state were attributed to the influence of the Interstate. The 1965 state legislature also authorized a study of the needs of every public road in Nebraska, including state highways, county roads, and city streets.

=== Speed limits ===
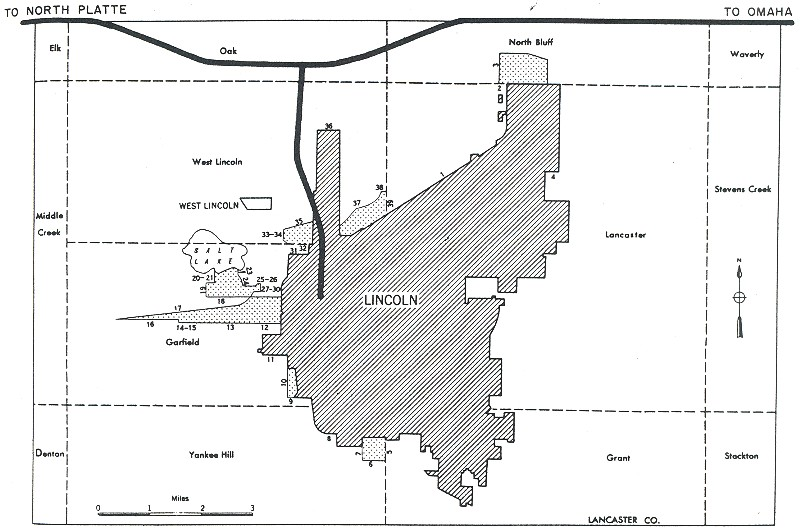
1955 map showing the future routes of Interstates in Lincoln, including I-80 and its child route, I-180

The following are speed limits that have existed on I-80 in Nebraska since it was opened in 1957.

Rural speed limits on I-80
Year	Speed limit (mph)	Speed limit (km/h)	Truck speed limit (mph)	Truck limit (km/h)
1960	70	110		
1964	75	121	65	105
1974 (Note: National speed limit, effective March 3, 1974)	55	89		
1987	65	105		
1995	75	121		

== Route description ==
=== Designated sections ===
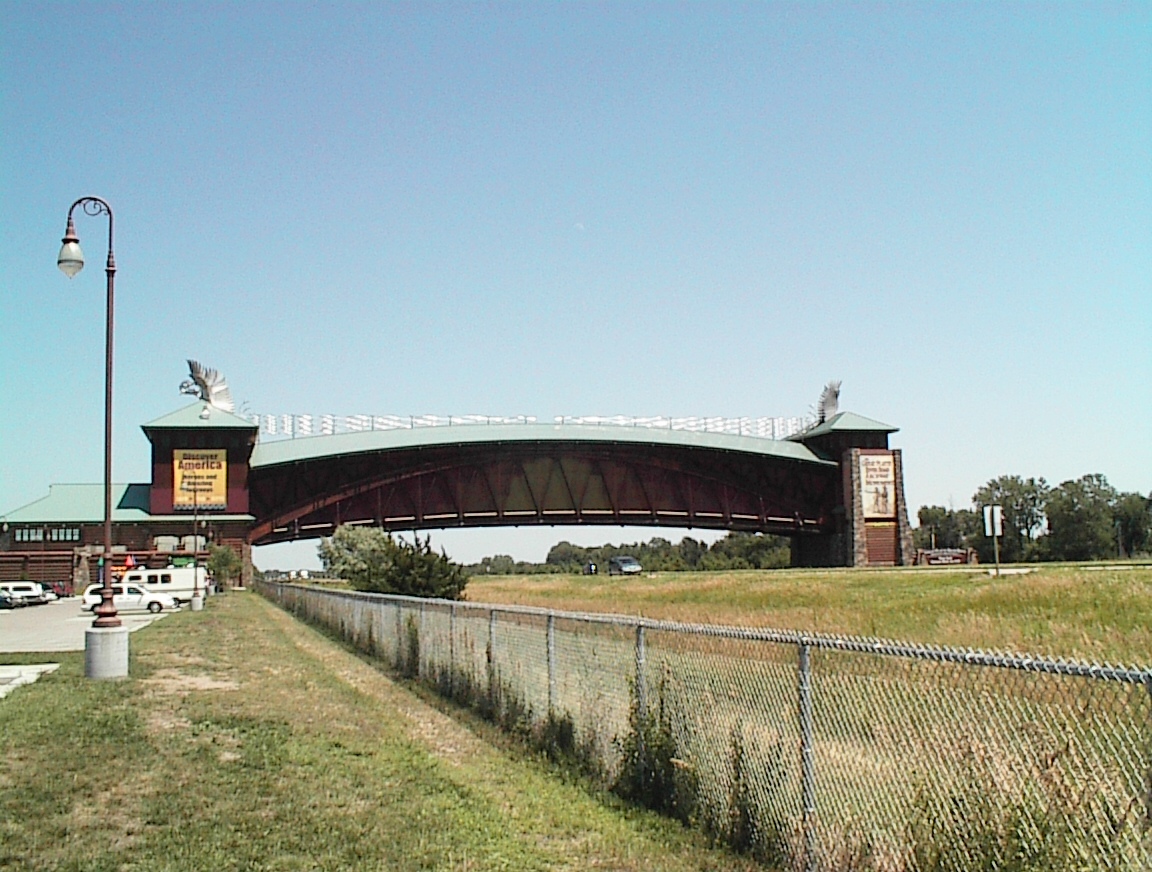
The Great Platte River Road Archway Monument in Kearney, which spans I-80

The entirety of the Interstate Highway System was named the "Dwight D. Eisenhower System of Interstate and Defense Highways" in 1990, and the first signage in Nebraska was posted in 1993. Several sections of I-80 in Nebraska have special designations. The I-80 intersection with US-34 has been designated a "Purple Heart Memorial Highway", and South 108th Street bridge over I-80 in Omaha has been designated the "Purple Heart Bridge", both in honor of all recipients of the Purple Heart. A section of I-80 in Nebraska is also designated as a Blue Star Memorial Highway.

=== Details ===
In Nebraska, I-80 has 82 interchanges, 442 bridges on or over the roadway, 25 rest areas spaced 35–50 miles (56–80 km) apart for convenience, and one scenic overlook. The I-80 right-of-ways in Nebraska feature 28 types of grasses and forbs, 31 types of shrubs, 12 varieties of coniferous trees, and 39 types of deciduous trees are planted on the median of I-80 in Nebraska. There are also 570 informational and directional signs along the way.

Milemarkers with the Interstate shield are posted every 0.5 miles (0.80 km) from mile 103 to mile 312 and every 0.2 miles (0.32 km) from mile 312 easterly. Most of the route is straight plains, and a stretch between Lincoln and Grand Island is almost entirely straight with very few curves whatsoever. From Exit 395 eastward (excluding the exchange with I-680 in Omaha), I-80 carries at least three lanes of traffic.

== Exit list ==
County	Location	mi	km	Exit	Destinations	Notes
Kimball	Bushnell Precinct	0.00	0.00		I-80 west – Cheyenne	Continuation into Wyoming
Kimball	Bushnell Precinct	0.48	0.77	1	L-53B north (State Line Road) to US 30 – Pine Bluffs	Former I-80 BL west
Kimball	Bushnell Precinct	8.46	13.62	8	L-53C – Bushnell	
Kimball	Antelope Precinct	20.71	33.33	20	N-71 south – Kimball	Western end of N-71 overlap
Kimball	Antelope Precinct	22.69	36.52	22	N-71 north – Gering, Scottsbluff	Eastern end of N-71 overlap
Kimball	Dix	29.76	47.89	29	L-53A – Dix	
Cheyenne	Potter	38.96	62.70	38	L-17B – Potter	
Cheyenne	Potter Precinct	48.82	78.57	48	L-17C	
Cheyenne	Potter Precinct	51.31	82.58	Sidney Rest Area (eastbound); location of the Golden Link		
Cheyenne	Sidney	55.37	89.11	55	N-19 (West Entrance) – Sidney	Former I-80 BL east
Cheyenne	Sidney	59.92	96.43	59	L-17J to US 385 – Sidney, Bridgeport	Former I-80 BL west
Cheyenne	Sunol	69.63	112.06	69	L-17E – Sunol	
Cheyenne	Lodgepole	76.61	123.29	76	L-17F – Lodgepole	
Deuel	Chappell	85.22	137.15	85	L-25A to US 385 – Chappell	
Deuel	Swan Precinct	95.02	152.92	95	N-27 – Julesburg, Oshkosh	
Deuel	Big Springs Precinct	101.19	162.85	101	US 138 – Big Springs, Julesburg	
Deuel	Big Springs Precinct	102.59	165.10	102	I-76 west – Denver	Former I-80S west; I-76 exit 3
Deuel	Big Springs	107.36	172.78	107	L-25B – Big Springs	
Keith	Brule	117.25	188.70	117	L-51A – Brule	
Keith	Ogallala	126.69	203.89	126	US 26 / N-61 – Ogallala, Grant	Eastern terminus of US 26
Keith	Roscoe	133.97	215.60	133	L-51B – Roscoe	
Keith	Paxton	145.65	234.40	145	L-51C – Paxton	
Lincoln	Sutherland	158.01	254.29	158	N-25 – Sutherland, Wallace	
Lincoln	Hershey	164.51	264.75	164	L-56C – Hershey	
Lincoln	North Platte	177.16	285.11	177	US 83 – North Platte, McCook	
Lincoln	North Platte	179.19	288.38	179	L-56G to US 30 – North Platte	
Lincoln	Maxwell	190.42	306.45	190	S-56A – Maxwell	
Lincoln	Brady	198.97	320.21	199	L-56D – Brady	
Dawson	Gothenburg	211.77	340.81	211	N-47 – Gothenburg	
Dawson	Cozad	222.46	358.01	222	N-21 – Cozad	
Dawson	Lexington Precinct	231.10	371.92	231	L-24A – Darr	
Dawson	Lexington	237.19	381.72	237	US 283 – Arapahoe, Lexington, Elwood	
Dawson	Overton	248.53	399.97	248	L-24B – Overton	
Buffalo	Elm Creek	257.01	413.62	257	US 183 – Holdrege, Elm Creek	
Buffalo	Odessa	263.66	424.32	263	L-10B – Odessa	
Buffalo	Kearney	272.60	438.71	272	N-44 – Kearney	
Buffalo	Kearney	275.59	443.52	275	N-10 north (East Entrance) – Kearney, Archway Monument	Western end of N-10 overlap
Buffalo	Precinct 29	279.89	450.44	279	N-10 south – Minden	Eastern end of N-10 overlap
Buffalo	Gibbon	285.63	459.68	285	L-10C – Gibbon	
Buffalo	Shelton	291.36	468.90	291	L-10D – Shelton, Kenesaw	
Hall	Wood River	300.10	482.96	300	N-11 north / S-40D south – Wood River	
Hall	Alda Township	305.66	491.91	305	L-40C – Alda	
Hall	Grand Island	312.07	502.23	312	US 34 / US 281 (Tom Osborne Expressway) – Hastings, Grand Island	
Hall	Grand Island	314.11	505.51	314	Locust Street – Grand Island	
Hamilton	Precinct 5–Precinct 2 line	318.14	512.00	318	N-2 – Phillips, Grand Island	
Hamilton	Giltner	324.14	521.65	324	S-41B – Giltner	
Hamilton	Aurora	332.15	534.54	332	N-14 – Aurora	
Hamilton	Hampton	338.12	544.15	338	L-41D – Hampton	
York	Henderson	342.11	550.57	342	S-93A – Henderson	
York	Baker Precinct	348.09	560.20	348	L-93E – Bradshaw	
York	York	353.09	568.24	353	US 81 – Geneva, York	
York	Beaver Precinct	360.11	579.54	360	L-93B – Waco	
Seward	Precinct L	366.13	589.23	366	L-80F – Utica	
Seward	Beaver Crossing	369.12	594.04	369	L-80E – Beaver Crossing	
Seward	Goehner	373.09	600.43	373	L-80G – Goehner	
Seward	Precinct J	379.08	610.07	379	N-15 – Seward, Fairbury	
Seward	Milford	382.08	614.90	382	L-80H – Milford	
Seward	Pleasant Dale	388.11	624.60	388	N-103 – Pleasant Dale, Crete	
Lancaster	Lincoln	395.59	636.64	395	L-55K (NW 48th Street) to US 6 – Lincoln	
Lancaster	Lincoln	396.36	637.88	396	US 6 (O Street) – Lincoln	Closed; was eastbound exit and westbound left entrance only
Lancaster	Lincoln	397.27	639.34	397	US 77 south – Lincoln, Beatrice, Nebraska City	Western end of US 77 overlap
Lancaster	Lincoln	399.01	642.14	399	NW 12th Street / Cornhusker Highway / Adams Street – Lincoln Airport	
Lancaster	Lincoln	401.04	645.41	401	I-180 south / US 34 / 9th Street – Downtown	Eastbound exits signed as 401A (south/east) and 401B (west)
Lancaster	Lincoln	403.48	649.34	403	27th Street	
Lancaster	North Bluff Precinct	405.75	652.99	405	US 77 north / L-55X south (56th Street) – Lincoln, Fremont, Wahoo	Eastern end of US 77 overlap; L-55X is former US 77 south
Lancaster	Waverly	409.74	659.41	409	US 6 – East Lincoln, Waverly	
Cass	Ashland	420.91	677.39	420	N-63 – Ashland, Greenwood	
Cass	Ashland	426.06	685.68	426	N-66 – South Bend, Louisville, Ashland	Mahoney State Park
Platte River		427.26	687.61	Bridge		
Sarpy	Melia-Forest City Precinct	430.6	693.0	430	South Sarpy Expressway	Proposed interchange
Sarpy	Gretna	432.94	696.75	432	N-31 to US 6 – Gretna, Schramm Park, Ashland	
Sarpy	Gretna	435.5	700.9	435	192nd Street / Capehart Road	Proposed interchange
Sarpy	Richland VIII Precinct	439.19	706.81	439	N-370 – Bellevue, Papillion, Gretna	Werner Park (stadium), Offutt Air Force Base
Sarpy	Chalco	440.63	709.13	440	N-50 (144th Street) – Springfield, West Omaha	
Sarpy	La Vista	442.89	712.76	442	Giles Road / Harrison Street	
Douglas	Omaha	444.56	715.45	445	Q Street	Westbound exit only; access from C/D lanes originating at West Center Rd. exit
Douglas	Omaha	445.05	716.24	445	US 275 / N-92 (L Street)	Cloverleaf interchange accessible to and from C/D lanes
Douglas	Omaha	445.34	716.71	445	I Street	Westbound exit and eastbound entrance accessible to and from C/D lanes
Douglas	Omaha	445.97	717.72	446	I-680 north	
Douglas	Omaha	446.63	718.78	445	West Center Road	No eastbound exit; I-680 exit 1; C/D lanes provide access to I-L-Q St. exits
Douglas	Omaha	448.29	721.45	448	84th Street	
Douglas	Omaha	449.30	723.08	449	72nd Street	
Douglas	Omaha	450.31	724.70	450	60th Street	
Douglas	Omaha	451.83	727.15	451	42nd Street	
Douglas	Omaha	452.85	728.79	452	I-480 / US 75 north (Gerald R. Ford Expressway) – Downtown, Eppley Airfield US 75 south (Kennedy Freeway) – Bellevue	Exits to southbound US 75 also include direct exit ramp onto F Street
Douglas	Omaha	453.04	729.10	453	24th Street	Eastbound exit and westbound entrance
Douglas	Omaha	454.14	730.87	454	13th Street – Gardens, Zoo	Former US 73 / US 75
Missouri River		455.31	732.75	Interstate 80 Bridge; Nebraska–Iowa state line		
Missouri River		455.31	732.75		I-80 east – Council Bluffs, Des Moines	Continuation into Iowa
1.000 mi = 1.609 km; 1.000 km = 0.621 mi: Closed/former; Concurrency terminus; Incomplete access; Unopened

== Auxiliary routes ==
I-80 has three auxiliary routes in Nebraska. One is a loop around the city of Omaha, one is a loop through the city of Omaha, and the other is a spur into Lincoln.

- I-180 is a spur into downtown Lincoln, cosigned with US-34 for its entire length.
- I-480 is a loop route in Omaha extending from I-29 in Council Bluffs, Iowa, west toward I-80. It serves as the inner of two loops in Omaha. It is cosigned with US-75 for approximately 2.5 miles (4.0 km) and with US-6 for less than one mile (1.6 km) as it crosses the Missouri River into Iowa.
- I-680 is a loop around the northwest of Omaha. It serves as the outer of the two Omaha loops. The section from I-80 in Omaha to I-29 in Crescent, Iowa, was originally designated as I-280, but, because it extended into Iowa and because it conflicted with I-280 in the Quad Cities area of Iowa, the route was renumbered I-680.

== See also ==
- History of Nebraska
- Transportation in Omaha, Nebraska

== Notes ==
Interstate 80
Previous state: Wyoming	Nebraska	Next state: Iowa
