= Nebraska Highway 1 =

State highway in Nebraska, U.S.

State Highway 1
- N-1 highlighted in red

Route information
- Maintained by NDOT
- Length: 26.88 mi (43.26 km)
- Existed: 1926–present

Major junctions
- West end: US 34 south of Elmwood
- S-13A south of Murdock; N-50 southwest of Manley
- East end: US 34 / US 75 east of Murray

Location
- Country: United States
- State: Nebraska
- Counties: Cass

Highway system
- Nebraska State Highway System; Interstate; US; State; Link; Spur; State Spurs; Recreation
← I-680	→ N-2

Nebraska Highway 1 (N-1) is a 26.88-mile (43.26 km) state highway in Cass County, Nebraska, United States. Its western terminus is at U.S. Route 34 (US 34) south of Elmwood, and its eastern terminus is at US 34/U.S. Route 75 in Nebraska (US 75) east of Murray.

== Route description ==
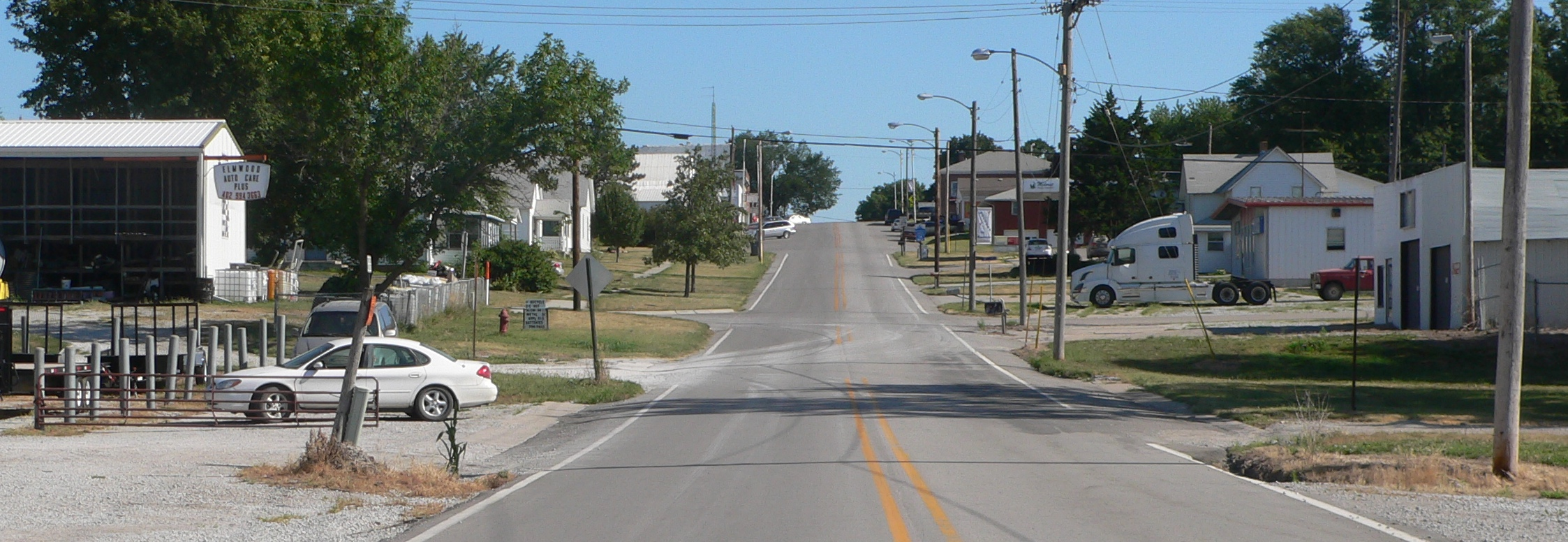
Looking north along N-1 (4th Street) from the southern edge of Elmwood, July 2012

N-1 begins at an intersection with US 34 about 2 miles (3.2 km) south of Elmwood. (US 34 heads west to Eagle and Lincoln and heads east to Union and the eastern terminus of N-1. The road continues south as South 29th Street toward Unadilla.) From its western terminus, N-1 heads north as a two-lane road through hilly farmland until it crosses Stove Creek and reaches Elmwood. Just inside the limits of the village N-1 crosses the MoPac Trail East. Within the village the route is known as 4th Street, and it passes by the business district of the village and a community park as it traverses from south to north. N-1 then leaves the limits of Elmwood and crosses Weeping Water Creek. Continuing north of Elmwood, the highway crosses Fletcher Avenue (a main east–west road in Cass County) and then crosses Beaver Creek before curving to the east. Just east of this bend, the route intersects with the south end of Nebraska Spur 13A (S-13A), a short spur route that connects N-1 with the small nearby village of Murdock. The road changes its direction from north–south to east–west at this junction.

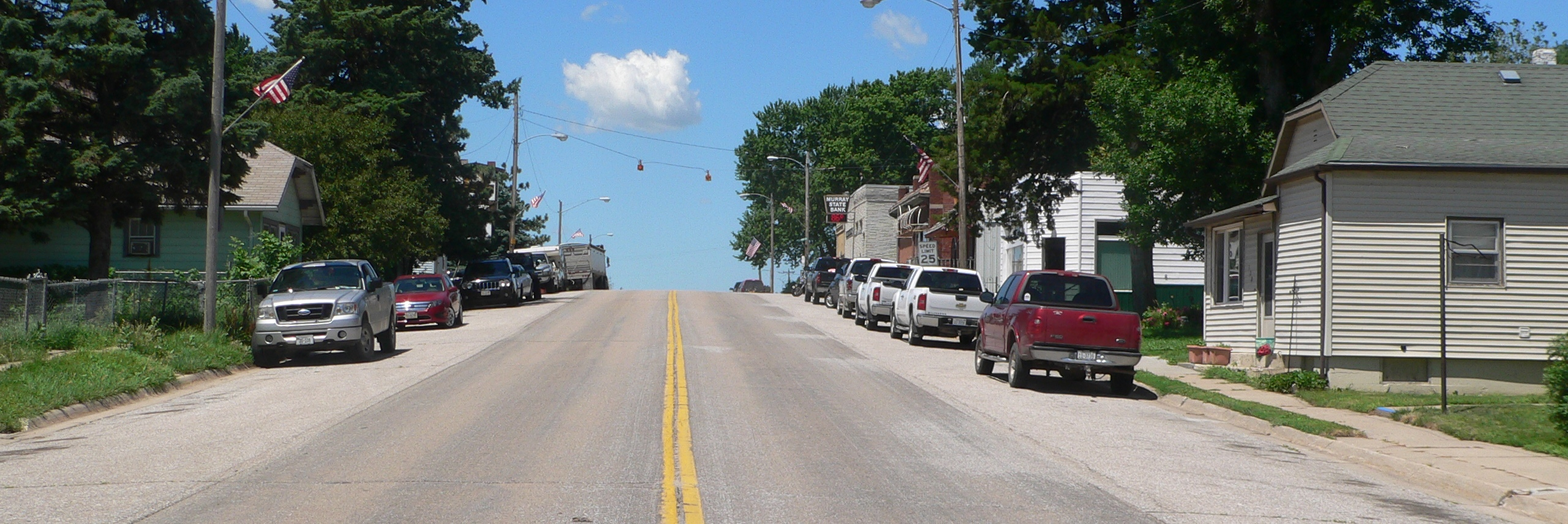
Looking west along N-1 (East Main Street) in Murray, June 2013

The route continues about 5.5 miles (8.9 km) east through more hilly farmland to an intersection with Nebraska Highway 50. East of this intersection, the route passes over South Cedar Creek and connects with the southern end of Manley Lane, the main access road to the nearby village of Manley. Immediately east of Manley Lane, N-1 crosses a single set of Union Pacific Railroad (UP) tracks. About one mile (1.6 km) east of the Manley area, N-1 serves the Cass County Fairgrounds, then continues east toward Murray. The route passes by Conestoga High School before entering the village limits. N-1 is known as Main Street in Murray, and it passes through the village from west to east. It heads through the business district, then traverses a viaduct over another line of the UP before exiting the village. Just east of Murray, N-1 reaches its western terminus at an intersection with US 34/US 75. (From the intersection US 34/US 75 heads north to Plattsmouth, Nebraska Highway 66, and the Platte River and heads south to Nebraska City. The road continues east as Murray Road to Beaver Lake and 27th Avenue.)

The route is maintained by the Nebraska Department of Roads (NDOR). In 2012, NDOR calculated traffic volume on its highways in terms of average annual daily traffic (AADT). N-1 had as many as 2385 vehicles, including 115 heavy commercial vehicles, between Murray and its eastern terminus, and as few as 695 vehicles, including 75 heavy commercial vehicles, between its intersections with S-13A and N-50.

== History ==
N-1 was originally designated in 1925 between Harrison and South Sioux City in the northern part of the state, replacing Nebraska Highway 79, Nebraska Highway 78, Nebraska Highway 77, Nebraska Highway 65, and Nebraska Highway 49. In 1926, this highway became U.S. Route 20, and the N-1 designation was transferred to its current route. This route was originally signed as Nebraska Highway 24 in 1922 and changed to Nebraska Highway 5A in 1925, and Nebraska Highway 30 in 1926 before becoming Nebraska Highway 1.

== Major intersections ==
The entire route is in Cass County.

Location	mi	km	Destinations	Notes
	0.00	0.00	South 298th Street south – Unadilla	Continuation south from western terminus
	0.00	0.00	US 34 east (East O Street) – Union, Plattsmouth US 34 west (East O Street/Bess Streeter Aldrich Memorial Highway) – Eagle, Lincoln	Western terminus
	7.38	11.88	S-13A north (394th Street) – Murdock	T intersection; southern end of S-13A; Signage changes the highway's direction from south-north to east-west at this intersection
	12.91	20.78	N-50 north – Louisville, Omaha N-50 south – Syracuse	
	26.88	43.26	US 34 north / US 75 north – Plattsmouth, Omaha US 34 south / US 75 south – Union, Nebraska City	Eastern terminus
	26.88	43.26	Murray Road east	Continuation east from eastern terminus
1.000 mi = 1.609 km; 1.000 km = 0.621 mi

== See also ==
- List of state highways in Nebraska
