= Nebraska Highway 69 =

State highway in Nebraska, U.S.

State Highway 69
- N-69 highlighted in red

Route information
- Maintained by NDOT
- Length: 20.87 mi (33.59 km)
- Existed: January 1, 1975–present

Major junctions
- South end: US 34 east of Waco
- North end: US 81 / N-92 in Shelby

Location
- Country: United States
- State: Nebraska
- Counties: York, Polk

Highway system
- Nebraska State Highway System; Interstate; US; State; Link; Spur; State Spurs; Recreation
← N-68	→ N-70

Nebraska Highway 69 is a highway in southeastern Nebraska. Its southern terminus is at an intersection with U.S. Highway 34 east of Waco. Its northern terminus is at an intersection with U.S. Highway 81 and Nebraska Highway 92 in Shelby.

== Route description ==
Nebraska Highway 69 begins at US 34 east of Waco and heads in a northbound direction through farmland. It passes through Gresham before continuing northward. It makes a slight turn to the west just north of Gresham before turning northward again. The highway continues into Shelby where it terminates at an intersection with US 81 and NE 92.

== Major intersections ==
County	Location	mi	km	Destinations	Notes
York	Waco	0.00	0.00	US 34 (Road 15)	Southern terminus
Polk	Shelby	20.87	33.59	US 81 / N-92 (Park Street)	Northern terminus
1.000 mi = 1.609 km; 1.000 km = 0.621 mi
