= U.S. Route 34 in Nebraska =

Section of U.S. Highway in Nebraska, United States

U.S. Highway 34
- US 34 highlighted in red

Route information
- Maintained by NDOT
- Length: 387.83 mi (624.15 km)
- Existed: 1934–present

Major junctions
- West end: US 34 at the Colorado state line near Laird, CO
- US 6 between Culbertson and Hastings; US 83 in McCook; US 283 in Arapahoe; US 136 near Edison; US 183 in Holdrege; US 281 between Hastings and Grand Island; I-80 near Grand Island; US 81 in York; I-80 / I-180 / US 77 in Lincoln; US 75 from Union to south of Offutt AFB
- East end: US 34 at the Iowa state line near Bellevue

Location
- Country: United States
- State: Nebraska
- Counties: Dundy, Hitchcock, Red Willow, Furnas, Harlan, Phelps, Kearney, Adams, Hall, Merrick, Hamilton, York, Seward, Lancaster, Cass, Sarpy

Highway system
- United States Numbered Highway System; List; Special; Divided; Nebraska State Highway System; Interstate; US; State; Link; Spur; State Spurs; Recreation
| ← N-33 | → N-35 |

In the U.S. state of Nebraska, U.S. Highway 34 is a highway which goes between the Colorado border west of Haigler to the Iowa border east of Plattsmouth. Between Culbertson and Hastings, U.S. 34 overlaps U.S. Highway 6. From Grand Island to Lincoln, U.S. 34 has been replaced by Interstate 80 as a high-speed corridor and mostly serves local traffic. On this portion of the highway, U.S. 34 is continuously north of Interstate 80. Within Lincoln, U.S. 34 runs concurrent with all of Interstate 180, and much of it follows O Street.

== Route description ==
U.S. Highway 34 begins west of Haigler. At Haigler, it meets Nebraska Highway 27, which connects with K-27 in Kansas. It continues east to Benkelman, where it intersects and overlaps with Nebraska Highway 61 and briefly turns north. After leaving Benkelman, the overlap ends, and U.S. 34 continues northeast through Max and Stratton before meeting Nebraska Highway 25 in Trenton. Before reaching Culbertson, it intersects U.S. Highway 6.

U.S. 34 and U.S. 6 then pass through Culbertson, where they intersect Nebraska Highway 17. They go east together through McCook, where they meet U.S. Highway 83 and briefly overlap. They continue east through Indianola and Bartley, and at Cambridge, intersect the southern segment of Nebraska Highway 47. After passing through Holbrook, they intersect U.S. Highway 283 in Arapahoe.

After Arapahoe, U.S. 34 and U.S. 6 continue east, intersecting U.S. Highway 136, Nebraska Highway 46 and Nebraska Highway 4 before turning northeast. After passing through Atlanta, they meet Nebraska Highway 23 and U.S. Highway 183 in Holdrege. They continue northeasterly through Funk before intersecting and overlapping Nebraska Highway 44 through Axtell. They then continue through Minden, where they intersect Nebraska Highway 10. They continue going northeast through Heartwell, where the road turns due east. At Hastings, U.S. 34 and U.S. 6 intersect U.S. Highway 281, and U.S. 34 then turns north with U.S. 281. U.S. 34 and U.S. 281 then follow a divided highway; this section of U.S. 281 is designated the Tom Osborne Expressway after the former Nebraska Cornhuskers football coach and U.S. Representative, who is a native of Hastings. The routes continue north toward Grand Island, intersecting Interstate 80 south of the city near the Interstate's crossing of the Platte River. At the southern end of Grand Island, U.S. 34 ends its overlap with U.S. 281 and turns east, overlapping the western segment of Nebraska Highway 2.

U.S. 34 and Nebraska Highway 2 continue east through the southern portion of Grand Island, where they briefly enter Merrick County while crossing the Platte River. The two highways end their overlap shortly after this crossing. U.S. 34 then continues east through Aurora and intersecting Nebraska Highway 14 there. It then passes through Hampton and Bradshaw before meeting U.S. Highway 81 in York. After passing through Waco, U.S. 34 then intersects Nebraska Highway 69. It then continues through Utica and Tamora before meeting Nebraska Highway 15 in Seward. U.S. 34 continues east and becomes a divided highway when it intersects Nebraska Highway 79.

U.S. 34 passes north of the Lincoln Airport as the Purple Heart Highway before it curves south towards downtown Lincoln and intersects with Interstate 80 and U.S. Highway 77. At I-80, a new overlap begins with Interstate 180, which overlaps U.S. 34 for its entire length to downtown. U.S. 34 then becomes a pair of one-way streets, North 9th Street and North 10th Streets, where Interstate 180 ends. U.S. 34 turns east on "O" Street in downtown Lincoln just a few blocks later.

U.S. 34 then continues due east from Lincoln, intersecting Nebraska Highway 43 in Eagle. It then intersects Nebraska Highway 63 east of Eagle and then Nebraska Highway 1 near Elmwood. It then intersects Nebraska Highway 50 and Nebraska Highway 67 before passing through Union. It then turns north with U.S. 75, intersects Nebraska Highway 1 again near Murray, and then intersects Nebraska Highway 66 in Plattsmouth. It then passes through Plattsmouth and over the Platte River, then splits from U.S. 75 just south of Bellevue, turning east where it enters Iowa.

== History ==
U.S. 34 was realigned onto a new divided highway northwest of Lincoln in late 1963, shortly after the opening of I-180, which was also incorporated into U.S. 34. The highway's former alignment was demolished to make way for an expansion of the Lincoln Air Force Base (now Lincoln Airport). In 1997, this 4-mile (6.4 km) section of U.S. 34 was designated as the Purple Heart Highway.

Prior to 2014, U.S. 34 entered Iowa at the Plattsmouth Bridge east of Plattsmouth. A new bridge was built near La Platte and opened to traffic on October 22, 2014, bringing it more in line with the current U.S. 34 alignment near Glenwood, Iowa.

== Major intersections ==
| County | Location | mi | km | Exit | Destinations | Notes |
|---|---|---|---|---|---|---|
| Dundy | | 0.00 | 0.00 | | US 34 west – Wray | Continuation into Colorado |
| Dundy | Haigler | 7.50 | 12.07 | | N-27 south – St. Francis | |
| Dundy | Benkelman | 28.51 | 45.88 | | N-61 south – Bird City | Western end of N-61 overlap |
| Dundy | Benkelman | 31.49 | 50.68 | | N-61 north – Imperial | Eastern end of N-61 overlap |
| Hitchcock | Trenton | 60.88 | 97.98 | | N-25 (Main Street) – Hayes Center, Atwood | |
| Hitchcock | | 68.24 | 109.82 | | US 6 west – Palisade, Imperial | Western end of US 6 overlap |
| Hitchcock | | 68.65 | 110.48 | | L-44C west | |
| Hitchcock | Culbertson | 71.16 | 114.52 | | N-17 south – Herndon | |
| Red Willow | McCook | 81.91 | 131.82 | | US 83 north – North Platte | Western end of US 83 overlap |
| Red Willow | McCook | 83.34 | 134.12 | | US 83 south (6th Street) – Oberlin | Eastern end of US 83 overlap |
| Furnas | Cambridge | 108.51 | 174.63 | | N-47 south (Patterson Street) | |
| Furnas | Arapahoe | 122.99 | 197.93 | | US 283 (Nebraska Avenue) – Elwood, Norton | |
| Furnas | | 129.19 | 207.91 | | US 136 east – Edison, Oxford | |
| Furnas | | 137.12 | 220.67 | | N-46 south – Oxford | |
| Harlan | | 141.59 | 227.87 | | N-4 east – Beatrice | |
| Phelps | Holdrege | 154.29 | 248.31 | | N-23 west (4th Avenue) | |
| Phelps | Holdrege | 154.89 | 249.27 | | US 183 (Burlington Street) | |
| Kearney | Axtell | 166.73 | 268.33 | | N-44 south (21 Road) | Western end of N-44 overlap |
| Kearney | Axtell | 170.81 | 274.89 | | N-44 north (25 Road) | Eastern end of N-44 overlap |
| Kearney | Minden | 177.91 | 286.32 | | N-10 | |
| Kearney | | 178.91 | 287.93 | | Truck Route to N-74 east | |
| Adams | Kenesaw | 194.53 | 313.07 | | S-1A north (Smith Way) | |
| Adams | Juniata | 202.51 | 325.91 | | S-1B north (Juniata Avenue) | |
| Adams | Hastings | 206.01 | 331.54 | | S-1C north | |
| Adams | Hastings | 208.00 | 334.74 | | US 281 south (Baltimore Avenue) – Red Cloud | Western end of US 281 overlap |
| Adams | Hastings | 208.50 | 335.55 | | US 6 east (J Street east) | Eastern end of US 6 overlap |
| Adams | Hastings | 212.78 | 342.44 | | County Truck Route (42nd Street) to US 6 east | |
| Adams | Trumbull | 216.73 | 348.79 | | S-1D east | |
| Hall | | 226.15 | 363.95 | | I-80 | Exit 312 along I-80 |
| Hall | Grand Island | 230.83 | 371.48 | | US 281 north / N-2 west | Eastern end of US 281 overlap, western end of N-2 overlap |
| Merrick | Platte River | 236.50 | 380.61 | Bridge | | |
| Hamilton | | 237.48 | 382.19 | | N-2 east | Eastern end of N-2 overlap |
| Hamilton | Phillips | 240.01 | 386.26 | | S-41A north (Phillips Spur) | |
| Hamilton | Giltner | 243.50 | 391.88 | | S-41B south (Giltner Spur) | |
| Hamilton | Aurora | 251.46 | 404.69 | | N-14 (16th Street) | |
| Hamilton | Hampton | 257.50 | 414.41 | | L-41D south (W Road) | |
| York | Henderson | 261.63 | 421.05 | | S-93A north (Road B) | |
| York | York | 271.67 | 437.21 | | US 81 south | Western end of US 81 overlap |
| York | York | 273.07 | 439.46 | | US 81 north | Eastern end of US 81 overlap |
| York | Waco | 280.21 | 450.95 | | L-93B south (Road S) | |
| York | Waco | 283.20 | 455.77 | | N-69 north (Road V) | |
| Seward | Utica | 286.16 | 460.53 | | L-80F south (Centennial Avenue) | |
| Seward | Tamora | 293.19 | 471.84 | | L-80G south | |
| Seward | Seward | 299.38 | 481.81 | | N-15 (6th Street) | |
| Seward | Garland | 305.76 | 492.07 | | S-80D north | |
| Lancaster | Malcolm | 314.12 | 505.53 | | S-55M north | |
| Lancaster | Lincoln | 316.27 | 508.99 | | N-79 north (NW 56th Street) | |
| Lancaster | Lincoln | 317.61 | 511.14 | | S-55C south (NW 31st Street) | |
| Lancaster | Lincoln | 317.92 | 511.64 | | NW 27th Street | Interchange; westbound exit and eastbound entrance |
| Lancaster | Lincoln | 320.71 | 516.13 | 401C-D | I-80 / US 77 / I-180 begins – Omaha, Lincoln Airport | Western end of I-180 overlap; exit numbers based on I-80 mileage; signed as 401C (west) and 401D (east) |
| Lancaster | Lincoln | 321.12 | 516.79 | 1 | Superior Street | Exit numbers follow I-180 |
| Lancaster | Lincoln | 322.48 | 518.98 | 2 | To US 6 (Cornhusker Highway) – Lincoln Airport | Exit numbers follow I-180 |
| Lancaster | Lincoln | 323.90 | 521.27 | | I-180 ends / R Street | Eastern end of I-180 overlap |
| Lancaster | Lincoln | 323.98 | 521.40 | | 10th Street – University of Nebraska–Lincoln, Memorial Stadium | Interchange; westbound exit and eastbound entrance |
| Cass | Eagle | 338.90 | 545.41 | | N-43 south (214th Street) | |
| Cass | Eagle | 340.91 | 548.64 | | N-63 north (238th Street) | |
| Cass | Elmwood | 345.89 | 556.66 | | N-1 east (298th Street) | |
| Cass | | 351.92 | 566.36 | | N-50 | |
| Cass | Avoca | 354.93 | 571.20 | | S-13C south (132nd Street) | |
| Cass | | 360.92 | 580.84 | | N-67 south (60th Street) | |
| Cass | Nehawka | 361.90 | 582.42 | | S-13D north (48th Street) | |
| Cass | Union | 365.93 | 588.91 | | US 75 south | Western end of US 75 overlap |
| Cass | Murray | 372.97 | 600.24 | | N-1 west | |
| Cass | Plattsmouth | 379.00 | 609.94 | | N-66 | |
| Cass | | 382.02 | 614.80 | — | Webster Boulevard / Bay Road – Plattsmouth | Western end of freeway |
| Platte River | | 383.17 | 616.65 | Bridge | | |
| Sarpy | Bellevue | 384.89 | 619.42 | | US 75 north (Kennedy Freeway north) | Interchange; eastern end of US 75 overlap; eastern end of freeway section; future eastern terminus of South Sarpy Expressway |
| Missouri River | | 387.83 | 624.15 | Nebraska–Iowa line | | |
| Missouri River | | 387.83 | 624.15 | | US 34 east – Glenwood | Continuation into Iowa |
1.000 mi = 1.609 km; 1.000 km = 0.621 mi: Concurrency terminus; Incomplete access

== See also ==
- U.S. Route 34
- Interstate 180 (Nebraska)

U.S. Route 34
| Previous state: Colorado | Nebraska | Next state: Iowa |
