= North Freeway =

North Freeway may refer to:

- North Freeway (Fort Worth, Texas), a section of Interstate 35W in Tarrant County, Texas
- North Freeway (Houston, Texas), a section of Interstate 45 in Harris County, Texas
- North Freeway (Omaha, Nebraska), a section of U.S. Route 75 in Douglas County, Nebraska
