= South Sarpy Expressway =

Route information
- Existed: 2026–present

Major junctions
- West end: I-80 near Gretna
- N-31 near Gretna; N-50 near Springfield
- East end: US 75 / US 34 in Bellevue

Location
- Country: United States
- State: Nebraska
- County: Sarpy

Highway system
- Nebraska State Highway System; Interstate; US; State; Link; Spur; State Spurs; Recreation

The South Sarpy Expressway is a limited-access divided highway currently under construction in Sarpy County, Nebraska.

== Route description ==
The proposed highway will terminate on its western end at Interstate 80 (I-80) approximately two miles (3.2 km) southwest of I-80 exit 432. From there, it will head east, first crossing N-31 near its intersection with Pflug Road, then meeting N-50 just south of Springfield. At 132nd Street, the expressway will angle northeast until it reaches 108th Street and Platteview Road, at which point it will turn east again. After it crosses 42nd Street, it will head ESE until its freeway portion ends at 10th Street and Hidden Valley Drive. Its eastern terminus will be at the interchange with US Highway 75 (US 75, Kennedy Freeway) and US 34.

== History ==
When the project was first created, the highway was originally going to be called the Platteview Road Expressway, as it parallels Platteview Road from 108th Street to 42nd Street. The project also mandates that the expressway be paralleled by a permanent frontage road both during and after construction. The building phase is expected to commence in early 2026. The frontage road represents the initial phase of construction, while the segment between 42nd Street and 10th Street, which includes the 36th Street exit, will be the first portion of the expressway built. As of March 2026, the expressway portion west of 42nd Street has not yet been funded or officially designed.

== Exit list ==
The entire route is in Sarpy County.

| Location | mi | km | Destinations | Notes |
|---|---|---|---|---|
| Melia-Forest City Precinct | | | I-80 – Omaha, Lincoln | Unfunded interchange; proposed western terminus; to be I-80 exit 430 |
| Melia-Forest City Precinct | | | N-31 | Unfunded interchanges |
| Melia-Forest City–Platford-Springfield II precinct line | | | 204th Street | Unfunded interchanges |
| Platford-Springfield II Precinct | | | 192nd Street | Unfunded interchanges |
| Platford-Springfield II Precinct | | | 180th Street | Unfunded interchanges |
| Platford-Springfield II Precinct | | | 168th Street | Unfunded interchanges |
| Platford-Springfield II Precinct | | | 156th Street | Unfunded interchanges |
| Platford-Springfield II–Platford-Springfield I precinct line | | | N-50 | Unfunded interchanges |
| Platford-Springfield I Precinct | | | 132nd Street | Unfunded interchanges |
| Platford-Springfield I–Fairview precinct line | | | 120th Street | Unfunded interchanges |
| Fairview Precinct | | | 108th Street / Platteview Road | Unfunded interchanges |
| Fairview Precinct | | | 96th Street | Unfunded interchanges |
| Fairview Precinct | | | 84th Street | Unfunded interchanges |
| Fairview Precinct | | | 72nd Street | Unfunded interchanges |
| LaPlatte I–LaPlatte II precinct line | | | 57th Street | Unfunded interchanges |
| LaPlatte I–LaPlatte II precinct line | | | 42th Street | Unfunded interchanges |
| LaPlatte I Precinct | | | 36th Street | Planned interchange |
| Bellevue | | | 10th Street | Planned east end of freeway |
| Bellevue | | | US 75 (Kennedy Freeway) / US 34 | Interchange; planned eastern terminus; highway continues as US 34 east |
1.000 mi = 1.609 km; 1.000 km = 0.621 mi: Unopened
