= Interstate 180 (Nebraska) =

Interstate Highway in Lincoln, Nebraska

Interstate 180
- Map of Lincoln with I-180 highlighted in red

Route information
- Auxiliary route of I-80
- Maintained by NDOT
- Length: 3.47 mi (5.58 km)
- Existed: 1956–present
- History: Completed in 1964
- NHS: Entire route

Major junctions
- South end: US 34 in Lincoln
- North end: I-80 / US 34 / US 77 in Lincoln

Location
- Country: United States
- State: Nebraska
- Counties: Lancaster

Highway system
- Interstate Highway System; Main; Auxiliary; Suffixed; Business; Future; Nebraska State Highway System; Interstate; US; State; Link; Spur; State Spurs; Recreation
← US 159	→ US 183

Interstate 180 (I-180) is a short auxiliary Interstate Highway in Lincoln, Nebraska, United States. The north–south spur freeway connects I-80 to downtown Lincoln, running for 3.5 miles (5.6 km) while entirely concurrent to U.S. Route 34 (US 34). I-180 has two intermediate interchanges at Cornhusker Highway and Superior Street, both located north of Oak Creek. It is the only auxiliary interstate highway completely in the state of Nebraska.

It was proposed in the 1950s and construction began in 1961 as part of the Lincoln Access Highway project. On 27 July 1963, the southern section between December 1963 and January 1964 underwent a two-phase opening after the northern section between Cornhusker Highway and I-80. The southern section, which includes a viaduct over a downtown railroad, was rebuilt from 1996 to 1998, while the Oak Creek crossing was rebuilt between 2001 and 2003.

== Route description ==
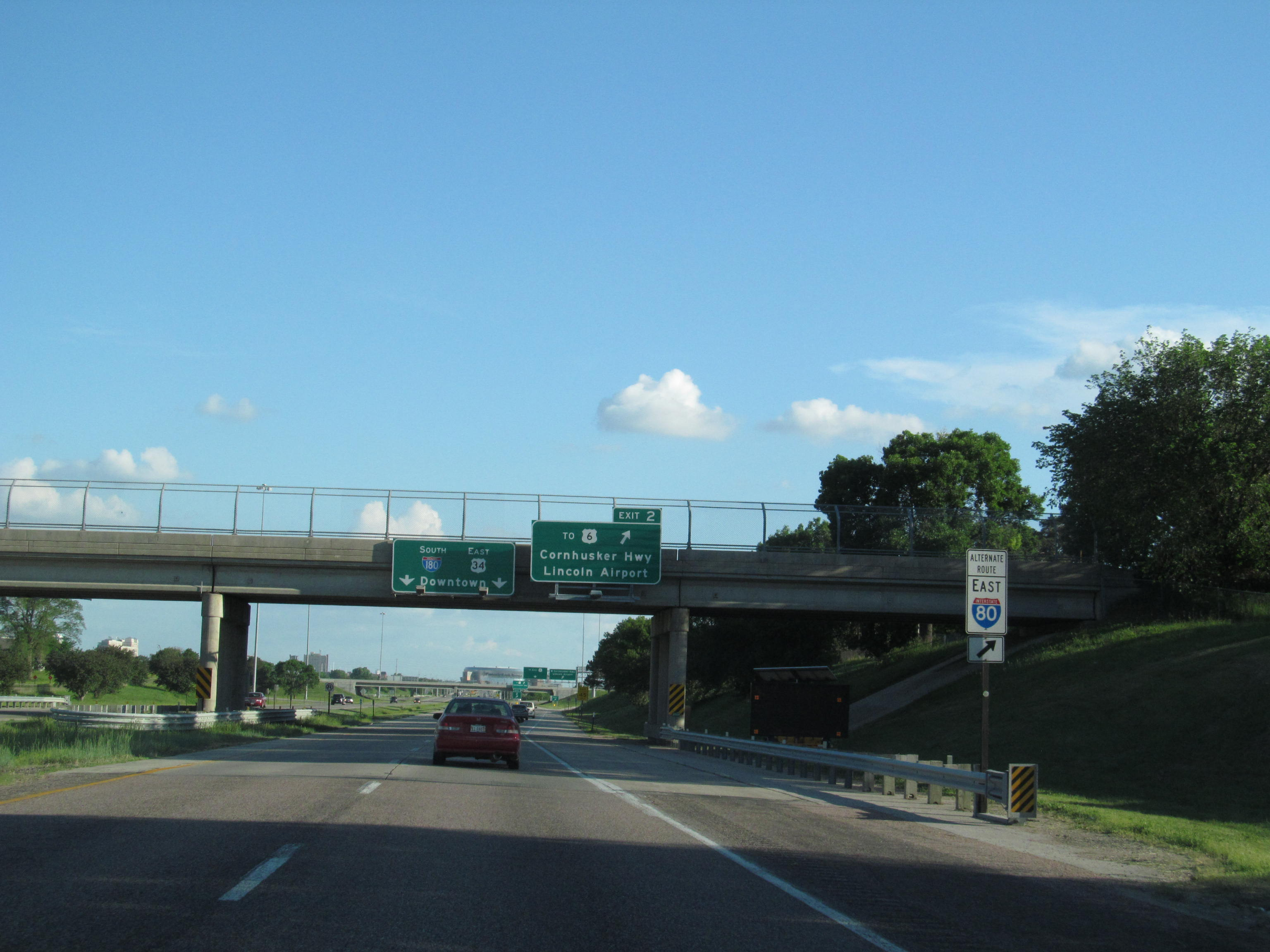
Looking southbound on I-180 at its interchange with Cornhusker Highway

I-180 begins at R Street in downtown Lincoln as a continuation of North 9th Street and North 10th Street, a pair of one-way streets which carry the southbound and northbound lanes of US 34, respectively. The four-lane freeway carries I-180 and US 34 northwest over a three-track railroad, skirting the western side of the University of Nebraska campus and passing near Memorial Stadium (home to the Nebraska Cornhuskers football team) and Pinnacle Bank Arena. It continues north between Haymarket Park to the west and residential areas to the east, crossing over Salt Creek and under US 6 near Oak Lake. After crossing Oak Creek, I-180 reaches an interchange with Cornhusker Highway that provides access to US 6 and the Belmont neighborhood.

The freeway bisects Max E. Roper Park, which lies between residential neighborhoods in West Lincoln and Belmont along a small stream. I-180 then intersects Superior Street before reaching its terminus at a cloverleaf interchange with I-80 and US 77 near Lincoln Airport. US 34 continues northwest from the interchange on a four-lane divided roadway named the Purple Heart Highway.

As a component of the Interstate Highway System, the entirety of I-180 is listed as part of the National Highway System, a national network of roads identified as important to the national economy, defense, and mobility; The freeway is maintained by the Nebraska Department of Transportation (NDOT), which conducts an annual survey of traffic volume that is expressed in terms of annual average daily traffic (AADT), a measure of traffic volume for any average day of the year. Average traffic volumes on the highway in 2018 ranged from a minimum of 30,310 vehicles at its northern terminus with I-80 to a maximum of 33,410 vehicles south of Cornhuskers Highway.

== History ==
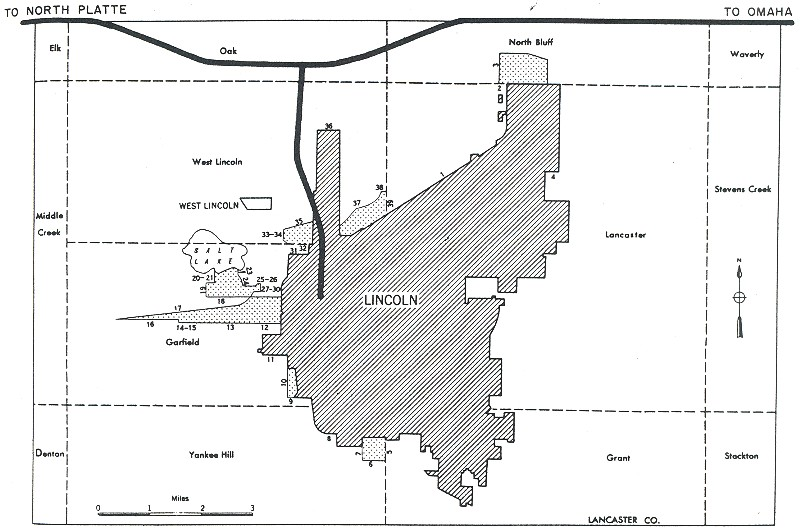
A map of Lincoln from the 1955 Bureau of Public Roads plan, showing a north–south spur route

In its 1955 plan for a national system of grade-separated superhighways, the federal Bureau of Public Roads (BPR) recommended an east–west corridor bypassing Lincoln with a north–south spur connecting it to the city center. The plan later formed the basis of the Interstate Highway System, which was approved by Congress through the Federal-Aid Highway Act of 1956. The north–south spur, later numbered I-180, was planned to generally follow the 10th Street corridor in downtown Lincoln and would include the replacement of a bridge crossing the city's northern railyard as well as a pair of one-way streets. The freeway would have three interchanges at Oak Street (now Cornhusker Highway), Superior Street, and I-80.

The city council and Nebraska Department of Roads (now NDOT) studied seven routes drawn by planning consultants for I-180 in 1958. The city proposed a connection further west on 7th Street, which the state highway engineer opposed due to its higher cost, whereas the state and BPR preferred a route along 9th and 10th streets. Governor Ralph Brooks imposed a January 1, 1960, deadline for a routing decision in lieu of a proposed deferral of planning funds for the project. The city council approved the state's route using 9th and 10th in December 1959, but modified the preferred route a year later to veer west from downtown and avoid properties along 10th Street at the request of the University of Nebraska Regents.

Construction of I-180, also named the Lincoln Access Highway, began in 1961 and was estimated to cost $7.068 million (equivalent to $56.6 million in 2024 dollars), with completion set for December 1962. By the end of 1962, damp weather and a strike by a local engineers' union slowed construction of the freeway, particularly the bridges over the Lincoln railyard. The northern section between Oak Street and I-80 opened to traffic on July 27, 1963, one month before the start of the Nebraska State Fair. U.S. 34 was later realigned onto I-180 in late 1963 after a new highway bypassing the Lincoln Air Force Base (now Lincoln Airport) opened to traffic.

The southern section from 9th Street to Oak Street opened to southbound traffic on December 11, 1963, with weighted oil drums in place of guardrails awaiting installation. The opening was made feasible through the use of temporary asphalt in place of concrete amid the cold weather, as well as leaving the shoulders unpaved until asphalt could be laid. The northbound lanes opened for traffic on January 15, 1964, marking the completion of I-180. The new freeway led to residential development north of the city, particularly in the Belmont neighborhood.

The southern section of I-180 was rebuilt by the state government during a multi-year project in the late 1990s to replace the viaducts in downtown Lincoln with modern bridges with full-sized shoulders and a lower slope at a cost of $15 million (equivalent to $27.1 million in 2024 dollars). The project and its proposed detours on local streets were opposed by the downtown chamber of commerce, who feared its negative effects on business access. The southbound lanes closed on December 1, 1996, following the end of the 1996 football season to prevent disruption around home games for the Nebraska Cornhuskers. The new southbound bridge opened on June 10, 1997, having been completed 61 days ahead of schedule by contractor Hawkins Construction, who earned a $1.2 million bonus. The northbound viaduct was closed on November 16, 1997, and its replacement opened on May 28, 1998. The project was completed 72 days ahead of schedule by Hawkins Construction, who earned another bonus.

The Oak Creek bridge and interchange with Cornhusker Highway were rebuilt from 2001 to 2003 by the state government at a cost of $12 million. Construction was briefly delayed due to the discovery of nesting cliff swallows, a protected migratory bird species, under the old bridge in June 2003, which prevented demolition work from continuing. The U.S. Fish and Wildlife Service granted permission to remove the cliff swallow nests, along with others found belonging to barn swallows and common grackles, preventing a month-long work stoppage. The project replaced the existing northbound bridge with a widened roadway and moved a ramp at the interchange to improve traffic flow.

== Exit list ==
The entire route is in Lincoln, Lancaster County.

mi	km	Exit	Destinations	Notes
3.47	5.58		US 34 east (9th Street) / R Street	At-grade intersection; one-way street, southbound entrance; southern terminus of I-180; south end of US 34 overlap; highway continues as US 34
3.47	5.58		US 34 (10th Street) / S Street	At-grade intersection; one-way street, northbound exit; southern terminus of I-180; south end of US 34 overlap
2.05	3.30	2	To US 6 / Cornhusker Highway – Lincoln Airport	Former US 77
0.79	1.27	1	Superior Street	
0.28– 0.00	0.45– 0.00	401C-D	US 34 west (Purple Heart Highway) / I-80 / US 77 – Omaha, Lincoln Airport, Air Park	Northern terminus of I-180; north end of US 34 overlap; exit numbers based on I-80 mileage; signed as 401C (west) and 401D (east); highway continues as US 34 (Purple Heart Highway)
1.000 mi = 1.609 km; 1.000 km = 0.621 mi: Concurrency terminus
