= Tamora, Nebraska =

Census-designated place in Seward County Nebraska, United States

Tamora
- Census-designated place
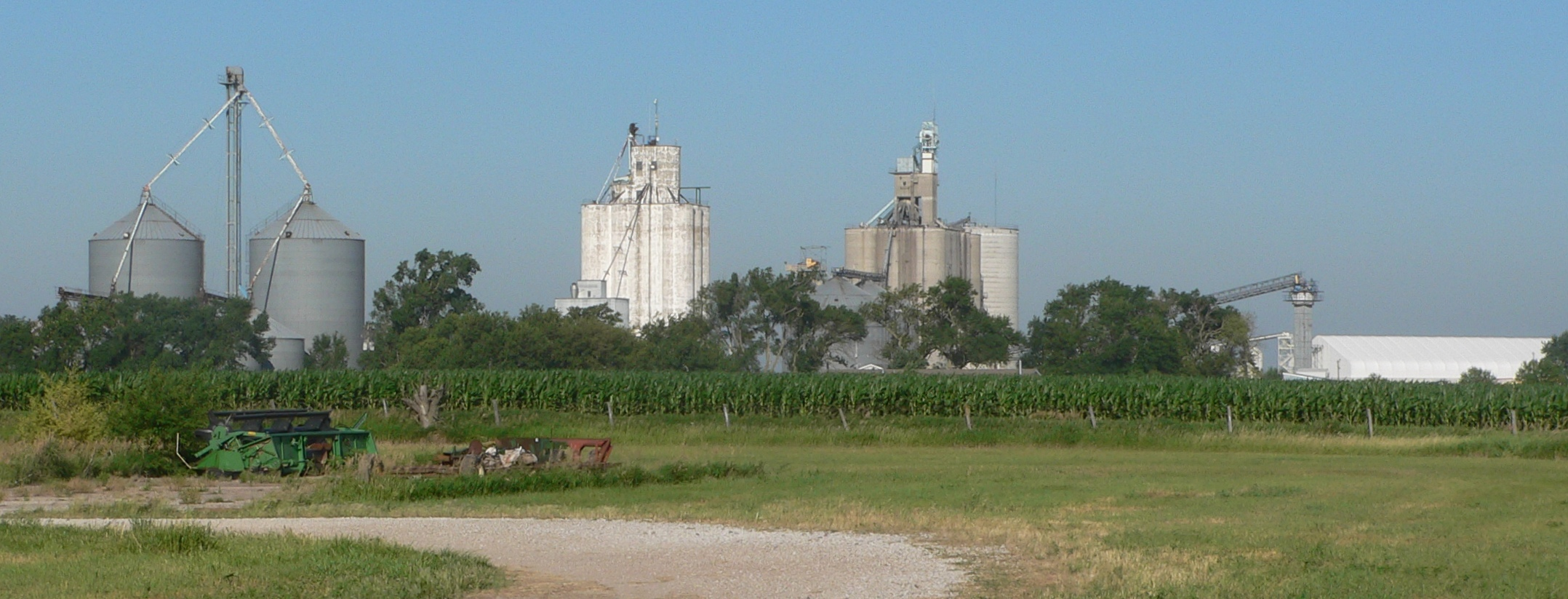
- View of Tamora from the northeast, July 2010

- Location within Nebraska Location within the United States
- Coordinates: 40°53′40″N 97°13′31″W
- Country: United States
- State: Nebraska
- County: Seward
- First settled: 1879

Area
  - Total: 1.00 sq mi (2.58 km^{2})
  - Land: 0.99 sq mi (2.56 km^{2})
  - Water: 0.0077 sq mi (0.02 km^{2})
- Elevation: 1,558 ft (475 m)

Population (2020)
  - Total: 44
  - Density: 44.5/sq mi (17.19/km^{2})
- Time zone: UTC-6 (Central (CST))
  - Summer (DST): UTC-5 (CDT)
- ZIP code: 68434
- Area code: 402
- FIPS code: 31-48340
- GNIS feature ID: 2583900

Tamora (/təˈmɔːrə/ tə-MOR-ə) is a census-designated place in Seward County, Nebraska, United States. The community presently consists of a large grain elevator complex and a small residential district, with a population of 44 according to the 2020 census.

== History ==
In 1877, the Burlington Railroad extended its tracks westward from Seward, Nebraska. In 1879, four men each donated 10 acres (4.0 ha) of land for a townsite, in order to persuade the railroad to build a siding and station there. A dispute arose over the name of the new town, since each of the four wanted it to bear his name. The name eventually chosen was a frontier pronunciation of "tomorrow", apparently because the selection of the name had to be deferred until later.

Within three years of the town's founding, three grain elevators had been constructed. In 1884, the population was estimated at 53; the town was incorporated in 1888. Eventually, Tamora's commercial district consisted of over thirty businesses, including two banks and the Tamora Times newspaper.

In 1892, an abortive attempt was made to bring the Seward County seat to Tamora. A group of local promoters purchased a quarter-block and began construction of a building that they hoped would become the courthouse. However, support for the idea failed to materialize, and the building project was abandoned. A few years later, an attempt was made to build an opera house on the unfinished foundation. This, too, failed; and the basement was eventually filled in.

By 1920, Tamora had a population of over 200. However, it lacked a fire department. Many of its commercial buildings were destroyed by fire and not replaced. The population steadily declined, to a low of 50 in 1980. The post office was closed in 1970.

Even as the retail sector and the population declined, the grain storage and loading facilities were expanded. In 1962, the local farmers' cooperative built a concrete grain elevator; in 1964, they replaced a feed mill that had burned down. In 1978, they built one of the largest grain elevators in Nebraska.

Disharmony on the village board led to a number of recall attempts and, eventually, a petition to unincorporate the town, which was rejected by the voters in a 1990 election. Feuding on the board continued; and in 1997, Tamora's electors voted 30-6 in favor of unincorporation.

In 1990, the last decennial census before its unincorporation, the population of Tamora was reported as 51. In 2007, the population was estimated at 70.

== Geography ==
Tamora lies 6 miles (10 km) west of the county seat of Seward, about halfway between Seward and Utica. It is located approximately one-half mile (0.8 km) south of U.S. Route 34, on the BNSF Railway.

== Demographics ==
Historical population
| Census | Pop. | Note | %± |
|---|---|---|---|
| 2020 | 44 | | — |
U.S. Decennial Census

== Economy ==
Tamora has no commercial district. Its principal business is the grain elevator operated by United Farmers Cooperative. The elevator has unit train capability. It has a capacity of 2,318,000 US bushels (81,700 m^{3}), and its siding has space for 110 railroad cars.

== See also ==
- List of census-designated places in Nebraska
