= Sunol, Nebraska =

- Census-designated place
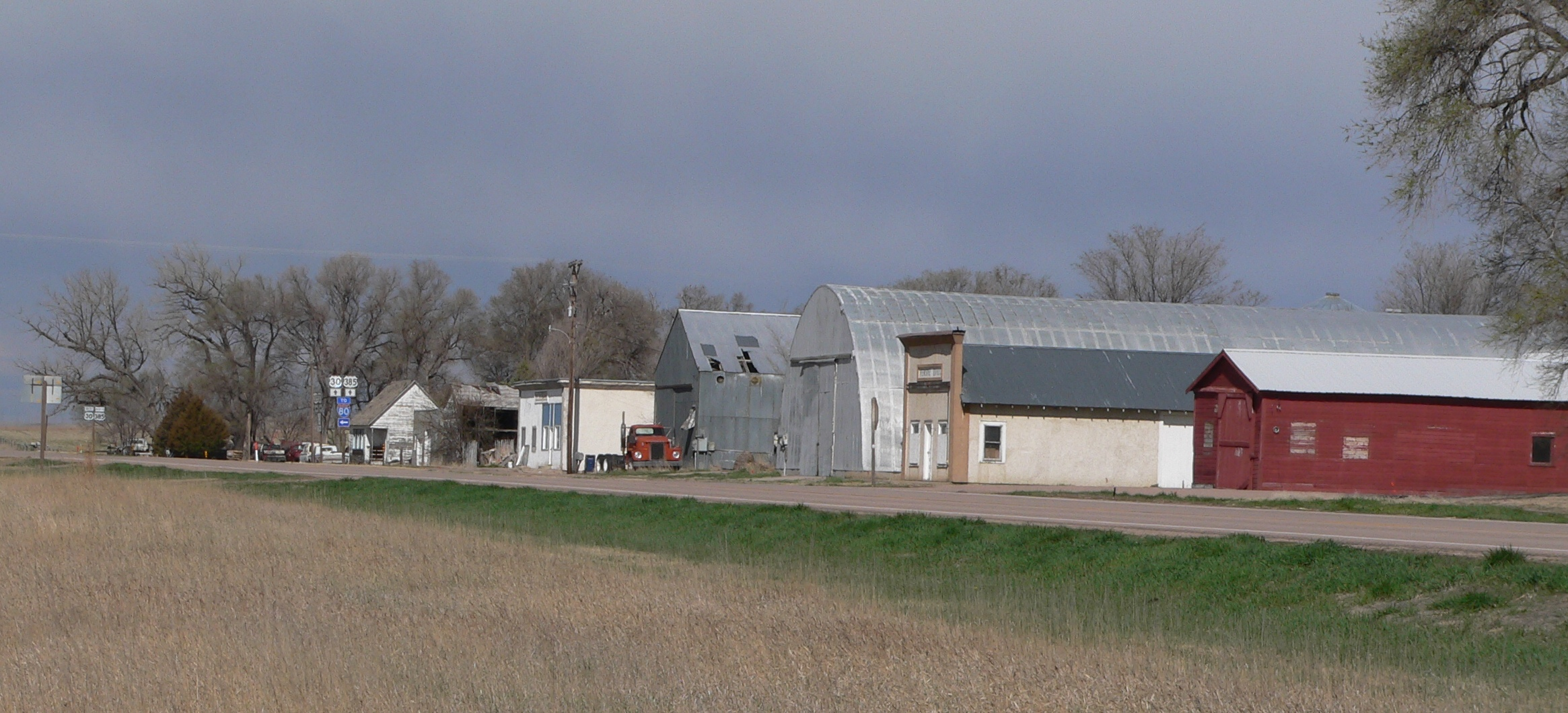
- Downtown Sunol: north side of U.S. Highway 30/385

- Location within Nebraska
- Coordinates: 41°09′19″N 102°44′39″W
- Country: United States
- State: Nebraska
- County: Cheyenne

Area
  - Total: 2.19 sq mi (5.67 km^{2})
  - Land: 2.19 sq mi (5.66 km^{2})
  - Water: 0.0039 sq mi (0.01 km^{2})
- Elevation: 3,924 ft (1,196 m)

Population (2020)
  - Total: 57
  - Density: 26.1/sq mi (10.06/km^{2})
- Time zone: UTC-7 (Mountain (MST))
  - Summer (DST): UTC-6 (MDT)
- Area code: 308
- GNIS feature ID: 2583899

Sunol is an unincorporated community and census-designated place in Cheyenne County, Nebraska, United States. As of the 2020 census, Sunol had a population of 57. Sunol is located in the valley of Lodgepole Creek on U.S. routes 30 and 385, 11 miles (18 km) east of Sidney, the county seat. Interstate 80 is 3 miles (5 km) to the south via Nebraska Link 17E.

== History ==
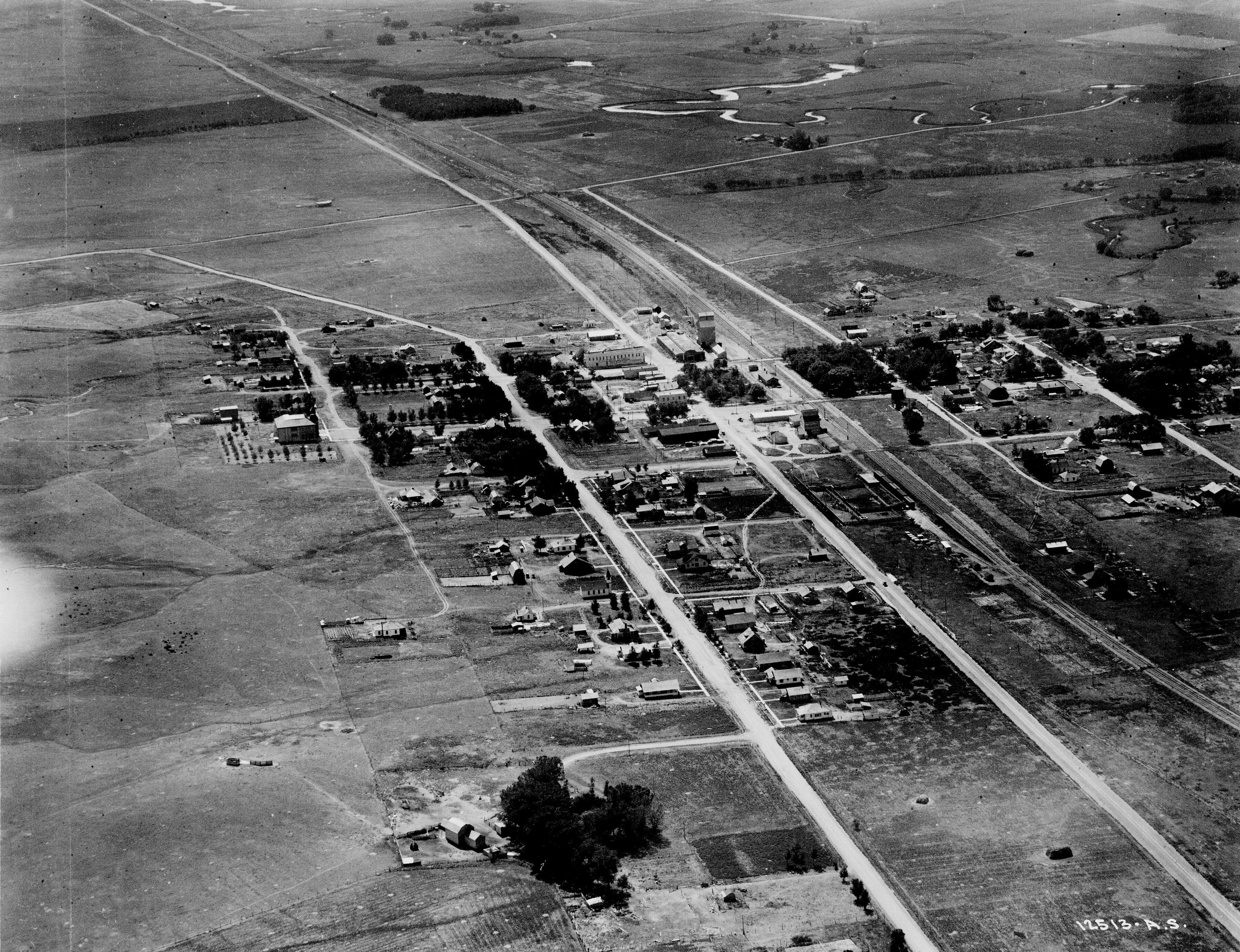
Sunol in 1925

Sunol was platted in 1909. A post office was established at Sunol in 1910, and remained in operation until it was discontinued in 1973.

== Demographics ==
Historical population
Census	Pop.	Note	%±
2020	57		—
U.S. Decennial Census
