= Union, Nebraska =

- Village
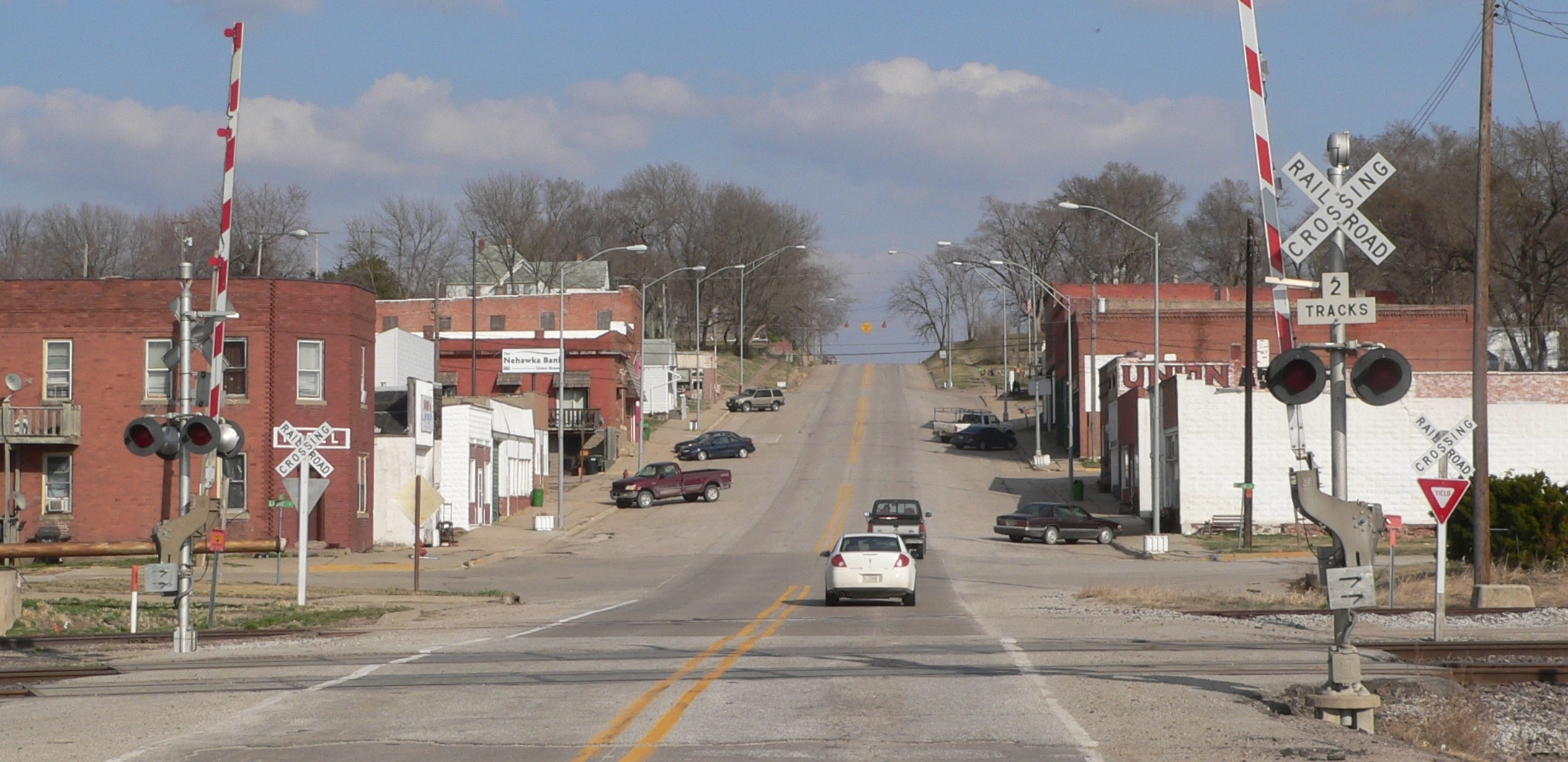
- Downtown Union, seen from the west along U.S. Route 34.

- Location of Union, Nebraska
- Coordinates: 40°48′52″N 95°55′17″W
- Country: United States
- State: Nebraska
- County: Cass
- Laid out: 1890
- Incorporated: 1892

Area
  - Total: 0.21 sq mi (0.54 km^{2})
  - Land: 0.21 sq mi (0.54 km^{2})
  - Water: 0 sq mi (0.00 km^{2})
- Elevation: 1,017 ft (310 m)

Population (2020)
  - Total: 195
  - Estimate (2025): 200
  - Density: 938.9/sq mi (362.51/km^{2})
- Time zone: UTC-6 (Central (CST))
  - Summer (DST): UTC-5 (CDT)
- ZIP code: 68455
- Area code: 402
- FIPS code: 31-49635
- GNIS feature ID: 2400021
- Website: www.unionnebraska.com

Union is a village in southeast Cass County, Nebraska, United States. The population was 195 at the 2020 census. The village grew up around a Missouri Pacific Railroad junction in the early 1890s and lies at the meeting of U.S. Route 34 and U.S. Route 75. Cass County is an outlying county of the Omaha, NE–IA metropolitan statistical area.

== History ==
Settlement in southeastern Cass County dates from the mid-1850s, and a scattered community known as Stringtown stood along Weeping Water Creek before Union was founded. The town itself began with the railroad: in 1887 the Missouri Pacific Railroad surveyed a line between Nebraska City and Lincoln across the county, and a store opened at the site that year. The Pleasant Grove post office was moved to the new rail point in 1888, the same year that William Todd began publishing the weekly Union Ledger.

Union was laid out in 1890, when the Missouri Pacific began building a second line north toward Omaha. Sources differ whether the town was named for patriotic reasons after the federal union, or from its location at the railroad junction, a "union" of rails. The Cass County commissioners approved the village's organization under a board of five trustees in 1892.

The village became a shipping point for the surrounding farmland, and by 1893 eight passenger trains a day called at Union. Its businesses included general stores, a furniture and hardware store, a stationery and drug store, a harness shop and a millinery, along with a brick manufacturer and a sawmill. Fires in the business district forced parts of the town to be rebuilt more than once.

A schoolhouse was built in 1889 at a contract price of $2,747; it burned in 1912 and was replaced by a larger brick building, which served the village until the district consolidated with the Nebraska City schools in 1956. The village's Old Settlers Picnic, first held in 1889, has continued as an annual community event.

== Geography ==
Union is in southeastern Cass County, roughly 10 miles (16 km) north-northwest of Nebraska City and 13 miles (21 km) south-southwest of Plattsmouth, the county seat. The village stands near Weeping Water Creek, a tributary of the Missouri River, in rolling farmland a few miles west of the river valley.

According to the United States Census Bureau, the village has a total area of 0.21 square miles (0.54 km^{2}), all land.

== Demographics ==
Historical population
Census	Pop.	Note	%±
1900	282		—
1910	302		7.1%
1920	292		−3.3%
1930	316		8.2%
1940	364		15.2%
1950	277		−23.9%
1960	303		9.4%
1970	275		−9.2%
1980	307		11.6%
1990	299		−2.6%
2000	260		−13.0%
2010	233		−10.4%
2020	195		−16.3%
2025 (est.)	200		2.6%
U.S. Decennial Census

=== 2020 census ===
As of the 2020 census, there were 195 people, 82 households and 49 families living in the village. The population density was 937.5 inhabitants per square mile (362.0/km^{2}). There were 90 housing units, of which 82 (91.1%) were occupied and 8 were vacant; 69 of the occupied units were owner-occupied and 13 were renter-occupied.

The racial makeup of the village was 87.7% White, 1.5% Native American, 0.5% from some other race, and 10.3% from two or more races. Hispanic or Latino people of any race were 7.2% of the population.

Of the 82 households, 36 were married-couple households, 5 were cohabiting-couple households, 19 had a male householder with no spouse or partner present, and 22 had a female householder with no spouse or partner present. Thirty households (36.6%) consisted of one person living alone, and 28 households (34.1%) included someone 65 years of age or older. The average household size was 2.38.

Persons under the age of 18 made up 27.2% of the population, and those 65 years of age or older made up 13.8%. The median age was 37.6 years: 30.8 years for males and 42.3 years for females. The village's population was 58.5% male and 41.5% female.

=== 2010 census ===
As of the census of 2010, there were 233 people, 91 households, and 64 families living in the village. The population density was 1,109.5 inhabitants per square mile (428.4/km^{2}). There were 105 housing units at an average density of 500.0 per square mile (193.1/km^{2}). The racial makeup of the village was 96.6% White, 0.4% Native American, 0.4% Asian, 1.3% from other races, and 1.3% from two or more races. Hispanic or Latino of any race were 4.7% of the population.

There were 91 households, of which 34.1% had children under the age of 18 living with them, 57.1% were married couples living together, 4.4% had a female householder with no husband present, 8.8% had a male householder with no wife present, and 29.7% were non-families. 20.9% of all households were made up of individuals, and 7.7% had someone living alone who was 65 years of age or older. The average household size was 2.56 and the average family size was 3.00.

The median age in the village was 36.1 years. 26.6% of residents were under the age of 18; 6.5% were between the ages of 18 and 24; 26.5% were from 25 to 44; 30.1% were from 45 to 64; and 10.3% were 65 years of age or older. The gender makeup of the village was 55.4% male and 44.6% female.

=== 2000 census ===
As of the census of 2000, there were 260 people, 102 households, and 78 families living in the village. The population density was 1,252.8 inhabitants per square mile (483.7/km^{2}). There were 112 housing units at an average density of 539.7 per square mile (208.4/km^{2}). The racial makeup of the village was 97.31% White, 0.38% Native American, 0.77% Asian, and 1.54% from two or more races. Hispanic or Latino of any race were 1.15% of the population.

There were 102 households, out of which 35.3% had children under the age of 18 living with them, 67.6% were married couples living together, 4.9% had a female householder with no husband present, and 23.5% were non-families. 21.6% of all households were made up of individuals, and 11.8% had someone living alone who was 65 years of age or older. The average household size was 2.55 and the average family size was 2.94.

In the village, the population was spread out, with 27.3% under the age of 18, 9.6% from 18 to 24, 32.7% from 25 to 44, 20.8% from 45 to 64, and 9.6% who were 65 years of age or older. The median age was 37 years. For every 100 females, there were 106.3 males. For every 100 females age 18 and over, there were 103.2 males.

As of 2000 the median income for a household in the village was $35,000, and the median income for a family was $39,375. Males had a median income of $32,500 versus $20,000 for females. The per capita income for the village was $14,839. About 7.0% of families and 5.2% of the population were below the poverty line, including 6.6% of those under the age of eighteen and 8.0% of those 65 or over.

== Education ==
Union lies within the boundaries of Nebraska City Public Schools, whose schools are in Nebraska City, in neighboring Otoe County. Union's own school district operated until 1956, when it consolidated with the Nebraska City district.

== Transportation ==
U.S. Route 34 runs east–west through Union and meets U.S. Route 75 just east of the village, where the two routes turn north and run concurrently toward Murray and Plattsmouth.

== Landmarks ==
The Union Jail, a small one-room village lockup at First and Rock streets, was added to the National Register of Historic Places on July 12, 2006. A statewide historic building survey of Cass County described it as "a unique property type now rarely found in Nebraska."

== Notable person ==
- Harry Smith (1889–1964), Major League Baseball pitcher, born in Union
