= Goehner, Nebraska =

Village in Nebraska, United States

- Village
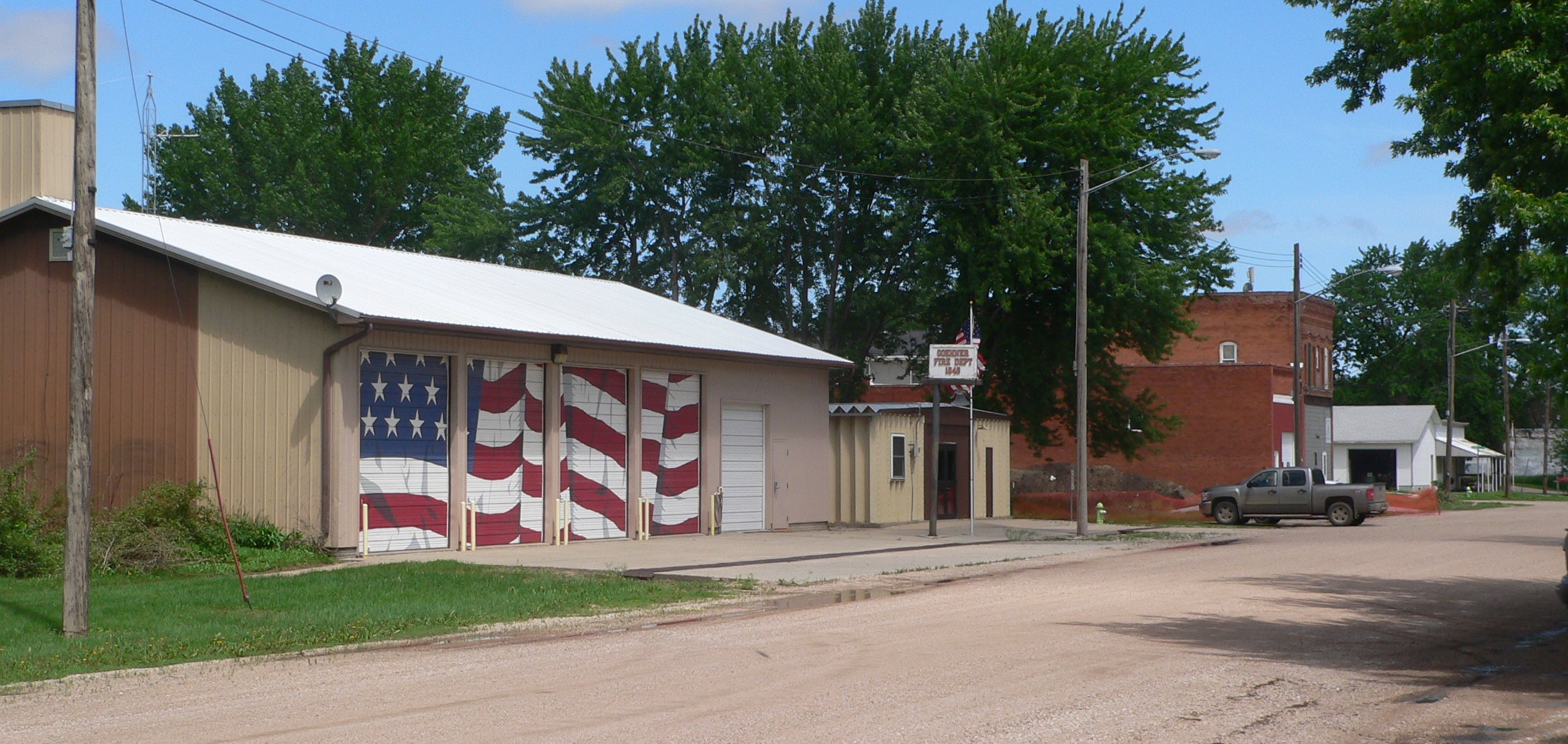
- Downtown Goehner: May Street, May 2013

- Location of Goehner, Nebraska
- Coordinates: 40°49′58″N 97°13′10″W
- Country: United States
- State: Nebraska
- County: Seward

Area
  - Total: 0.17 sq mi (0.45 km^{2})
  - Land: 0.17 sq mi (0.45 km^{2})
  - Water: 0 sq mi (0.00 km^{2})
- Elevation: 1,545 ft (471 m)

Population (2020)
  - Total: 181
  - Density: 1,042.1/sq mi (402.36/km^{2})
- Time zone: UTC-6 (Central (CST))
  - Summer (DST): UTC-5 (CDT)
- ZIP code: 68364
- Area code: 402
- FIPS code: 31-19245
- GNIS feature ID: 2398171
- Website: www.villageofgoehner.com

Goehner is a village in Seward County, Nebraska, United States. It is part of the Lincoln, Nebraska Metropolitan Statistical Area. The population was 181 at the 2020 census.

== History ==
Goehner was platted in 1887 when the North Western Railroad was extended to that point. It was named for John F. Goehner, a local businessman and politician. Goehner was incorporated as a village in 1913.

== Geography ==
According to the United States Census Bureau, the village has a total area of 0.17 square miles (0.44 km^{2}), all land.

== Demographics ==
Historical population
Census	Pop.	Note	%±
1920	150		—
1930	126		−16.0%
1940	125		−0.8%
1950	67		−46.4%
1960	106		58.2%
1970	113		6.6%
1980	165		46.0%
1990	192		16.4%
2000	186		−3.1%
2010	154		−17.2%
2020	181		17.5%
U.S. Decennial Census

=== 2010 census ===
As of the census of 2010, there were 154 people, 68 households, and 41 families residing in the village. The population density was 905.9 inhabitants per square mile (349.8/km^{2}). There were 79 housing units at an average density of 464.7 per square mile (179.4/km^{2}). The racial makeup of the village was 100.0% White. Hispanic or Latino of any race were 5.2% of the population.

There were 68 households, of which 23.5% had children under the age of 18 living with them, 51.5% were married couples living together, 7.4% had a female householder with no husband present, 1.5% had a male householder with no wife present, and 39.7% were non-families. 36.8% of all households were made up of individuals, and 19.1% had someone living alone who was 65 years of age or older. The average household size was 2.26 and the average family size was 3.00.

The median age in the village was 43 years. 21.4% of residents were under the age of 18; 6.5% were between the ages of 18 and 24; 23.3% were from 25 to 44; 29.8% were from 45 to 64; and 18.8% were 65 years of age or older. The gender makeup of the village was 53.2% male and 46.8% female.

=== 2000 census ===
As of the census of 2000, there were 186 people, 75 households, and 48 families residing in the village. The population density was 1,075.2 inhabitants per square mile (415.1/km^{2}). There were 77 housing units at an average density of 445.1 per square mile (171.9/km^{2}). The racial makeup of the village was 99.46% White and 0.54% Asian.

There were 75 households, out of which 24.0% had children under the age of 18 living with them, 61.3% were married couples living together, 1.3% had a female householder with no husband present, and 34.7% were non-families. 29.3% of all households were made up of individuals, and 9.3% had someone living alone who was 65 years of age or older. The average household size was 2.48 and the average family size was 3.56.

In the village, the population was spread out, with 23.7% under the age of 18, 4.8% from 18 to 24, 25.8% from 25 to 44, 27.4% from 45 to 64, and 18.3% who were 65 years of age or older. The median age was 42 years. For every 100 females, there were 124.1 males. For every 100 females age 18 and over, there were 108.8 males.

As of 2000 the median income for a household in the village was $42,143, and the median income for a family was $58,125. Males had a median income of $27,159 versus $30,893 for females. The per capita income for the village was $19,782. None of the families and 1.6% of the population were living below the poverty line.

== See also ==
- List of municipalities in Nebraska
