= U.S. Route 75 in Nebraska =

Section of U.S. Numbered Highway in Nebraska, United States

U.S. Highway 75
- US 75 highlighted in red

Route information
- Maintained by NDOT
- Length: 187.54 mi (301.82 km)
- Existed: 1926–present
- Tourist routes: Lewis & Clark Scenic Byway

Major junctions
- South end: US-75 at the Kansas state line near Salem
- US 73 near Dawson; US 136 in Auburn; US 34 from Union to south of Offutt AFB; US 275 / N-92 in Omaha; I-80 in Omaha; US 6 in Omaha; I-680 in Omaha; US 30 in Blair; US 77 from Winnebago to South Sioux City; I-129 / US 20 in South Sioux City
- North end: I-129 / US 20 / US 75 at the Iowa state line in South Sioux City

Location
- Country: United States
- State: Nebraska
- Counties: Richardson, Nemaha, Otoe, Cass, Sarpy, Douglas, Washington, Burt, Thurston, Dakota

Highway system
- United States Numbered Highway System; List; Special; Divided; Nebraska State Highway System; Interstate; US; State; Link; Spur; State Spurs; Recreation
← N-74	→ I-76

U.S. Route 75 (US 75) is a part of the United States Numbered Highway System that runs for 1,239 miles (1,994 km) from Dallas, Texas to Kittson County, Minnesota where it ends just short of the Canada–United States border. Within the State of Nebraska it is a state highway that enters Nebraska on the Kansas state line about 9 miles (14 km) south of Dawson and travels north across the extreme eastern portion of the state, to the Nebraska–Iowa border in South Sioux City where it crosses the Missouri River along a concurrency with Interstate 129. The northern 210 miles (340 km) of the route generally travels parallel to the Missouri River. The 87.32-mile (140.53 km) section between the I-680 interchange in Omaha and the Interstate 129 interchange is designated the Lewis & Clark Scenic Byway, one of nine scenic byways in the state.

The travel corridor along the Missouri River in Nebraska has always been an important thoroughfare. It was the primary exploration route taken by the Lewis and Clark Expedition as they traveled up the Missouri River in 1804. There are several locations along the US 75 corridor that feature former campsite locations of the expedition. Other cities and towns along the corridor were starting points for travelers and freight headed west on the Oregon Trail. US 75 was one of the original U.S. highways from the initial 1926 plan, however its route has gone through dramatic changes throughout its lifetime. Prior to 1984, the highway left the state in Omaha as it traveled east through the city along the present-day I-480/US 6 corridor across the Missouri River into Iowa. In 1984, with the completion of Interstate 29 in Iowa, a series of transfers between Iowa and Nebraska brought the US 75 designation from the I-29 corridor into Nebraska from Omaha north to replace the routing of US 73 which was truncated back to Dawson at the same time.

== Route description ==
=== Kansas to Nebraska City ===
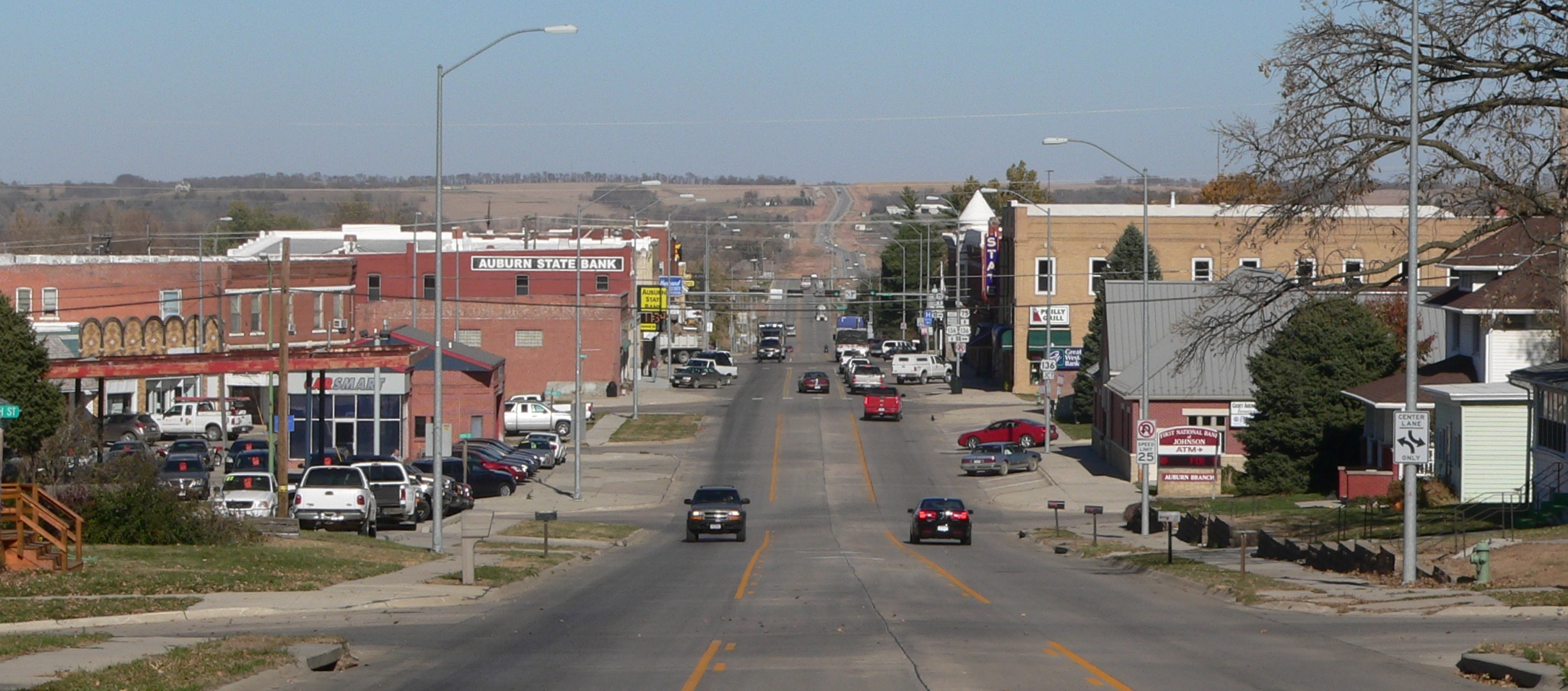
US 75 through downtown Auburn

US 75 enters Nebraska along the Kansas state line south of Dawson in Richardson County. The highway travels north through agricultural fields the comes to an intersection with N-8. After crossing the south and north forks of the Big Nemaha River the highway enters Dawson a small village founded as Noraville in 1872 along the Atchison and Nebraska Railroad. The highway continues north out of Dawson and less than one mile (1.6 km) later has a junction with the northern terminus of U.S. Route 73. The highway then makes a sweeping turn to jog one mile (1.6 km) west before resuming a northerly course as it approaches an intersection with N-4. About four miles (6.4 km) later, the highway comes to a junction with N-62. Continuing due north, US 75 travels 10 miles (16 km) through the rolling hills of eastern Nebraska before entering the city of Auburn. Here, the highway has an intersection with US 136, the Heritage Scenic Byway. The highway continues north out of Auburn and travels five miles (8.0 km) before coming to an intersection with N-67. The two routes run concurrently for one mile (1.6 km) before N-67 diverges to the west towards Brock. US 75 maintains its northerly heading for the next eight miles (13 km) before transitioning to a divided highway at an intersection with N-128. The highway then travels past the Nebraska City Municipal Airport as it heads towards a junction with N-2 on the south side of Nebraska City. Here, a business route of US 75 continues north into the city while mainline US 75 turns westerly and runs concurrently with N-2 along the Julius Sterling Morton Beltway as the highway bypasses the city on the southwest side. West of the city, the two highways diverge as N-2 heads west towards Lincoln and US 75 resumes its northerly trek as a standard two-lane highway.

=== Nebraska City to Bellevue ===
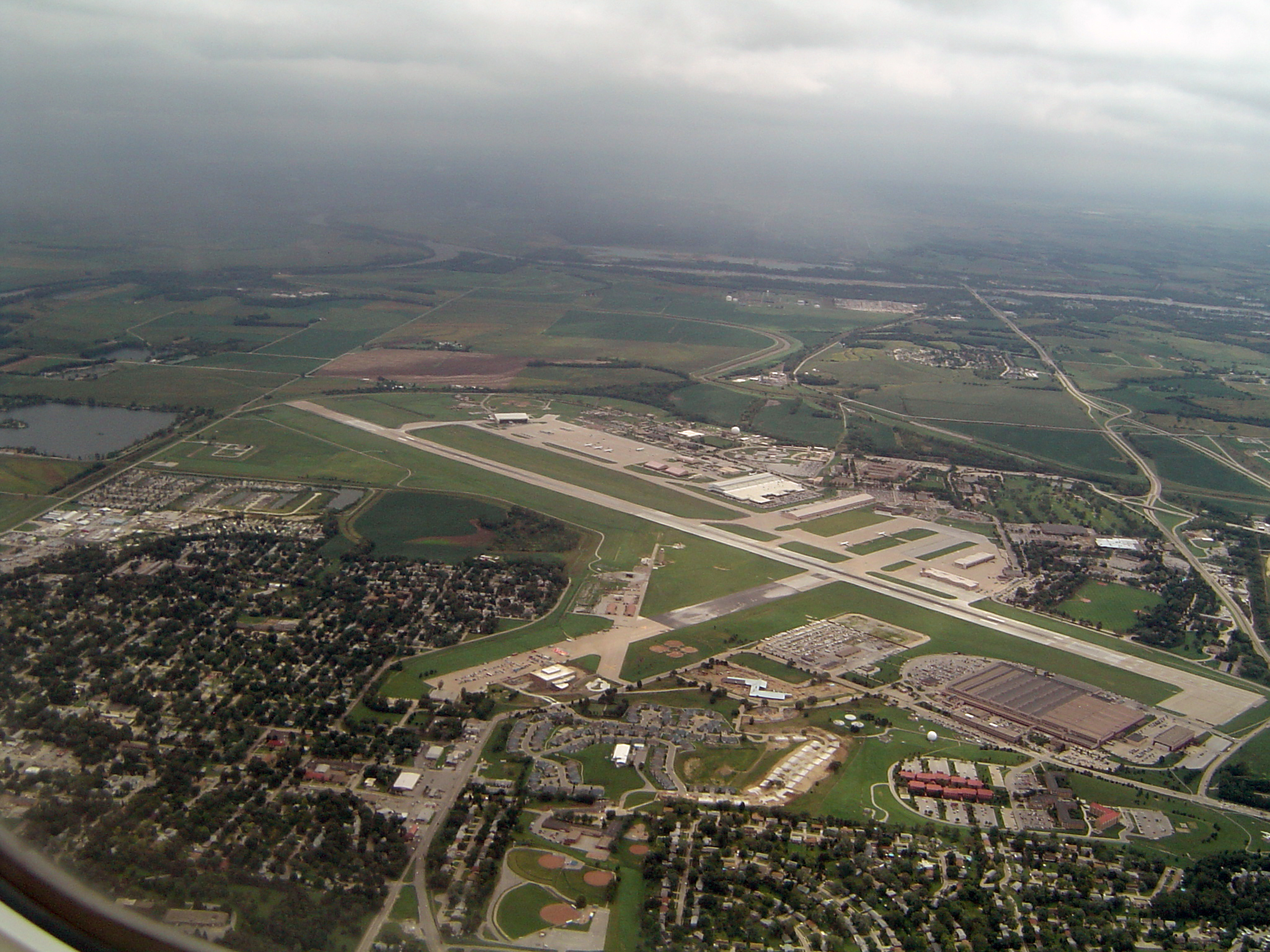
Offutt Air Force Base with US 75 along right edge of photo

After leaving Nebraska City, the highway has a junction with Business Route US 75 northwest of the city along G Road. From this point, continuing north, US 75 generally runs parallel to, and within 10 miles (16 km) of the Missouri River for the duration of length. For the next eight miles (13 km) the highway travels through rural agricultural fields before coming to an intersection with US 34 near Union. Here, US 34 joins up with US 75 and the two highways run concurrently to the north for the next seven miles (11 km) before they come to a junction with N-1 just east of Murray. Continuing north, the concurrent highways travel west of Beaver Lake, then come to a junction with N-66 on the southwest side of Plattsmouth. US 34 formerly turned east into Plattsmouth here to cross the Missouri River into Iowa via a tolled bridge, however a new bridge was opened upstream in October 2014 and US 34 was realigned to utilize the new crossing on the north side of the Platte River near La Platte. As such, US 34 continues concurrent with US 75 along the western side of Plattsmouth, acting as a bypass as the road widens to four lanes. The highway crosses the Platte River then comes to an interchange where US 34 departs to the east along the aforementioned new alignment while US 75 continues north into Bellevue. On the south side of Bellevue, US 75 becomes a limited access freeway known as the Kennedy Freeway. The freeway passes to the west of Offutt Air Force Base just before it comes to an interchange with N-370.

=== Freeway through Omaha ===
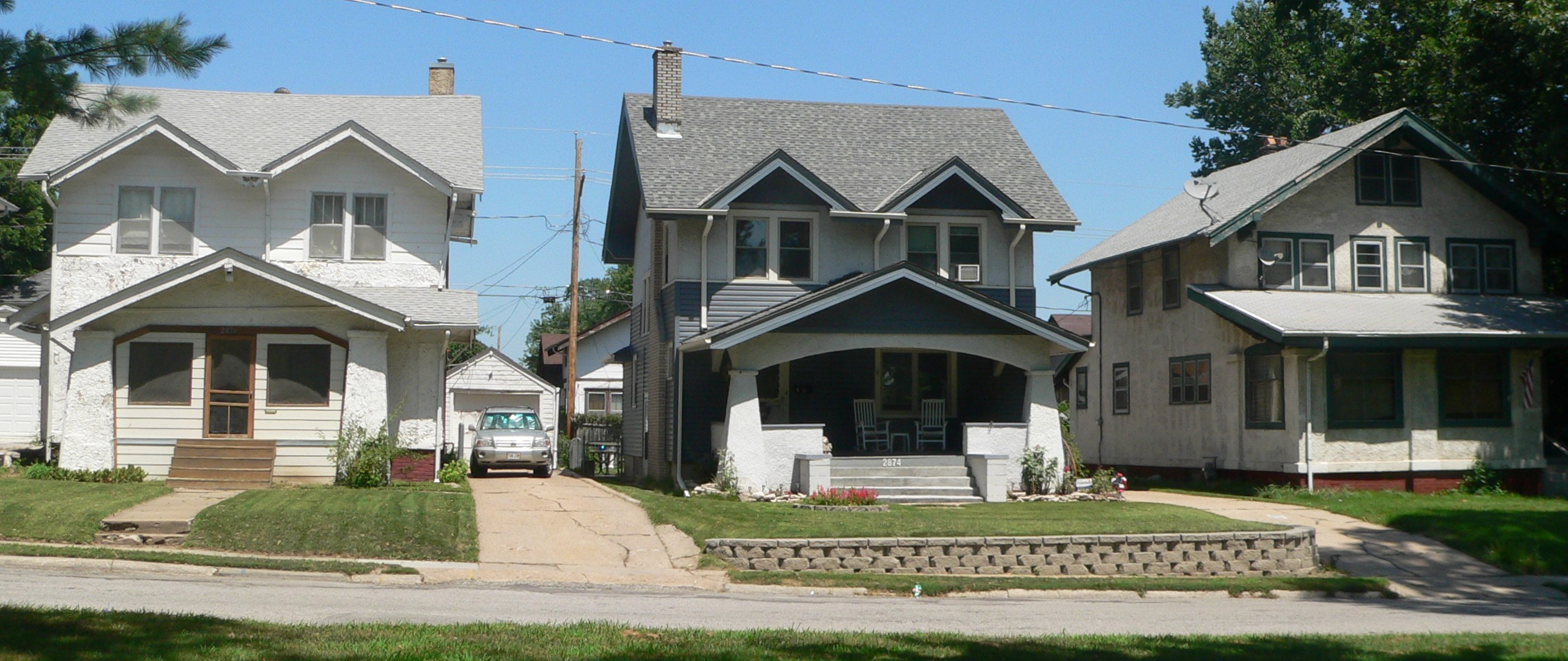
Houses of the Minne Lusa Residential Historic District in Omaha

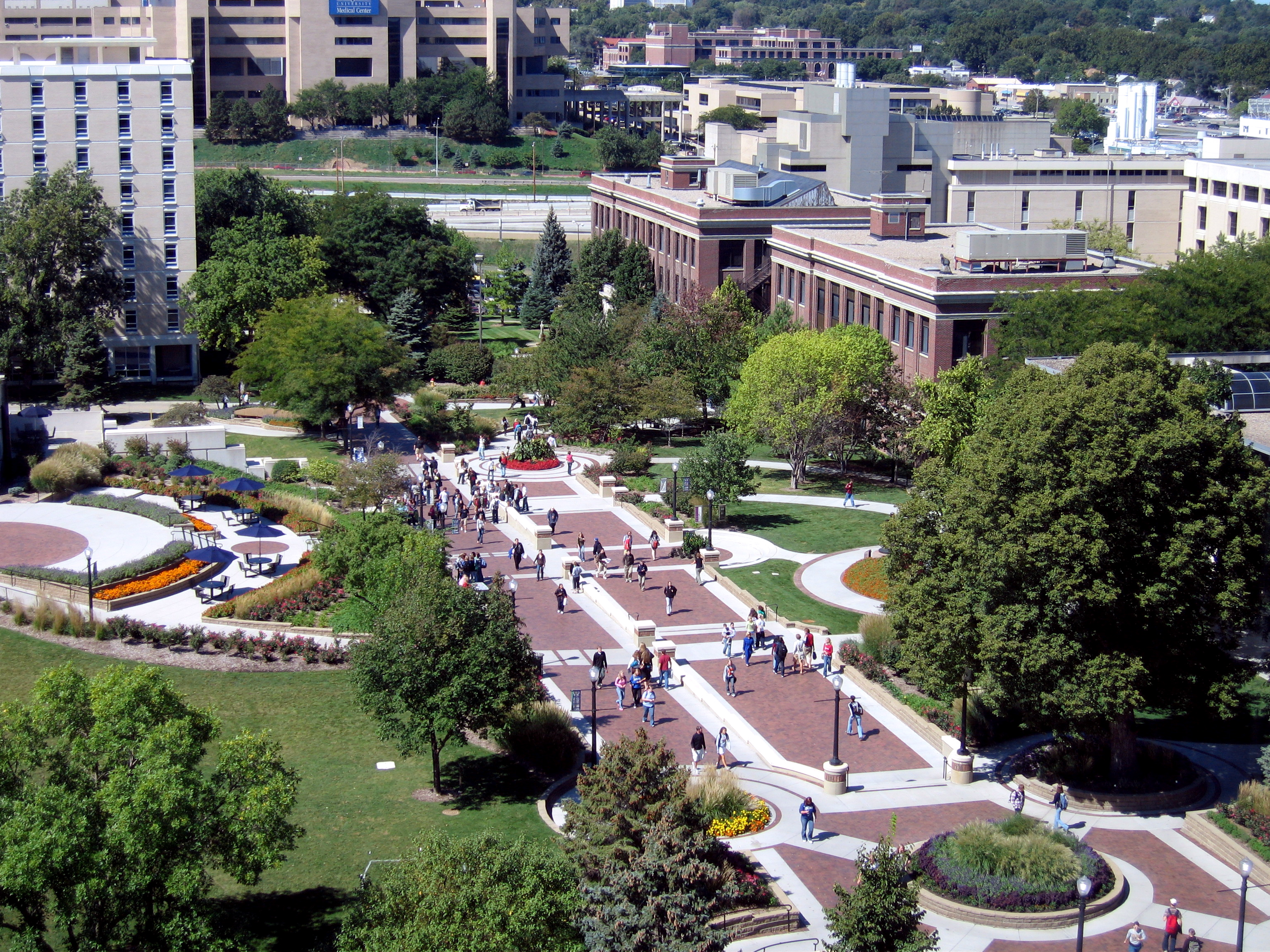
West mall of Creighton University with US 75 in the background

The freeway continues north through dense residential areas as it enters South Omaha. As the highway passes Chandler Road and bends to the northwest it crosses over the railroad before becoming a depressed freeway just before its interchange with Q Street. Shortly after another interchange, this time with US 275 and N-92. Just one mile (1.6 km) later, the highway comes to a complex interchange with I-80 and I-480 near the Hanscom Park area in Midtown Omaha. Here, US 75 joins Interstate 480 where it becomes known as the Gerald Ford Freeway. Together, the two freeways run concurrently past the Gerald R. Ford Birthsite and Gardens, where U.S. President Gerald R. Ford lived for a couple of weeks after his birth in 1913. The freeway continues north towards the newly developed Midtown Crossing at Turner Park. Opened in 2010, it's a seven building, 16-acre (6.5 ha) mixed-use development containing luxury condominiums, apartments, and more than 225,000 square feet (20,900 m^{2}) of dining, entertainment, and shopping. Here, Interstate 480 departs to the east where it heads into Downtown Omaha before crossing the Missouri River into Council Bluffs. US 75 continues as the North Freeway past Creighton University into North Omaha where it has an incomplete interchange with N-64. The freeway then has an interchange with the Sorensen Parkway and the Storz Expressway which heads east to Eppley Airfield. Shortly after, the freeway becomes a surface four-lane street as it travels through the Miller Park area and the Minne Lusa Residential Historic District, a large single-family residential development that was built by a single firm between 1915 and 1941. The highway then continues north through the Florence neighborhood, one of the oldest cities in Nebraska. Shortly after, the highway turns west just prior to I-680 and runs alongside it for about one mile (1.6 km) along McKinley Street before turning north and passing beneath the interstate. Here the highway leaves the city and continues on its path to the north.

=== Lewis and Clark Scenic Byway ===
==== Omaha to Sioux City, Iowa ====
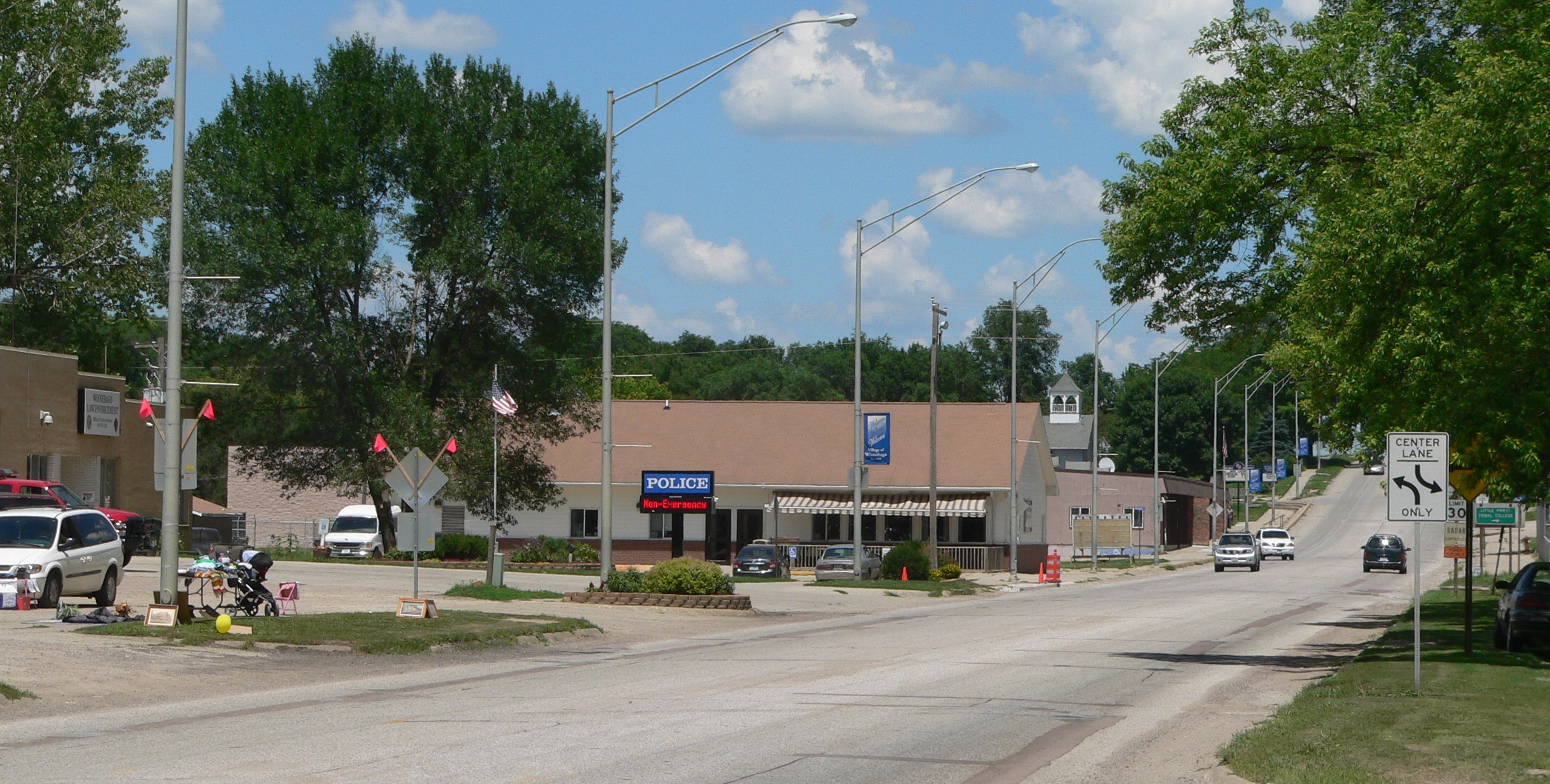
US 75/77 through downtown Winnebago

The portion of US 75 north of Omaha to Interstate 129 is designated as the Lewis and Clark Scenic Byway begins. Throughout the remainder of the highway's length parallel to the Missouri River, the highway passes near the locations of former campsites of the Lewis and Clark Expedition. As US 75 continues north beyond the Omaha City Limits, the highway winds its way through rolling hills before entering the Missouri River plain just south of Fort Calhoun. From here, the highway continues its northward travel along the edge of the river plain towards Blair. Here, in Blair, US 75 comes to a junction with US 30, The Lincoln Highway, and together the two routes run concurrently along Washington Street for one-half mile (800 m) before coming to an intersection with N-91. Here, US 30 diverges to the southwest towards Fremont while US 75 resumes heading north. About nine miles (14 km) later the highway passes through the small village of Herman and six miles (9.7 km) later enters the city of Tekamah where it has an intersection with N-32 just after crossing Tekamah Creek. The highway continues north out of Tekamah, still following the edge of the rolling hills and Missouri River plain passing through rich agricultural fields, for 15 miles (24 km) before coming to an intersection with N-51 on the south edge of Decatur just west of the Onawa Materials Yard and Middle Decatur Bend State Wildlife Areas, both enclaves of Nebraska that are situated on the eastern side of the Missouri River and are only accessible via roads in Iowa. US 75 and N-51 run concurrently through Decatur for one-half mile (800 m) before N-51 departs to the east to cross the Missouri River into Iowa while US 75 continues north out of town. Heading out of Decatur, the highway climbs back into the rolling hills as it turns northwest into the Omaha Reservation towards the tribal seat of Macy. North of Macy, the highway comes to a junction with N-94 and 7.5 miles (12.1 km) later intersects US 77 just south of Winnebago. Here the two highways run concurrently to the north as they emerge from the rolling hills back into the Missouri River plain as they pass through the village of Homer. About six miles (9.7 km) later, the two-lane highway becomes a four-lane divided highway as it approaches Dakota City. On the west side of Dakota City, the highways intersect N-35 before continuing on to the north. two miles (3.2 km) later the highway approaches an interchange with I-129 and US 20 on the southwest side of South Sioux City. Here, US 20 heads west towards O'Neill while US 77 heads north into Sioux City, Iowa. US 75 joins I-129 and US 20 to head east across the southern portion of South Sioux City to the Sergeant Floyd Memorial Bridge which crosses the Missouri River and continues into Iowa.

== History ==
=== Lewis and Clark Expedition ===
Prior to the state highway system, travel across Nebraska was accomplished via foot, horseback, and horse-drawn wagons. Many important historical routes passed through or along the present day US 75 corridor. After the acquisition of vast territory in the Louisiana Purchase, President Thomas Jefferson commissioned an expedition to explore and map the newly acquired territory. A select group of U.S. Army volunteers led by Captain Meriweather Lewis and Second Lieutenant William Clark, The Lewis and Clark Expedition, which began on May 14, 1804 near St. Louis, reached southeastern Nebraska in July of that year. As they traveled northwest along the Missouri River the expedition would set up camp at sites on land in present-day Nebraska at several locations. Many of these campsites are recognized by monuments established by the Nebraska Historical Society along the US 75 corridor near the towns of Rulo, Brownville, Plattsmouth, Omaha, Fort Calhoun, Blair, and Jackson. US 75 parallels the Missouri River for the majority of its length in Nebraska and provides access to many historical sites related to the expedition, as such the highway from Omaha north to Interstate 129 is designated the Lewis and Clark Scenic Byway, one of nine scenic byways in the state of Nebraska.

=== Oregon Trail ===
Discovery of gold in Colorado and Montana promoted Nebraska City to a central hub for freight between 1858 and 1865 as thousands of wagons transported supplies via the Nebraska City Cutoff of the Oregon Trail west to Fort Kearny. As the shortest distance between Fort Kearny and the Missouri River, this plowed furrow extended over 180 miles (290 km) between Nebraska City and Fort Kearny and during the peak of its use in 1865, over 44 million pounds (20 kt) of supplies were shipped before the construction of the Union Pacific Railroad provided a superior means of transportation.

=== United States Numbered Highway System ===
US 75 has existed since the inception of the US Numbered Highway System in 1926. In particular, US 75 originally ran from Galveston, Texas, to the Canadian border near Noyes, Minnesota. Specifically, in Nebraska, the highway followed much of the present day corridor between the Kansas state line and Omaha. In Omaha, US 75 turned east to cross the Missouri River into Iowa where it then turned north to travel on the Iowa side of the river to Sioux City, Iowa. At this same time, US 73 entered Nebraska south of Falls City and ran north through Shubert and Howe before terminating at an intersection with US 75. By 1937, US 73 was realigned to meet US 75 near Dawson. The two highways then ran concurrently north into Omaha where US 75 turned east to cross the Missouri into Iowa. Meanwhile, US 73 continued north to Tekamah where it split into US 73W and US 73E designations. The former traveled west through Craig to Oakland where it met up with US 77 and ran concurrently to south of Winnebago. US 73E ran north through Decatur and Macy meeting up with US 73W and US 77 near Winnebago. Here US 73 and US 77 continued concurrently to South Sioux City. Between 1970 and 1972 the US 73 designation was truncated back to Winnebago removing the concurrency with US 77.

=== US 75 transfer between Iowa and Nebraska ===
The Federal Aid Highway Act of 1956 introduced the Interstate Highway System to the United States and the plan called for a highway along the eastern bank of the Missouri River along and parallel to the existing US 75 corridor. Construction began in the late 1950s near Sioux City and Council Bluffs on what would become the Interstate 29 corridor in Iowa. As portions of the new interstate were completed the US 75 designation was moved off its two-lane highway onto the Interstate. In 1984, proposals to AASHTO by the Nebraska Department of Roads recommended truncating the designation of US 73 on its northern end back to Dawson. At the same time, the Iowa Department of Transportation, jointly with NDOR, suggested removing the US 75 designation from the I-29 corridor in Iowa and assigning it to the former US 73 route north of Dawson in Nebraska. The changes were approved during the May 23, 1984 meeting and the transfer was made official on December 5, 1984.

=== Interstate 580 ===
Interstate 580
- Location: Omaha, Nebraska
- Length: 1.9 mi (3.1 km)
- Existed: 1976–1982

The limited access portion of US 75 north of Interstate 480 is currently known as the North Freeway. In 1976, the Department of Roads applied to the American Association of State Highway and Transportation Officials to assign this route as Interstate 580. This designation was approved during the July 13, 1976 annual meeting. The official state highway maps from 1980 and 1981–1982 and official state traffic flow maps from 1977 and 1979 also show the Interstate 580 designation along the North Freeway, but it was not present in highway maps after 1982 or traffic flow maps after 1979. Originally, the route was planned to extend north and terminate with Florence Boulevard. Plans from the 1960s extended the highway north through Florence to I-680. The I-580 designation was dropped when the state refused to upgrade the I-480/580 interchange to interstate standards. Part of the original plans to extend the freeway to Florence Boulevard came to fruition when the Storz Expressway met Florence Boulevard at a partial interchange before continuing on to Eppley Airfield.

== Major intersections ==
County	Location	mi	km	Exit	Destinations	Notes
Richardson	Nemaha Precinct	0.00	0.00		US-75 south – Topeka	Continuation into Kansas
Richardson	Nemaha Precinct	4.47	7.19		N-8 – Falls City, DuBois, Pawnee City	
Richardson	Grant Precinct	10.55	16.98		US 73 south (Lewis and Clark Trail south) – Verdon, Falls City	Southern end of LCT overlap; northern terminus of US 73
Richardson	Grant Precinct–Porter Precinct line	12.71	20.45		N-4 west – Humboldt	Eastern terminus of N-4
Richardson	Porter Precinct	16.71	26.89		N-62 east – Stella, Shubert	Western terminus of N-62
Nemaha	Auburn	27.78	44.71		US 136 (Central Avenue) – Tecumseh, Brownville	
Nemaha	Glen Rock Precinct	32.79	52.77		N-67 south – Peru	Southern end of N-67 overlap
Nemaha	Glen Rock Precinct	33.79	54.38		N-67 north – Brock	Northern end of N-67 overlap
Nemaha	Julian	37.20	59.87		S-64A west (Main Street) – Julian	Eastern terminus of S-64A
Otoe	Otoe Precinct	42.23	67.96		N-128 west (N Road) – Lorton	Eastern terminus of N-128
Otoe	Nebraska City	46.20	74.35		11th Street (US 75 Bus. north) – Nebraska City N-2 east – Iowa	Interchange; southern end of N-2 overlap; 11th St. serves CHI Health St. Mary's Hospital
Otoe	Four Mile–Belmont precinct line	47.90– 48.88	77.09– 78.66		N-2 west – Lincoln 4th Corso (N-2 Bus. east) – Nebraska City	Interchange; northern end of N-2 overlap
Otoe	Belmont–Wyoming precinct line	50.63	81.48		US 75 Bus. south (G Road) – Nebraska City	
Cass	Union	58.87	94.74		US 34 west (66th Street) – Union, Lincoln	Southern end of US 34 overlap
Cass	Murray	65.91	106.07		N-1 west – Murray	Eastern terminus of N-1
Cass	Plattsmouth	71.94	115.78		N-66 west – Louisville	Eastern terminus of N-66
Cass	Plattsmouth Precinct	74.96	120.64	—	Webster Boulevard / Bay Road – Plattsmouth	Southern end of Kennedy Freeway
Platte River		76.11	122.49	Bridge		
Sarpy	Bellevue	77.83	125.26	—	US 34 east – Glenwood IA	Northern end of US 34 overlap; future eastern terminus of South Sarpy Expressway
Sarpy	Bellevue	78.47– 79.63	126.29– 128.15	—	Fairview Road	
Sarpy	Bellevue	80.19	129.05	—	Capehart Road – Offutt Air Force Base	
Sarpy	Bellevue	81.74	131.55	—	N-370 west – Papillion, Bellevue	
Sarpy	Bellevue	83.05	133.66	—	Cornhusker Road	
Sarpy	Bellevue	84.77	136.42	—	Chandler Road / Fort Crook Road	
Douglas	Omaha	86.44	139.11	—	Q Street	
Douglas	Omaha	86.92	139.88	—	US 275 / N-92 (L Street)	
Douglas	Omaha	87.48	140.79	—	F Street	No southbound exit
Douglas	Omaha	87.96– 87.99	141.56– 141.61	Northern end of Kennedy Freeway		
Douglas	Omaha	87.96– 87.99	141.56– 141.61	452C	I-480 begins (Gerald R. Ford Expressway begins) / I-80 – Downtown Omaha, Eppley Airfield, Council Bluffs, Des Moines, Lincoln	Southern end of I-480 overlap; counterclockwise terminus of I-480; exit 452C is for I-80 westbound; exit not numbered northbound; exit number based on I-80 mileage; I-80 exit 452
Douglas	Omaha	88.88	143.04	1A	Martha Street	Former N-38; exit numbers follow I-480
Douglas	Omaha	89.80	144.52	1B	Leavenworth Street	Northbound exit and southbound entrance
Douglas	Omaha	89.86	144.62	2A	To US 6 (Dodge Street) / Harney Street	No southbound exit
Douglas	Omaha	90.20	145.16	—	I-480 east (Gerald R. Ford Expressway) – Downtown Omaha	Northern end of I-480 overlap; exit 2C on I-480; southbound exit includes direct exit ramp to 24th Street
Douglas	Omaha	90.20	145.16	Southern end of North Freeway		
Douglas	Omaha	90.23– 90.30	145.21– 145.32	2B	30th Street / Dodge Street	No northbound exit
Douglas	Omaha	90.84	146.19	—	N-64 west (Cuming Street) – Creighton University	Northbound exit and southbound entrance; eastern terminus of N-64
Douglas	Omaha	91.15	146.69	—	Hamilton Street	
Douglas	Omaha	91.82	147.77	—	Lake Street	
Douglas	Omaha	93.07	149.78	—	Ames Avenue	Northbound exit and southbound entrance
Douglas	Omaha	93.33	150.20	—	Storz Expressway to Florence Boulevard – Eppley Airfield	Northbound exit and southbound entrance
Douglas	Omaha	93.48	150.44		Sorenson Parkway / Storz Expressway to Eppley Airfield	At-grade intersection; northern end of North Freeway
Douglas	Omaha	96.22	154.85		L-28H north (31st Street) to I-680	L-28H unsigned; southern terminus of L-28H
Douglas	Omaha	97.19	156.41		N-36 west (McKinley Street west)	Eastern terminus of N-36
Douglas	Omaha	97.40– 97.42	156.75– 156.78		I-680	I-680 exit 12
Washington	Blair	114.75	184.67		US 30 east (Washington Street)	Southern end of US 30 overlap
Washington	Blair	115.26	185.49		US 30 west (19th Street) / N-91 west (Washington Street)	Northern end of US 30 overlap; eastern terminus of N-91
Burt	Tekamah	132.61	213.42		N-32 west (L Street) – Oakland	Eastern terminus of N-32
Burt	Decatur	148.46	238.92		N-51 west – Bancroft	Southern end of N-51 overlap
Burt	Decatur	148.96	239.73		N-51 east (7th Street) to I-29	Northern end of N-51 overlap
Thurston	Blackbird Township	161.23	259.47		N-94 west – Pender	Eastern terminus of N-94
Thurston	Winnebago	168.77	271.61		US 77 south – Fremont	Southern end of US 77 overlap
Dakota	Dakota City	182.39	293.53		N-35 west – Hubbard, Wayne, Norfolk	Eastern terminus of N-35
Dakota	Covington Precinct	184.73	297.29	1B	I-129 west / US 20 west / Lewis and Clark Trail north US 77 north	Cloverleaf interchange; exit numbers follow I-129; northern end of US 77/LCT overlap, southern end of I-129/US 20 overlap; exit number is for US 77, no exit number northbound; exit 1A on I-129
Dakota	South Sioux City	185.83	299.06	2	US 20 Bus. east – South Sioux City, Dakota City	
Missouri River		187.54	301.82	Sergeant Floyd Memorial Bridge; Nebraska–Iowa line		
Missouri River		187.54	301.82		I-129 east / US 20 east / US 75 north	Continuation into Sioux City, Iowa
1.000 mi = 1.609 km; 1.000 km = 0.621 mi: Concurrency terminus; Incomplete access; Route transition

== Special routes ==
- U.S. Route 75 Business in Nebraska City, Nebraska

== See also ==
- List of U.S. Highways in Nebraska

U.S. Route 75
Previous state: Kansas	Nebraska	Next state: Iowa
