= Waco, Nebraska =

Village in York County, Nebraska, United States

- Village
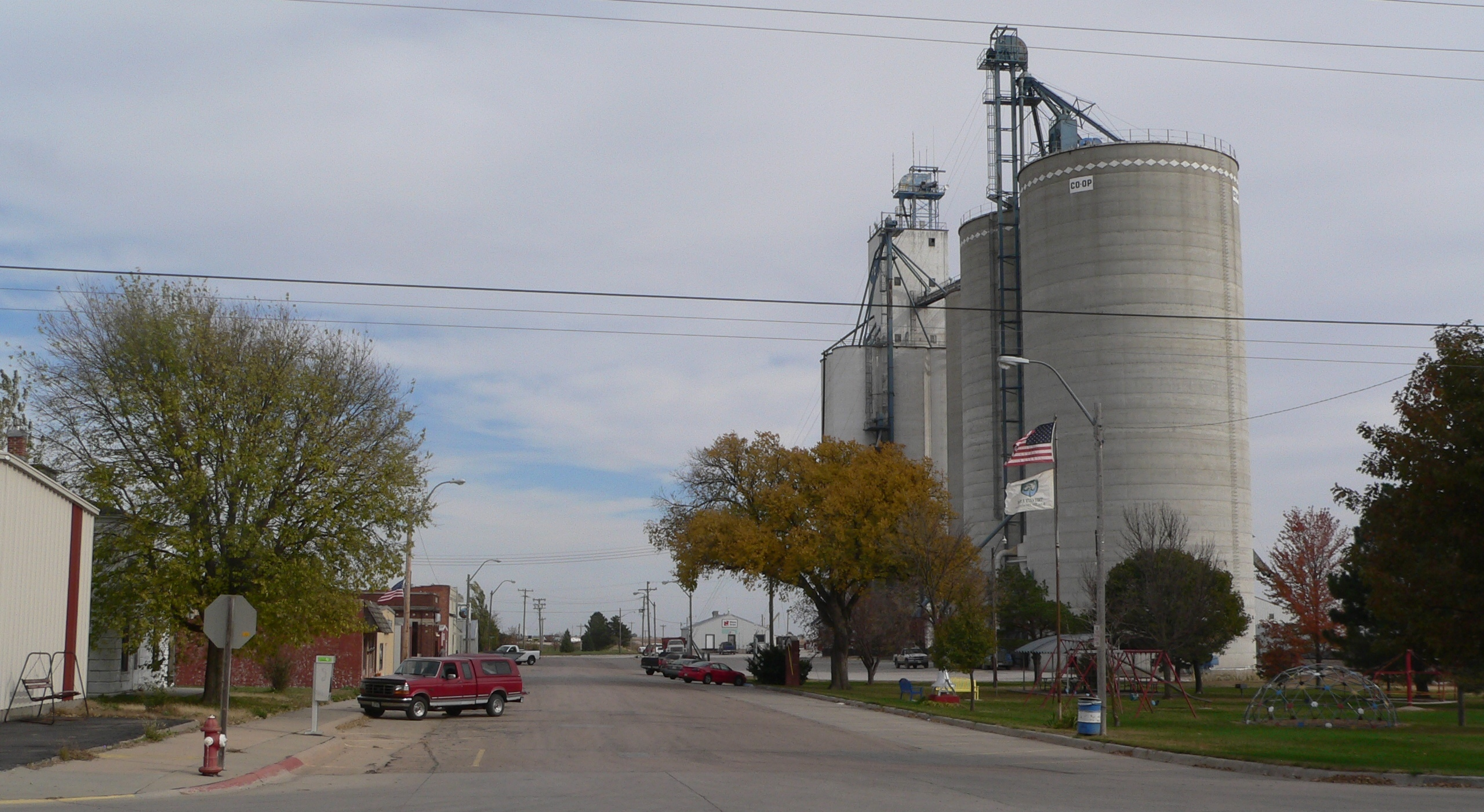
- Downtown Waco, October 2011

- Location of Waco, Nebraska
- Coordinates: 40°53′49″N 97°27′43″W
- Country: United States
- State: Nebraska
- County: York

Area
  - Total: 0.25 sq mi (0.64 km^{2})
  - Land: 0.25 sq mi (0.64 km^{2})
  - Water: 0 sq mi (0.00 km^{2})
- Elevation: 1,621 ft (494 m)

Population (2020)
  - Total: 296
  - Density: 1,197.2/sq mi (462.23/km^{2})
- Time zone: UTC-6 (Central (CST))
  - Summer (DST): UTC-5 (CDT)
- ZIP code: 68460
- Area code: 402
- FIPS code: 31-50895
- GNIS feature ID: 2400078

Waco is a village in York County, Nebraska, United States. As of the 2020 census, Waco had a population of 296.

== History ==
Waco got its start in the year 1877 when the Chicago, Burlington and Quincy Railroad was extended to that point. It was named after Waco, Texas, the hometown of an early settler.

== Geography ==
According to the United States Census Bureau, the village has a total area of 0.23 square miles (0.60 km^{2}), all land.

== Demographics ==
Historical population
Census	Pop.	Note	%±
1880	173		—
1890	278		60.7%
1900	310		11.5%
1910	293		−5.5%
1920	297		1.4%
1930	266		−10.4%
1940	203		−23.7%
1950	180		−11.3%
1960	166		−7.8%
1970	214		28.9%
1980	225		5.1%
1990	211		−6.2%
2000	256		21.3%
2010	236		−7.8%
2020	296		25.4%
U.S. Decennial Census

=== 2010 census ===
As of the census of 2010, there were 236 people, 105 households, and 68 families living in the village. The population density was 1,026.1 inhabitants per square mile (396.2/km^{2}). There were 114 housing units at an average density of 495.7 per square mile (191.4/km^{2}). The racial makeup of the village was 97.0% White, 0.4% African American, 1.3% from other races, and 1.3% from two or more races. Hispanic or Latino of any race were 2.5% of the population.

There were 105 households, of which 24.8% had children under the age of 18 living with them, 55.2% were married couples living together, 6.7% had a female householder with no husband present, 2.9% had a male householder with no wife present, and 35.2% were non-families. 33.3% of all households were made up of individuals, and 13.3% had someone living alone who was 65 years of age or older. The average household size was 2.25 and the average family size was 2.82.

The median age in the village was 46.7 years. 20.8% of residents were under the age of 18; 8% were between the ages of 18 and 24; 16.6% were from 25 to 44; 37.2% were from 45 to 64; and 17.4% were 65 years of age or older. The gender makeup of the village was 49.2% male and 50.8% female.

=== 2000 census ===
As of the census of 2000, there were 256 people, 106 households, and 69 families living in the village. The population density was 1,123.0 inhabitants per square mile (433.6/km^{2}). There were 115 housing units at an average density of 504.5 per square mile (194.8/km^{2}). The racial makeup of the village was 98.83% White, 0.39% from other races, and 0.78% from two or more races. Hispanic or Latino of any race were 1.17% of the population.

There were 106 households, out of which 27.4% had children under the age of 18 living with them, 57.5% were married couples living together, 6.6% had a female householder with no husband present, and 34.0% were non-families. 31.1% of all households were made up of individuals, and 11.3% had someone living alone who was 65 years of age or older. The average household size was 2.42 and the average family size was 3.06.

In the village, the population was spread out, with 27.0% under the age of 18, 5.9% from 18 to 24, 29.3% from 25 to 44, 18.8% from 45 to 64, and 19.1% who were 65 years of age or older. The median age was 39 years. For every 100 females, there were 88.2 males. For every 100 females age 18 and over, there were 90.8 males.

As of 2000 the median income for a household in the village was $32,813, and the median income for a family was $42,292. Males had a median income of $28,125 versus $19,167 for females. The per capita income for the village was $18,834. About 3.3% of families and 4.4% of the population were below the poverty line, including 2.6% of those under the age of 18 and 5.7% of those 65 or older.

== Education ==
Nebraska Evangelical Lutheran High School is a Christian high school of the Wisconsin Evangelical Lutheran Synod in Waco.

== See also ==
- List of municipalities in Nebraska
