= List of Interstate Highways in Nebraska =

Interstate Highways of the State Highway System
- Highway markers for Interstate 80 and 680

- Nebraska's Interstate highlighted in red

System information
- Maintained by NDOT
- Length: 482.69 mi (776.81 km)
- Formed: June 29, 1956

Highway names
- Interstates: Interstate X (I-X)

System links
- Nebraska State Highway System; Interstate; US; State; Link; Spur; State Spurs; Recreation

The Interstate Highways in Nebraska are the segments of the national Interstate Highway System that are owned and maintained by the U.S. state of Nebraska, totaling 482 miles (776 km). The longest of these, by far, is Interstate 80 (I-80) at a length just over 455 miles (732 km). After the system was created in 1956, the state department of roads began construction on its Interstates immediately and upon completion of I-80 in 1964 was the first state to complete its mainline Interstate. With the completion of Interstate 129 in 1977, Nebraska completed its contribution to the Interstate Highway System.

== Description ==
The Nebraska Department of Transportation is responsible for the daily maintenance and operations of the State Highway System, which includes the Interstate Highways in Nebraska. These highways are built to Interstate Highway standards: as such, they are all freeways with minimum requirements for full control of access, design speeds and other characteristics. Speed limits along the Interstates within Nebraska range from 60 miles per hour in the Omaha Metro area to 75 miles per hour along the majority of I-80 outside of Lincoln and Omaha.

== Interstate Highways ==
Number	Length (mi)	Length (km)	Southern or western terminus	Northern or eastern terminus	Formed	Removed	Notes
I-76	3.15	5.07	I-76 at the Colorado state line	I-80 in Deuel County	1976	current	
I-80	455.32	732.77	I-80 at Pine Bluffs, Wyo.	I-80 at Omaha	1957	current	
I-80S	3.15	5.07	I-80S at the Colorado state line	I-80 in Deuel County	1969	1976	Became I-76
I-129	3.21	5.17	US 20 / US 75 / US 77 in South Sioux City	I-129 / US 20 / US 75 at Sioux City, Iowa	1976	current	
I-180	3.47	5.58	US 34 in Lincoln	I-80 / US 34 / US 77 in Lincoln	1964	current	
I-280	13.32	21.44	I-80 in Omaha	I-280 at the Iowa state line	1958	1965	Became I-680 because I-280 already existed in Iowa
I-480	4.15	6.68	I-80 / US 75 in Omaha	I-480 / US 6 in Council Bluffs, Iowa	1966	current	
I-580	3.21	5.17	I-480 in Omaha	Lake Street in Omaha	c. 1976	c. 1982	I-580 number removed in early 1980s
I-680	13.32	21.44	I-80 in Omaha	I-680 at the Iowa state line	1966	current	
Former
