= Nebraska Highway 50 =

State highway in Nebraska, U.S.

State Highway 50

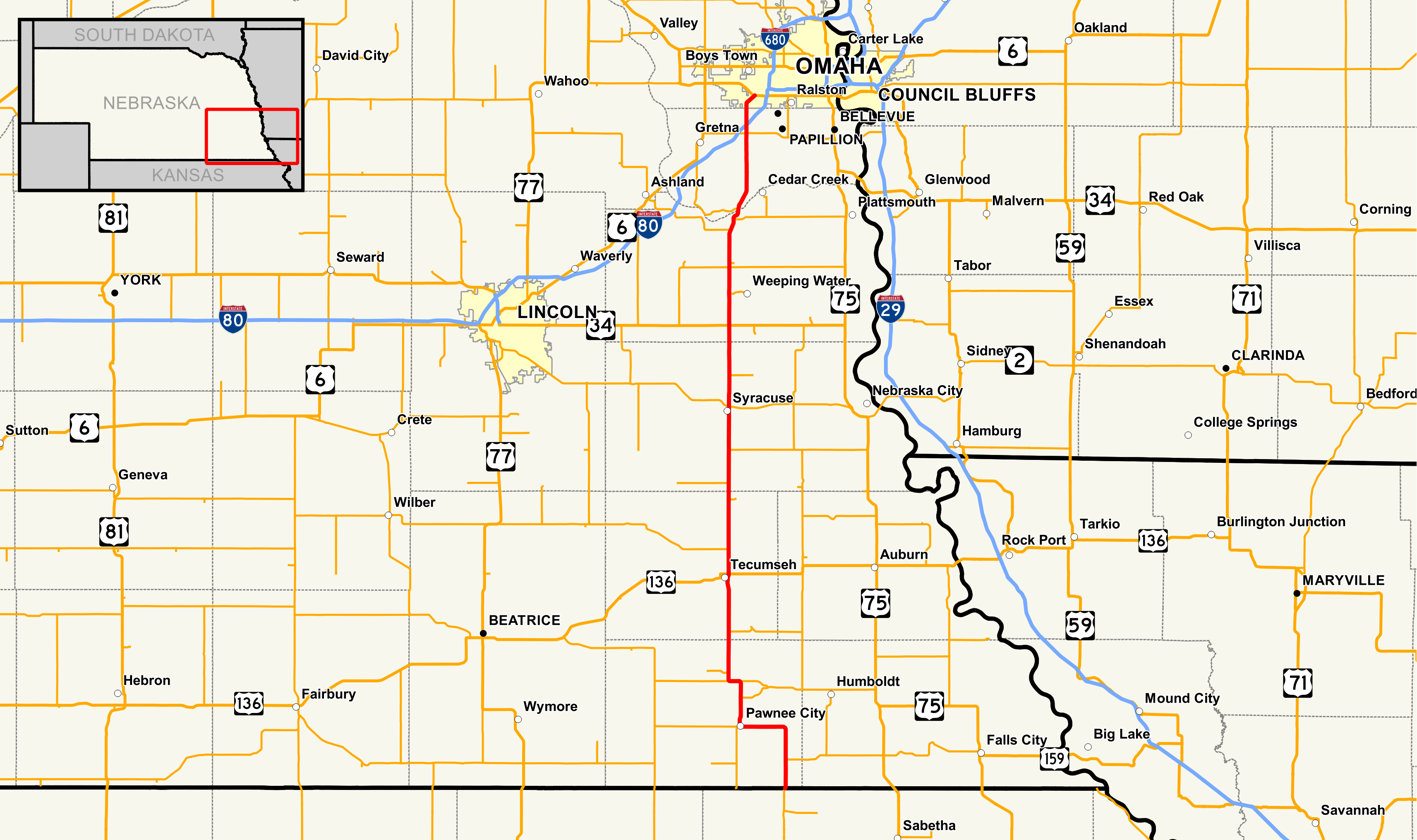
- Nebraska Highway 50 highlighted in red

Route information
- Maintained by NDOT
- Length: 91.45 mi (147.17 km)
- Existed: 1932–present

Major junctions
- South end: K-63 south of Du Bois
- N-4 west of Table Rock; US 136 in Tecumseh; N-2 north of Syracuse; US 34 north of Syracuse; I-80 southwest of Omaha
- North end: US 275 / N-92 in Omaha

Location
- Country: United States
- State: Nebraska
- Counties: Pawnee, Johnson, Otoe, Cass, Sarpy, Douglas

Highway system
- Nebraska State Highway System; Interstate; US; State; Link; Spur; State Spurs; Recreation
← N-47	→ N-51

Nebraska Highway 50 (N-50) is a north–south highway in the state of Nebraska. The southern terminus is at the Nebraska-Kansas border near Du Bois. The northern terminus is in the Millard neighborhood of Omaha at an intersection with U.S. Highway 275 (US 275) and N-92. It is a two lane highway except for the section from Springfield north to the southern edge of the Millard neighborhood in Omaha, which is a divided highway.

== Route description ==
N-50 begins at the Kansas border south of Du Bois. The highway extends into Kansas as K-63. It runs through farmland, passes through Du Bois, and meets N-8. The two highways overlap, first by going north and then by going west, into Pawnee City. In Pawnee City, the overlap with N-8 ends and a new one with N-65 begins. The two highways overlap going north out of Pawnee City and separate near Table Rock, Nebraska. Two miles north, N-50 briefly overlaps N-4 before going north again. Near Elk Creek, N-50 meets N-62. Further north, N-50 passes through Tecumseh and meets U.S. Highway 136. The highway continues due north from Tecumseh through Syracuse, passing by N-41 and N-128 between Tecumseh and Syracuse. In Syracuse, N-50 meets N-2.

N-50 continues due north from Syracuse, meeting US 34 near Avoca. Near Manley, N-50 meets N-1. It continues north and curves northeast before meeting N-66. N-50 and N-66 overlap until the southwestern edge of Louisville, where they separate, though signage on N-50 has "To N-66" signs in the Louisville area, due to a gap in that highway in Louisville. After passing through Louisville, N-50 immediately crosses the Platte River and then immediately meets N-31. N-50 then goes northeast briefly and turns north to go through Springfield, where the highway becomes divided. As the highway approaches Omaha, it meets N-370 and then Interstate 80. It then continues north into the Millard neighborhood of Omaha on 144th Street, then turns northeast onto Millard Avenue. After passing through Millard, N-50 ends by meeting US 275 and N-92.

== Major intersections ==
County	Location	mi	km	Destinations	Notes
40th parallel north		0.000	0.000	K-63 south / 702 Road (240th Road)	Nebraska–Kansas line; highway continues into Kansas as K-63
Pawnee		3.52	5.66	N-8 east – Boy Scout Camp, Falls City	South end of N-8 overlap
Pawnee	Pawnee City	12.98	20.89	N-8 west / N-65 south (7th Street)	North end of N-8 overlap, south end of N-65 overlap
Pawnee		16.50	26.55	N-65 north (713 Road) – Table Rock	North end of N-65 overlap
Pawnee		18.57	29.89	N-4 east – Falls City	South end of N-4 overlap
Pawnee		19.80	31.87	N-4 west – Beatrice, Burchard	North end of N-4 overlap
Pawnee		20.79	33.46	S-67B west – Steinauer	
Johnson		25.81	41.54	N-62 east – Elk Creek	
Johnson	Tecumseh	32.82	52.82	US 136 (1st Street) – Beatrice, Auburn	
Johnson		35.82	57.65	N-41 west – Wilber	
Johnson		41.83	67.32	S-49A east – Cook	
Otoe		43.82	70.52	S-66E west (R Road) – Burr	
Otoe		47.81	76.94	N-128 east (N Road) – Lorton	
Otoe		53.09	85.44	N-2 (Jerome and Betty Warner Expressway) – Lincoln, Nebraska City	Interchange
Otoe		56.82	91.44	S-66C east (E Road) – Otoe	
Cass		62.82	101.10	US 34 (O Street) – Lincoln, Plattsmouth, Union	
Cass		66.80	107.50	S-13K east – Weeping Water	
Cass		69.82	112.36	N-1 – Murdock, Murray, Elwood	
Cass		70.32	113.17	S-13F east (Manley Road) – Manley	
Cass	Louisville	74.29	119.56	N-66 west (Park Highway) – South Bend	South end of N-66 overlap
Cass	Louisville	75.64	121.73	N-66 east (5th Street)	North end of N-66 overlap
Cass		76.51	123.13	Walnut Street to N-66 east – Louisville, Plattsmouth	
Sarpy		77.20	124.24	N-31 north (MoPac Trail) – Schramm Park	
Sarpy				South Sarpy Expressway	Proposed interchange
Sarpy	Papillion	86.48	139.18	N-370 (Strategic Air Command Memorial Highway) – Gretna, Bellevue	Interchange
Sarpy	Gretna	87.48	140.79	I-80 – Omaha, Lincoln	I-80 exit 440
Douglas	Omaha	91.45	147.17	132nd Street / US 275 / N-92 to I-80	Northern terminus
1.000 mi = 1.609 km; 1.000 km = 0.621 mi: Concurrency terminus; Unopened
