= Nebraska Highway 128 =

State highway in Nebraska, U.S.

State Highway 128
- N Road
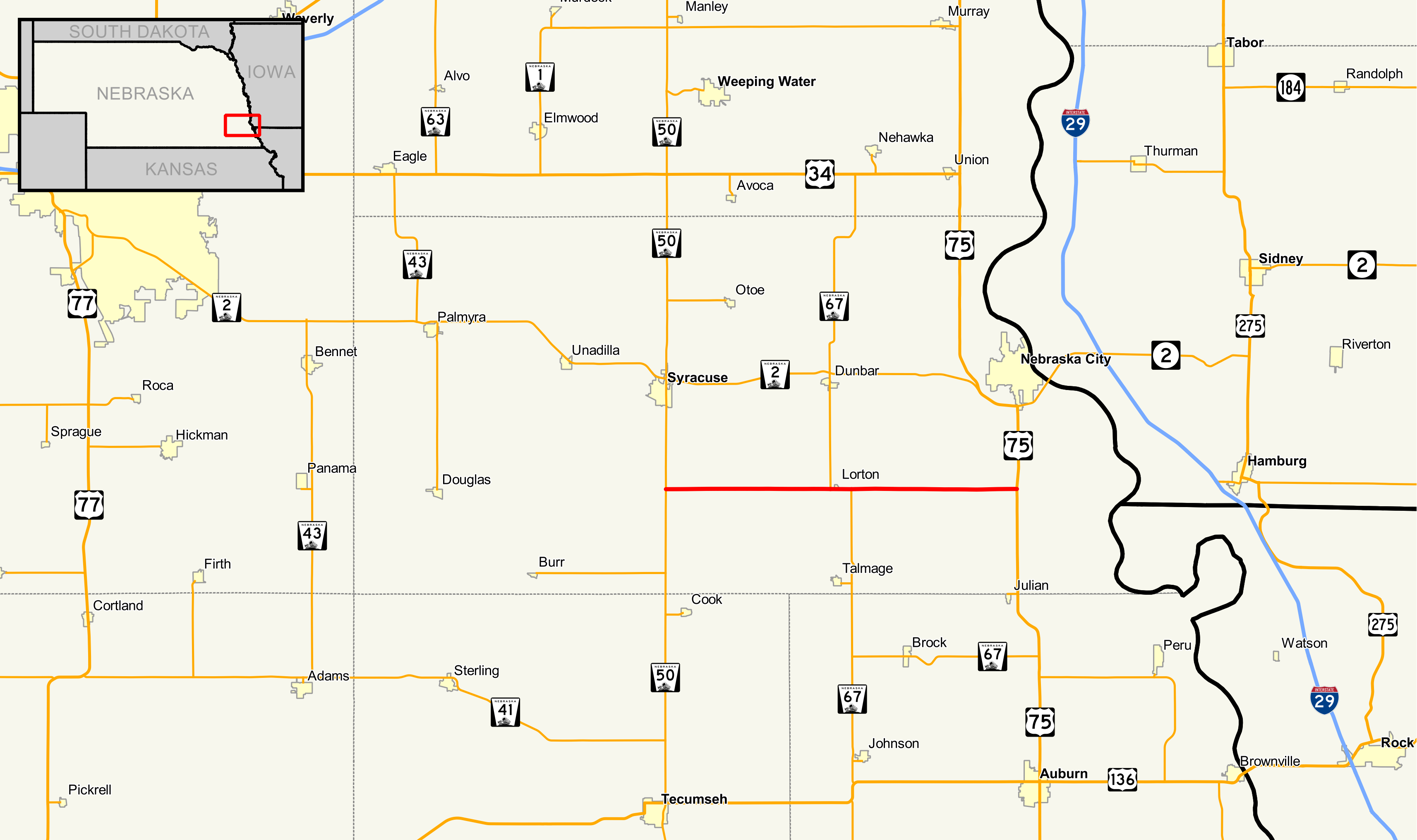
- Nebraska Highway 128 highlighted in red

Route information
- Maintained by NDOT
- Length: 16.84 mi (27.10 km)

Major junctions
- West end: N-50 south of Syracuse
- N-67 through Lorton
- East end: US 75 south of Nebraska City

Location
- Country: United States
- State: Nebraska
- Counties: Otoe

Highway system
- Nebraska State Highway System; Interstate; US; State; Link; Spur; State Spurs; Recreation
← N-121	→ I-129

Nebraska Highway 128 (N-128) is a highway in southeastern Nebraska. It has a western terminus at Nebraska Highway 50 south of Syracuse and an eastern terminus at U.S. Highway 75 south of Nebraska City.

== Route description ==
N-128 begins at an intersection with N-50 south of Syracuse and heads east through farmland. Just west of Lorton, it meets Nebraska Highway 67. They run concurrent through Lorton, and separate east of there. N-128 continues east through the unincorporated community of Paul and ends shortly afterward at US 75.

== Major intersections ==
The entire route is in Otoe County.

Location	mi	km	Destinations	Notes
	0.00	0.00	N-50 (30th Road) – Tecumseh, Syracuse	Western terminus; road continues as N Road
Lorton	7.90	12.71	N-67 north (46th Road) – Dunbar	West end of NE 67 overlap
Lorton	8.89	14.31	N-67 south (48th Road) – Brock, Talmage	East end of NE 67 overlap
	16.84	27.10	US 75 – Nebraska City, Auburn	Eastern terminus; road continues as N Road
1.000 mi = 1.609 km; 1.000 km = 0.621 mi: Concurrency terminus
