= Nemaha Valley Schools =

Nemaha Valley Schools may refer to:

- Nemaha Central USD 115 (Kansas)
- Nemaha Valley Schools (Nebraska)
