= Johnson County, Nebraska =

County in Nebraska, United States

- County
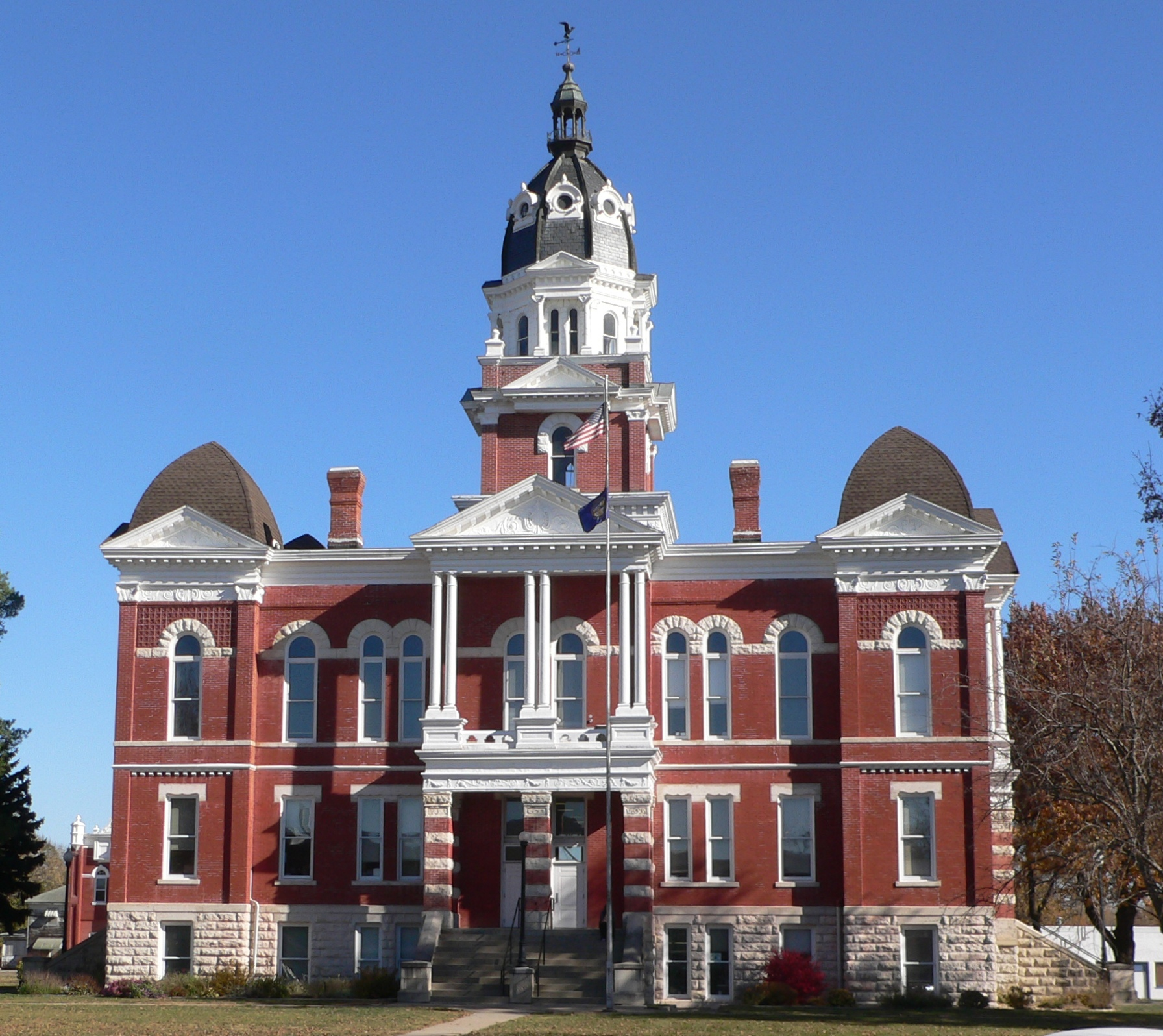
- Johnson County Courthouse in Tecumseh

- Location within the U.S. state of Nebraska
- Coordinates: 40°24′N 96°16′W
- Country: United States
- State: Nebraska
- Founded: 1855 (founded); 1857 (organized)
- Named for: Richard Mentor Johnson
- Seat: Tecumseh
- Largest city: Tecumseh

Area
  - Total: 377 sq mi (980 km^{2})
  - Land: 376 sq mi (970 km^{2})
  - Water: 0.7 sq mi (1.8 km^{2}) 0.2%

Population (2020)
  - Total: 5,290
  - Estimate (2025): 5,218 ▼
  - Density: 14.1/sq mi (5.43/km^{2})
- Time zone: UTC−6 (Central)
  - Summer (DST): UTC−5 (CDT)
- Congressional district: 3rd
- Website: johnsoncounty.ne.gov

Johnson County is a county in the U.S. state of Nebraska. As of the 2020 United States census, the population was 5,290. Its county seat is Tecumseh. The county was formed in 1855, and was organized in 1857. It was named after Richard Mentor Johnson, who was Vice President of the United States from 1837 to 1841. In the Nebraska license plate system, Johnson County is represented by the prefix 57 (it had the fifty-seventh-largest number of vehicles registered in the county when the license plate system was established in 1922).

== Geography ==
The terrain of Johnson County consists of low rolling hills whose flattened tops are mostly used for agriculture. The Big Nemaha River flows southeastward through the central part of the county. The county has a total area of 377 square miles (980 km^{2}), of which 376 square miles (970 km^{2}) is land and 0.7 square miles (1.8 km^{2}) (0.2%) is water. It is the fourth-smallest county in Nebraska by area.

=== Major highways ===
- U.S. Highway 136
- Nebraska Highway 41
- Nebraska Highway 50
- Nebraska Highway 62

=== Adjacent counties ===
- Otoe County - north
- Nemaha County - east
- Pawnee County - south
- Gage County - west
- Lancaster County - northwest

== Demographics ==
Historical population
Census	Pop.	Note	%±
1860	528		—
1870	3,429		549.4%
1880	7,595		121.5%
1890	10,333		36.1%
1900	11,197		8.4%
1910	10,187		−9.0%
1920	8,940		−12.2%
1930	9,157		2.4%
1940	8,662		−5.4%
1950	7,251		−16.3%
1960	6,281		−13.4%
1970	5,743		−8.6%
1980	5,285		−8.0%
1990	4,673		−11.6%
2000	4,488		−4.0%
2010	5,217		16.2%
2020	5,290		1.4%
2025 (est.)	5,218	▼	−1.4%
US Decennial Census; 1790-1960 1900-1990; 1990-2000 2010-2013

=== 2020 census ===
As of the 2020 census, the county had a population of 5,290. The median age was 42.1 years. 18.2% of residents were under the age of 18 and 18.7% of residents were 65 years of age or older. For every 100 females there were 145.9 males, and for every 100 females age 18 and over there were 159.4 males age 18 and over.

The racial makeup of the county was 79.1% White, 6.0% Black or African American, 1.0% American Indian and Alaska Native, 1.4% Asian, 0.0% Native Hawaiian and Pacific Islander, 8.4% from some other race, and 4.1% from two or more races. Hispanic or Latino residents of any race comprised 11.9% of the population.

0.0% of residents lived in urban areas, while 100.0% lived in rural areas.

There were 1,797 households in the county, of which 27.2% had children under the age of 18 living with them and 21.7% had a female householder with no spouse or partner present. About 29.4% of all households were made up of individuals and 14.1% had someone living alone who was 65 years of age or older.

There were 2,093 housing units, of which 14.1% were vacant. Among occupied housing units, 72.6% were owner-occupied and 27.4% were renter-occupied. The homeowner vacancy rate was 3.6% and the rental vacancy rate was 11.4%.

=== 2000 census ===
As of the 2000 United States census, there were 4,488 people, 1,887 households, and 1,254 families in the county. The population density was 12 people per square mile (4.6 people/km^{2}). There were 2,116 housing units at an average density of 6 units per square mile (2.3/km^{2}). The racial makeup of the county was 93.54% White, 0.11% Black or African American, 0.40% Native American, 2.67% Asian, 0.02% Pacific Islander, 1.96% from other races, and 1.29% from two or more races. 2.87% of the population were Hispanic or Latino of any race.

There were 1,887 households, out of which 29.60% had children under the age of 18 living with them, 58.10% were married couples living together, 5.50% had a female householder with no husband present, and 33.50% were non-families. 29.90% of all households were made up of individuals, and 17.70% had someone living alone who was 65 years of age or older. The average household size was 2.35 and the average family size was 2.92.

The county population contained 24.20% under the age of 18, 5.70% from 18 to 24, 24.40% from 25 to 44, 23.60% from 45 to 64, and 22.00% who were 65 years of age or older. The median age was 42 years. For every 100 females there were 91.90 males. For every 100 females age 18 and over, there were 90.80 males.

The median income for a household in the county was $32,460, and the median income for a family was $41,000. Males had a median income of $26,282 versus $20,799 for females. The per capita income for the county was $16,437. About 6.70% of families and 8.90% of the population were below the poverty line, including 10.50% of those under age 18 and 11.10% of those age 65 or over.

== Communities ==
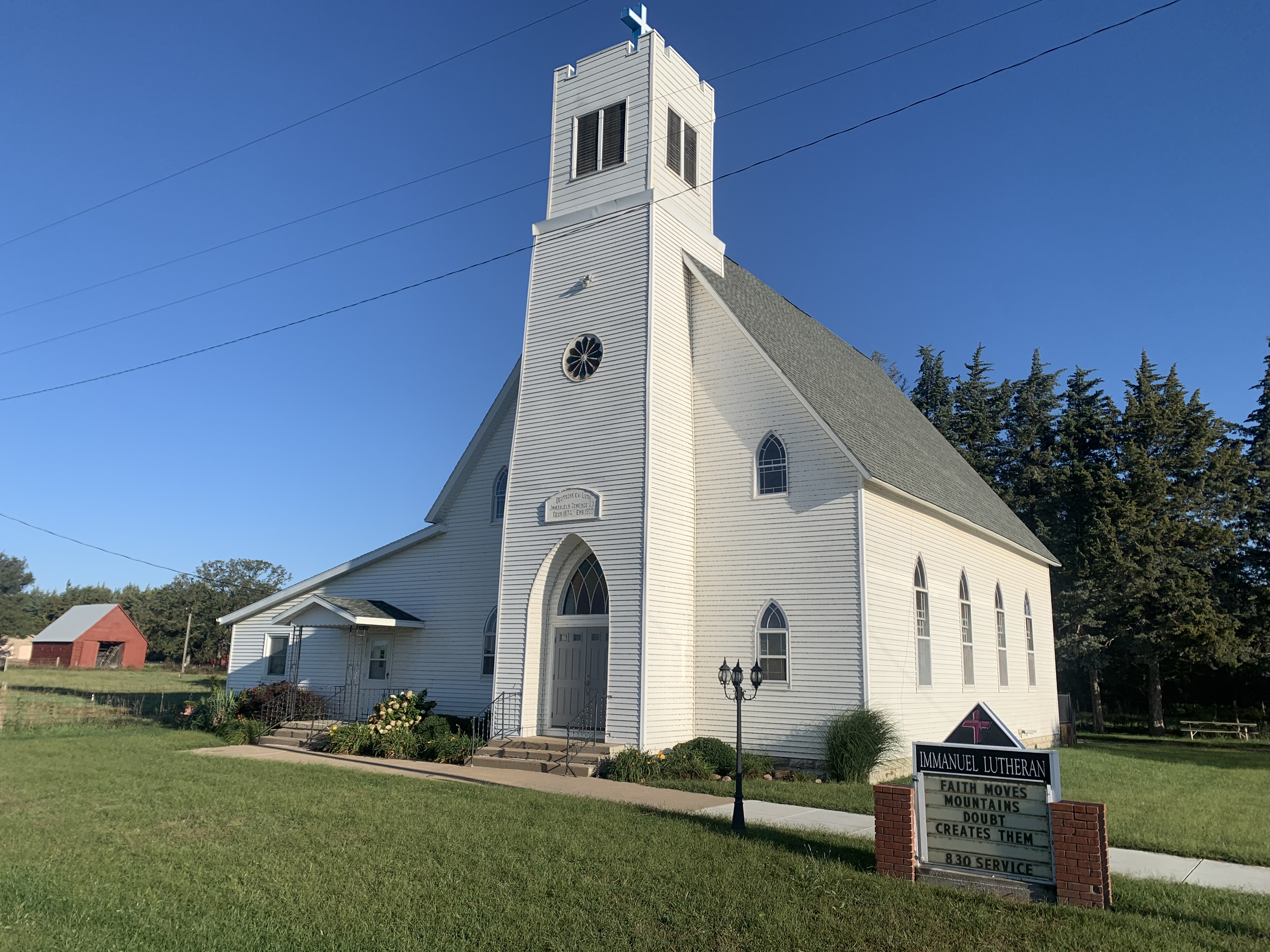
Immanuel Lutheran in Sterling Precinct of Johnson County, Nebraska

=== City ===
- Tecumseh (county seat)

=== Villages ===
- Cook
- Crab Orchard
- Elk Creek
- Sterling

=== Unincorporated communities ===
- Saint Mary
- Vesta

== Politics ==
Johnson County voters have been reliably Republican for decades. In no national election since 1964 has the county selected a Democratic Party candidate (as of 2024).

United States presidential election results for Johnson County, Nebraska
Year	Republican		Democratic		Third party(ies)	
Year	No.	%	No.	%	No.	%
1900	1,532	54.85%	1,179	42.21%	82	2.94%
1904	1,611	63.45%	642	25.29%	286	11.26%
1908	1,357	53.01%	1,150	44.92%	53	2.07%
1912	672	29.77%	890	39.43%	695	30.79%
1916	1,373	54.40%	1,117	44.26%	34	1.35%
1920	2,416	71.29%	909	26.82%	64	1.89%
1924	2,075	54.12%	1,285	33.52%	474	12.36%
1928	2,632	63.67%	1,485	35.92%	17	0.41%
1932	1,644	39.32%	2,505	59.91%	32	0.77%
1936	2,126	46.98%	2,359	52.13%	40	0.88%
1940	2,919	68.26%	1,357	31.74%	0	0.00%
1944	2,649	72.22%	1,019	27.78%	0	0.00%
1948	1,817	58.46%	1,291	41.54%	0	0.00%
1952	2,787	74.02%	978	25.98%	0	0.00%
1956	2,160	65.45%	1,140	34.55%	0	0.00%
1960	2,098	64.57%	1,151	35.43%	0	0.00%
1964	1,312	45.78%	1,554	54.22%	0	0.00%
1968	1,508	60.76%	759	30.58%	215	8.66%
1972	1,637	64.10%	917	35.90%	0	0.00%
1976	1,298	52.87%	1,115	45.42%	42	1.71%
1980	1,719	67.02%	626	24.41%	220	8.58%
1984	1,542	64.36%	821	34.27%	33	1.38%
1988	1,182	50.17%	1,164	49.41%	10	0.42%
1992	885	37.50%	822	34.83%	653	27.67%
1996	1,009	47.98%	770	36.61%	324	15.41%
2000	1,210	57.29%	794	37.59%	108	5.11%
2004	1,470	61.40%	885	36.97%	39	1.63%
2008	1,142	54.12%	914	43.32%	54	2.56%
2012	1,225	59.38%	790	38.29%	48	2.33%
2016	1,355	64.86%	563	26.95%	171	8.19%
2020	1,518	67.98%	647	28.97%	68	3.05%
2024	1,496	69.16%	625	28.90%	42	1.94%

== Education ==
School districts include:

- Freeman Public Schools
- Humboldt Table Rock Steinauer Public Schools
- Johnson-Brock Public Schools
- Johnson County Central Public Schools
- Lewiston Consolidated Schools
- Sterling Public Schools
- Syracuse-Dunbar-Avoca Schools

The Tecumseh Public Schools school district existed until 2007.

== See also ==
- National Register of Historic Places listings in Johnson County, Nebraska
