= Otoe County, Nebraska =

County in Nebraska, United States

- County
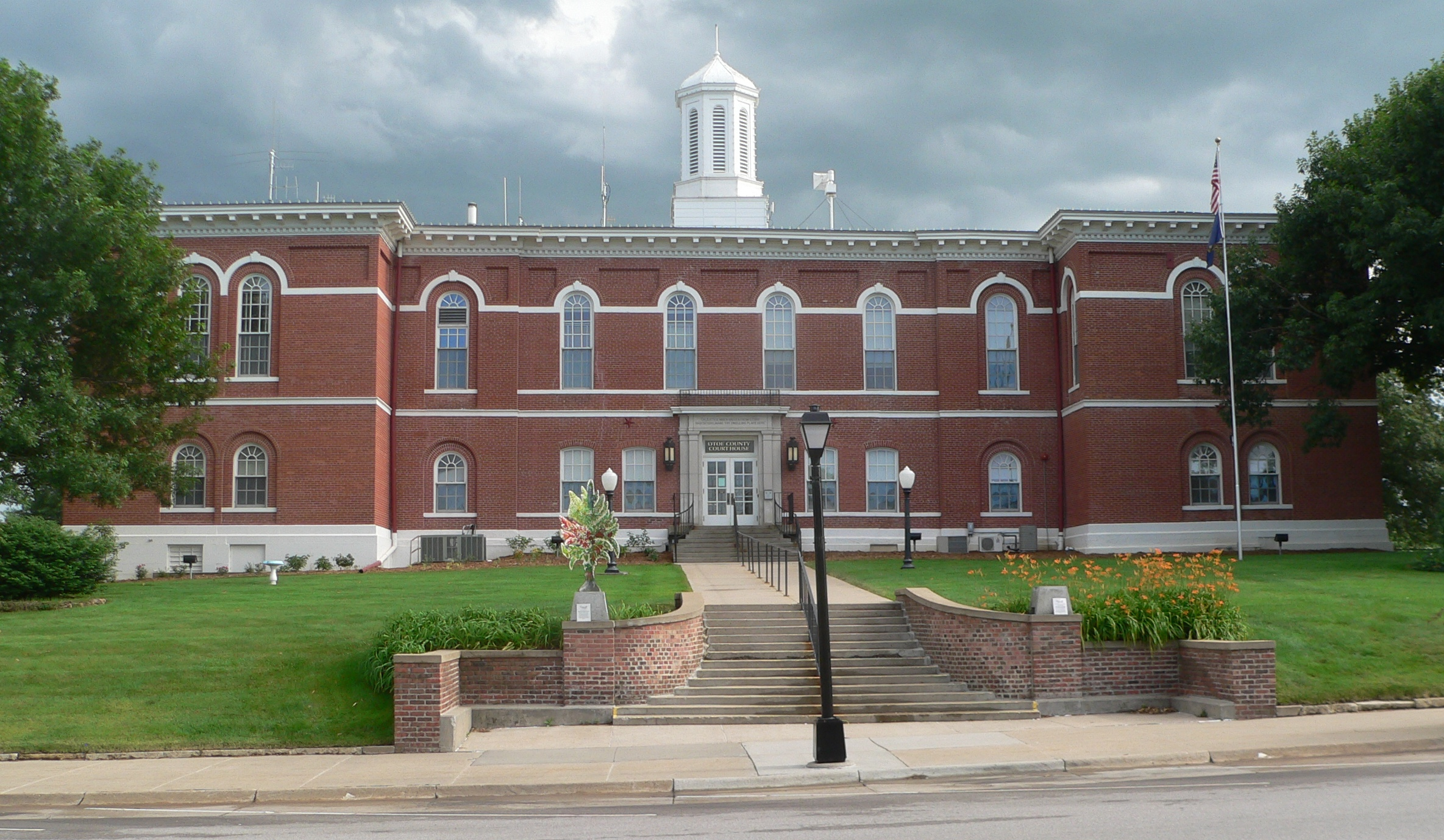
- Otoe County Courthouse in Nebraska City

- Logo

- Location within the U.S. state of Nebraska
- Coordinates: 40°39′N 96°08′W
- Country: United States
- State: Nebraska
- Founded: 1855
- Named for: Otoe tribe
- Seat: Nebraska City
- Largest city: Nebraska City

Area
  - Total: 619 sq mi (1,600 km^{2})
  - Land: 616 sq mi (1,600 km^{2})
  - Water: 3.4 sq mi (8.8 km^{2}) 0.5%

Population (2020)
  - Total: 15,912
  - Estimate (2025): 16,531 ▲
  - Density: 25.8/sq mi (9.97/km^{2})
- Time zone: UTC−6 (Central)
  - Summer (DST): UTC−5 (CDT)
- Congressional district: 3rd
- Website: otoecountyne.gov

Otoe County is a county in the U.S. state of Nebraska. As of the 2020 United States census, the population was 15,912. Its county seat is Nebraska City.

== History ==
Otoe County was formed in 1854 and was named for the Otoe Indian tribe; a variant spelling was Ottoe.

In the Nebraska license plate system, Otoe County is represented by the prefix 11 (it had the 11th-largest number of vehicles registered in the county when the license plate system was established in 1922).

== Geography ==
Otoe County lies on the east side of Nebraska. Its east boundary line abuts the west boundary lines of the states of Iowa and Missouri (across the Missouri River). The terrain of Otoe County consists of rolling hills which drop down to the river basin, and rich soil. The area is largely devoted to agriculture (corn, soybeans, milo, wheat, and fruit orchards). The county has a total area of 619 square miles (1,600 km^{2}), of which 616 square miles (1,600 km^{2}) is land and 3.4 square miles (8.8 km^{2}) (0.5%) is water.

Otoe County derives its name from the Otoe Indians, who lived in the area.

=== Major highways ===
- U.S. Highway 75
- Nebraska Highway 2
- Nebraska Highway 43
- Nebraska Highway 50
- Nebraska Highway 67
- Nebraska Highway 128

=== Adjacent counties ===
- Cass County - north
- Fremont County, Iowa - northeast
- Atchison County, Missouri - east
- Nemaha County - southeast
- Johnson County - south
- Gage County - southwest
- Lancaster County - west

== Demographics ==
Historical population
Census	Pop.	Note	%±
1860	4,211		—
1870	12,345		193.2%
1880	15,727		27.4%
1890	25,403		61.5%
1900	22,288		−12.3%
1910	19,323		−13.3%
1920	19,494		0.9%
1930	19,901		2.1%
1940	18,994		−4.6%
1950	17,056		−10.2%
1960	16,503		−3.2%
1970	15,576		−5.6%
1980	15,183		−2.5%
1990	14,252		−6.1%
2000	15,396		8.0%
2010	15,740		2.2%
2020	15,912		1.1%
2025 (est.)	16,531	▲	3.9%
US Decennial Census; 1790-1960 1900-1990; 1990-2000 2010

=== 2020 census ===
As of the 2020 census, the county had a population of 15,912. The median age was 42.2 years. 24.2% of residents were under the age of 18 and 20.3% of residents were 65 years of age or older. For every 100 females there were 97.9 males, and for every 100 females age 18 and over there were 95.0 males age 18 and over.

The racial makeup of the county was 89.1% White, 0.6% Black or African American, 0.5% American Indian and Alaska Native, 0.6% Asian, 0.0% Native Hawaiian and Pacific Islander, 3.5% from some other race, and 5.8% from two or more races. Hispanic or Latino residents of any race comprised 7.9% of the population.

44.1% of residents lived in urban areas, while 55.9% lived in rural areas.

There were 6,390 households in the county, of which 29.5% had children under the age of 18 living with them and 22.5% had a female householder with no spouse or partner present. About 27.3% of all households were made up of individuals and 12.7% had someone living alone who was 65 years of age or older.

There were 6,941 housing units, of which 7.9% were vacant. Among occupied housing units, 75.0% were owner-occupied and 25.0% were renter-occupied. The homeowner vacancy rate was 1.8% and the rental vacancy rate was 7.5%.

=== 2000 census ===
As of the 2000 United States census there were 15,396 people, 6,060 households, and 4,229 families in the county. The population density was 25 people per square mile (9.7 people/km^{2}). There were 6,567 housing units at an average density of 11 units per square mile (4.2/km^{2}). The racial makeup of the county was 97.42% White, 0.29% Black or African American, 0.22% Native American, 0.25% Asian, 0.03% Pacific Islander, 1.14% from other races, and 0.65% from two or more races. 2.45% of the population were Hispanic or Latino of any race.

There were 6,060 households, out of which 32.50% had children under the age of 18 living with them, 59.70% were married couples living together, 7.20% had a female householder with no husband present, and 30.20% were non-families. 26.40% of all households were made up of individuals, and 14.10% had someone living alone who was 65 years of age or older. The average household size was 2.48 and the average family size was 3.01.

The county population contained 26.30% under the age of 18, 6.40% from 18 to 24, 26.10% from 25 to 44, 22.80% from 45 to 64, and 18.30% who were 65 years of age or older. The median age was 40 years. For every 100 females there were 96.20 males. For every 100 females age 18 and over, there were 91.80 males.

The median income for a household in the county was $37,302, and the median income for a family was $45,295. Males had a median income of $30,682 versus $21,520 for females. The per capita income for the county was $17,752. About 5.90% of families and 8.10% of the population were below the poverty line, including 9.30% of those under age 18 and 7.70% of those age 65 or over.

== Communities ==
=== City ===
- Nebraska City (county seat)
- Syracuse

=== Villages ===
- Burr
- Douglas
- Dunbar
- Lorton
- Otoe
- Palmyra
- Talmage
- Unadilla

=== Census-designated place ===
- Woodland Hills

== Politics ==
Otoe County voters have been very Republican since Nebraska became a state, like most rural Nebraska counties. In no presidential election has the county supported the Democratic nominee since voting in 1932 for Franklin Delano Roosevelt.

United States presidential election results for Otoe County, Nebraska
Year	Republican		Democratic		Third party(ies)	
Year	No.	%	No.	%	No.	%
1900	2,718	52.74%	2,327	45.15%	109	2.11%
1904	2,616	58.85%	1,420	31.95%	409	9.20%
1908	2,243	47.29%	2,411	50.83%	89	1.88%
1912	922	22.82%	1,945	48.14%	1,173	29.03%
1916	2,121	46.45%	2,344	51.34%	101	2.21%
1920	3,869	67.62%	1,671	29.20%	182	3.18%
1924	3,245	50.12%	2,208	34.10%	1,022	15.78%
1928	5,063	62.68%	2,959	36.63%	55	0.68%
1932	3,119	39.19%	4,752	59.71%	88	1.11%
1936	4,399	50.95%	4,173	48.33%	62	0.72%
1940	5,799	66.46%	2,927	33.54%	0	0.00%
1944	5,291	66.51%	2,664	33.49%	0	0.00%
1948	4,060	61.75%	2,515	38.25%	0	0.00%
1952	6,082	75.83%	1,939	24.17%	0	0.00%
1956	5,275	69.67%	2,296	30.33%	0	0.00%
1960	5,057	66.54%	2,543	33.46%	0	0.00%
1964	3,626	53.36%	3,169	46.64%	0	0.00%
1968	3,840	65.96%	1,508	25.90%	474	8.14%
1972	4,815	73.70%	1,718	26.30%	0	0.00%
1976	3,715	59.56%	2,436	39.06%	86	1.38%
1980	4,611	70.30%	1,471	22.43%	477	7.27%
1984	4,679	70.94%	1,869	28.34%	48	0.73%
1988	3,724	58.50%	2,616	41.09%	26	0.41%
1992	2,960	43.29%	2,038	29.80%	1,840	26.91%
1996	3,290	50.58%	2,279	35.03%	936	14.39%
2000	4,178	62.71%	2,208	33.14%	276	4.14%
2004	5,018	67.94%	2,275	30.80%	93	1.26%
2008	4,033	56.87%	2,915	41.10%	144	2.03%
2012	4,258	60.99%	2,561	36.68%	163	2.33%
2016	4,860	65.17%	2,025	27.16%	572	7.67%
2020	5,649	67.61%	2,490	29.80%	216	2.59%
2024	5,651	68.69%	2,463	29.94%	113	1.37%

== Education ==
School districts include:

- Conestoga Public Schools
- Elmwood-Murdock Public Schools
- Freeman Public Schools
- Johnson-Brock Public Schools
- Johnson County Central Public Schools
- Norris School District 160
- Nebraska City Public Schools
- Palmyra District OR-1
- Sterling Public Schools
- Syracuse-Dunbar-Avoca Schools
- Waverly School District 145

Nebraska Center for the Education of Children Who Are Blind or Visually Impaired, a state-operated educational facility, is in the county.

== See also ==
- National Register of Historic Places listings in Otoe County, Nebraska
- Nebraska City News-Press
