= Saint Mary, Nebraska =

- Unincorporated community
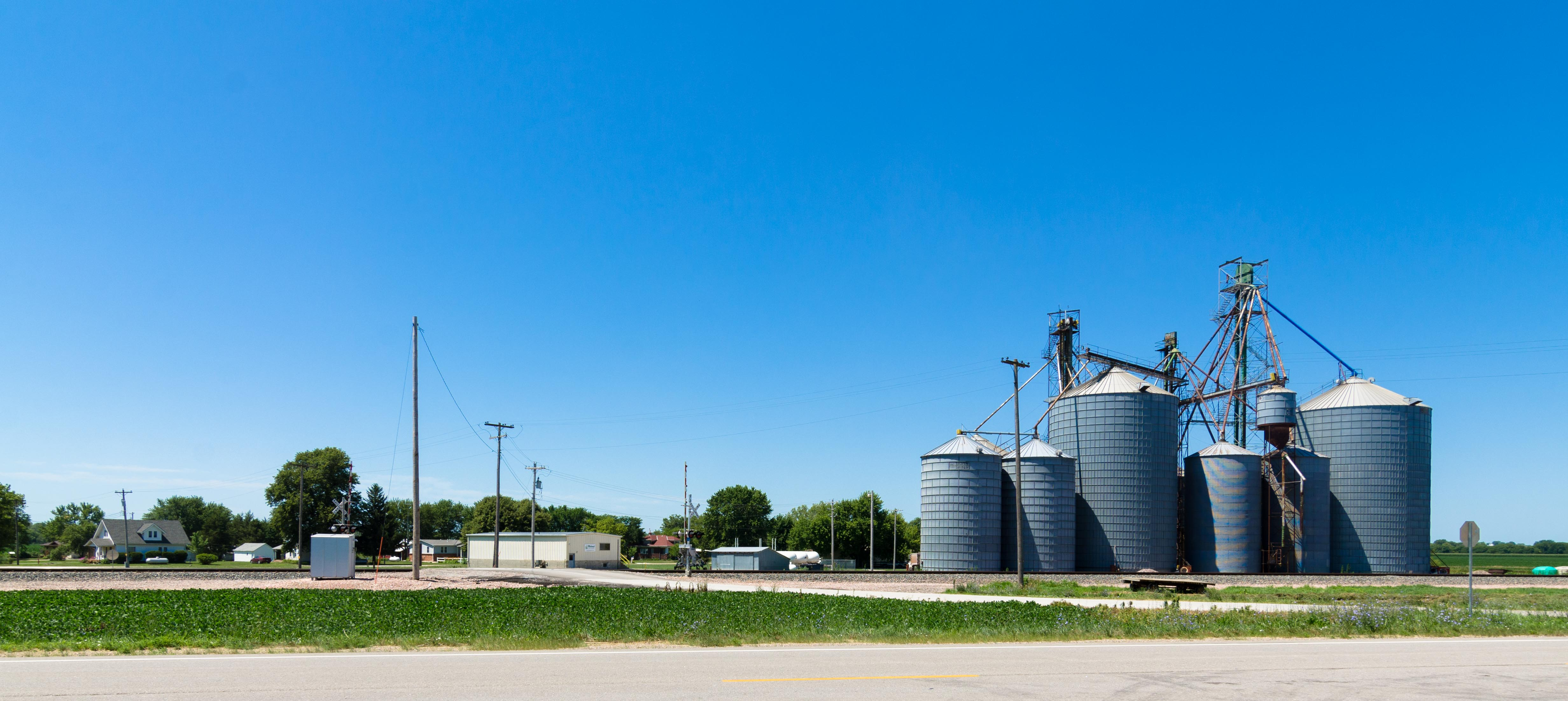
- Grain Bins in Saint Mary

- Location within the state of Nebraska
- Coordinates: 40°25′27″N 96°17′24″W
- Country: United States
- State: Nebraska
- County: Johnson
- Elevation: 1,155 ft (352 m)
- Time zone: UTC-6 (Central (CST))
  - Summer (DST): UTC-5 (CDT)
- ZIP code: 68443
- FIPS code: 31-43195
- GNIS feature ID: 832971

Saint Mary is an unincorporated community in Johnson County, Nebraska, United States.

== History ==
Saint Mary was originally called "Smartville", and later renamed after Saint Mary's Parochial School. The eponymous church it is attached to was founded in 1890 by 20 Polish immigrant families.
