= 1932 United States presidential election in Nebraska =

- November 8, 1932

All 7 Nebraska votes to the Electoral College

Nominee	Franklin D. Roosevelt	Herbert Hoover
Party	Democratic	Republican
Home state	New York	California
Running mate	John Nance Garner	Charles Curtis
Electoral vote	7	0
Popular vote	359,082	201,177
Percentage	62.98%	35.29%
County results
Roosevelt
50–60%
60–70%
70–80%
80–90%
Hoover
50–60%
President before election
Herbert Hoover
Republican
Elected President
Franklin D. Roosevelt
Democratic

The 1932 United States presidential election in Nebraska took place on November 8, 1932, as part of the 1932 United States presidential election. Voters chose seven representatives, or electors, to the Electoral College, who voted for president and vice president.

Nebraska was won by the Democratic nominee, former Governor Franklin D. Roosevelt from New York), running with Speaker John Nance Garner, with 62.98% of the popular vote, against incumbent Republican President Herbert Hoover, running with Vice President Charles Curtis, with 35.29% of the popular vote.

Though he had decisively won Nebraska just 4 years earlier in 1928 by 27%, with the onset of The Great Depression in 1929, by 1932 Hoover had little appeal to the largely rural communities of the Great Plains, as most voters viewed him as not doing enough to lessen the impact of the Depression, with Hoovervilles springing up throughout the country. Additionally, the Dust Bowl, which was a series of droughts and dust storms that hit Nebraska especially hard, decimated the already struggling agriculture-reliant economy of the state.

In contrast, Roosevelt conducted an energetic campaign that appealed to farmers, suburbanites, and urbanites alike. He promised to implement a series of government funded relief programs, collectively known as The New Deal, that would provide economic relief through programs such as the Civilian Conservation Corps, which gave jobs to unemployed Americans by conducting projects such as building national parks and dams. As the Hoover campaign didn't appear to have any substantive policies to ease the economic burden, Nebraskans came out in large numbers to support Roosevelt, winning the state by a decisive 27.1% margin, a complete reversal of 1928, when Hoover won the state by almost the same margin.

Roosevelt carried 91 out of 93 of the state's counties, with Hoover only managing to win Keya Paha and Yankee-settled Lancaster, the former of which was decided by a margin of just 2%, or 32 votes (the latter was decided by a more comfortable 6.5%).

With every county in the state trending Democratic, as of the 2024 presidential election, this election marks the best ever Democratic presidential performance in Nebraska and the only time in history the state has given more than 60% of its vote to a Democrat in a presidential election. 1932 constitutes the last occasion that Antelope, Arthur, Brown, Furnas, Garden, Garfield, Hamilton, Hooker, Loup, McPherson, Otoe, Rock, Valley, or York counties have voted for a Democratic presidential candidate. This was also the last time that Nebraska voted more Democratic than the nation overall.

== Results ==
1932 United States presidential election in Nebraska
Party	Candidate	Votes	%
Democratic	Franklin D. Roosevelt	359,082	62.98%
Republican	Herbert Hoover (inc.)	201,177	35.29%
Socialist	Norman Thomas	9,876	1.73%
Write-in		2 (Note: These write-in votes were not listed by county but as a state-wide total.)	0.00%
Total votes		570,137	100%

=== Results by county ===
County	Franklin Delano Roosevelt Democratic		Herbert Clark Hoover Republican		Norman Mattoon Thomas Socialist		Margin		Total votes cast
County	#	%	#	%	#	%	#	%	Total votes cast
Adams	5,611	56.48%	3,915	39.41%	408	4.11%	1,696	17.07%	9,934
Antelope	4,053	63.17%	2,270	35.38%	93	1.45%	1,783	27.79%	6,416
Arthur	338	56.71%	237	39.77%	21	3.52%	101	16.95%	596
Banner	357	54.84%	285	43.78%	9	1.38%	72	11.06%	651
Blaine	431	62.55%	244	35.41%	14	2.03%	187	27.14%	689
Boone	4,360	69.31%	1,862	29.60%	69	1.10%	2,498	39.71%	6,291
Box Butte	2,688	59.40%	1,772	39.16%	65	1.44%	916	20.24%	4,525
Boyd	2,098	70.95%	808	27.32%	51	1.72%	1,290	43.63%	2,957
Brown	1,565	56.91%	1,174	42.69%	11	0.40%	391	14.22%	2,750
Buffalo	5,872	59.18%	3,773	38.02%	278	2.80%	2,099	21.15%	9,923
Burt	3,734	66.02%	1,857	32.83%	65	1.15%	1,877	33.19%	5,656
Butler	4,456	71.84%	1,712	27.60%	35	0.56%	2,744	44.24%	6,203
Cass	5,155	63.86%	2,756	34.14%	161	1.99%	2,399	29.72%	8,072
Cedar	4,981	73.99%	1,696	25.19%	55	0.82%	3,285	48.80%	6,732
Chase	1,408	57.35%	948	38.62%	99	4.03%	460	18.74%	2,455
Cherry	2,912	61.92%	1,754	37.30%	37	0.79%	1,158	24.62%	4,703
Cheyenne	3,068	68.71%	1,285	28.78%	112	2.51%	1,783	39.93%	4,465
Clay	3,878	60.82%	2,320	36.39%	178	2.79%	1,558	24.44%	6,376
Colfax	4,076	85.29%	648	13.56%	55	1.15%	3,428	71.73%	4,779
Cuming	4,391	77.87%	1,191	21.12%	57	1.01%	3,200	56.75%	5,639
Custer	6,844	61.74%	3,953	35.66%	289	2.61%	2,891	26.08%	11,086
Dakota	3,044	77.32%	863	21.92%	30	0.76%	2,181	55.40%	3,937
Dawes	2,457	52.59%	2,095	44.84%	120	2.57%	362	7.75%	4,672
Dawson	4,513	60.13%	2,859	38.09%	133	1.77%	1,654	22.04%	7,505
Deuel	1,093	61.93%	630	35.69%	42	2.38%	463	26.23%	1,765
Dixon	2,953	63.46%	1,620	34.82%	80	1.72%	1,333	28.65%	4,653
Dodge	7,247	66.76%	3,489	32.14%	119	1.10%	3,758	34.62%	10,855
Douglas	59,347	62.62%	33,938	35.81%	1,483	1.56%	25,409	26.81%	94,768
Dundy	1,344	57.09%	974	41.38%	36	1.53%	370	15.72%	2,354
Fillmore	3,655	62.15%	2,178	37.03%	48	0.82%	1,477	25.11%	5,881
Franklin	2,633	64.36%	1,404	34.32%	54	1.32%	1,229	30.04%	4,091
Frontier	2,188	60.86%	1,353	37.64%	54	1.50%	835	23.23%	3,595
Furnas	3,303	60.31%	2,087	38.10%	87	1.59%	1,216	22.20%	5,477
Gage	7,036	60.73%	4,315	37.25%	234	2.02%	2,721	23.49%	11,585
Garden	1,204	59.90%	768	38.21%	38	1.89%	436	21.69%	2,010
Garfield	775	54.69%	622	43.90%	20	1.41%	153	10.80%	1,417
Gosper	1,263	71.84%	477	27.13%	18	1.02%	786	44.71%	1,758
Grant	395	58.87%	251	37.41%	25	3.73%	144	21.46%	671
Greeley	2,832	75.66%	817	21.83%	94	2.51%	2,015	53.83%	3,743
Hall	6,266	59.72%	3,743	35.67%	483	4.60%	2,523	24.05%	10,492
Hamilton	2,969	58.78%	2,003	39.66%	79	1.56%	966	19.12%	5,051
Harlan	2,486	64.09%	1,272	32.79%	121	3.12%	1,214	31.30%	3,879
Hayes	962	63.79%	506	33.55%	40	2.65%	456	30.24%	1,508
Hitchcock	1,772	59.40%	1,168	39.16%	43	1.44%	604	20.25%	2,983
Holt	4,761	66.13%	2,375	32.99%	64	0.89%	2,386	33.14%	7,200
Hooker	342	66.93%	162	31.70%	7	1.37%	180	35.23%	511
Howard	3,409	79.17%	734	17.05%	163	3.79%	2,675	62.12%	4,306
Jefferson	4,819	65.10%	2,453	33.14%	130	1.76%	2,366	31.96%	7,402
Johnson	2,505	59.91%	1,644	39.32%	32	0.77%	861	20.59%	4,181
Kearney	2,367	66.32%	1,129	31.63%	73	2.05%	1,238	34.69%	3,569
Keith	2,009	67.17%	946	31.63%	36	1.20%	1,063	35.54%	2,991
Keya Paha	645	48.28%	675	50.52%	16	1.20%	-30	-2.25%	1,336
Kimball	1,268	60.09%	793	37.58%	49	2.32%	475	22.51%	2,110
Knox	5,229	73.36%	1,830	25.67%	69	0.97%	3,399	47.69%	7,128
Lancaster	18,190	45.79%	20,772	52.29%	761	1.92%	-2,582	-6.50%	39,723
Lincoln	6,047	64.12%	3,082	32.68%	302	3.20%	2,965	31.44%	9,431
Logan	564	60.84%	346	37.32%	17	1.83%	218	23.52%	927
Loup	389	55.33%	287	40.83%	27	3.84%	102	14.51%	703
Madison	7,366	67.24%	3,489	31.85%	99	0.90%	3,877	35.39%	10,954
McPherson	367	54.86%	291	43.50%	11	1.64%	76	11.36%	669
Merrick	2,881	61.35%	1,698	36.16%	117	2.49%	1,183	25.19%	4,696
Morrill	2,008	57.77%	1,406	40.45%	62	1.78%	602	17.32%	3,476
Nance	2,479	67.71%	1,156	31.58%	26	0.71%	1,323	36.14%	3,661
Nemaha	3,593	62.94%	2,075	36.35%	41	0.72%	1,518	26.59%	5,709
Nuckolls	3,420	64.13%	1,812	33.98%	101	1.89%	1,608	30.15%	5,333
Otoe	4,752	59.71%	3,119	39.19%	88	1.11%	1,633	20.52%	7,959
Pawnee	2,641	62.16%	1,568	36.90%	40	0.94%	1,073	25.25%	4,249
Perkins	1,669	69.60%	674	28.11%	55	2.29%	995	41.49%	2,398
Phelps	2,589	59.22%	1,709	39.09%	74	1.69%	880	20.13%	4,372
Pierce	2,980	71.93%	1,128	27.23%	35	0.84%	1,852	44.70%	4,143
Platte	6,691	77.56%	1,864	21.61%	72	0.83%	4,827	55.95%	8,627
Polk	2,939	63.50%	1,636	35.35%	53	1.15%	1,303	28.15%	4,628
Red Willow	3,479	62.21%	1,972	35.26%	141	2.52%	1,507	26.95%	5,592
Richardson	5,383	65.26%	2,802	33.97%	64	0.78%	2,581	31.29%	8,249
Rock	810	56.06%	613	42.42%	22	1.52%	197	13.63%	1,445
Saline	5,831	73.85%	1,993	25.24%	72	0.91%	3,838	48.61%	7,896
Sarpy	3,112	71.89%	1,148	26.52%	69	1.59%	1,964	45.37%	4,329
Saunders	6,134	67.16%	2,772	30.35%	228	2.50%	3,362	36.81%	9,134
Scotts Bluff	4,792	53.18%	4,108	45.59%	111	1.23%	684	7.59%	9,011
Seward	4,208	64.04%	2,298	34.97%	65	0.99%	1,910	29.07%	6,571
Sheridan	2,945	60.53%	1,820	37.41%	100	2.06%	1,125	23.12%	4,865
Sherman	2,670	72.32%	952	25.79%	70	1.90%	1,718	46.53%	3,692
Sioux	1,006	59.04%	667	39.14%	31	1.82%	339	19.89%	1,704
Stanton	2,302	79.96%	568	19.73%	9	0.31%	1,734	60.23%	2,879
Thayer	3,841	66.12%	1,878	32.33%	90	1.55%	1,963	33.79%	5,809
Thomas	437	60.61%	262	36.34%	22	3.05%	175	24.27%	721
Thurston	3,273	80.70%	739	18.22%	44	1.08%	2,534	62.48%	4,056
Valley	2,400	59.16%	1,584	39.04%	73	1.80%	816	20.11%	4,057
Washington	3,709	71.92%	1,382	26.80%	66	1.28%	2,327	45.12%	5,157
Wayne	2,608	62.78%	1,455	35.03%	91	2.19%	1,153	27.76%	4,154
Webster	2,632	59.97%	1,627	37.07%	130	2.96%	1,005	22.90%	4,389
Wheeler	658	72.63%	219	24.17%	29	3.20%	439	48.45%	906
York	3,920	51.72%	3,573	47.14%	86	1.13%	347	4.58%	7,579
Totals	359,082	62.98%	201,177	35.29%	9,876	1.73%	157,905	27.70%	570,137

==== Counties that flipped from Republican to Democratic ====
- Antelope
- Arthur
- Brown
- Furnas
- Garden
- Garfield
- Hamilton
- Hooker
- Loup
- McPherson
- Otoe
- Rock
- Valley
- York
- Boone
- Adams
- Banner
- Blaine
- Box Butte
- Boyd
- Buffalo
- Burt
- Chase
- Cherry
- Cheyenne
- Clay
- Custer
- Dixon
- Dawes
- Dawson
- Deuel
- Dodge
- Dundy
- Fillmore
- Franklin
- Frontier
- Gage
- Gosper
- Grant
- Hall
- Harlan
- Hayes
- Hitchcock
- Holt
- Kearney
- Keith
- Knox
- Kimball
- Lancaster
- Lincoln
- Logan
- Madison
- Merrick
- Nemaha
- Nance
- Nuckolls
- Greeley
- Jefferson
- Johnson
- Morrill
- Pawnee
- Perkins
- Phelps
- Pierce
- Douglas
- Polk
- Red Willow
- Richardson
- Saunders
- Scotts Bluff
- Seward
- Sheridan
- Sarpy
- Thayer
- Thomas
- Sioux
- Washington
- Wayne
- Webster
- Wheeler

== See also ==
- United States presidential elections in Nebraska
