= 1988 United States presidential election in Nebraska =

- November 8, 1988

Nominee	George H. W. Bush	Michael Dukakis
Party	Republican	Democratic
Home state	Texas	Massachusetts
Running mate	Dan Quayle	Lloyd Bentsen
Electoral vote	5	0
Popular vote	398,447	259,646
Percentage	60.15%	39.20%

Bush
40–50%
50–60%
60–70%
70–80%
80–90%
90–100%
Dukakis
50–60%
60–70%
70–80%
80–90%
90–100%
President before election
Ronald Reagan
Republican
Elected President
George H. W. Bush
Republican

The 1988 United States presidential election in Nebraska took place on November 8, 1988. All 50 states and the District of Columbia, were part of the 1988 United States presidential election. Voters chose five electors to the Electoral College, which selected the president and vice president.

Nebraska was won by incumbent United States Vice President George H. W. Bush of Texas, who was running against Massachusetts Governor Michael Dukakis. Bush ran with Indiana Senator Dan Quayle as Vice President, and Dukakis ran with Texas Senator Lloyd Bentsen. Bush won Nebraska by a powerful 21% margin. His 60.15% vote share made it his seventh-best state in the nation, and one of only seven where he exceeded 60% of the vote. Even in this drought-influenced election, Nebraska remained largely immune to any significant softening of the Republican vote, as occurred in nearby, generally solidly Republican states at the time such as South Dakota, Montana, Colorado, and Kansas.

The election was very partisan, with more than 99 percent of the electorate voting for either the Democratic or Republican parties, and only four candidates appearing on the ballot. As has been typical ever since the 1950s, nearly every county in Nebraska turned out a majority for the Republican Party. Dukakis carried only Saline County (which had long been the most Democratic county in the state), and Dakota County and Thurston County in the northeast with their substantial Hispanic and Native American populations.

Nebraska weighed in for this election as 7% more Republican than the national average. To date, this remains the last time that Nebraska has voted under a winner-take-all system in a presidential election; it would start allocating its electoral votes by congressional district in 1992.

== Results ==
1988 United States presidential election in Nebraska
Party	Candidate	Votes	Percentage	Electoral votes
Republican	George H. W. Bush	398,447	60.15%	5
Democratic	Michael Dukakis	259,646	39.20%	0
Libertarian	Ron Paul	2,536	0.38%	0
New Alliance Party	Lenora Fulani	1,743	0.26%	0
Totals		662,372	100.0%	5

=== Results by county ===
County	George H.W. Bush Republican		Michael Dukakis Democratic		Ron Paul Libertarian		Leonora Fulani New Alliance		Margin		Total votes cast
County	#	%	#	%	#	%	#	%	#	%	Total votes cast
Adams	8,073	65.59%	4,156	33.77%	49	0.40%	30	0.24%	3,917	31.82%	12,308
Antelope	2,626	73.78%	933	26.22%	0	0.00%	0	0.00%	1,693	47.56%	3,559
Arthur	210	78.07%	58	21.56%	1	0.37%	0	0.00%	152	56.51%	269
Banner	361	75.68%	112	23.48%	2	0.42%	2	0.42%	249	52.20%	477
Blaine	338	82.24%	72	17.52%	1	0.24%	0	0.00%	266	64.72%	411
Boone	2,160	68.57%	976	30.98%	8	0.25%	6	0.19%	1,184	37.59%	3,150
Box Butte	3,253	56.42%	2,468	42.80%	28	0.49%	17	0.29%	785	13.62%	5,766
Boyd	967	65.92%	480	32.72%	16	1.09%	4	0.27%	487	33.20%	1,467
Brown	1,336	74.93%	435	24.40%	9	0.50%	3	0.17%	901	50.53%	1,783
Buffalo	9,981	67.31%	4,702	31.71%	100	0.67%	45	0.30%	5,279	35.60%	14,828
Burt	2,050	58.06%	1,458	41.29%	15	0.42%	8	0.23%	592	16.77%	3,531
Butler	2,086	54.62%	1,715	44.91%	11	0.29%	7	0.18%	371	9.71%	3,819
Cass	4,664	55.61%	3,677	43.84%	24	0.29%	22	0.26%	987	11.77%	8,387
Cedar	2,462	58.09%	1,759	41.51%	13	0.31%	4	0.09%	703	16.58%	4,238
Chase	1,446	69.45%	597	28.67%	31	1.49%	8	0.38%	849	40.78%	2,082
Cherry	2,240	77.35%	642	22.17%	10	0.35%	4	0.14%	1,598	55.18%	2,896
Cheyenne	2,862	67.77%	1,333	31.57%	20	0.47%	8	0.19%	1,529	36.20%	4,223
Clay	2,352	67.78%	1,097	31.61%	15	0.43%	6	0.17%	1,255	36.17%	3,470
Colfax	2,329	59.75%	1,542	39.56%	20	0.51%	7	0.18%	787	20.19%	3,898
Cuming	3,208	71.75%	1,239	27.71%	14	0.31%	10	0.22%	1,969	44.04%	4,471
Custer	4,203	73.40%	1,496	26.13%	7	0.12%	20	0.35%	2,707	47.27%	5,726
Dakota	2,744	48.17%	2,942	51.64%	5	0.09%	6	0.11%	-198	-3.47%	5,697
Dawes	2,621	69.50%	1,123	29.78%	16	0.42%	11	0.29%	1,498	39.72%	3,771
Dawson	5,529	71.30%	2,184	28.16%	22	0.28%	20	0.26%	3,345	43.14%	7,755
Deuel	769	71.20%	302	27.96%	5	0.46%	4	0.37%	467	43.24%	1,080
Dixon	1,802	60.53%	1,166	39.17%	5	0.17%	4	0.13%	636	21.36%	2,977
Dodge	8,417	57.66%	6,116	41.90%	42	0.29%	22	0.15%	2,301	15.76%	14,597
Douglas	99,916	56.27%	76,541	43.11%	562	0.32%	546	0.31%	23,375	13.16%	177,565
Dundy	828	70.29%	333	28.27%	12	1.02%	5	0.42%	495	42.02%	1,178
Fillmore	1,955	57.20%	1,435	41.98%	20	0.59%	8	0.23%	520	15.22%	3,418
Franklin	1,294	62.06%	768	36.83%	15	0.72%	8	0.38%	526	25.23%	2,085
Frontier	1,057	72.45%	384	26.32%	15	1.03%	3	0.21%	673	46.13%	1,459
Furnas	1,830	69.19%	791	29.91%	16	0.60%	8	0.30%	1,039	39.28%	2,645
Gage	5,115	55.68%	4,008	43.63%	44	0.48%	19	0.21%	1,107	12.05%	9,186
Garden	986	72.39%	366	26.87%	5	0.37%	5	0.37%	620	45.52%	1,362
Garfield	803	75.97%	234	22.14%	17	1.61%	3	0.28%	569	53.83%	1,057
Gosper	694	67.12%	331	32.01%	5	0.48%	4	0.39%	363	35.11%	1,034
Grant	301	76.79%	89	22.70%	1	0.26%	1	0.26%	212	54.09%	392
Greeley	763	53.06%	670	46.59%	4	0.28%	1	0.07%	93	6.47%	1,438
Hall	12,062	63.41%	6,853	36.02%	32	0.17%	76	0.40%	5,209	27.39%	19,023
Hamilton	3,022	69.73%	1,289	29.74%	16	0.37%	7	0.16%	1,733	39.99%	4,334
Harlan	1,403	65.13%	725	33.66%	16	0.74%	10	0.46%	678	31.47%	2,154
Hayes	512	75.07%	160	23.46%	6	0.88%	4	0.59%	352	51.61%	682
Hitchcock	1,132	69.45%	480	29.45%	13	0.80%	5	0.31%	652	40.00%	1,630
Holt	4,081	74.66%	1,327	24.28%	43	0.79%	15	0.27%	2,754	50.38%	5,466
Hooker	378	80.25%	91	19.32%	1	0.21%	1	0.21%	287	60.93%	471
Howard	1,526	55.63%	1,186	43.24%	21	0.77%	10	0.36%	340	12.39%	2,743
Jefferson	2,471	57.16%	1,819	42.08%	23	0.53%	10	0.23%	652	15.08%	4,323
Johnson	1,182	50.17%	1,164	49.41%	7	0.30%	3	0.13%	18	0.76%	2,356
Kearney	2,121	65.99%	1,056	32.86%	29	0.90%	8	0.25%	1,065	33.13%	3,214
Keith	2,886	72.31%	1,075	26.94%	24	0.60%	6	0.15%	1,811	45.37%	3,991
Keya Paha	446	74.96%	145	24.37%	4	0.67%	0	0.00%	301	50.59%	595
Kimball	1,321	69.89%	540	28.57%	17	0.90%	12	0.63%	781	41.32%	1,890
Knox	2,644	63.76%	1,477	35.62%	17	0.41%	9	0.22%	1,167	28.14%	4,147
Lancaster	44,744	49.87%	44,396	49.48%	333	0.37%	250	0.28%	348	0.39%	89,723
Lincoln	8,425	57.57%	6,118	41.81%	72	0.49%	19	0.13%	2,307	15.76%	14,634
Logan	373	79.70%	93	19.87%	1	0.21%	1	0.21%	280	59.83%	468
Loup	295	73.75%	98	24.50%	4	1.00%	3	0.75%	197	49.25%	400
Madison	9,137	76.30%	2,779	23.21%	44	0.37%	15	0.13%	6,358	53.09%	11,975
McPherson	229	78.42%	60	20.55%	2	0.68%	1	0.34%	169	57.87%	292
Merrick	2,376	66.15%	1,192	33.18%	15	0.42%	9	0.25%	1,184	32.97%	3,592
Morrill	1,556	66.75%	754	32.35%	14	0.60%	7	0.30%	802	34.40%	2,331
Nance	1,185	59.55%	794	39.90%	9	0.45%	2	0.10%	391	19.65%	1,990
Nemaha	2,295	60.60%	1,457	38.47%	25	0.66%	10	0.26%	838	22.13%	3,787
Nuckolls	1,750	60.53%	1,114	38.53%	14	0.48%	13	0.45%	636	22.00%	2,891
Otoe	3,724	58.50%	2,616	41.09%	21	0.33%	5	0.08%	1,108	17.41%	6,366
Pawnee	975	55.46%	767	43.63%	9	0.51%	7	0.40%	208	11.83%	1,758
Perkins	1,118	69.70%	468	29.18%	15	0.94%	3	0.19%	650	40.52%	1,604
Phelps	3,316	75.59%	1,047	23.87%	15	0.34%	9	0.21%	2,269	51.72%	4,387
Pierce	2,474	72.79%	914	26.89%	7	0.21%	4	0.12%	1,560	45.90%	3,399
Platte	9,040	72.93%	3,285	26.50%	47	0.38%	24	0.19%	5,755	46.43%	12,396
Polk	1,769	64.94%	944	34.65%	7	0.26%	4	0.15%	825	30.29%	2,724
Red Willow	3,331	68.19%	1,511	30.93%	27	0.55%	16	0.33%	1,820	37.26%	4,885
Richardson	2,703	58.02%	1,926	41.34%	18	0.39%	12	0.26%	777	16.68%	4,659
Rock	757	79.10%	198	20.69%	1	0.10%	1	0.10%	559	58.41%	957
Saline	2,355	42.75%	3,125	56.73%	10	0.18%	19	0.34%	-770	-13.98%	5,509
Sarpy	20,192	64.54%	10,947	34.99%	83	0.27%	63	0.20%	9,245	29.55%	31,285
Saunders	4,459	55.46%	3,526	43.86%	34	0.42%	21	0.26%	933	11.60%	8,040
Scotts Bluff	8,613	65.39%	4,464	33.89%	33	0.25%	61	0.46%	4,149	31.50%	13,171
Seward	3,472	55.89%	2,690	43.30%	29	0.47%	21	0.34%	782	12.59%	6,212
Sheridan	2,251	77.67%	612	21.12%	25	0.86%	10	0.35%	1,639	56.55%	2,898
Sherman	915	51.67%	839	47.37%	15	0.85%	2	0.11%	76	4.30%	1,771
Sioux	568	74.05%	194	25.29%	4	0.52%	1	0.13%	374	48.76%	767
Stanton	1,711	72.50%	639	27.08%	6	0.25%	4	0.17%	1,072	45.42%	2,360
Thayer	1,981	59.56%	1,322	39.75%	14	0.42%	9	0.27%	659	19.81%	3,326
Thomas	383	82.19%	81	17.38%	1	0.21%	1	0.21%	302	64.81%	466
Thurston	1,105	47.22%	1,225	52.35%	5	0.21%	5	0.21%	-120	-5.13%	2,340
Valley	1,604	64.08%	873	34.88%	21	0.84%	5	0.20%	731	29.20%	2,503
Washington	4,587	63.80%	2,567	35.70%	25	0.35%	11	0.15%	2,020	28.10%	7,190
Wayne	2,473	68.43%	1,111	30.74%	17	0.47%	13	0.36%	1,362	37.69%	3,614
Webster	1,314	59.03%	891	40.03%	13	0.58%	8	0.36%	423	19.00%	2,226
Wheeler	309	67.91%	141	30.99%	4	0.88%	1	0.22%	168	36.92%	455
York	4,765	72.78%	1,751	26.75%	25	0.38%	6	0.09%	3,014	46.03%	6,547
Totals	398,447	60.15%	259,646	39.20%	2,536	0.38%	1,743	0.26%	138,801	20.95%	662,372

==== Counties that flipped from Republican to Democratic ====
- Dakota
- Saline
- Thurston

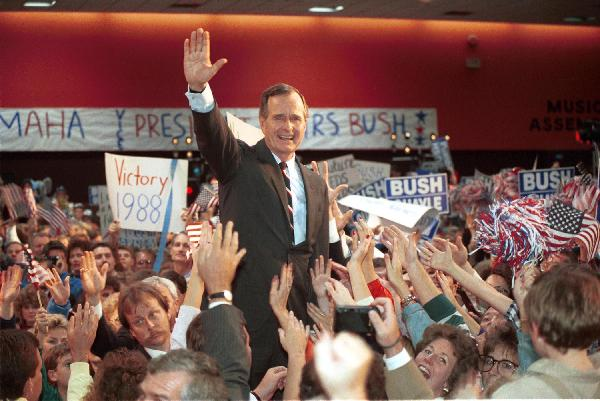
Bush's largely socially conservative rhetoric garnered him much support among social-conservatives nationwide. Seen here at campaign rally in Omaha, Nebraska.

== See also ==
- United States presidential elections in Nebraska
- Presidency of George H. W. Bush
