= Summerland Public Schools =

School district in Nebraska, United States

Summerland Public Schools is a school district and K-12 school based in unincorporated Antelope County, Nebraska.

The school is near where Summerfield Road crosses with 513 Avenue. The district's service area includes Clearwater, Ewing, and Orchard, and the school is in an area in proximity to those three communities. Due to the rural location, LuAnn Schindler of Norfolk Daily News described it as a "cornfield school".

== History ==
The origins were when a sports cooperative group was formed in Spring 2018 by Clearwater Public Schools, Ewing Public Schools, and Orchard Public Schools; the group had cooperative sports teams for the three schools. Clearwater and Orchard had previously been in a merged school district but later had separated into their own districts.

The school district was established on June 5, 2020, by the merger of Clearwater, Ewing, and Orchard districts. The merged district initially kept the three separate schools open on a temporary basis.

The district's voters, in November 2019, voted in favor of a bond to build a consolidated school. The Clearwater voters approved on a 332-103 basis, Ewing voters approved on a 360-38 basis, and Orchard approved on a 289-230 basis. The Ewing, then Clearwater, and then Orchard results were announced.

The bond has a cost of $34.3 million. Construction began in spring 2020, and the school opened in October 2021. That month the student count was 417.

== See also ==
- List of school districts in Nebraska
