= 1900 United States presidential election in Nebraska =

- November 6, 1900
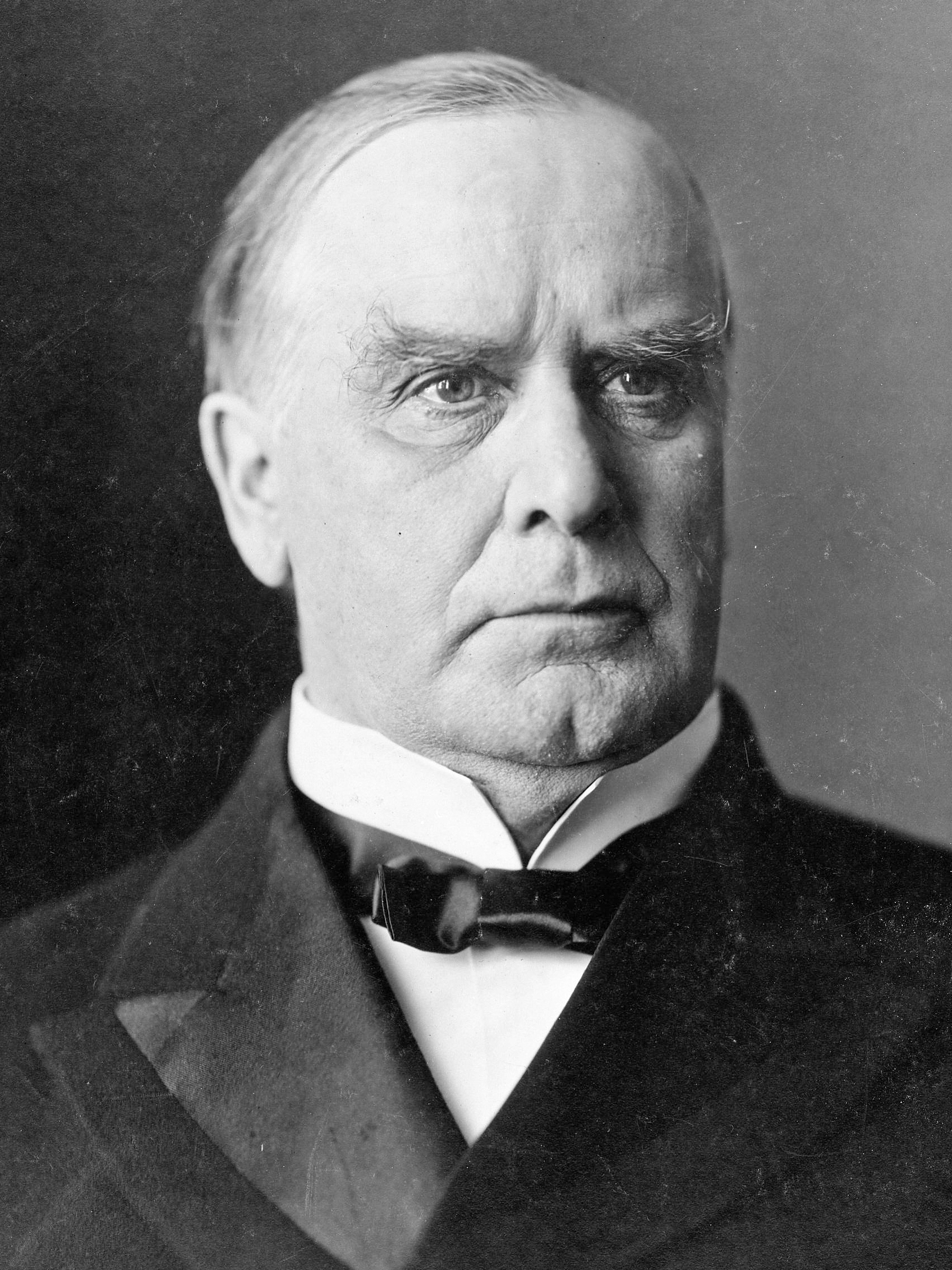

Nominee	William McKinley	William Jennings Bryan
Party	Republican	Democratic
Home state	Ohio	Nebraska
Running mate	Theodore Roosevelt	Adlai Stevenson I
Electoral vote	8	0
Popular vote	121,835	114,013
Percentage	50.46%	47.22%
County results
McKinley
40–50%
50–60%
60–70%
70–80%
Bryan
40–50%
50–60%
60–70%
President before election
William McKinley
Republican
Elected President
William McKinley
Republican

The 1900 United States presidential election in Nebraska took place on November 6, 1900. All contemporary 45 states were part of the 1900 United States presidential election. Voters chose eight electors to the Electoral College, which selected the president and vice president.

Nebraska was won by the Republican nominees, incumbent President William McKinley of Ohio and his running mate Theodore Roosevelt of New York. They defeated the Democratic nominees, former U.S. Representative, 1896 Democratic presidential nominee and Nebraska native William Jennings Bryan and his running mate, former Vice President Adlai Stevenson I. McKinley won the state by a narrow margin of 3.24% in this rematch of the 1896 presidential election. The return of economic prosperity and recent victory in the Spanish–American War helped McKinley to score a decisive victory.

Bryan had previously defeated McKinley in the state four years earlier and would later win it again against William Howard Taft in 1908.

== Results ==
1900 United States presidential election in Nebraska
Party	Candidate	Votes	Percentage	Electoral votes
Republican	William McKinley (incumbent)	121,835	50.46%	8
Democratic	William Jennings Bryan	114,013	47.22%	0
Prohibition	John G. Woolley	3,655	1.51%	0
Populist	Wharton Barker	1,104	0.46%	0
Social Democratic	Eugene V. Debs	823	0.34%	0
Totals		241,430	100.00%	8
Voter turnout				—

=== Results by county ===
County	William McKinley Republican		William Jennings Bryan Democratic		John G. Woolley Prohibition		Wharton Barker Populist		Eugene V. Debs Socialist		Margin		Total votes cast
County	#	%	#	%	#	%	#	%	#	%	#	%	Total votes cast
Adams	1,992	47.36%	2,114	50.26%	70	1.66%	25	0.59%	5	0.12%	-122	-2.90%	4,206
Antelope	1,342	48.75%	1,356	49.26%	41	1.49%	8	0.29%	6	0.22%	-14	-0.51%	2,753
Banner	186	69.92%	71	26.69%	4	1.50%	1	0.38%	4	1.50%	115	43.23%	266
Blaine	103	57.54%	75	41.90%	0	0.00%	1	0.56%	0	0.00%	28	15.64%	179
Boone	1,524	52.28%	1,336	45.83%	39	1.34%	13	0.45%	3	0.10%	188	6.45%	2,915
Box Butte	707	57.43%	494	40.13%	11	0.89%	2	0.16%	17	1.38%	213	17.30%	1,231
Boyd	771	47.45%	795	48.92%	46	2.83%	8	0.49%	5	0.31%	-24	-1.48%	1,625
Brown	470	57.39%	327	39.93%	10	1.22%	9	1.10%	3	0.37%	143	17.46%	819
Buffalo	1,916	46.45%	2,056	49.84%	75	1.82%	44	1.07%	34	0.82%	-140	-3.39%	4,125
Burt	1,929	61.30%	1,174	37.31%	30	0.95%	8	0.25%	6	0.19%	755	23.99%	3,147
Butler	1,481	39.96%	2,147	57.93%	59	1.59%	15	0.40%	4	0.11%	-666	-17.97%	3,706
Cass	2,922	55.02%	2,259	42.53%	84	1.58%	12	0.23%	34	0.64%	663	12.48%	5,311
Cedar	1,441	47.35%	1,565	51.43%	29	0.95%	8	0.26%	0	0.00%	-124	-4.07%	3,043
Chase	313	51.57%	274	45.14%	15	2.47%	5	0.82%	0	0.00%	39	6.43%	607
Cherry	922	55.24%	698	41.82%	34	2.04%	9	0.54%	6	0.36%	224	13.42%	1,669
Cheyenne	714	56.98%	509	40.62%	23	1.84%	7	0.56%	0	0.00%	205	16.36%	1,253
Clay	1,932	50.46%	1,826	47.69%	58	1.51%	5	0.13%	8	0.21%	106	2.77%	3,829
Colfax	1,033	42.63%	1,357	56.00%	16	0.66%	8	0.33%	9	0.37%	-324	-13.37%	2,423
Cuming	1,385	43.84%	1,736	54.95%	19	0.60%	12	0.38%	7	0.22%	-351	-11.11%	3,159
Custer	2,145	47.24%	2,159	47.54%	111	2.44%	107	2.36%	19	0.42%	-14	-0.31%	4,541
Dakota	692	46.35%	777	52.04%	20	1.34%	2	0.13%	2	0.13%	-85	-5.69%	1,493
Dawes	613	49.32%	587	47.22%	19	1.53%	5	0.40%	19	1.53%	26	2.09%	1,243
Dawson	1,280	46.36%	1,399	50.67%	64	2.32%	13	0.47%	5	0.18%	-119	-4.31%	2,761
Deuel	403	61.34%	241	36.68%	5	0.76%	4	0.61%	4	0.61%	162	24.66%	657
Dixon	1,285	52.45%	1,101	44.94%	43	1.76%	12	0.49%	9	0.37%	184	7.51%	2,450
Dodge	2,632	51.49%	2,410	47.14%	51	1.00%	9	0.18%	10	0.20%	222	4.34%	5,112
Douglas	14,266	50.88%	13,241	47.23%	175	0.62%	39	0.14%	316	1.13%	1,025	3.66%	28,037
Dundy	308	50.99%	283	46.85%	4	0.66%	8	1.32%	1	0.17%	25	4.14%	604
Fillmore	1,883	49.60%	1,860	49.00%	37	0.97%	12	0.32%	4	0.11%	23	0.61%	3,796
Franklin	984	45.47%	1,122	51.85%	40	1.85%	14	0.65%	4	0.18%	-138	-6.38%	2,164
Frontier	930	51.96%	810	45.25%	19	1.06%	25	1.40%	6	0.34%	120	6.70%	1,790
Furnas	1,321	48.85%	1,319	48.78%	49	1.81%	11	0.41%	4	0.15%	2	0.07%	2,704
Gage	4,141	58.65%	2,701	38.25%	198	2.80%	16	0.23%	5	0.07%	1,440	20.39%	7,061
Garfield	251	50.50%	235	47.28%	4	0.80%	7	1.41%	0	0.00%	16	3.22%	497
Gosper	494	45.24%	570	52.20%	20	1.83%	5	0.46%	3	0.27%	-76	-6.96%	1,092
Grant	148	59.20%	97	38.80%	1	0.40%	4	1.60%	0	0.00%	51	20.40%	250
Greeley	463	34.17%	880	64.94%	2	0.15%	9	0.66%	1	0.07%	-417	-30.77%	1,355
Hall	2,017	52.15%	1,766	45.66%	43	1.11%	20	0.52%	22	0.57%	251	6.49%	3,868
Hamilton	1,524	47.85%	1,571	49.32%	78	2.45%	9	0.28%	3	0.09%	-47	-1.48%	3,185
Harlan	880	44.74%	977	49.67%	94	4.78%	12	0.61%	4	0.20%	-97	-4.93%	1,967
Hayes	308	49.20%	284	45.37%	5	0.80%	12	1.92%	17	2.72%	24	3.83%	626
Hitchcock	450	45.36%	528	53.23%	9	0.91%	4	0.40%	1	0.10%	-78	-7.86%	992
Holt	1,320	45.05%	1,492	50.92%	86	2.94%	18	0.61%	14	0.48%	-172	-5.87%	2,930
Hooker	37	44.58%	43	51.81%	1	1.20%	2	2.41%	0	0.00%	-6	-7.23%	83
Howard	908	40.48%	1,283	57.20%	30	1.34%	16	0.71%	6	0.27%	-375	-16.72%	2,243
Jefferson	1,862	53.09%	1,587	45.25%	41	1.17%	14	0.40%	3	0.09%	275	7.84%	3,507
Johnson	1,532	54.85%	1,179	42.21%	68	2.43%	10	0.36%	4	0.14%	353	12.64%	2,793
Kearney	1,055	47.20%	1,109	49.62%	45	2.01%	21	0.94%	5	0.22%	-54	-2.42%	2,235
Keith	246	52.34%	216	45.96%	4	0.85%	3	0.64%	1	0.21%	30	6.38%	470
Keya Paha	380	49.74%	353	46.20%	18	2.36%	8	1.05%	5	0.65%	27	3.53%	764
Kimball	137	72.11%	48	25.26%	3	1.58%	2	1.05%	0	0.00%	89	46.84%	190
Knox	1,600	47.80%	1,630	48.70%	65	1.94%	43	1.28%	9	0.27%	-30	-0.90%	3,347
Lancaster	7,465	55.27%	5,677	42.03%	306	2.27%	41	0.30%	18	0.13%	1,788	13.24%	13,507
Lincoln	1,386	53.06%	1,169	44.75%	31	1.19%	21	0.80%	5	0.19%	217	8.31%	2,612
Logan	107	49.77%	102	47.44%	6	2.79%	0	0.00%	0	0.00%	5	2.33%	215
Loup	149	51.56%	137	47.40%	1	0.35%	2	0.69%	0	0.00%	12	4.15%	289
Madison	2,060	54.07%	1,690	44.36%	46	1.21%	12	0.31%	2	0.05%	370	9.71%	3,810
McPherson	85	59.86%	54	38.03%	2	1.41%	1	0.70%	0	0.00%	31	21.83%	142
Merrick	1,212	52.29%	996	42.97%	98	4.23%	6	0.26%	6	0.26%	216	9.32%	2,318
Nance	1,091	54.77%	853	42.82%	26	1.31%	21	1.05%	1	0.05%	238	11.95%	1,992
Nemaha	1,783	48.88%	1,779	48.77%	56	1.54%	15	0.41%	15	0.41%	4	0.11%	3,648
Nuckolls	1,471	49.08%	1,480	49.38%	30	1.00%	13	0.43%	3	0.10%	-9	-0.30%	2,997
Otoe	2,718	52.74%	2,327	45.15%	86	1.67%	17	0.33%	6	0.12%	391	7.59%	5,154
Pawnee	1,632	56.90%	1,121	39.09%	96	3.35%	15	0.52%	4	0.14%	511	17.82%	2,868
Perkins	184	43.50%	231	54.61%	6	1.42%	2	0.47%	0	0.00%	-47	-11.11%	423
Phelps	1,202	53.26%	979	43.38%	49	2.17%	25	1.11%	2	0.09%	223	9.88%	2,257
Pierce	919	49.54%	913	49.22%	19	1.02%	3	0.16%	1	0.05%	6	0.32%	1,855
Platte	1,608	42.56%	2,117	56.03%	33	0.87%	15	0.40%	5	0.13%	-509	-13.47%	3,778
Polk	1,023	41.25%	1,376	55.48%	67	2.70%	11	0.44%	3	0.12%	-353	-14.23%	2,480
Red Willow	1,192	55.26%	905	41.96%	38	1.76%	16	0.74%	6	0.28%	287	13.31%	2,157
Richardson	2,491	49.12%	2,529	49.87%	38	0.75%	8	0.16%	5	0.10%	-38	-0.75%	5,071
Rock	481	65.71%	243	33.20%	6	0.82%	1	0.14%	1	0.14%	238	32.51%	732
Saline	2,238	51.31%	2,018	46.26%	76	1.74%	22	0.50%	8	0.18%	220	5.04%	4,362
Sarpy	792	41.08%	1,090	56.54%	34	1.76%	4	0.21%	8	0.41%	-298	-15.46%	1,928
Saunders	2,325	44.82%	2,762	53.25%	74	1.43%	12	0.23%	14	0.27%	-437	-8.42%	5,187
Scotts Bluff	400	56.66%	276	39.09%	16	2.27%	9	1.27%	5	0.71%	124	17.56%	706
Seward	1,937	50.30%	1,865	48.43%	40	1.04%	9	0.23%	0	0.00%	72	1.87%	3,851
Sheridan	626	45.59%	703	51.20%	22	1.60%	18	1.31%	4	0.29%	-77	-5.61%	1,373
Sherman	503	38.63%	743	57.07%	15	1.15%	17	1.31%	24	1.84%	-240	-18.43%	1,302
Sioux	199	44.42%	248	55.36%	1	0.22%	0	0.00%	0	0.00%	-49	-10.94%	448
Stanton	788	50.48%	751	48.11%	11	0.70%	11	0.70%	0	0.00%	37	2.37%	1,561
Thayer	1,825	54.09%	1,516	44.93%	26	0.77%	4	0.12%	3	0.09%	309	9.16%	3,374
Thomas	65	43.62%	80	53.69%	3	2.01%	0	0.00%	1	0.67%	-15	-10.07%	149
Thurston	803	54.51%	656	44.53%	12	0.81%	1	0.07%	1	0.07%	147	9.98%	1,473
Valley	810	47.40%	864	50.56%	22	1.29%	10	0.59%	3	0.18%	-54	-3.16%	1,709
Washington	1,741	54.39%	1,412	44.11%	29	0.91%	11	0.34%	8	0.25%	329	10.28%	3,201
Wayne	1,246	56.18%	951	42.88%	12	0.54%	8	0.36%	1	0.05%	295	13.30%	2,218
Webster	1,355	49.67%	1,322	48.46%	31	1.14%	20	0.73%	0	0.00%	33	1.21%	2,728
Wheeler	138	42.86%	180	55.90%	1	0.31%	2	0.62%	1	0.31%	-42	-13.04%	322
York	2,207	53.05%	1,871	44.98%	75	1.80%	5	0.12%	2	0.05%	336	8.08%	4,160
Totals	121,835	50.46%	114,013	47.22%	3,655	1.51%	1,104	0.46%	823	0.34%	7,822	3.24%	241,430

== See also ==
- United States presidential elections in Nebraska
