= Johnson County Central Public Schools =

School district in Nebraska, United States

Johnson County Central Public Schools (ID# 49-0050-000, JCC) is a school district headquartered in Tecumseh, Nebraska. It has its elementary and high school in Tecumseh and its middle school in Cook.

It was created on May 31, 2007 with the merger of Tecumseh Public Schools and Nemaha Valley Schools.

It inherited its Future Farmers of America program from Nemaha Valley and its advanced classes from Tecumseh.

== Service area ==
Within Johnson County, the district includes Tecumseh, Cook, and Elk Creek. In Otoe County, it includes Lorton, Talmage, and Burr.
