= Paul, Nebraska =

Unincorporated community in Nebraska, U.S.

Coordinates: 40°35′43″N 95°53′48″W

Paul is an unincorporated community in Otoe County, Nebraska, in the United States.

== History ==
A post office was established at Paul in 1884, and remained in operation until it was discontinued in 1955. The community was named for Paulinus Kuwitzky, the original owner of the town site. A notable site in the community is the former Paul Tavern, now a private residence.

Paul was a station on the Missouri Pacific Railroad.
