= Burr, Nebraska =

Village in Otoe County, Nebraska, United States

- Village
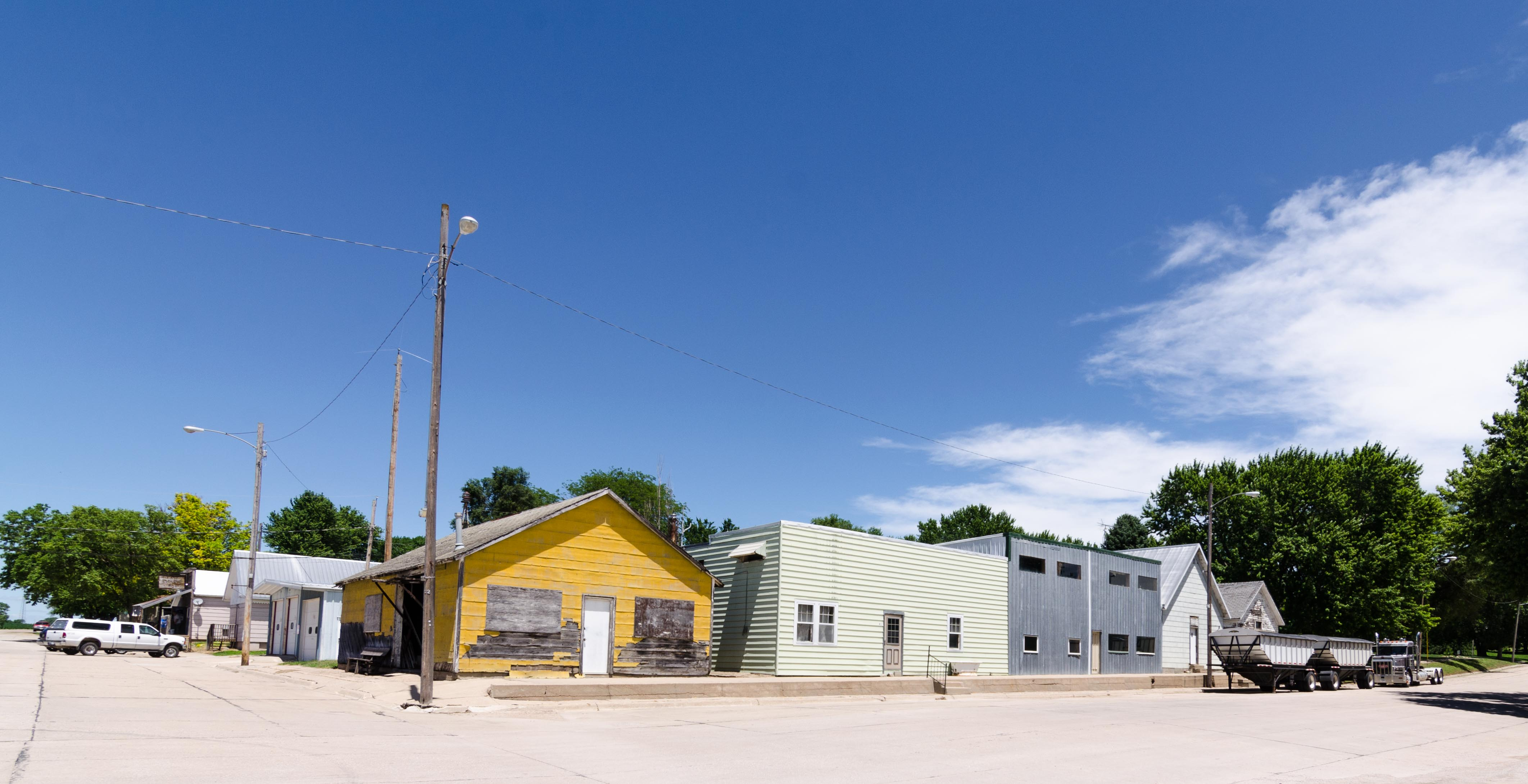
- Corner of 4th and Main Street in Burr, June 2017

- Location of Burr, Nebraska
- Coordinates: 40°32′09″N 96°17′59″W
- Country: United States
- State: Nebraska
- County: Otoe

Area
  - Total: 0.085 sq mi (0.22 km^{2})
  - Land: 0.085 sq mi (0.22 km^{2})
  - Water: 0 sq mi (0.00 km^{2})
- Elevation: 1,132 ft (345 m)

Population (2020)
  - Total: 52
  - Density: 607.1/sq mi (234.41/km^{2})
- Time zone: UTC-6 (Central (CST))
  - Summer (DST): UTC-5 (CDT)
- ZIP code: 68324
- Area code: 402
- FIPS code: 31-07205
- GNIS feature ID: 2397504

Burr is a village in Otoe County, Nebraska, United States. The population was 52 at the 2020 census.

== History ==
Burr was platted in the 1880s when the railroad was extended to that point. The community was named for the burr oak trees near the original town site.

== Geography ==
According to the United States Census Bureau, the village has a total area of 0.09 square miles (0.23 km^{2}), all land.

== Demographics ==
Historical population
Census	Pop.	Note	%±
1910	113		—
1920	133		17.7%
1930	122		−8.3%
1940	263		115.6%
1950	91		−65.4%
1960	81		−11.0%
1970	108		33.3%
1980	101		−6.5%
1990	75		−25.7%
2000	66		−12.0%
2010	57		−13.6%
2020	52		−8.8%
U.S. Decennial Census

=== 2010 census ===
As of the census of 2010, there were 57 people, 30 households, and 16 families living in the village. The population density was 633.3 inhabitants per square mile (244.5/km^{2}). There were 40 housing units at an average density of 444.4 per square mile (171.6/km^{2}). The racial makeup of the village was 100.0% White.

There were 30 households, of which 16.7% had children under the age of 18 living with them, 53.3% were married couples living together, and 46.7% were non-families. 40.0% of all households were made up of individuals, and 16.7% had someone living alone who was 65 years of age or older. The average household size was 1.90 and the average family size was 2.44.

The median age in the village was 51.3 years. 15.8% of residents were under the age of 18; 0% were between the ages of 18 and 24; 24.6% were from 25 to 44; 36.8% were from 45 to 64; and 22.8% were 65 years of age or older. The gender makeup of the village was 47.4% male and 52.6% female.

=== 2000 census ===
At the 2000 census, there were 66 people, 36 households and 16 families living in the village. The population density was 784.7 inhabitants per square mile (303.0/km^{2}). There were 40 housing units at an average density of 475.6 per square mile (183.6/km^{2}). The racial makeup of the village was 100.00% White.

There were 36 households, of which 11.1% had children under the age of 18 living with them, 44.4% were married couples living together, 2.8% had a female householder with no husband present, and 52.8% were non-families. 47.2% of all households were made up of individuals, and 25.0% had someone living alone who was 65 years of age or older. The average household size was 1.83 and the average family size was 2.65.

16.7% of the population were under the age of 18, 7.6% from 18 to 24, 21.2% from 25 to 44, 31.8% from 45 to 64, and 22.7% who were 65 years of age or older. The median age was 46 years. For every 100 females, there were 100.0 males. For every 100 females age 18 and over, there were 83.3 males.

As of 2000 the median income for a household was $35,000, and the median family income was $38,125. Males had a median income of $31,786 versus $23,750 for females. The per capita income for the village was $20,113. There were no families and 5.3% of the population living below the poverty line, including no under eighteens and 11.1% of those over 64.

== Education ==
Burr is within the Johnson County Central Public Schools.

was formerly in Nemaha Valley Schools. In 2007 Nemaha Valley merged into Johnson County Central Public Schools.

== Notable person ==
- Dean Steinkuhler - football offensive lineman for the Nebraska Cornhuskers and Houston Oilers, winner of the 1983 Outland Trophy and Lombardi Award

== See also ==
- List of municipalities in Nebraska
