= Conestoga Public Schools =

School district in Nebraska, United States

Conestoga Public Schools is a consolidated school district located in southeast Nebraska in the United States, serving the communities of Murray, Beaver Lake, Union, Lake Waconda, and Nehawka, and throughout rural Cass County. The district serves approximately 600 students in pre-kindergarten through twelfth grades at two schools, Conestoga Elementary and Conestoga Junior/Senior High School.

The Conestoga Junior/Senior High School is located west of Murray, NE at 8404 42nd Street, Murray, NE 68409 and the Conestoga Elementary is in the city limits at 104 E High Street, Murray, NE 68409.

In 2006, the district moved from a traditional five-day school week to a four-day week in order to trim its budget deficit. Administrators found the move created $100,000 in annual savings. That outcome prompted Iowa lawmakers to consider allowing their local districts to make the same move in November 2008. In early 2008, the district paid off $1.5 million of operating debt. The district closed Nehawka Middle School, combined its junior and senior high buildings, eliminated 13 staff positions and switched to a four-day school week.
