= Nemaha Valley Schools (Nebraska) =

School district in Nebraska, United States

Nemaha Valley Schools (ID#49-0501-000) was a school district in Nebraska.

The district's service area included Cook, Burr, Lorton, and Talmage.

== History ==
Charles Finley served as superintendent until June 30, 1972.

In 1992, the Burr Public School District dissolved, with Nemaha Valley taking some of the territory.

In 1993, the Spring Creek Public School District dissolved, with Nemaha Valley taking some of the territory.

Gary Anderson served as principal until his 2001 resignation.

The voters allowed for increased taxes with a levy override voted in November 2005. However, state aid declined to its smallest number in 2007.

In the 2006-07 school year, the enrollment count was 192, and there were to be about 30 less students for a 2007-08 school year. In 2007, the district agreed to merge with Tecumseh Public Schools.

Starting from May 31, 2007, Nemaha Valley merged into Johnson County Central Public Schools.

== Student programs ==
Nemaha Valley, by 2007, had a Future Farmers of America program.

== See also ==
- List of school districts in Nebraska
