= Talmage, Nebraska =

- Village
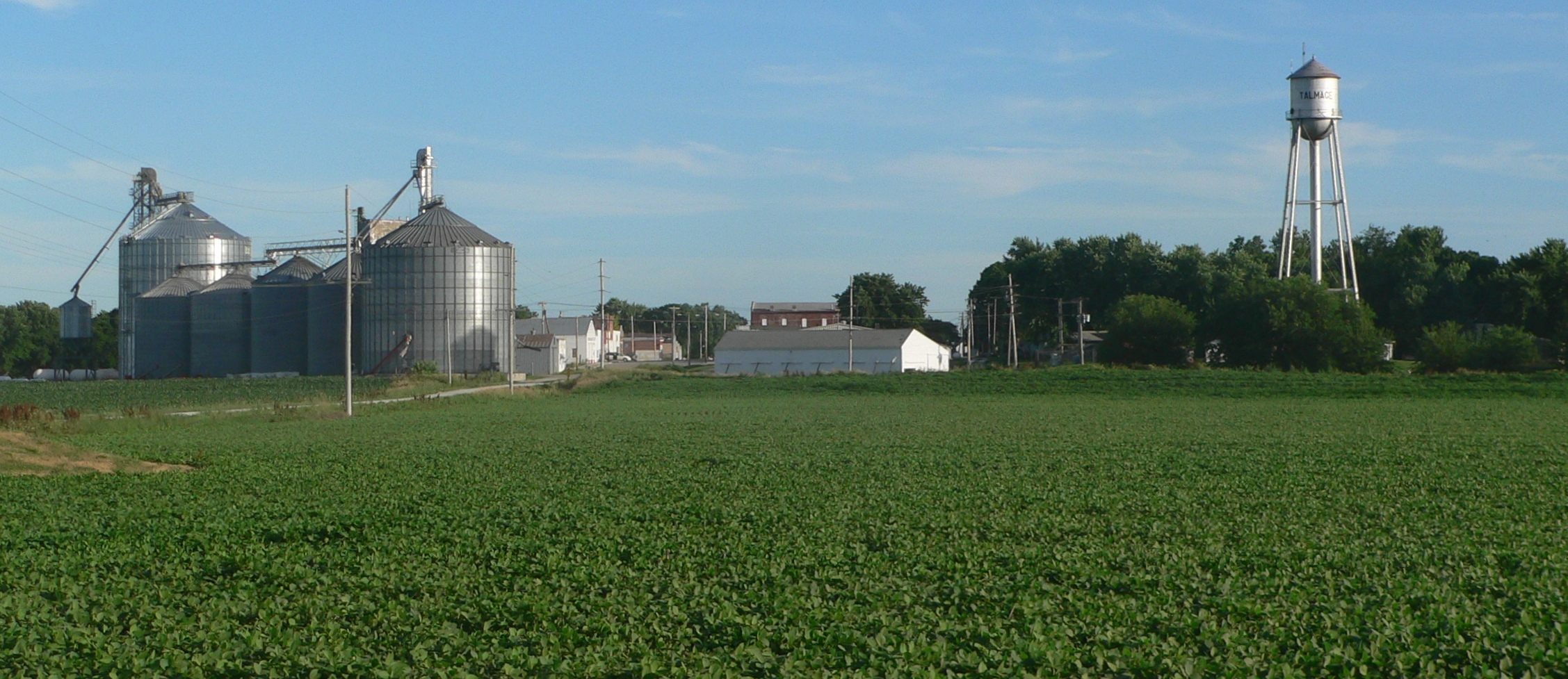
- Talmage, seen from the north

- Location of Talmage, Nebraska
- Coordinates: 40°31′54″N 96°01′26″W
- Country: United States
- State: Nebraska
- County: Otoe

Area
  - Total: 0.16 sq mi (0.42 km^{2})
  - Land: 0.16 sq mi (0.42 km^{2})
  - Water: 0 sq mi (0.00 km^{2})
- Elevation: 991 ft (302 m)

Population (2020)
  - Total: 198
  - Density: 1,208.3/sq mi (466.54/km^{2})
- Time zone: UTC-6 (Central (CST))
  - Summer (DST): UTC-5 (CDT)
- ZIP code: 68448
- Area code: 402
- FIPS code: 31-48305
- GNIS feature ID: 2399949
- Website: s

Talmage is a village in Otoe County, Nebraska, United States. The population was 198 at the 2020 census.

== Geography ==
Talmage is located at 40°31′54″N 96°1′25″W (40.531767, -96.023678).

According to the United States Census Bureau, the village has a total area of 0.16 square miles (0.41 km^{2}), all land.

The town is located southeast of Lincoln and south of Omaha, lying just west of Nebraska Highway 67.

== History ==
The area in the vicinity of Talmage began to be settled in the late 1850s. The Missouri Pacific Railroad's Kansas City-Omaha line construction reached the area by 1881. The town was platted on March 7, 1882, on land donated by local farmer Clark Puffer. It was named for Archibald A. Talmage, a superintendent of the railroad,

Talmage was the birthplace (in 1913) of film actor Anthony Dexter.

== Demographics ==
Historical population
Census	Pop.	Note	%±
1890	429		—
1900	489		14.0%
1910	461		−5.7%
1920	525		13.9%
1930	474		−9.7%
1940	423		−10.8%
1950	398		−5.9%
1960	361		−9.3%
1970	285		−21.1%
1980	246		−13.7%
1990	246		0.0%
2000	268		8.9%
2010	233		−13.1%
2020	198		−15.0%
U.S. Decennial Census

=== 2010 census ===
As of the census of 2010, there were 233 people, 97 households, and 66 families residing in the village. The population density was 1,456.3 inhabitants per square mile (562.3/km^{2}). There were 118 housing units at an average density of 737.5 per square mile (284.8/km^{2}). The racial makeup of the village was 93.6% White, 1.3% African American, 3.4% from other races, and 1.7% from two or more races. Hispanic or Latino of any race were 7.3% of the population.

There were 97 households, of which 25.8% had children under the age of 18 living with them, 47.4% were married couples living together, 10.3% had a female householder with no husband present, 10.3% had a male householder with no wife present, and 32.0% were non-families. 25.8% of all households were made up of individuals, and 10.3% had someone living alone who was 65 years of age or older. The average household size was 2.40 and the average family size was 2.79.

The median age in the village was 45.5 years. 22.7% of residents were under the age of 18; 7.3% were between the ages of 18 and 24; 19.3% were from 25 to 44; 32.2% were from 45 to 64; and 18.5% were 65 years of age or older. The gender makeup of the village was 51.5% male and 48.5% female.

=== 2000 census ===
As of the census of 2000, there were 268 people, 109 households, and 70 families residing in the village. The population density was 1,663.0 inhabitants per square mile (642.1/km^{2}). There were 127 housing units at an average density of 788.1 per square mile (304.3/km^{2}). The racial makeup of the village was 97.01% White and 2.99% African American.

There were 109 households, out of which 28.4% had children under the age of 18 living with them, 54.1% were married couples living together, 8.3% had a female householder with no husband present, and 34.9% were non-families. 32.1% of all households were made up of individuals, and 22.9% had someone living alone who was 65 years of age or older. The average household size was 2.46 and the average family size was 3.13.

In the village, the population was spread out, with 27.2% under the age of 18, 9.0% from 18 to 24, 23.1% from 25 to 44, 21.3% from 45 to 64, and 19.4% who were 65 years of age or older. The median age was 38 years. For every 100 females, there were 95.6 males. For every 100 females age 18 and over, there were 99.0 males.

As of 2000 the median income for a household in the village was $25,625, and the median income for a family was $37,000. Males had a median income of $25,556 versus $21,250 for females. The per capita income for the village was $13,525. About 14.7% of families and 18.8% of the population were below the poverty line, including 26.7% of those under the age of eighteen and 14.5% of those sixty-five or over.

== Education ==
Talmage is in Johnson County Central Public Schools.

Talmage was formerly in Nemaha Valley Schools. In 2007 Nemaha Valley merged into Johnson County Central Public Schools.
