= Tecumseh Public Schools (Nebraska) =

School district in Nebraska, United States

Tecumseh Public Schools (ID#49-0032-000) was a school district in Nebraska.

In 2007 its student count was 373.

== History ==
In 2001 Sand Ridge Public School District closed. Tecumseh Public Schools absorbed a portion of that district.

The student enrollment figures significantly declined after the closure of the MBA Poultry concern in Tecumseh in 2005. In 2007 the district agreed to merge with Nemaha Valley Schools.

On May 31, 2007 Tecumseh merged into Johnson County Central Public Schools.

== See also ==
- List of school districts in Nebraska
