= Elk Creek, Nebraska =

- Village
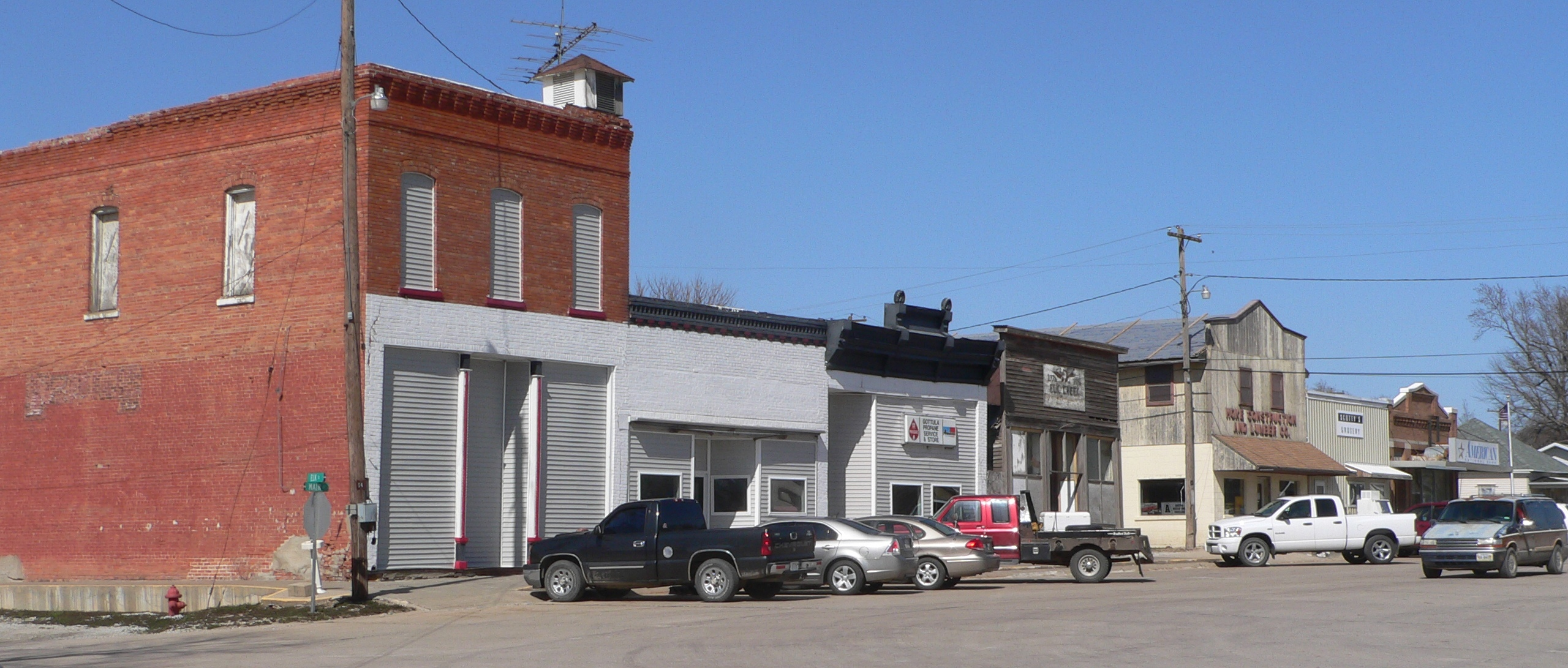
- Downtown Elk Creek

- Location of Elk Creek, Nebraska
- Coordinates: 40°17′18″N 96°07′37″W
- Country: United States
- State: Nebraska
- County: Johnson

Area
  - Total: 0.13 sq mi (0.34 km^{2})
  - Land: 0.13 sq mi (0.34 km^{2})
  - Water: 0 sq mi (0.00 km^{2})
- Elevation: 1,102 ft (336 m)

Population (2020)
  - Total: 67
  - Estimate (2021): 67
  - Density: 510/sq mi (200/km^{2})
- Time zone: UTC-6 (Central (CST))
  - Summer (DST): UTC-5 (CDT)
- ZIP code: 68348
- Area code: 402
- FIPS code: 31-14975
- GNIS feature ID: 2398802

Elk Creek is a village in Johnson County, Nebraska, United States. The population was 67 at the 2020 census.

== History ==
Elk Creek got its start circa 1873, following construction of the Atchison and Nebraska Railroad through the territory. It took its name from nearby Elk Creek, which was named for the elk once seen there.

== Geography ==
According to the United States Census Bureau, the village has a total area of 0.13 square miles (0.34 km^{2}), all land.

== Demographics ==
Historical population
Census	Pop.	Note	%±
1880	139		—
1890	216		55.4%
1900	347		60.6%
1910	240		−30.8%
1920	218		−9.2%
1930	260		19.3%
1940	199		−23.5%
1950	176		−11.6%
1960	170		−3.4%
1970	151		−11.2%
1980	144		−4.6%
1990	116		−19.4%
2000	112		−3.4%
2010	98		−12.5%
2020	69		−29.6%
2021 (est.)	67	▼	−2.9%
U.S. Decennial Census

=== 2010 census ===
As of the census of 2010, there were 98 people, 47 households, and 29 families residing in the village. The population density was 753.8 inhabitants per square mile (291.0/km^{2}). There were 57 housing units at an average density of 438.5 per square mile (169.3/km^{2}). The racial makeup of the village was 96.9% White, 1.0% African American, and 2.0% Native American. Hispanic or Latino of any race were 3.1% of the population.

There were 47 households, of which 23.4% had children under the age of 18 living with them, 51.1% were married couples living together, 6.4% had a female householder with no husband present, 4.3% had a male householder with no wife present, and 38.3% were non-families. 34.0% of all households were made up of individuals, and 12.8% had someone living alone who was 65 years of age or older. The average household size was 2.09 and the average family size was 2.62.

The median age in the village was 48.4 years. 15.3% of residents were under the age of 18; 6.2% were between the ages of 18 and 24; 20.5% were from 25 to 44; 32.6% were from 45 to 64; and 25.5% were 65 years of age or older. The gender makeup of the village was 51.0% male and 49.0% female.

=== 2000 census ===
As of the census of 2000, there were 112 people, 48 households, and 32 families residing in the village. The population density was 859.3 inhabitants per square mile (331.8/km^{2}). There were 60 housing units at an average density of 460.3 per square mile (177.7/km^{2}). The racial makeup of the village was 95.54% White, 0.89% African American, 1.79% Native American, 0.89% from other races, and 0.89% from two or more races. Hispanic or Latino of any race were 0.89% of the population.

There were 48 households, out of which 33.3% had children under the age of 18 living with them, 50.0% were married couples living together, 12.5% had a female householder with no husband present, and 33.3% were non-families. 25.0% of all households were made up of individuals, and 18.8% had someone living alone who was 65 years of age or older. The average household size was 2.33 and the average family size was 2.72.

In the village, the population was spread out, with 23.2% under the age of 18, 6.3% from 18 to 24, 30.4% from 25 to 44, 16.1% from 45 to 64, and 24.1% who were 65 years of age or older. The median age was 38 years. For every 100 females, there were 96.5 males. For every 100 females age 18 and over, there were 91.1 males.

As of 2000 the median income for a household in the village was $26,250, and the median income for a family was $30,833. Males had a median income of $25,625 versus $6,667 for females. The per capita income for the village was $12,606. There were 12.5% of families and 13.2% of the population living below the poverty line, including 13.9% of under eighteens and 7.7% of those over 64.

== Economy ==
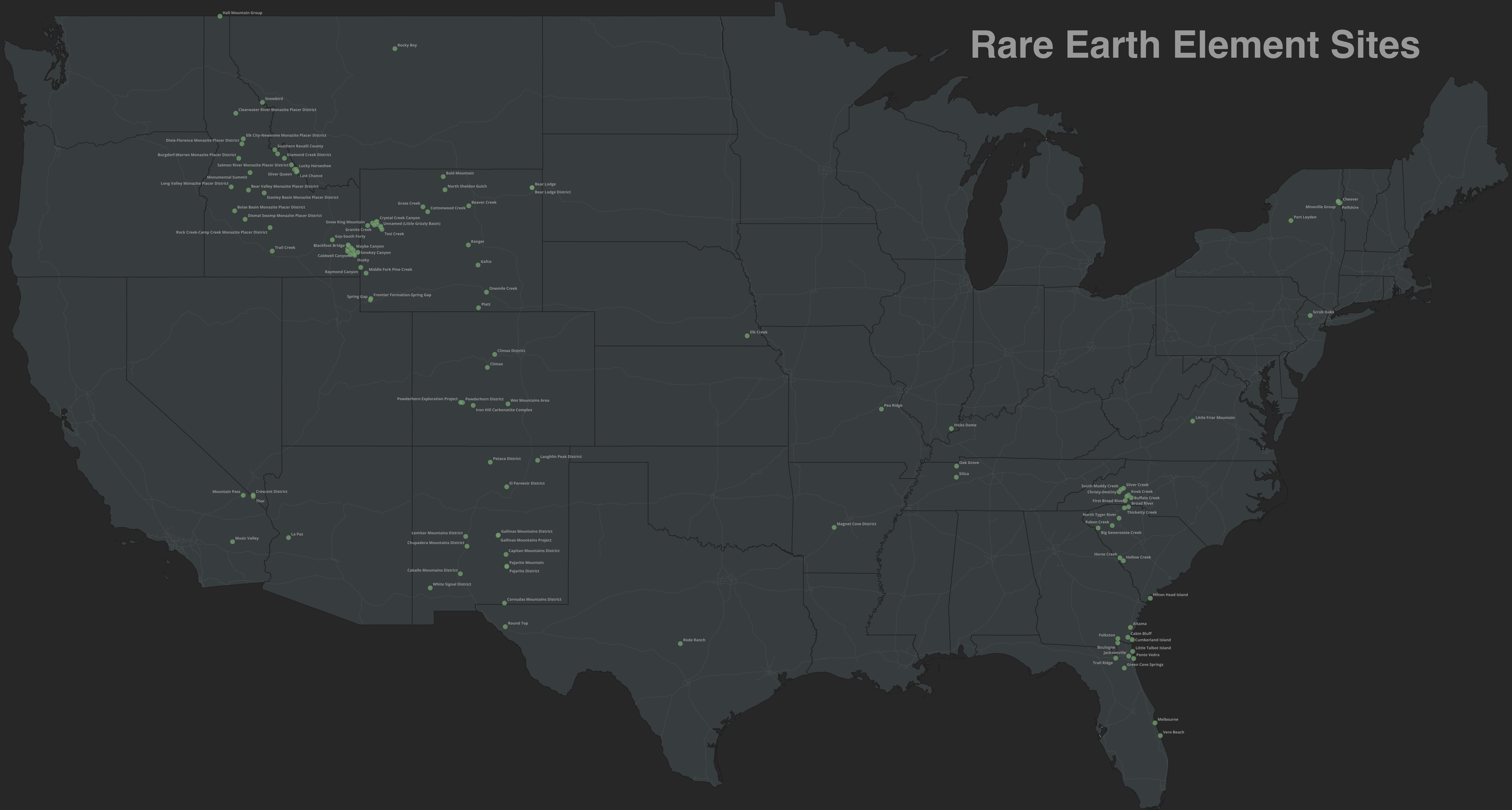
Rare Earth Elements Map

In 2011, interest in deep-mining of deposits of rare earth minerals southwest of Elk Creek was rekindled. Mining the scandium and titanium has been discussed since the 1970s.

== Education ==
It is in the Johnson County Central Public Schools school district.

== Notable people ==
- David Jacques Way (1918–1994), harpsichord builder
