= Cook, Nebraska =

- Village
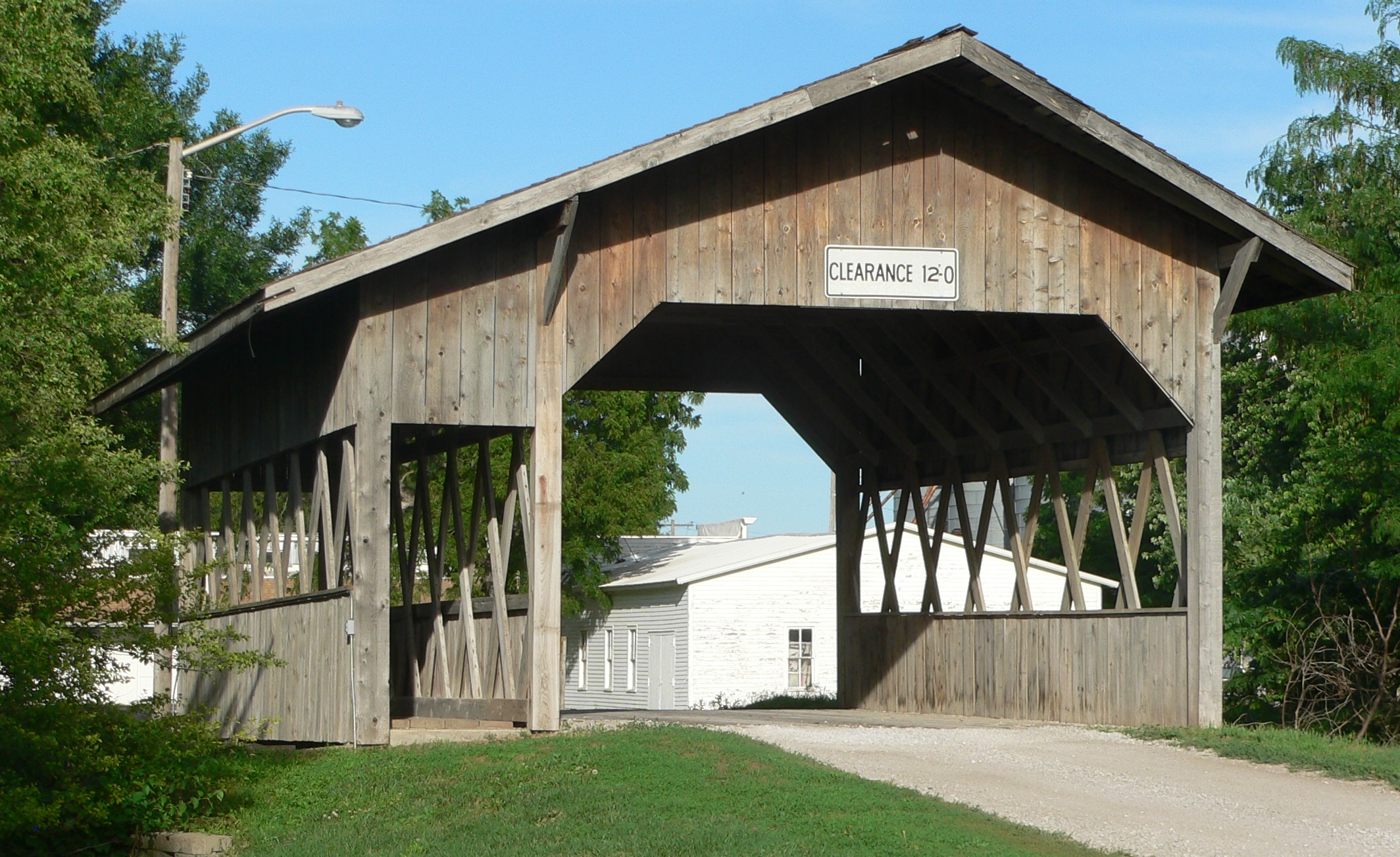
- The 1989 Duane Carman bridge in Cook is the only covered bridge in Nebraska.

- Location of Cook, Nebraska
- Coordinates: 40°30′38″N 96°09′42″W
- Country: United States
- State: Nebraska
- County: Johnson

Area
  - Total: 0.17 sq mi (0.45 km^{2})
  - Land: 0.17 sq mi (0.45 km^{2})
  - Water: 0 sq mi (0.00 km^{2})
- Elevation: 1,076 ft (328 m)

Population (2020)
  - Total: 323
  - Estimate (2021): 325
  - Density: 1,900/sq mi (720/km^{2})
- Time zone: UTC-6 (Central (CST))
  - Summer (DST): UTC-5 (CDT)
- ZIP code: 68329
- Area code: 402
- FIPS code: 31-10390
- GNIS feature ID: 2398621

Cook is a village in Johnson County, Nebraska, United States. The population was 323 at the 2020 census.

== History ==
Cook was founded in 1888 when the Missouri Pacific Railroad was extended to that point. It was named for Andrew Cook, the original owner of the town site.

== Geography ==
According to the United States Census Bureau, the village has a total area of 0.17 square miles (0.44 km^{2}), all land.

== Demographics ==
Historical population
Census	Pop.	Note	%±
1900	278		—
1910	387		39.2%
1920	360		−7.0%
1930	354		−1.7%
1940	305		−13.8%
1950	332		8.9%
1960	313		−5.7%
1970	328		4.8%
1980	341		4.0%
1990	333		−2.3%
2000	322		−3.3%
2010	321		−0.3%
2020	319		−0.6%
2021 (est.)	325	▲	1.9%
U.S. Decennial Census

=== 2010 census ===
At the 2010 census, 2010, there were 321 people, 145 households and 89 families residing in the village. The population density was 1,888.2 inhabitants per square mile (729.0/km^{2}). There were 169 housing units at an average density of 994.1 per square mile (383.8/km^{2}). The racial makeup of the village was 95.0% White, 1.2% Asian, 2.2% from other races, and 1.6% from two or more races. Hispanic or Latino of any race were 3.1% of the population.

There were 145 households, of which 26.9% had children under the age of 18, 47.6% were married couples living together, 10.3% had a female householder with no husband present, 3.4% had a male householder with no wife present, and 38.6% were non-families. 34.5% of all households were made up of individuals, and 13.8% had someone living alone who was 65 years of age or older. The average household size was 2.21 and the average family size was 2.80.

The median age was 44.4 years. 23.7% of residents were under the age of 18; 8.8% were between the ages of 18 and 24; 18.3% were from 25 to 44; 31.1% were from 45 to 64; and 18.1% were 65 years of age or older. The sex makeup of the village was 47.7% male and 52.3% female.

=== 2000 census ===
At the 2000 census, there were 322 people, 159 households and 86 families residing in the village. The population density was 1,854.9 inhabitants per square mile (716.2/km^{2}). There were 175 housing units at an average density of 1,008.1 per square mile (389.2/km^{2}). The racial makeup of the village was 99.38% White, 0.31% Native American, and 0.31% from two or more races. Hispanic or Latino of any race were 1.24% of the population.

There were 159 households, of which 20.8% had children under the age of 18, 47.8% were married couples living together, 5.0% had a female householder with no husband present, and 45.3% were non-families. 42.1% of all households were made up of individuals, and 28.3% had someone living alone who was 65 years of age or older. The average household size was 2.03 and the average family size was 2.80.

18.9% of the population were under the age of 18, 5.6% from 18 to 24, 19.6% from 25 to 44, 24.8% from 45 to 64, and 31.1% who were 65 years of age or older. The median age was 48 years. For every 100 females, there were 76.0 males. For every 100 females age 18 and over, there were 75.2 males.

The median household income was $28,594 and the median family income was $34,545. Males had a median income of $29,750 and females $18,750. The per capita income was $18,204. About 2.2% of families and 6.8% of the population were below the poverty line, including none of those under age 18 and 20.8% of those age 65 or over.

== Education ==
Cook is in Johnson County Central Public Schools.

Cook was formerly in Nemaha Valley Schools. In 2007 Nemaha Valley merged into Johnson County Central Public Schools.
