= Syracuse, Nebraska =

- City
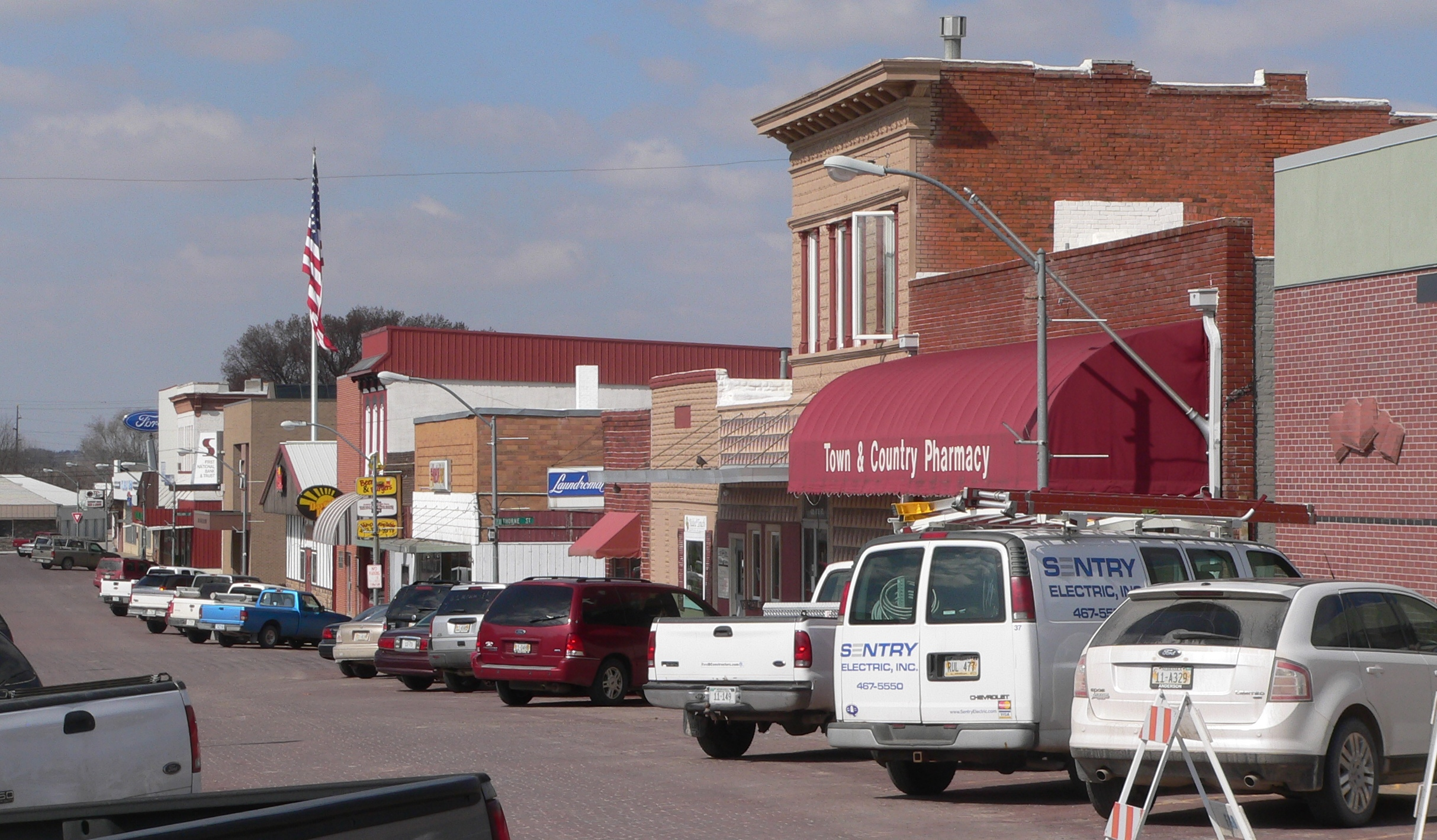
- Downtown Syracuse.

- Location of Syracuse, Nebraska
- Coordinates: 40°39′49″N 96°10′58″W
- Country: United States
- State: Nebraska
- County: Otoe

Area
  - Total: 1.28 sq mi (3.31 km^{2})
  - Land: 1.28 sq mi (3.31 km^{2})
  - Water: 0 sq mi (0.00 km^{2})
- Elevation: 1,066 ft (325 m)

Population (2020)
  - Total: 1,941
  - Density: 1,519.8/sq mi (586.81/km^{2})
- Time zone: UTC-6 (Central (CST))
  - Summer (DST): UTC-5 (CDT)
- ZIP code: 68446
- Area code: 402
- FIPS code: 31-48235
- GNIS feature ID: 2396024
- Website: https://www.syracusene.com/

Syracuse is a city in Otoe County, Nebraska, United States. The population was 1,957 at the 2022 census.

== History ==
Syracuse was laid out in 1869 when it was certain that the railroad would be extended to that point. The community was named after Syracuse, New York.

== Geography ==
According to the United States Census Bureau, the city has a total area of 1.27 square miles (3.29 km^{2}), all land.

=== Climate ===
Climate data for Syracuse, Nebraska (1991–2020, extremes 1893–present)
| Month | Jan | Feb | Mar | Apr | May | Jun | Jul | Aug | Sep | Oct | Nov | Dec | Year |
|---|---|---|---|---|---|---|---|---|---|---|---|---|---|
| Record high °F (°C) | 71 (22) | 83 (28) | 92 (33) | 98 (37) | 106 (41) | 108 (42) | 115 (46) | 116 (47) | 110 (43) | 98 (37) | 84 (29) | 78 (26) | 116 (47) |
| Mean maximum °F (°C) | 58.7 (14.8) | 64.4 (18.0) | 77.6 (25.3) | 85.7 (29.8) | 91.6 (33.1) | 96.0 (35.6) | 99.5 (37.5) | 98.4 (36.9) | 95.1 (35.1) | 87.9 (31.1) | 73.5 (23.1) | 62.1 (16.7) | 100.8 (38.2) |
| Mean daily maximum °F (°C) | 34.4 (1.3) | 39.7 (4.3) | 52.4 (11.3) | 63.9 (17.7) | 74.2 (23.4) | 84.2 (29.0) | 88.2 (31.2) | 86.5 (30.3) | 79.8 (26.6) | 66.9 (19.4) | 51.3 (10.7) | 38.8 (3.8) | 63.4 (17.4) |
| Daily mean °F (°C) | 23.5 (−4.7) | 28.1 (−2.2) | 39.7 (4.3) | 50.7 (10.4) | 62.0 (16.7) | 72.4 (22.4) | 76.4 (24.7) | 74.4 (23.6) | 66.2 (19.0) | 53.4 (11.9) | 39.2 (4.0) | 28.2 (−2.1) | 51.2 (10.7) |
| Mean daily minimum °F (°C) | 12.6 (−10.8) | 16.6 (−8.6) | 27.0 (−2.8) | 37.5 (3.1) | 49.8 (9.9) | 60.6 (15.9) | 64.6 (18.1) | 62.4 (16.9) | 52.6 (11.4) | 39.9 (4.4) | 27.2 (−2.7) | 17.5 (−8.1) | 39.0 (3.9) |
| Mean minimum °F (°C) | −9.2 (−22.9) | −2.6 (−19.2) | 7.0 (−13.9) | 21.3 (−5.9) | 35.4 (1.9) | 48.9 (9.4) | 53.7 (12.1) | 51.3 (10.7) | 36.2 (2.3) | 23.1 (−4.9) | 10.7 (−11.8) | −2.3 (−19.1) | −12.6 (−24.8) |
| Record low °F (°C) | −30 (−34) | −32 (−36) | −22 (−30) | 3 (−16) | 24 (−4) | 38 (3) | 41 (5) | 37 (3) | 22 (−6) | −7 (−22) | −7 (−22) | −33 (−36) | −33 (−36) |
| Average precipitation inches (mm) | 0.78 (20) | 0.98 (25) | 1.82 (46) | 2.76 (70) | 5.63 (143) | 4.55 (116) | 4.24 (108) | 3.48 (88) | 2.87 (73) | 2.54 (65) | 1.45 (37) | 1.11 (28) | 32.21 (818) |
| Average snowfall inches (cm) | 7.7 (20) | 7.3 (19) | 2.4 (6.1) | 1.2 (3.0) | 0.0 (0.0) | 0.0 (0.0) | 0.0 (0.0) | 0.0 (0.0) | 0.0 (0.0) | 0.9 (2.3) | 1.6 (4.1) | 4.4 (11) | 25.5 (65) |
| Average precipitation days (≥ 0.01 in) | 4.5 | 5.1 | 6.9 | 8.5 | 11.3 | 10.1 | 9.2 | 9.2 | 7.5 | 6.9 | 5.0 | 4.7 | 88.9 |
| Average snowy days (≥ 0.1 in) | 4.2 | 3.8 | 1.6 | 0.3 | 0.0 | 0.0 | 0.0 | 0.0 | 0.0 | 0.2 | 1.1 | 3.2 | 14.4 |
Source: NOAA

== Demographics ==
Historical population
| Census | Pop. | Note | %± |
|---|---|---|---|
| 1880 | 510 | | — |
| 1890 | 728 | | 42.7% |
| 1900 | 861 | | 18.3% |
| 1910 | 842 | | −2.2% |
| 1920 | 889 | | 5.6% |
| 1930 | 947 | | 6.5% |
| 1940 | 982 | | 3.7% |
| 1950 | 1,097 | | 11.7% |
| 1960 | 1,261 | | 14.9% |
| 1970 | 1,562 | | 23.9% |
| 1980 | 1,638 | | 4.9% |
| 1990 | 1,646 | | 0.5% |
| 2000 | 1,762 | | 7.0% |
| 2010 | 1,942 | | 10.2% |
| 2020 | 1,941 | | −0.1% |
U.S. Decennial Census; 2013 Estimate

=== 2010 census ===
As of the census of 2010, there were 1,942 people, 845 households, and 515 families living in the city. The population density was 1,529.1 inhabitants per square mile (590.4/km^{2}). There were 903 housing units at an average density of 711.0 per square mile (274.5/km^{2}). The racial makeup of the city was 98.2% White, 0.5% African American, 0.2% Native American, 0.2% Asian, 0.2% from other races, and 0.8% from two or more races. Hispanic or Latino of any race were 0.9% of the population.

There were 845 households, of which 25.6% had children under the age of 18 living with them, 49.9% were married couples living together, 7.8% had a female householder with no husband present, 3.2% had a male householder with no wife present, and 39.1% were non-families. 36.3% of all households were made up of individuals, and 23.1% had someone living alone who was 65 years of age or older. The average household size was 2.21 and the average family size was 2.86.

The median age in the city was 45.5 years. 22.5% of residents were under the age of 18; 5.8% were between the ages of 18 and 24; 21.1% were from 25 to 44; 21.5% were from 45 to 64; and 29.1% were 65 years of age or older. The gender makeup of the city was 45.9% male and 54.1% female.

=== 2000 census ===
As of the census of 2000, there were 1,762 people, 754 households, and 496 families living in the city. The population density was 1,878.7 inhabitants per square mile (725.4/km^{2}). There were 798 housing units at an average density of 850.8 per square mile (328.5/km^{2}). The racial makeup of the city was 98.92% White, 0.06% Native American, 0.17% Asian, 0.51% from other races, and 0.34% from two or more races. Hispanic or Latino of any race were 0.57% of the population.

There were 754 households, out of which 24.8% had children under the age of 18 living with them, 59.0% were married couples living together, 4.9% had a female householder with no husband present, and 34.1% were non-families. 31.0% of all households were made up of individuals, and 22.4% had someone living alone who was 65 years of age or older. The average household size was 2.22 and the average family size was 2.77.

In the city, the population was spread out, with 20.9% under the age of 18, 5.6% from 18 to 24, 22.6% from 25 to 44, 17.6% from 45 to 64, and 33.3% who were 65 years of age or older. The median age was 46 years. For every 100 females, there were 84.1 males. For every 100 females age 18 and over, there were 79.0 males.

As of 2000 the median income for a household in the city was $37,112, and the median income for a family was $48,021. Males had a median income of $31,900 versus $22,413 for females. The per capita income for the city was $18,974. About 3.8% of families and 5.7% of the population were below the poverty line, including 2.9% of those under age 18 and 7.4% of those age 65 or over.
