= Lorton, Nebraska =

- Village
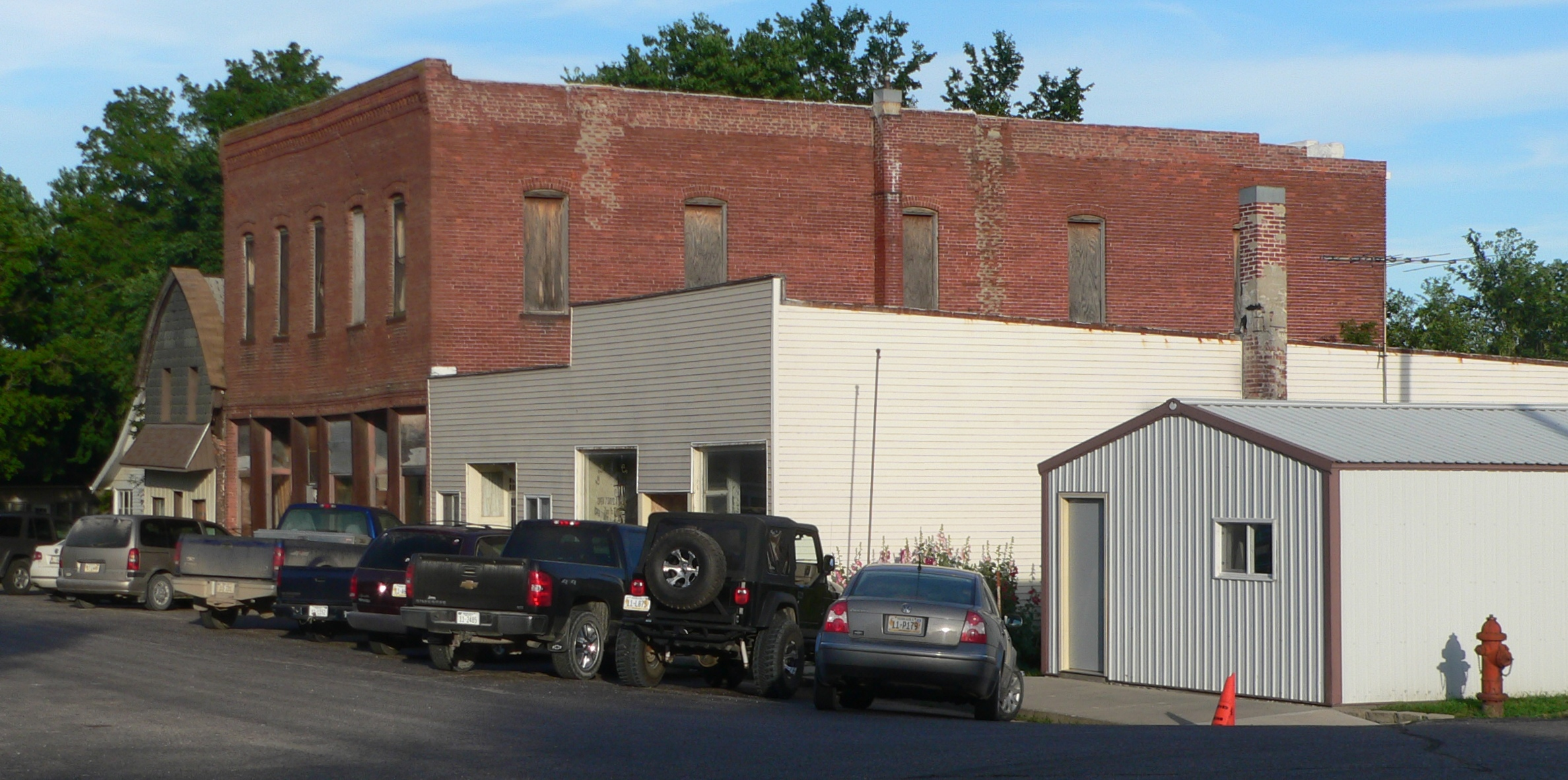
- Downtown Lorton: Cypress Street

- Location of Lorton, Nebraska
- Coordinates: 40°35′50″N 96°01′27″W
- Country: United States
- State: Nebraska
- County: Otoe

Area
  - Total: 0.042 sq mi (0.11 km^{2})
  - Land: 0.042 sq mi (0.11 km^{2})
  - Water: 0 sq mi (0.00 km^{2})
- Elevation: 1,020 ft (310 m)

Population (2020)
  - Total: 35
  - Density: 821.6/sq mi (317.23/km^{2})
- Time zone: UTC-6 (Central (CST))
  - Summer (DST): UTC-5 (CDT)
- ZIP code: 68382
- Area code: 402
- FIPS code: 31-29175
- GNIS feature ID: 2398477

Lorton is a village in Otoe County, Nebraska, United States. The population was 35 at the 2020 census.

== History ==
Lorton was originally called Delta, and under the latter name was platted in 1881. Due to the existence of another station on the railroad named Delta, the town was renamed Lorton in 1892, in order to avoid repetition.

== Geography ==
According to the United States Census Bureau, the village has a total area of 0.04 square miles (0.10 km^{2}), all land.

== Demographics ==
Historical population
Census	Pop.	Note	%±
1910	115		—
1920	102		−11.3%
1930	74		−27.5%
1940	65		−12.2%
1950	75		15.4%
1960	58		−22.7%
1970	47		−19.0%
1980	47		0.0%
1990	61		29.8%
2000	39		−36.1%
2010	41		5.1%
2020	35		−14.6%
U.S. Decennial Census

=== 2010 census ===
As of the census of 2010, there were 41 people, 17 households, and 12 families residing in the village. The population density was 1,025.0 inhabitants per square mile (395.8/km^{2}). There were 20 housing units at an average density of 500.0 per square mile (193.1/km^{2}). The racial makeup of the village was 100.0% White.

There were 17 households, of which 23.5% had children under the age of 18 living with them, 64.7% were married couples living together, 5.9% had a female householder with no husband present, and 29.4% were non-families. 29.4% of all households were made up of individuals, and 11.8% had someone living alone who was 65 years of age or older. The average household size was 2.41 and the average family size was 2.92.

The median age in the village was 50.5 years. 22% of residents were under the age of 18; 2.4% were between the ages of 18 and 24; 19.5% were from 25 to 44; 39% were from 45 to 64; and 17.1% were 65 years of age or older. The gender makeup of the village was 53.7% male and 46.3% female.

=== 2000 census ===
As of the census of 2000, there were 39 people, 18 households, and 10 families residing in the village. The population density was 857.9 inhabitants per square mile (331.2/km^{2}). There were 20 housing units at an average density of 439.9 per square mile (169.8/km^{2}). The racial makeup of the village was 100.00% White.

There were 18 households, out of which 22.2% had children under the age of 18 living with them, 50.0% were married couples living together, and 44.4% were non-families. 38.9% of all households were made up of individuals, and 22.2% had someone living alone who was 65 years of age or older. The average household size was 2.17 and the average family size was 3.00.

In the village, the population was spread out, with 20.5% under the age of 18, 7.7% from 18 to 24, 7.7% from 25 to 44, 46.2% from 45 to 64, and 17.9% who were 65 years of age or older. The median age was 50 years. For every 100 females, there were 69.6 males. For every 100 females age 18 and over, there were 93.8 males.

As of 2000 the median income for a household in the village was $28,750, and the median income for a family was $32,917. Males had a median income of $19,583 versus $26,250 for females. The per capita income for the village was $14,468. There were no families and 9.7% of the population living below the poverty line, including no under eighteens and 42.9% of those over 64.

== Education ==
Lorton is in Johnson County Central Public Schools.

Lorton was formerly in Nemaha Valley Schools. In 2007 Nemaha Valley merged into Johnson County Central Public Schools.
