= Indianola train wreck =

U.S. railway incident in 1911

Details
- Date: May 29, 1911; 7.08 a.m.
- Location: Indianola, Nebraska, Red Willow County, Nebraska, near McCook, Nebraska
- Coordinates: 40.2308°N 100.4259°W
- Country: United States
- Operator: Chicago, Burlington and Quincy Railroad
- Incident type: Head-on collision
- Cause: Missing order to stop

Statistics
- Trains: 2
- Deaths: 18
- Injured: 32

The Indianola Train Wreck (also known as the McCook train wreck) was a railway accident that occurred at 7:08 a.m. on May 29, 1911, on the Chicago, Burlington and Quincy Railroad one half mile west of Indianola, Nebraska leaving 18 dead and 32 injured.

== Accident ==
On the morning of May 29, 1911, train number 12 (pulled by engine 804) of the Chicago, Burlington and Quincy Railroad was eastbound to Chicago after stopping at McCook, Nebraska, to receive orders from the local dispatcher. Train number 9 (pulled by engine 2825) was the westbound Denver Limited which had left Chicago the previous day, May 28, and was due in Denver midday on May 29. Both trains were to meet at Red Willow, Nebraska, and coordinate passing one another. However, eastbound train number 12 continued past Red Willow and built up speed to approximately 55 mph (90 km/h) heading toward Indianola.

Meanwhile, westbound Denver Limited was approaching Indianola anticipating to stop at the next westbound point (Indianola) and approached at approximately 25 mph (40 km/h). In a dense fog neither train was able to stop in time and at 7:08 a.m. the trains collided head-on approximately one-half mile (0.80 km) west of Indianola, Nebraska. Both locomotives were immediately destroyed and their crews killed. The three forward cars of each train were smashed and every car of the westbound Denver Limited went into a ditch except the last two Pullman sleepers. Several passengers were also killed from escaping steam from the locomotives.

== Investigation and causes ==
An investigation of the accident was performed by the Interstate Commerce Commission (ICC) and a report was generated on October 18, 1912. The direct cause of the accident was that eastbound train number 12 failed to stop at Red Willow as directed in order #19 which read "[Train] number 9 will meet ...No 12 at Red Willow and..No 12 will take siding". Further investigation discovered that order #19 which was intended to be communicated by Dispatcher R.D. Lyon at McCook to Conductor F.W. Rank of train number 12 was never delivered. Neither man, nor the engineer of train number 12 (John N. Hyder) discovered the omission.

The ICC added that the collision could have been avoided if the track had been equipped with an automatic block signal system.

== Victims ==
The following is a list of the eighteen who perished:

- Engineer William T Leahy, Lincoln, NE
- Fireman Albert J. Olson, Lincoln, NE
- Engineer John N. Hyder, Lincoln, NE
- Fireman Walter J. Damron, Lincoln, NE
- Express Messenger George Freer, Omaha, NE
- Express Messenger George Ernest. M. Frazier, Omaha, NE
- Clarence A. Hillsaback, Holdrege, NE
- Robert Shepherd, Holdrege, NE
- T.H. Bowers, McCook, NE
- Harry McCall, Denver, CO
- R.B. Wilson, McCook, NE
- Harry H. Culbertson, Brimfield, IL
- Mrs Harry H. (Mabel DeLong) Culbertson, Brimfield, IL
- F.J. Gateley, Gretna, NE
- A.G. Turano, Palisades, CO
- Hiram J. Feekin, McCook, NE
- Mrs Hiram Feekin, McCook, NE
- Miss Grace Dean, Minden, NE
