= Red Willow County Courthouse =

- U.S. National Register of Historic Places
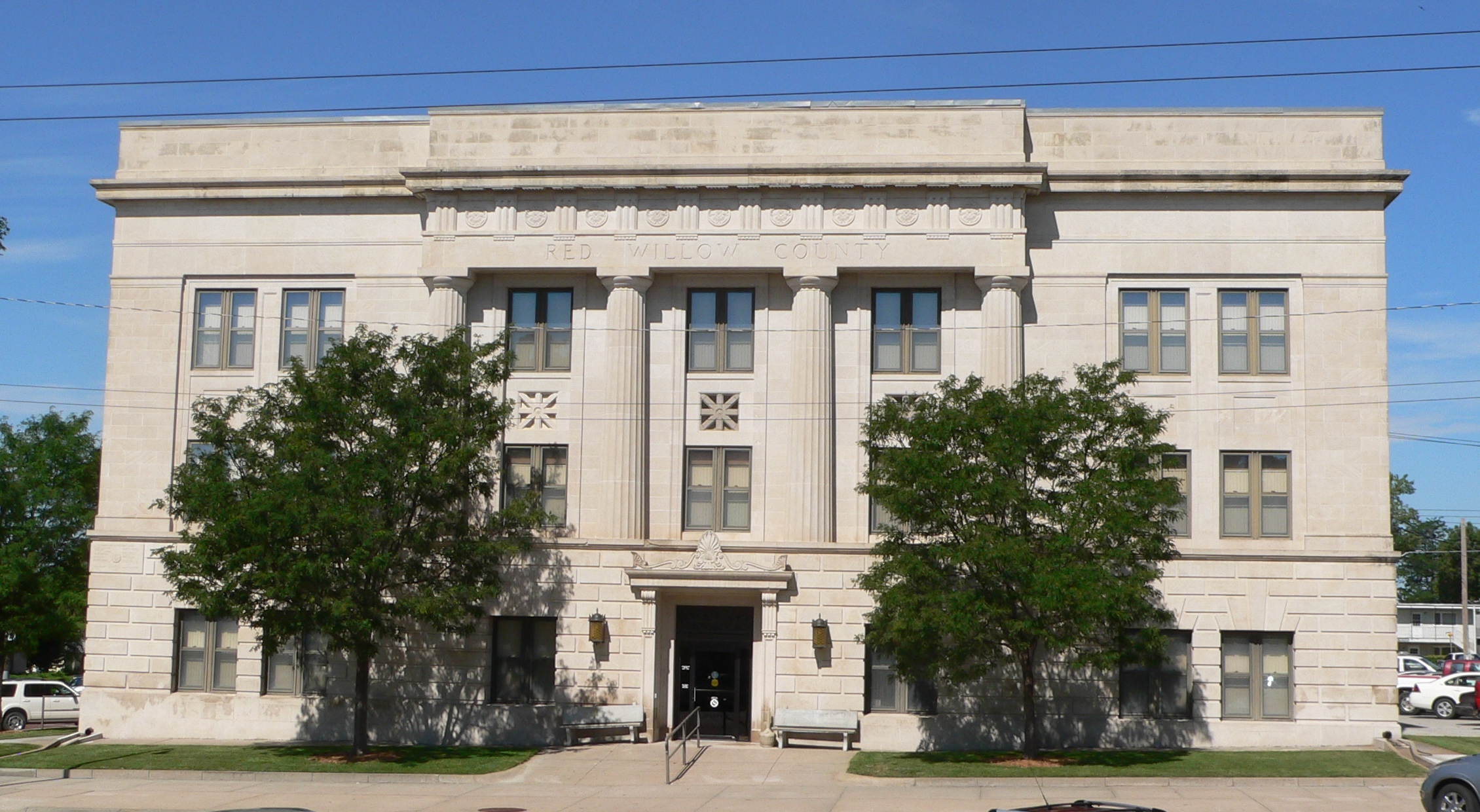
- The courthouse in 2010

- Location within Nebraska Location within the United States
- Location: NW corner Norris Ave. and E. E St., McCook, Nebraska
- Coordinates: 40°12′07″N 100°37′32″W
- Area: less than one acre
- Built: 1926
- Built by: Percy M. Bell
- Architect: Marcus L. Evans
- Architectural style: Classical Revival
- MPS: County Courthouses of Nebraska MPS
- NRHP reference No.: 90000966
- Added to NRHP: July 5, 1990

The Red Willow County Courthouse is a historic building in McCook, Nebraska, which serves as the courthouse of Red Willow County, Nebraska. Two prior county courthouses were built in Indianola, Nebraska, in 1873 and 1880, followed by a third one in McCook, built in 1896. The current courthouse was built in 1926. It was designed by architect Marcus L. Evans in the Classical Revival style, with "symmetric arrangement, monumental proportions, smooth stone surface, prominent columns, unadorned parapet, rusticated and ashlar finish, and such classical elements as acroteria, fluted Doric columns, rosettes, and triglyphs." It has been listed on the National Register of Historic Places since July 5, 1990.
