= National Register of Historic Places listings in Red Willow County, Nebraska =

Location of Red Willow County in Nebraska

Red Willow County, Nebraska, United States, has 10 properties and districts listed on the National Register of Historic Places, including one National Historic Landmark.

The locations of National Register properties and districts for which the latitude and longitude coordinates are included below may be seen in a map.

This National Park Service list is complete through NPS recent listings posted October 30, 2026.

== Current listings ==
	Name on the Register	Image	Date listed	Location	City or town	Description
1	Bartley Sales Barn	Bartley Sales Barn	June 25, 2018 (#100001356)	Southwestern corner of the junction of U.S. Routes 6/34 and Commercial St. 40°15′03″N 100°18′22″W	Bartley	
2	Camp Indianola		November 12, 2019 (#100004609)	Address Restricted	Indianola vicinity	
3	Doyle Archeological Site		December 4, 1974 (#74001138)	Address Restricted	McCook	
4	Keystone Hotel	Keystone Hotel	July 5, 2001 (#01000710)	402 Norris Ave. 40°12′21″N 100°37′55″W	McCook	
5	McCook Public-Carnegie Library	McCook Public-Carnegie Library	September 12, 1985 (#85002142)	423 Norris Ave. 40°12′05″N 100°37′31″W	McCook	
6	McCook YMCA	McCook YMCA	March 9, 2000 (#00000167)	424 Norris Ave. 40°12′06″N 100°37′33″W	McCook	
7	Senator George William Norris House	Senator George William Norris House	May 28, 1967 (#67000006)	706 Norris Ave. 40°12′15″N 100°37′32″W	McCook	
8	Red Willow County Courthouse	Red Willow County Courthouse	July 5, 1990 (#90000966)	Northwestern corner of Norris Ave. and East E St. 40°12′07″N 100°37′32″W	McCook	part of the County Courthouses of Nebraska Multiple Property Submission
9	Second-Generation Norden Bombsight Vault	Second-Generation Norden Bombsight Vault	June 17, 1993 (#93000534)	Off U.S. Route 83 northwest of McCook at the former McCook Army Air Base; 40°18′29″N 100°42′13″W	McCook	Norden bombsight vaults are part of the Significant Relic Components of US Army Air Fields in Nebraska Multiple Property Submission
10	H.P. Sutton House	H.P. Sutton House	May 22, 1978 (#78001708)	602 Norris Ave. 40°12′11″N 100°37′32″W	McCook	

== See also ==
- List of National Historic Landmarks in Nebraska
- National Register of Historic Places listings in Nebraska
