= McCook YMCA =

- U.S. National Register of Historic Places
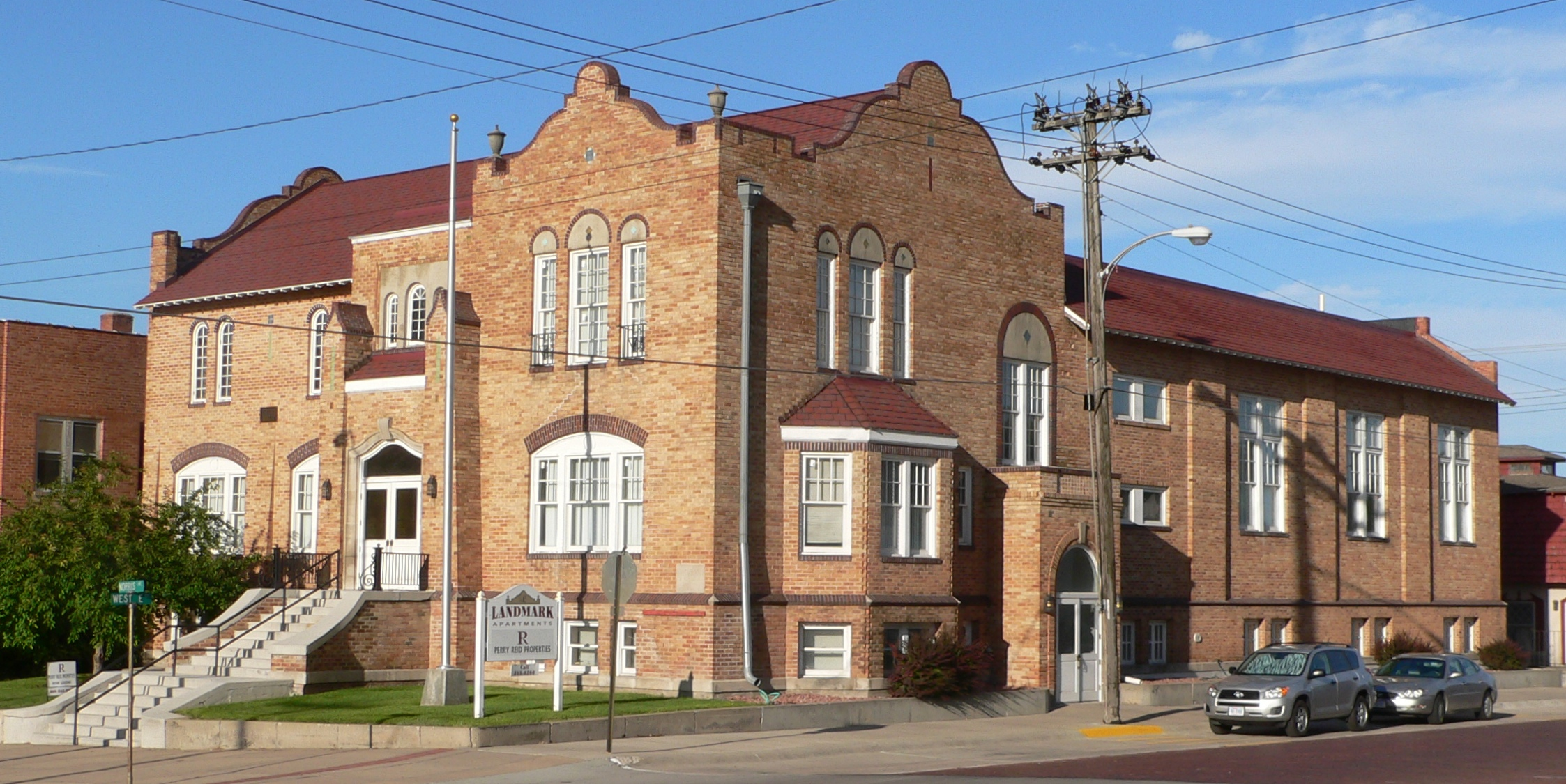
- The building in 2010

- Location within Nebraska Location within the United States
- Location: 424 Norris Avenue, McCook, Nebraska
- Coordinates: 40°12′06″N 100°37′33″W
- Area: less than one acre
- Built: 1925
- Built by: Swanson & Sudik
- Architect: William N. Bowman
- Architectural style: Mission Revival
- NRHP reference No.: 00000167
- Added to NRHP: March 9, 2000

The McCook YMCA is a historic building in McCook, Nebraska. It was built in 1925 by Swanson & Sudik for the YMCA, and designed in the Mission Revival style by architect William N. Bowman. It housed McCook Junior College from 1926 to 1936. Groups like the American Red Cross and the Church of Jesus Christ of Latter-day Saints held meetings here. It has been listed on the National Register of Historic Places since March 9, 2000.
