= Keystone Hotel (McCook, Nebraska) =

- U.S. National Register of Historic Places
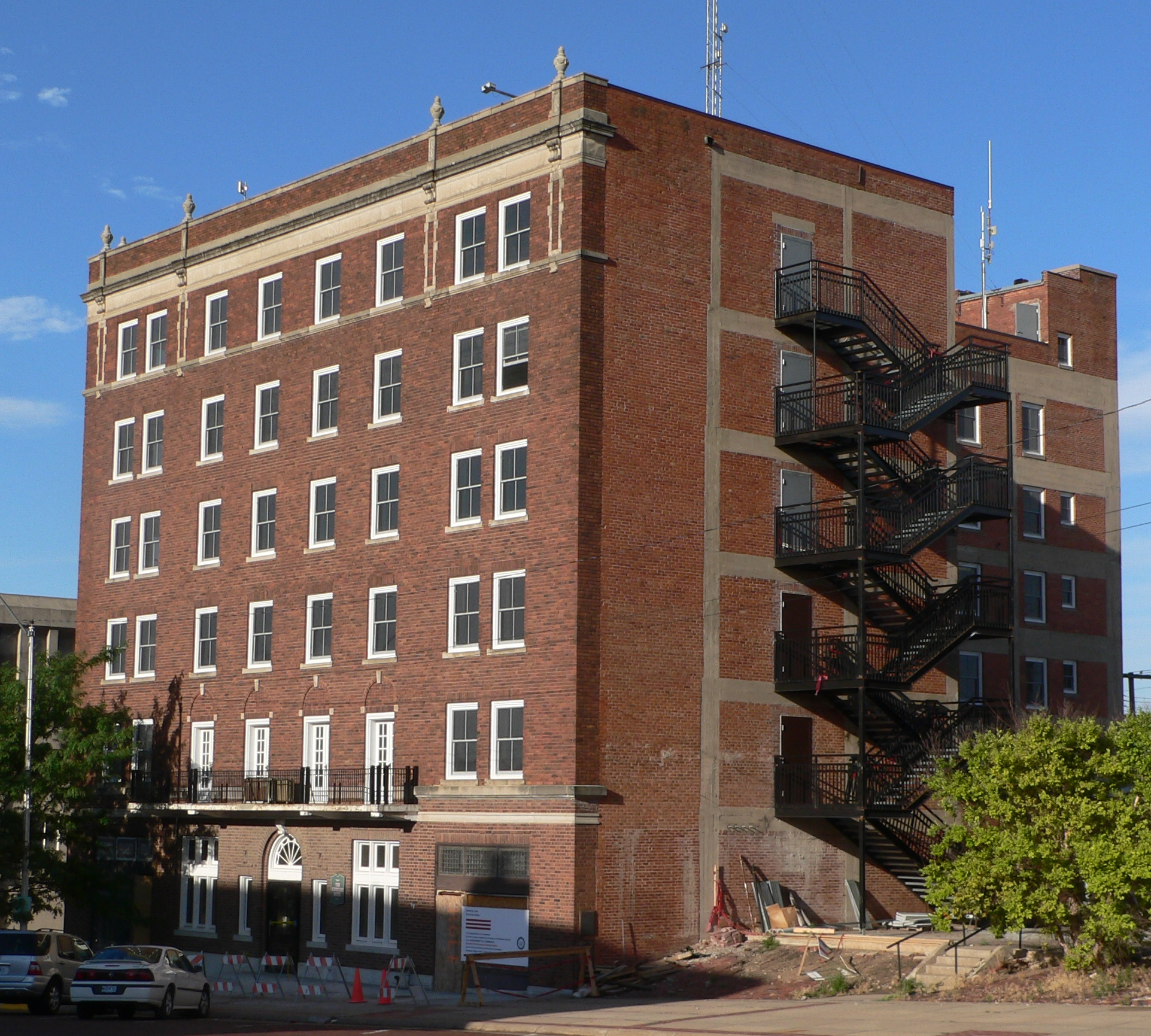
- The building in 2010

- Location within Nebraska Location within the United States
- Location: 402 Norris Avenue, McCook, Nebraska
- Coordinates: 40°12′21″N 100°37′55″W
- Area: less than one acre
- Built: 1922
- Architect: Archer and Gloyd
- Architectural style: Renaissance Revival
- NRHP reference No.: 01000710
- Added to NRHP: July 5, 2001

The Keystone Hotel is a historic hotel building in McCook, Nebraska. It was built as a hotel in 1922, and it was remodelled as a retirement facility in 1970. It was designed in the Renaissance Revival style by Archer and Gloyd, an architectural firm based in Kansas City, Missouri. It has been listed on the National Register of Historic Places since July 5, 2001.
