= McCook Public-Carnegie Library =

- U.S. National Register of Historic Places
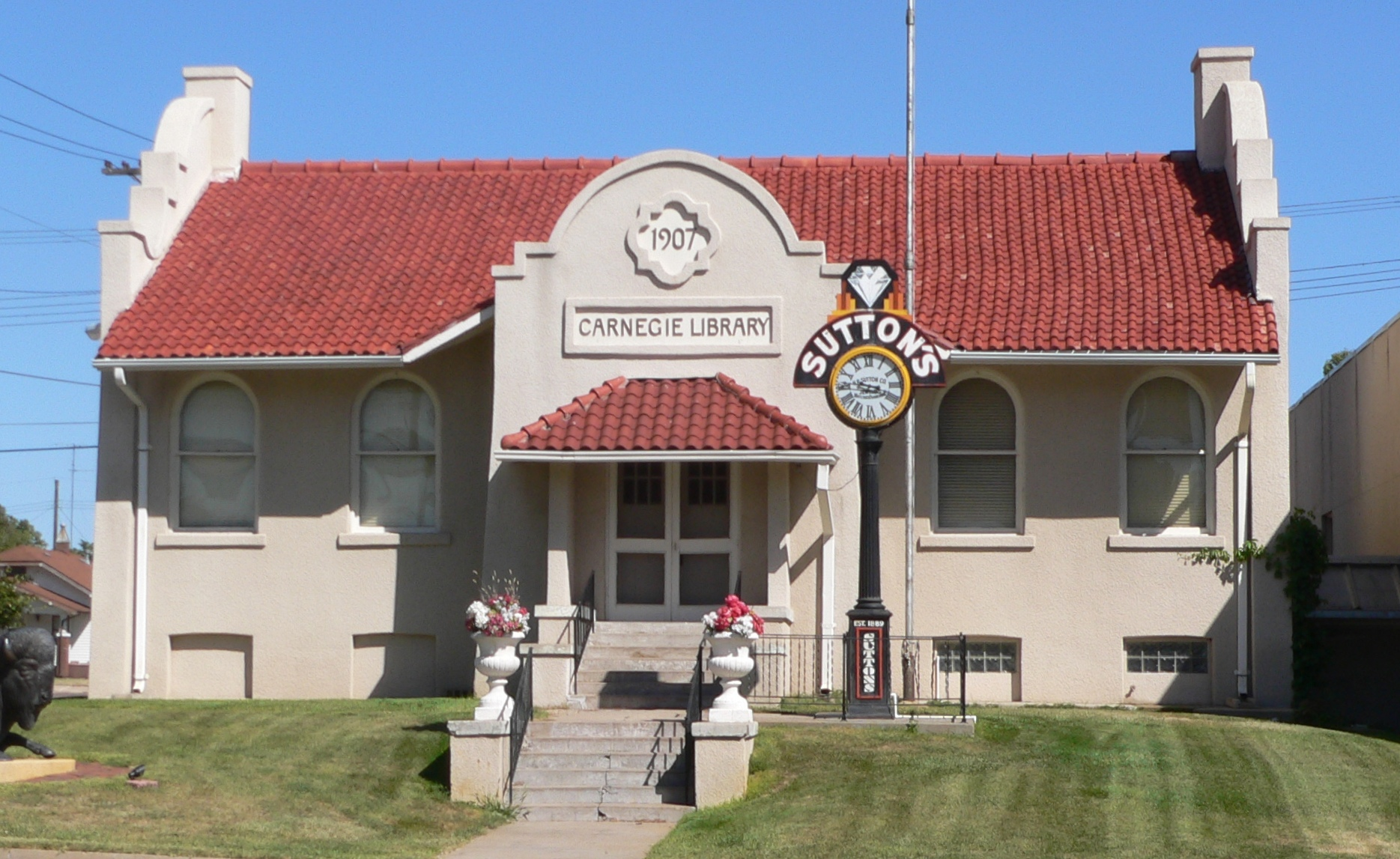
- The library in 2010

- Location within Nebraska Location within the United States
- Location: 423 Norris Avenue, McCook, Nebraska
- Coordinates: 40°12′05″N 100°37′31″W
- Area: less than one acre
- Built: 1905
- Architect: Willis Marean
- Architectural style: Spanish Colonial Revival
- NRHP reference No.: 85002142
- Added to NRHP: September 12, 1985

The McCook Public-Carnegie Library, also known as the McCook Carnegie Library, is a historic building in McCook, Nebraska, United States. It was built as a Carnegie library in 1905, and designed in the Spanish Colonial Revival style by Denver architect Willis Marean. It housed the McCook public library until 1969. Since then, it has housed the Museum of the High Plains. The building has been listed on the National Register of Historic Places since September 12, 1985.

== See also ==
- National Register of Historic Places listings in Red Willow County, Nebraska
