= Marion, Nebraska =

Unincorporated community in Red Willow County, Nebraska, United States

- Unincorporated community
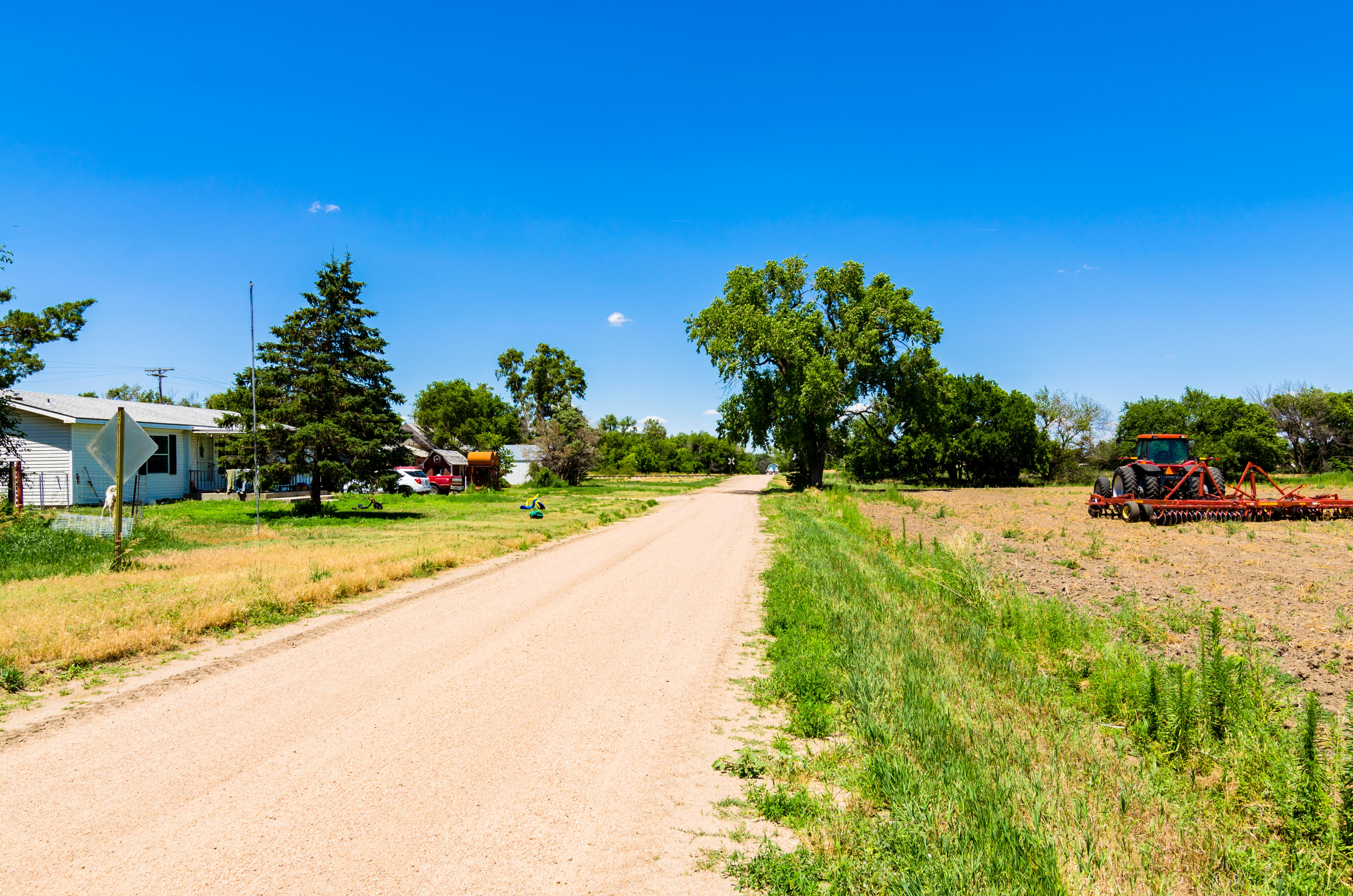
- Marion, July 2017

- Location within Nebraska
- Coordinates: 40°00′57″N 100°28′50″W
- Country: United States
- State: Nebraska
- County: Red Willow
- Elevation: 2,500 ft (760 m)
- Time zone: UTC-6 (Central (CST))
  - Summer (DST): UTC-5 (CDT)
- ZIP code: 69026
- Area code: 308
- GNIS feature ID: 831056

Marion is an unincorporated community in Red Willow County, Nebraska, United States, near the Kansas state line.

== History ==
Marion was platted in 1901. The community was named for Marion Powell, a landowner.

A post office was established at Marion in 1902, and remained in operation until it was discontinued in 1953.
