= George W. Norris House =

Historic house in Nebraska, United States

- U.S. National Register of Historic Places
- U.S. National Historic Landmark
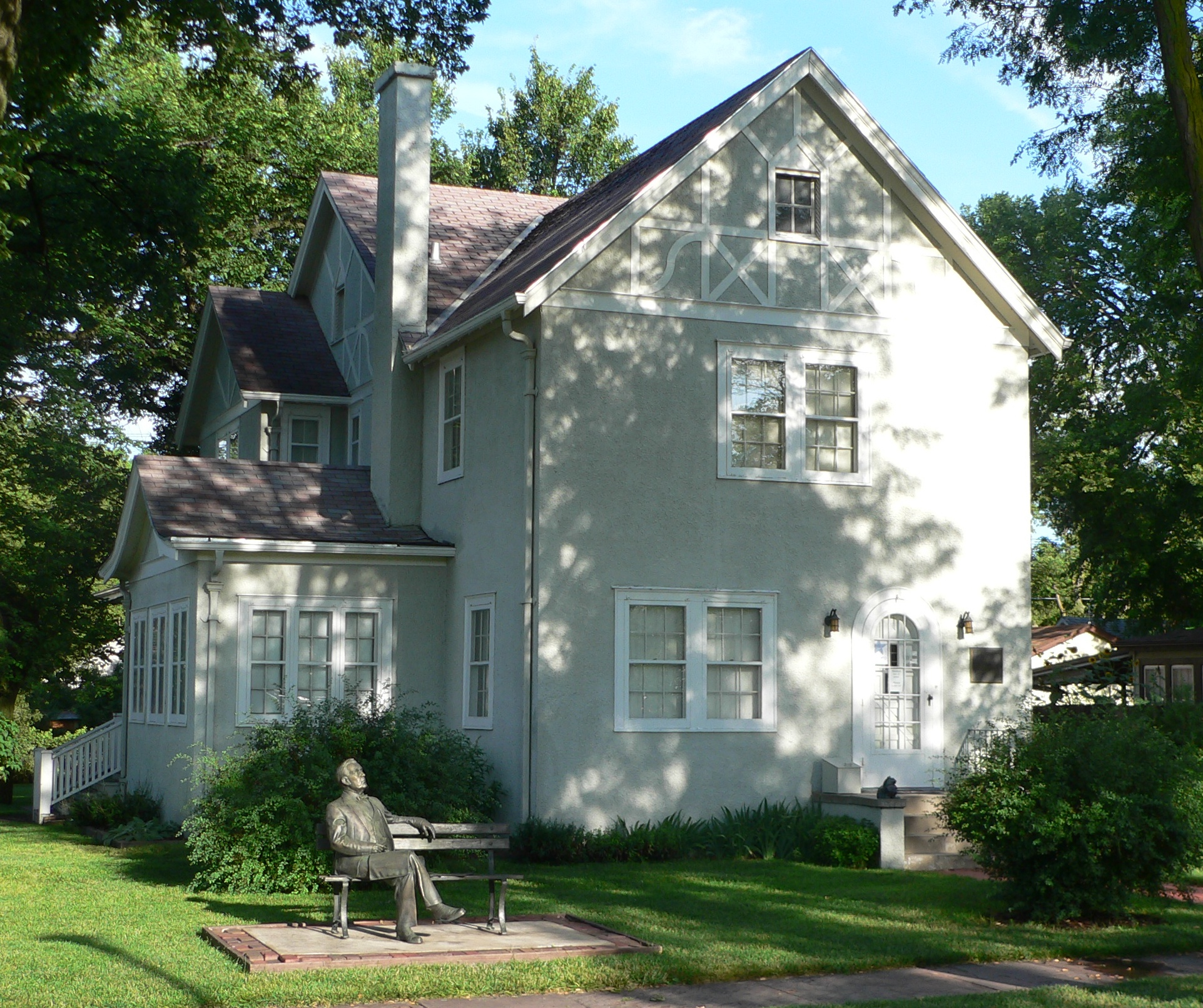
- George Norris House, seen from the southeast. At lower left is a seated statue of Norris.

- Location within Nebraska Location within the United States
- Location: 706 Norris Ave., McCook, Nebraska
- Coordinates: 40°12′15″N 100°37′32″W
- Built: 1899
- NRHP reference No.: 67000006

Significant dates
- Added to NRHP: May 28, 1967
- Designated NHL: May 28, 1967

The Senator George William Norris House is a historic house museum at 706 Norris Avenue in McCook, Nebraska. It was purchased in 1899 by George W. Norris (1862–1944), a Nebraska politician who championed the New Deal of the 1930s and the Rural Electrification Act. It was donated to the Nebraska State Historical Society in 1968 by his wife, and was designated a National Historic Landmark in 1967.

== Description and history ==
The Norris House stands north of downtown McCook, on the west side of Norris Avenue opposite Norris Park, a small public park. The house is 2 1/2 stories in height, built out of wood with a stucco exterior and covered by a gabled roof. It is basically rectangular in shape, with shallow two-story gabled projects on either side, and a single-story gabled sunroom on the south side. Gable ends are finished in stucco like the main body, but also have applied Stick style decorative elements. The front entrance is in the rightmost of three bays, in a round-arch opening. The interior is furnished and finished mainly with items belonging to the Norris family.

The house was purchased in 1899 by Norris, who was then early in his political career. He served five terms in the United States House of Representatives and five as a United States senator, and was an advocate of progressive Republican policies. He supported creation of the Tennessee Valley Authority (whose first dam bears his name), and was a major proponent of the Rural Electrification Act, which helped bring electricity to large parts of the country.

Norris died in 1944; his wife gave the property to the state historical society in 1968.

== See also ==
- List of National Historic Landmarks in Nebraska
- National Register of Historic Places listings in Red Willow County, Nebraska
