= Lebanon, Nebraska =

Village in Red Willow County, Nebraska, United States

- Village
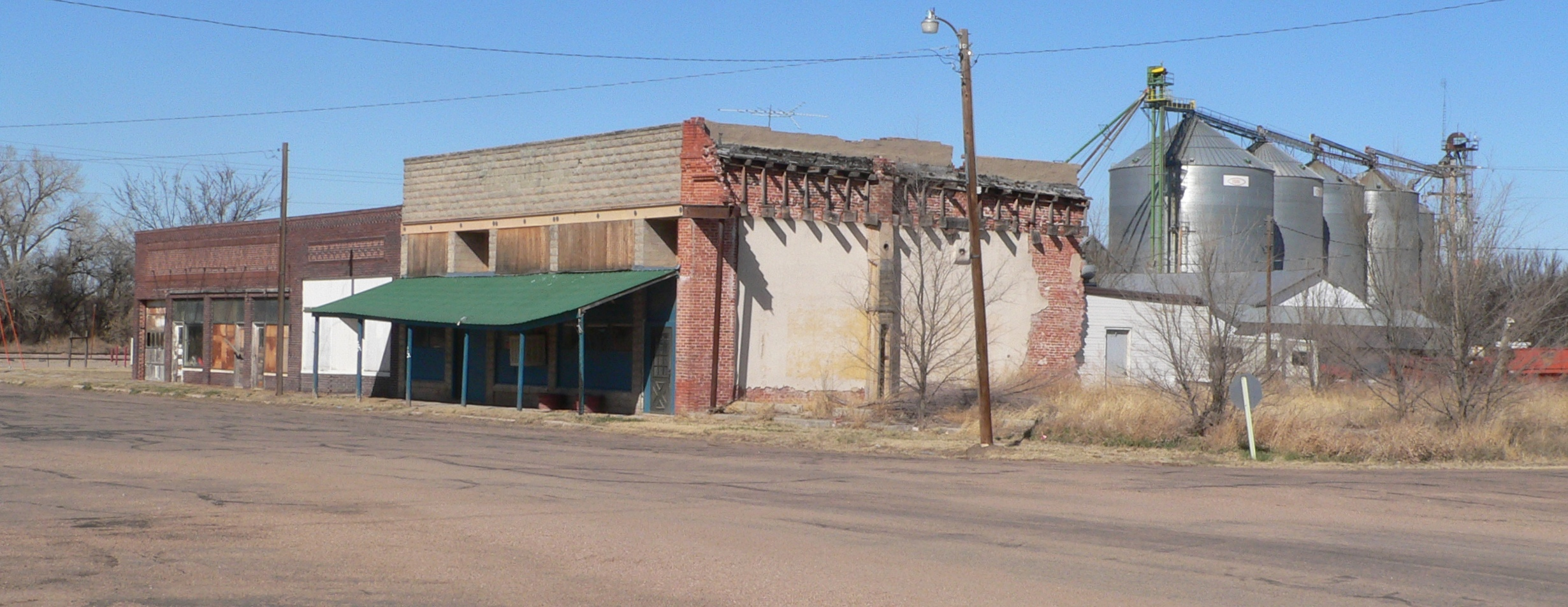
- Downtown Lebanon, March 2011

- Location of Lebanon, Nebraska
- Coordinates: 40°02′56″N 100°16′33″W
- Country: United States
- State: Nebraska
- County: Red Willow

Area
  - Total: 0.16 sq mi (0.42 km^{2})
  - Land: 0.16 sq mi (0.42 km^{2})
  - Water: 0 sq mi (0.00 km^{2})
- Elevation: 2,408 ft (734 m)

Population (2020)
  - Total: 46
  - Density: 286.0/sq mi (110.44/km^{2})
- Time zone: UTC-6 (Central (CST))
  - Summer (DST): UTC-5 (CDT)
- ZIP code: 69036
- Area code: 308
- FIPS code: 31-26455
- GNIS feature ID: 2398409

Lebanon is a village in Red Willow County, Nebraska, United States. As of the 2020 census, Lebanon had a population of 46.

== History ==
Lebanon was platted in 1887 when the Burlington & Missouri River Railroad was extended to that point. Its name commemorates the Cedars of Lebanon.

In April 1955 Charles Harris, a delegate chosen by the Mayor of Lebanon, was part of a delegation of forty mayors of American cities called "Lebanon" which was invited to the Middle East by the government of the country Lebanon. The mayor of Lebanon in 1955 was Chester Keith, who couldn't go due to his age. When visiting Jerusalem, then partitioned between Israel and Jordan, Harris accidentally crossed the border and was shot to death by a Jordanian soldier. At the time, his death sparked a major international incident, with the UN launching an investigation, Israel and Jordan each putting the blame on the other.

== Geography ==
According to the United States Census Bureau, the village has a total area of 0.16 square miles (0.41 km^{2}), all land.

== Demographics ==
Historical population
Census	Pop.	Note	%±
1910	197		—
1920	245		24.4%
1930	262		6.9%
1940	238		−9.2%
1950	213		−10.5%
1960	143		−32.9%
1970	118		−17.5%
1980	102		−13.6%
1990	75		−26.5%
2000	70		−6.7%
2010	80		14.3%
2020	46		−42.5%
U.S. Decennial Census

=== 2010 census ===
As of the census of 2010, there were 80 people, 33 households, and 21 families residing in the village. The population density was 500.0 inhabitants per square mile (193.1/km^{2}). There were 50 housing units at an average density of 312.5 per square mile (120.7/km^{2}). The racial makeup of the village was 100.0% White.

There were 33 households, of which 36.4% had children under the age of 18 living with them, 51.5% were married couples living together, 3.0% had a female householder with no husband present, 9.1% had a male householder with no wife present, and 36.4% were non-families. 27.3% of all households were made up of individuals, and 9.1% had someone living alone who was 65 years of age or older. The average household size was 2.42 and the average family size was 2.90.

The median age in the village was 36.5 years. 26.2% of residents were under the age of 18; 11.4% were between the ages of 18 and 24; 20.1% were from 25 to 44; 31.3% were from 45 to 64; and 11.3% were 65 years of age or older. The gender makeup of the village was 56.3% male and 43.8% female.

=== 2000 census ===
As of the census of 2000, there were 70 people, 34 households, and 21 families residing in the village. The population density was 436.5 inhabitants per square mile (168.5/km^{2}). There were 48 housing units at an average density of 299.3 per square mile (115.6/km^{2}). The racial makeup of the village was 100.00% White.

There were 34 households, out of which 20.6% had children under the age of 18 living with them, 58.8% were married couples living together, and 35.3% were non-families. 35.3% of all households were made up of individuals, and 26.5% had someone living alone who was 65 years of age or older. The average household size was 2.06 and the average family size was 2.59.

In the village, the population was spread out, with 20.0% under the age of 18, 7.1% from 18 to 24, 21.4% from 25 to 44, 24.3% from 45 to 64, and 27.1% who were 65 years of age or older. The median age was 47 years. For every 100 females, there were 100.0 males. For every 100 females age 18 and over, there were 100.0 males.

As of 2000 the median income for a household in the village was $19,688, and the median income for a family was $30,833. Males had a median income of $33,750 versus $8,125 for females. The per capita income for the village was $15,406. There were 16.7% of families and 25.9% of the population living below the poverty line, including 55.0% of under eighteens and none of those over 64.

== See also ==
- List of municipalities in Nebraska
