= Shippee, Nebraska =

Unincorporated community in Nebraska, U.S.

Coordinates: 40°03′33″N 100°12′08″W

Shippee is an unincorporated community in Red Willow County, Nebraska, United States.

== History ==
A post office was established at Shippee in 1913, and remained in operation until it was discontinued in 1933. The community was named for Leonard Shippee, a local landowner.
