= Perry, Nebraska =

Village in Nebraska, U.S.

Coordinates: 40°12′37″N 100°43′23″W

Perry is a village in Red Willow County, Nebraska, United States.

== History ==
Perry was originally called Campbell, and under the latter name was established when the railroad was extended to that point.
