= Red Willow Creek =

Location
- Country: United States
- State: Nebraska
- Villages: Wallace, Nebraska, Red Willow, Nebraska

Physical characteristics
- Mouth: Republican River
  - location: Red Willow, Nebraska
  - coordinates: 40°13′21″N 100°29′13″W
  - elevation: 730 m (2,400 ft)
- Basin size: 783 mi^{2} (2,030 km^{2})
- Discharge
  - location: mouth

The Red Willow Creek is a 126-mile-long (203 km) tributary of the Republican River in Nebraska. The name is reported to be a mistranslation of the Dakota Indian name Chanshasha Wakpala, which literally means Red Dogwood Creek. The Dakota referred to the creek as such because of an abundance of the red dogwood shrub that grew along the banks. Its stem and branches are deep red in color, and it is favored in basket making.

== See also ==
- List of rivers of Nebraska
