= Red Willow County, Nebraska =

County in Nebraska, United States

- County
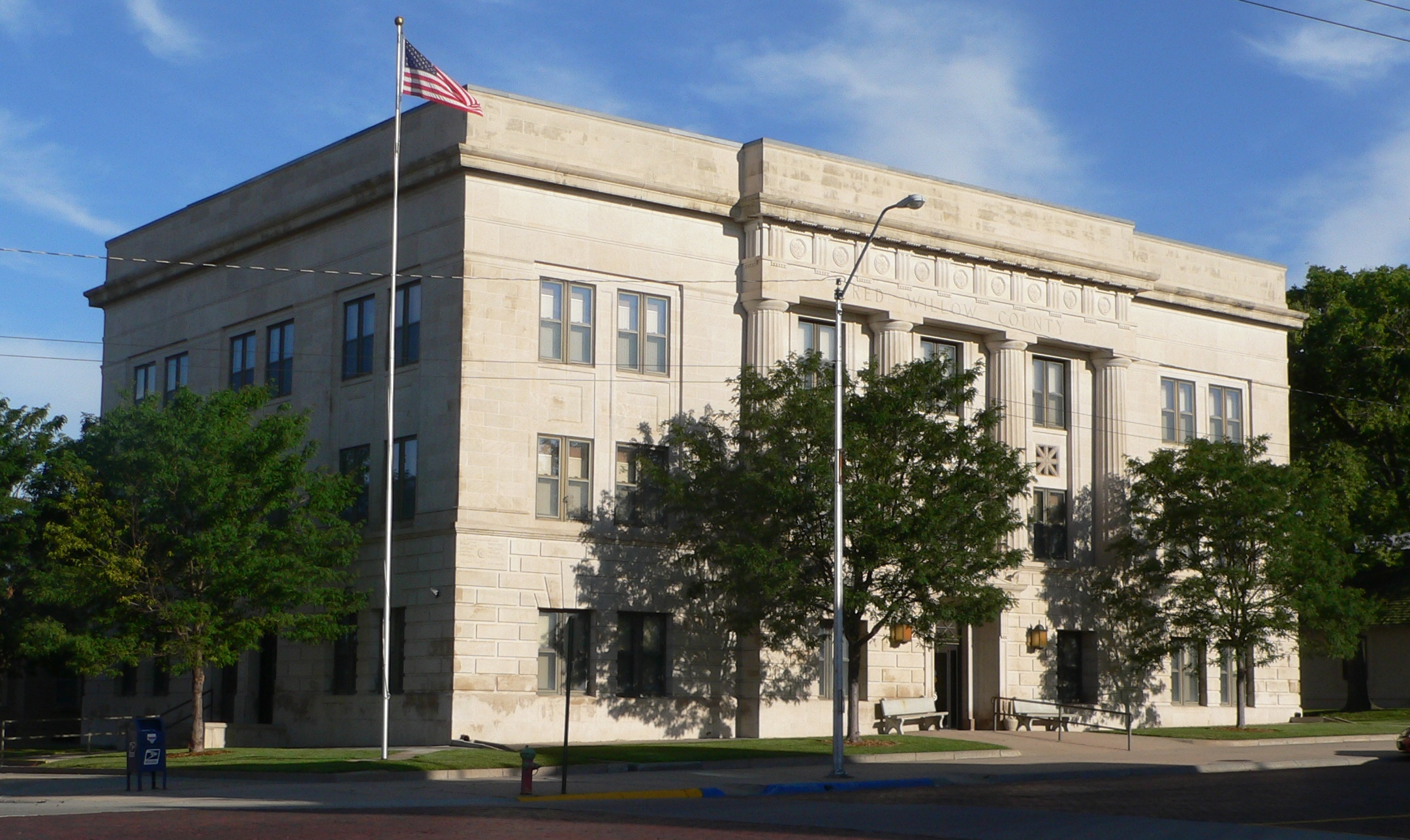
- Red Willow County Courthouse in McCook

- Location within the U.S. state of Nebraska
- Coordinates: 40°11′N 100°29′W
- Country: United States
- State: Nebraska
- Founded: 1873
- Named for: Red Willow Creek
- Seat: McCook
- Largest city: McCook

Area
  - Total: 718 sq mi (1,860 km^{2})
  - Land: 717 sq mi (1,860 km^{2})
  - Water: 1.0 sq mi (2.6 km^{2}) 0.1%

Population (2020)
  - Total: 10,702
  - Estimate (2025): 10,307 ▼
  - Density: 14.9/sq mi (5.76/km^{2})
- Time zone: UTC−6 (Central)
  - Summer (DST): UTC−5 (CDT)
- Congressional district: 3rd
- Website: redwillowcountyne.gov

Red Willow County is a county located in the U.S. state of Nebraska. As of the 2020 United States census, the population was 10,702. Its county seat is McCook. In the Nebraska license plate system, Red Willow County is represented by the prefix 48 (it had the forty-eighth-largest number of vehicles registered in the county when the license plate system was established in 1922).

== History ==
Red Willow County was formed in 1873. It was named for the Red Willow Creek. The name is reported to be a mistranslation of the Dakota Indian name Chanshasha Wakpala, which literally means Red Dogwood Creek. The Dakota referred to the creek thus due to red dogwood shrubs that grew along the creek banks. Its stem and branches are deep red in color, and it is favored in basket making.

== Geography ==
Red Willow County lies on the south line of Nebraska. The south boundary line of Red Willow County abuts the north boundary line of the state of Kansas. The Republican River runs easterly through the north-central part of the county. The county terrain consists of rolling hills, sloping to the east. The portions of the terrain in the drainage basins are used for agriculture. The county has a total area of 718 square miles (1,860 km^{2}), of which 717 square miles (1,860 km^{2}) is land and 1.0 square mile (2.6 km^{2}) (0.1%) is water.

=== Major highways ===
- U.S. Highway 6
- U.S. Highway 34
- U.S. Highway 83
- Nebraska Highway 89

=== Transit ===
- Amtrak California Zephyr (McCook station)

=== Adjacent counties ===
- Furnas County – east
- Decatur County, Kansas – south
- Rawlins County, Kansas – southwest
- Hitchcock County – west
- Frontier County – north

=== Protected areas ===
- Red Willow Reservoir State Wildlife Management Area (part)

== Demographics ==
Historical population
Census	Pop.	Note	%±
1880	3,044		—
1890	8,837		190.3%
1900	9,604		8.7%
1910	11,056		15.1%
1920	11,434		3.4%
1930	13,859		21.2%
1940	11,951		−13.8%
1950	12,977		8.6%
1960	12,940		−0.3%
1970	12,191		−5.8%
1980	12,615		3.5%
1990	11,705		−7.2%
2000	11,448		−2.2%
2010	11,055		−3.4%
2020	10,702		−3.2%
2025 (est.)	10,307	▼	−3.7%
US Decennial Census; 1790-1960 1900-1990; 1990-2000 2010-2013

=== 2020 census ===
As of the 2020 census, the county had a population of 10,702. The median age was 41.2 years. 22.5% of residents were under the age of 18 and 21.4% of residents were 65 years of age or older. For every 100 females there were 102.1 males, and for every 100 females age 18 and over there were 100.9 males age 18 and over.

The racial makeup of the county was 91.0% White, 1.1% Black or African American, 0.5% American Indian and Alaska Native, 0.4% Asian, 0.1% Native Hawaiian and Pacific Islander, 3.0% from some other race, and 4.1% from two or more races. Hispanic or Latino residents of any race comprised 6.4% of the population.

69.1% of residents lived in urban areas, while 30.9% lived in rural areas.

There were 4,532 households in the county, of which 27.1% had children under the age of 18 living with them and 24.9% had a female householder with no spouse or partner present. About 32.2% of all households were made up of individuals and 15.5% had someone living alone who was 65 years of age or older.

There were 5,157 housing units, of which 12.1% were vacant. Among occupied housing units, 71.8% were owner-occupied and 28.2% were renter-occupied. The homeowner vacancy rate was 2.1% and the rental vacancy rate was 10.3%.

=== 2000 census ===
As of the 2000 United States census, there were 11,448 people, 4,710 households, and 3,188 families in the county. The population density was 16 people per square mile (6.2 people/km^{2}). There were 5,278 housing units at an average density of 7 units per square mile (2.7/km^{2}). The racial makeup of the county was 97.55% White, 0.16% Black or African American, 0.38% Native American, 0.17% Asian, 0.02% Pacific Islander, 0.93% from other races, and 0.80% from two or more races. 2.45% of the population were Hispanic or Latino of any race.

There were 4,710 households, out of which 30.20% had children under the age of 18 living with them, 57.50% were married couples living together, 7.20% had a female householder with no husband present, and 32.30% were non-families. 28.60% of all households were made up of individuals, and 13.50% had someone living alone who was 65 years of age or older. The average household size was 2.37 and the average family size was 2.92.

In the county, the population was spread out, with 24.90% under the age of 18, 8.80% from 18 to 24, 24.60% from 25 to 44, 22.60% from 45 to 64, and 19.00% who were 65 years of age or older. The median age was 40 years. For every 100 females there were 93.90 males. For every 100 females age 18 and over, there were 91.30 males.

The median income for a household in the county was $32,293, and the median income for a family was $40,279. Males had a median income of $27,768 versus $18,768 for females. The per capita income for the county was $16,303. About 7.60% of families and 9.60% of the population were below the poverty line, including 11.40% of those under age 18 and 7.60% of those age 65 or over.

== Communities ==
=== Cities ===
- Indianola
- McCook (county seat)

=== Villages ===
- Bartley
- Danbury
- Lebanon

=== Unincorporated communities ===
- Marion
- Perry
- Shippee

== Politics ==
Red Willow County voters have been reliably Republican for several decades. In no national election since 1936 has the county selected the Democratic Party candidate (as of 2024), and only five total from 1900 to the present.

United States presidential election results for Red Willow County, Nebraska
Year	Republican		Democratic		Third party(ies)	
Year	No.	%	No.	%	No.	%
1900	1,192	55.26%	905	41.96%	60	2.78%
1904	1,373	66.30%	306	14.78%	392	18.93%
1908	1,242	46.17%	1,317	48.96%	131	4.87%
1912	256	11.76%	923	42.40%	998	45.84%
1916	977	38.03%	1,418	55.20%	174	6.77%
1920	1,993	58.88%	1,133	33.47%	259	7.65%
1924	1,931	44.61%	1,122	25.92%	1,276	29.48%
1928	3,559	66.10%	1,770	32.88%	55	1.02%
1932	1,972	35.26%	3,479	62.21%	141	2.52%
1936	2,078	36.51%	3,445	60.52%	169	2.97%
1940	3,119	55.70%	2,481	44.30%	0	0.00%
1944	3,107	59.31%	2,132	40.69%	0	0.00%
1948	2,610	53.84%	2,238	46.16%	0	0.00%
1952	4,433	73.10%	1,631	26.90%	0	0.00%
1956	3,806	70.08%	1,625	29.92%	0	0.00%
1960	3,890	66.93%	1,922	33.07%	0	0.00%
1964	2,740	53.14%	2,416	46.86%	0	0.00%
1968	3,066	67.02%	1,145	25.03%	364	7.96%
1972	3,701	79.90%	931	20.10%	0	0.00%
1976	2,978	61.91%	1,722	35.80%	110	2.29%
1980	4,050	76.73%	899	17.03%	329	6.23%
1984	4,131	79.69%	1,026	19.79%	27	0.52%
1988	3,331	68.19%	1,511	30.93%	43	0.88%
1992	2,500	46.80%	1,166	21.83%	1,676	31.37%
1996	3,112	62.10%	1,365	27.24%	534	10.66%
2000	3,680	73.23%	1,188	23.64%	157	3.12%
2004	4,129	78.53%	1,055	20.06%	74	1.41%
2008	3,735	74.05%	1,216	24.11%	93	1.84%
2012	3,891	78.83%	952	19.29%	93	1.88%
2016	4,258	82.28%	645	12.46%	272	5.26%
2020	4,525	82.72%	811	14.83%	134	2.45%
2024	4,457	83.48%	815	15.27%	67	1.25%

== See also ==
- National Register of Historic Places listings in Red Willow County, Nebraska
