= Harvey P. Sutton House =

Historic house in Nebraska, United States

- H.P. Sutton House
- U.S. National Register of Historic Places
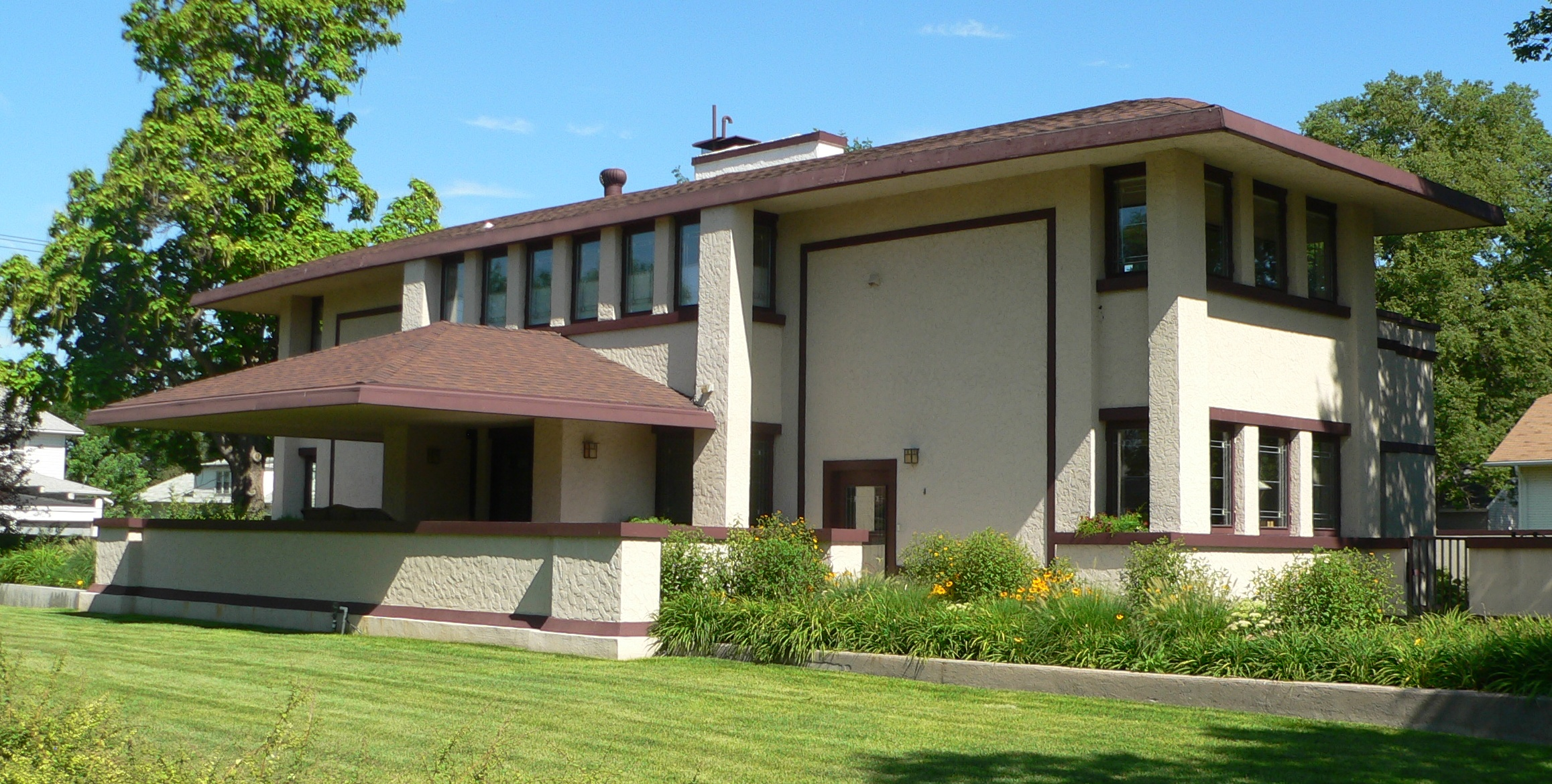
- H.P. Sutton House, seen from the southeast

- Location within Nebraska
- Location: 602 Norris Avenue; McCook, Nebraska
- Coordinates: 40°12′10.66″N 100°37′34″W
- Built: 1905-1908
- Architect: Frank Lloyd Wright
- Architectural style: Prairie School
- NRHP reference No.: 78001708
- Added to NRHP: May 22, 1978

The Harvey P. Sutton House, also known as the H.P. Sutton House, is a six-bedroom, 4,000-square-foot (370 m^{2}) Frank Lloyd Wright designed Prairie School home at 602 Norris Avenue in McCook, Nebraska. Although the house is known by her husband's name, Eliza Sutton was the driving force behind the commissioning of Wright for the design in 1905–1907 and the construction of the house in 1907–1908.

== History ==
=== Context ===
Harvey P. Sutton was born in Naples, New York on July 17, 1860, the son of Joel C. and Sarah (Robinson) Sutton. Educated in Michigan, he became a successful musician in Chicago, but suffered such poor health that he decided he needed to leave. Flipping a coin to determine whether to travel east or west, he moved to Ainsworth in north central Nebraska. There he courted Elizabeth B. "Eliza" Munson, and married her on August 4, 1886. Harvey had left Chicago not long before Frank Lloyd Wright arrived in that burgeoning metropolis, yet 20 years later he and Eliza would become Wright's clients.

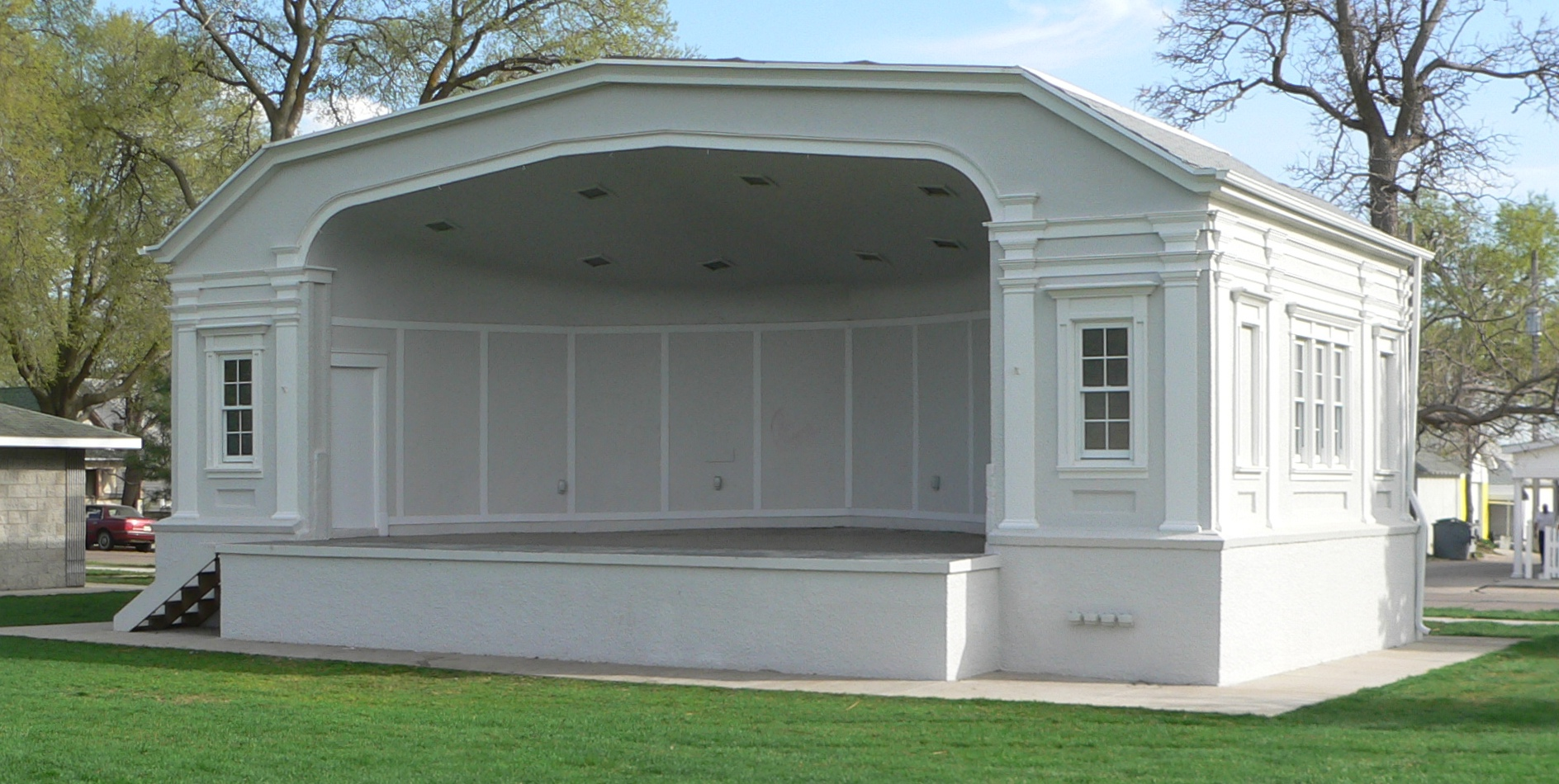
Harvey P. Sutton conducted the well-known C.B.& Q. Railroad Concert Band at venues throughout the region, including what is now called Norris Park near Sutton's house.

The Suttons relocated to McCook in southern Nebraska in 1889, soon after their son Harold was born. Part of the lure of McCook was an opportunity for Harvey to lead the prestigious C.B.& Q. Railroad Concert Band, headquartered there but known throughout the state. The Pawnee Native Americans who had previously occupied the land had been forced to give up the Republican River valley in 1833, but McCook was not founded on its banks until 1882 when the railroad came through. The choice of McCook as a major point on the railroad, and as the headquarters of the concert band, were both due to its being midway from Omaha to Denver.

Mr. Sutton led the band from 1889 to 1924, but although he enjoyed his musical career, he needed to earn more money. He followed the example of his brother, Benjamin, who had previously established a successful jewelry business in Dexter, Michigan. Harvey prospered as McCook's only jewelry store proprietor, later taking his son Harold into the business as his partner in 1908.

=== Construction ===
The couple acquired a small house seven blocks north of the railroad on the hill overlooking downtown, at what was then known as 602 Main Street. They eventually decided that the house needed to be enlarged. Rather than hiring an informal remodeling job, the Suttons opted to pursue Frank Lloyd Wright as their architect. The connection to Wright was through Eliza's friends, Rose Barnes and Mary S. Marlan. Barnes saw the two designs of Wright's published in the Ladies Home Journal in 1901, and showed them to Marlan, who had grown up in Wisconsin and known Wright.

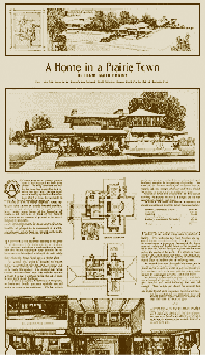
February 1901 design by Frank Lloyd Wright, one of two that year in the Ladies' Home Journal seen by Rose Barnes, a friend of Eliza Sutton.

The 1901 Ladies' Home Journal designs were influential and have become famous. "A Home in a Prairie Town" was published in February, followed by "A Small House with Lots of Room in It" in July. These were part of a series of designs sponsored by Journal editor Edward W. Bok in a crusade to update US housing designs to better fit the way families were living. Bok was looking for a simplified, functional house, and required designs he published to replace the fussy parlor with a living room, to include at least one bathroom, improved ventilation, and no "senseless ornament". Architectural historian Gwendolyn Wright observes that the publication of these two articles "provided the first opportunity for Frank Lloyd Wright to show his alchemy, converting a simple programme into architectural gold.... The [first] design contains virtually every revolutionary theme he would employ for the next two decades."

Writer Grant Manson notes that, although these two Ladies' Home Journal designs were "accorded the widest publicity then possible" and were subsequently to exercise lasting influence on residential design, they resulted in no commissions for Wright, "with one exception, the Sutton house at McCook, Nebraska."

Mrs. Rose Barnes and her husband Charles were the first to contact Wright, but Eliza was also interested. Donald Morgan states that in 1903, Charles traveled by train to see Wright in his Oak Park Studio, accompanied by Mrs. Sutton. By 1905, Wright had produced plans for Charles and Rose. Eliza was impressed with these plans, and not only wrote Wright on her own behalf, but also informed Wright that the Barnes had decided not to pursue building.

Mrs. Sutton began her several years of corresponding with Wright in his Oak Park Studio, asking him to design an enlargement for the Suttons' existing house for no more than $2000. Besides Wright, she corresponded with many of those working in the Oak Park Studio, including Walter Burley Griffin, William Drummond, Barry Byrne, Isabel Roberts, and A.C. Tobin (brother of Wright's wife, Catherine). With the exception of Tobin, all would go on to independent careers as Prairie School architects.

Eliza Sutton repeatedly and pointedly asked Wright to be economical. She rejected two plans that incorporated portions of their existing home as not having enough space yet being too expensive, and finally abandoned the idea of salvaging any of the previous house. Eliza eventually agreed to a third design that included all of the six bedrooms she had insisted on from the beginning, making it one of the largest houses in McCook. Wright estimated it would cost $5,000, yet the Suttons ultimately paid $10,000 and were furious. The experience of going well over budget was one shared by most of Wright's clients. Grant Manson puts it kindly when he observes that "Wright's genius was never at home in the realm of the merely economical". More bluntly, Paul Sprague states that "Wright either misrepresented the true cost of his designs, or else simply was unable to ascertain their real cost in advance of construction." Sprague doubts that it was deliberate, and concludes that, although Wright routinely blamed contractors and workers for the over-runs, he was in fact a victim of his approach to architecture. "Even when Wright tried to design simply and inexpensively the artist in him refused to cooperate."

=== Subsequent history ===
The Suttons altered the house during their tenure. Eliza Sutton seriously considered adding a library to the house in 1924, but ultimately decided against it. The house suffered a fire in 1932. Of unknown origin, it started in the basement and destroyed the original veranda roof and caused extensive damage to many of the original furnishings. Unable to determine how the highly cantilevered roof had been anchored in the house, local builders changed its location and proportions and added large plastered columns to support its extension. Later, during World War II, the Suttons added stairs up to the balcony in the northeast corner above the main floor bedroom, added a downstairs bathroom, and made alterations to the second floor in order to house Army Air Corps personnel from the nearby air base who needed temporary quarters.

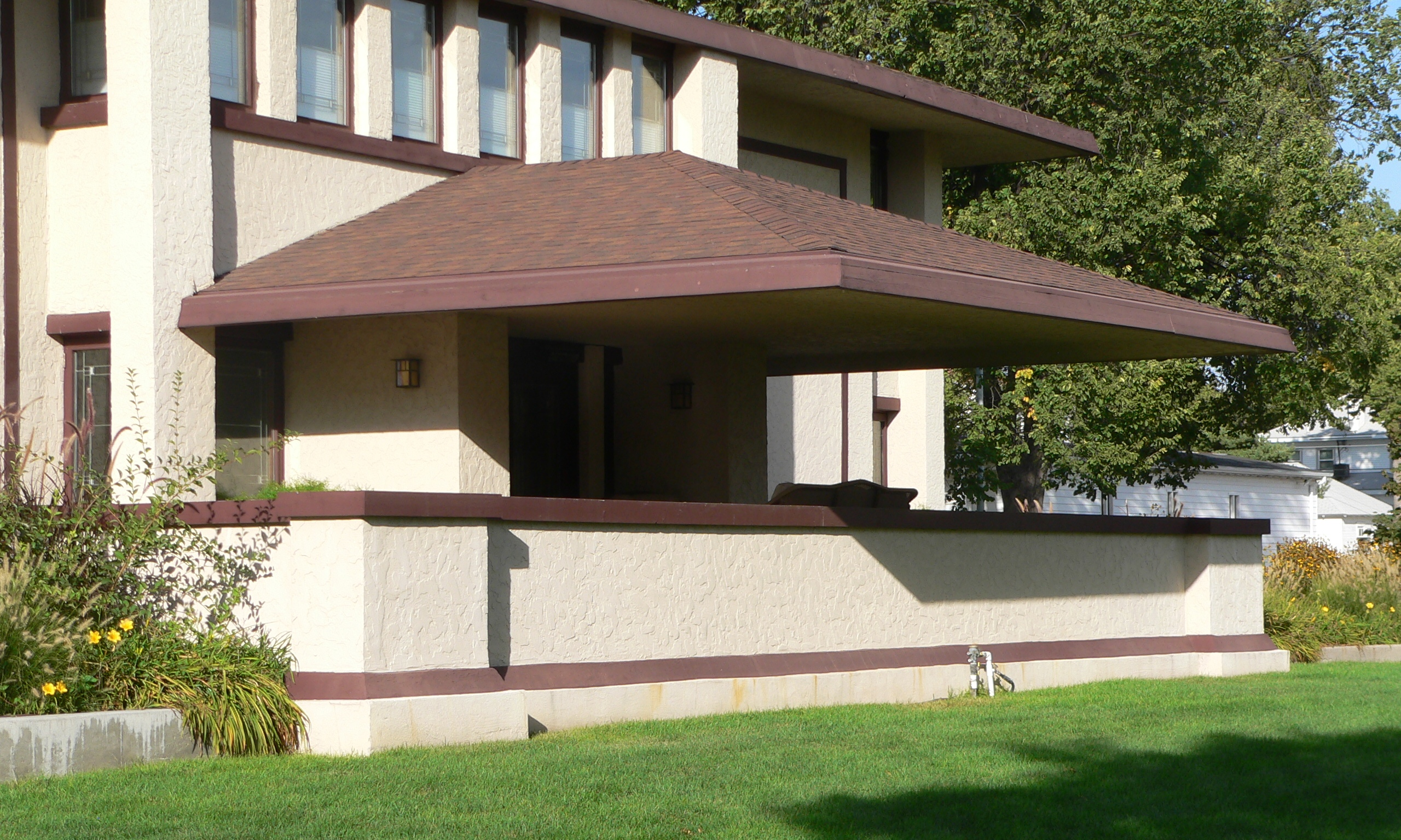
Now restored, Frank Lloyd Wright's original boldly cantilevered veranda roof was destroyed by fire in 1932 and poorly repaired.

Harvey and Eliza Sutton died in 1952, and in 1960 Dr. J. Harold Donaldson purchased the house. Donaldson converted the structure into his medical clinic, making numerous further alterations counter to Wright's design. These included constructing a small brick addition on the north (rear) side for use as a diagnostic clinic, replacing the original roof with asphalt shingles, and blocking the original entrance into the reception room, using instead the previously private veranda door into what had been the living room. Donaldson also erected a wall of decorative concrete block around the entire property that incorporated lily pools, fish ponds, statues, and fountains featuring cherubs pouring water from vases. However, the changes that were most damaging to the historical fabric of the house involved filling in doors, cutting through oak floors, and adding walls to divide the flowing, interconnected interior into 24 small rooms.

Although Donaldson applied for the house to be placed on the National Register of Historic Places, the fate of the house was uncertain when he retired in 1978. At first, Donaldson tried to sell it by auction, but there were no takers. Facing ongoing upkeep and taxes, Donaldson looked into moving it to Lincoln or Omaha, where tourist interest might be stronger. As a last resort, he considered tearing it down and replacing it with an apartment building.

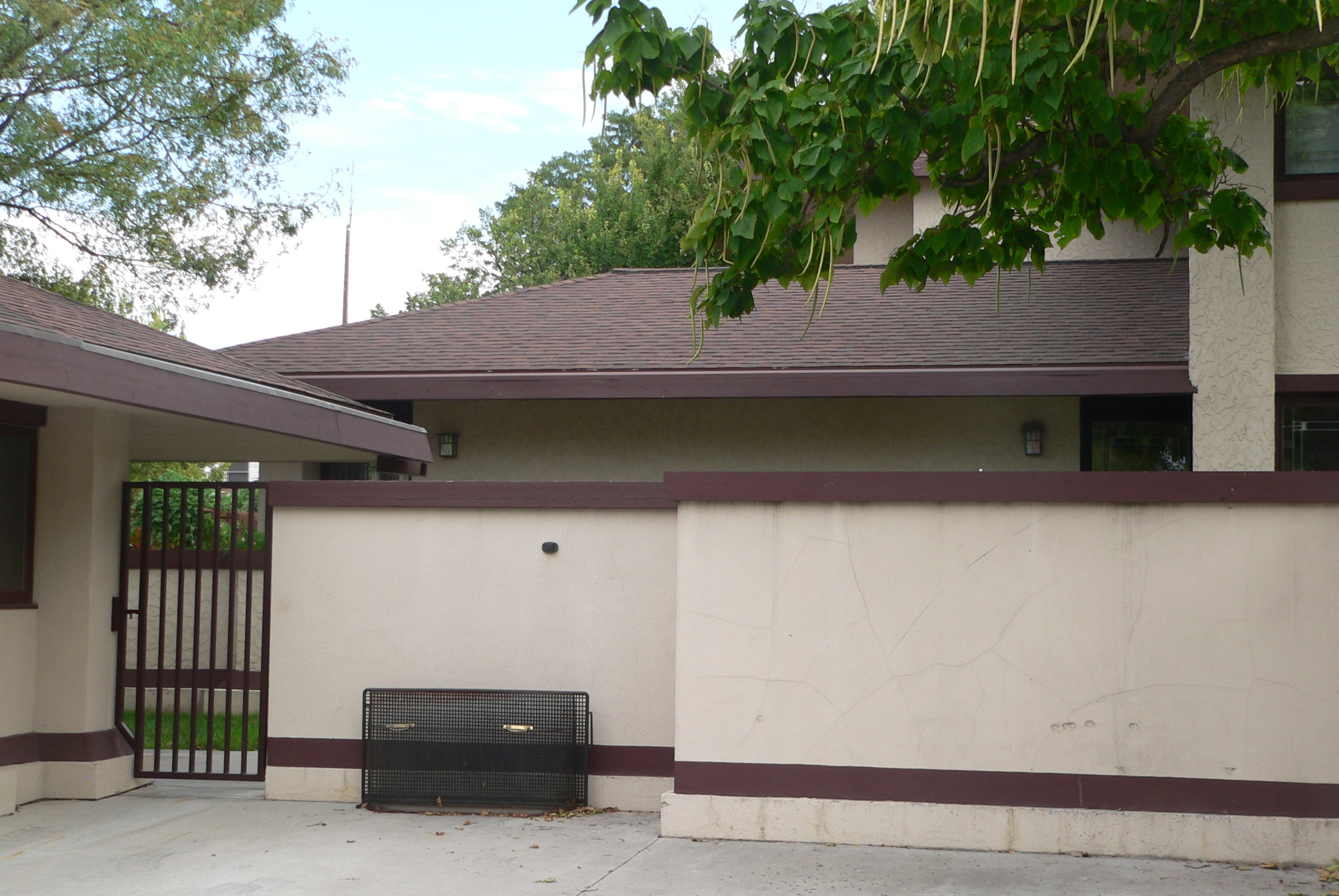
In 2001, Janet and Van Korrell added this non-Wright but sympathetic addition in the previously open northwest corner of the cruciform house. The garage to the left is also not original.

In 1978, the house was added to the National Register; in the same week, it was purchased by Mary and Donald Poore. Along with their son, they set about restoring what they could, working on it for a year before moving in. Finding most of the original art glass windows, they cleaned, regrouted, and re-installed them. They removed the perimeter wall and the extra interior walls, but lacked the funds to restore the cantilevered veranda, restore the floors, or recreate the original ground-level entry. After living in the house for about ten years, the Poores sold the residence to John and Stacy Cannon, who lived in it a further four years.

Janet and Van Korrell purchased the house when the Cannons left in 1992. Janet had been fascinated with the Wright-designed house for some time, and they quickly tore down the enclosed staircase that the Suttons had added 50 years earlier to get up to the balcony on the back. Determined to restore it as fully as possible, in 1999 they hired John G. Thorpe to oversee the work. Thorpe, a Wright expert, restoration architect, and one of the founders of the Frank Lloyd Wright Trust in Oak Park, Illinois, worked with the original plans and old photos on a complete restoration inside and out, including the Wright-designed cupboards, the ground-level entry, and the daring cantilevered veranda roof. As part of this work, the Korrells elected to build an addition in the previously open northwest corner, balancing the original northeast corner bedroom, but moving away from Wright's cruciform design. This addition incorporates a modern laundry and a second stairway to the basement.

== Architecture ==
The house as built is a classic Prairie Style design, consisting of a two-story frame and stucco dwelling.

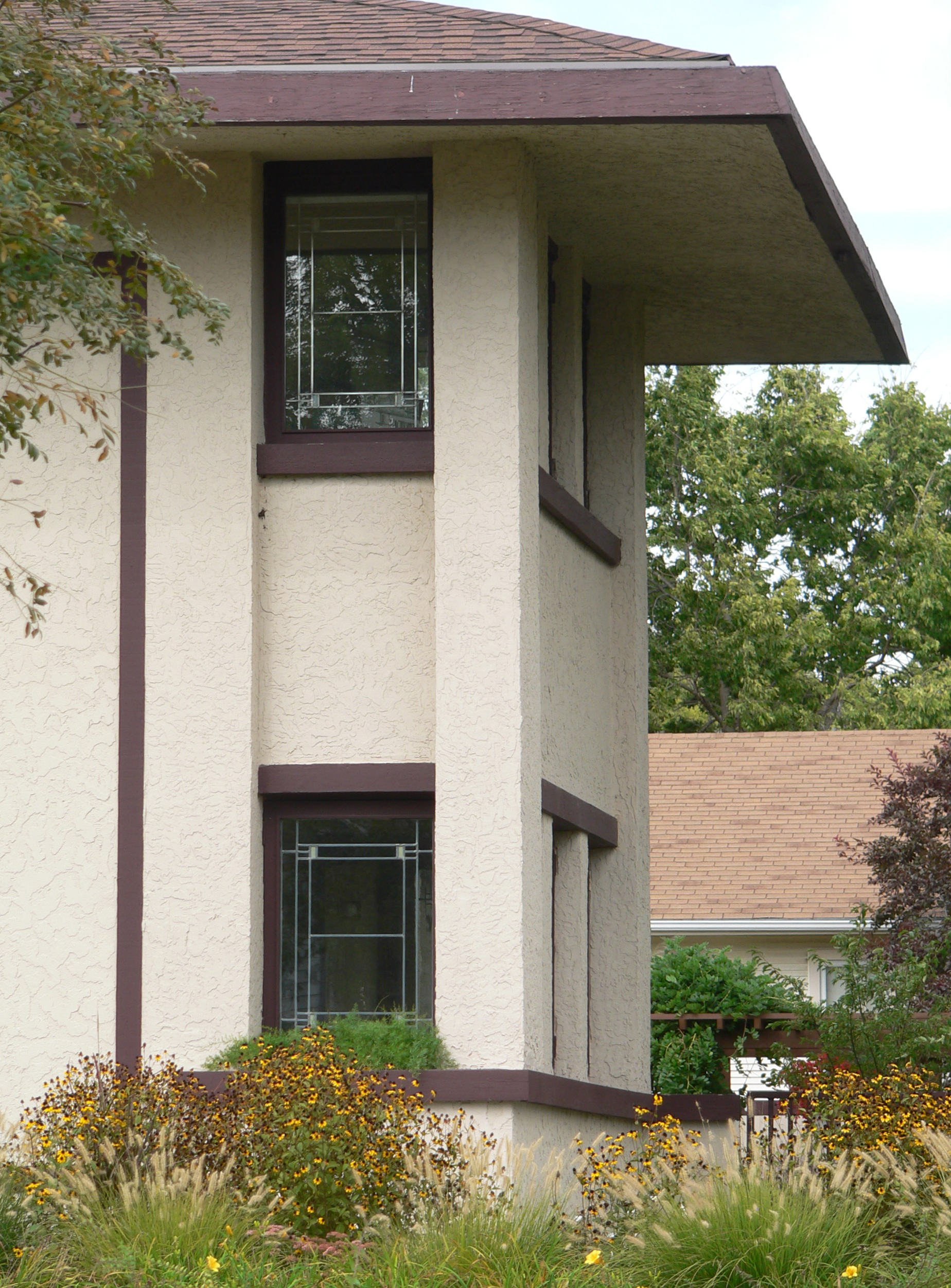
From the southeast: The overhanging eaves and art glass "light screen" windows are classic Prairie School features.

All three designs for the Suttons used a cruciform plan. Architect and architectural historian Robert McCarter cites them as "astonishing variations" on this classic Prairie style layout. The unbuilt first plan was single story with gables, and had the dining room in the west arm of the cross, the library in the opposite east arm, and the living room in the center projecting out into the landscape. The second plan was a "fully developed prairie style solution" with a low-pitched hip roof. In this second design, Wright placed the fireplace in the center of the cruciform, surrounded by a room in each arm and "the space of all four rooms flowing freely around" the hearth.

In the third plan, which was finally approved by Mrs. Sutton, the dining room is once again in the west, the reception room in the east, and the living room in the center. However, the three rooms are now all equally wide front to back and the fireplace moved forward from the rear (north) wall, causing the living room to project forward. McCarter calls this an "impacted cruciform" where Wright's usual cruciform is "folded in on itself, producing an experiential density and tension between the space-defining elements." As a result, the main floor boasts a gracious sweep of the three public rooms, becoming in effect one very large space. In this it bears stylistic similarities to the K. C. DeRhodes House in South Bend and the George Barton House in Buffalo, New York, of this same time period. The kitchen is behind the fireplace in the north arm of the cross, and the sixth bedroom occupies the northeast corner that would be empty in a pure cruciform plan.

The narrow axis of the plan faces the street to the east, and the main entrance lies midway along the long side of the plan. The use of hip roofs includes a very large cantilevered hip roof over the living room terrace. The pitch of the main hip roof is shallow enough to give the passer-by on the sidewalk in front of the house the impression that it is a flat roof.

The ornamental glass "light screens" in this house were designed by Wright with the assistance of Oak Park Studio draughtswoman, Isabel Roberts, who would later become an architect in her own right. They were fabricated by the Temple Art Glass Company of Chicago, which was the same firm Wright had just used for his renowned Unity Temple (Oak Park, Illinois, 1905).

The Sutton House is a private residence, and should be viewed only from the public sidewalks.

== See also ==
- List of Frank Lloyd Wright works
