= Indianola, Nebraska =

Village in Red Willow County, Nebraska, US

- Village
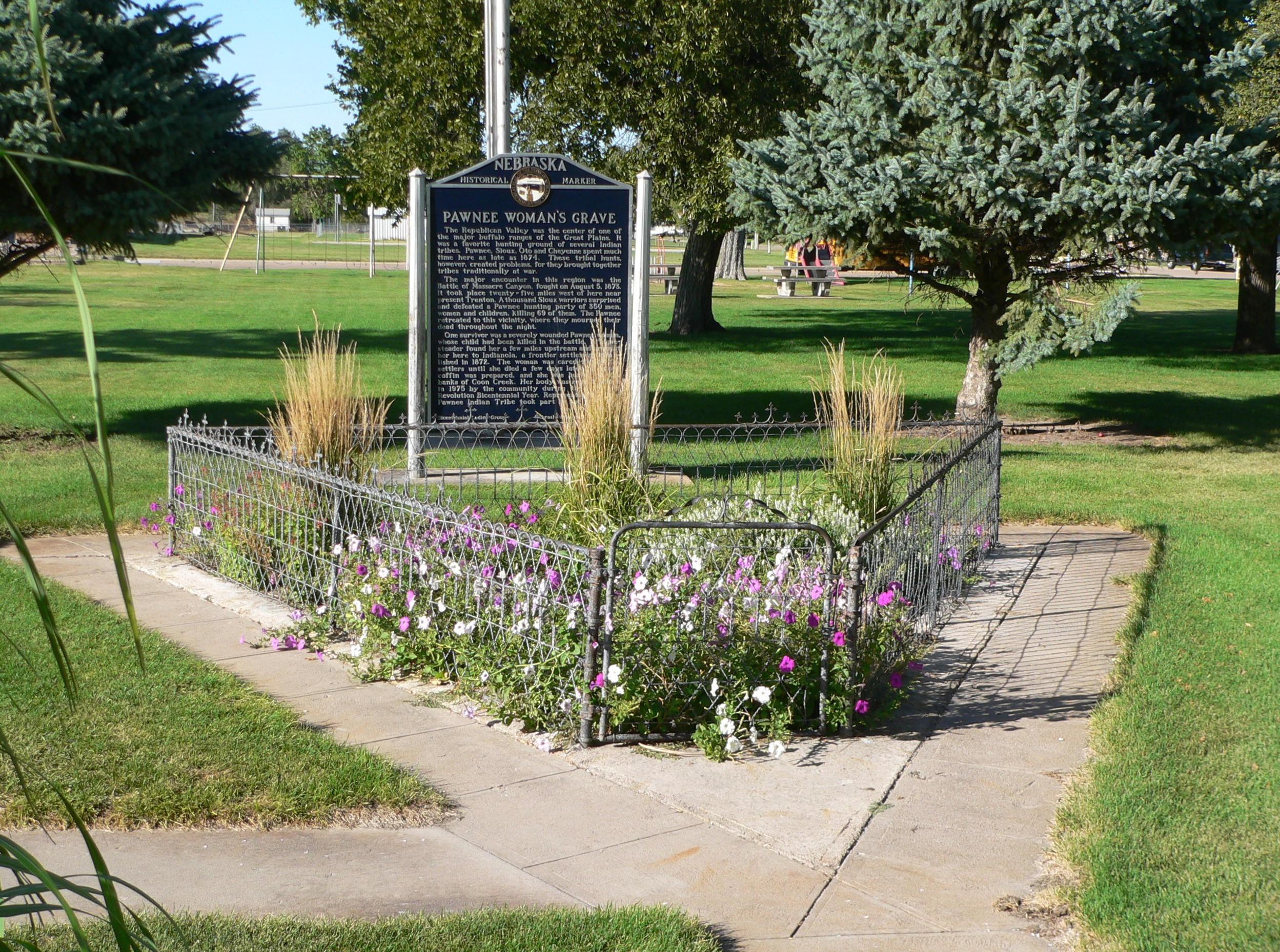
- Indianola town park: grave of Pawnee victim of Massacre Canyon event, September 2010

- Location of Indianola, Nebraska
- Coordinates: 40°14′05″N 100°25′11″W
- Country: United States
- State: Nebraska
- County: Red Willow

Area
  - Total: 1.25 sq mi (3.23 km^{2})
  - Land: 1.25 sq mi (3.23 km^{2})
  - Water: 0 sq mi (0.00 km^{2})
- Elevation: 2,382 ft (726 m)

Population (2020)
  - Total: 524
  - Density: 419.9/sq mi (162.14/km^{2})
- Time zone: UTC-6 (Central (CST))
  - Summer (DST): UTC-5 (CDT)
- ZIP code: 69034
- Area code: 308
- FIPS code: 31-23830
- GNIS feature ID: 2395425
- Website: cityofindianolane.net

Indianola is a village in Red Willow County, Nebraska, United States. The population was 584 at the 2010 census.

== History ==
Indianola was platted in 1873. The community was named after Indianola, Iowa, the former hometown of an early settler. In its early days, Indianola was the county seat of Red Willow County. After the railroad opted to locate its midpoint terminal on the Omaha to Denver route in McCook rather than in Indianola, the seat was moved there and Indianola declined.

Located in the City Park of Indianola is the grave of a Pawnee woman who died of wounds received at the battle between the Sioux and Pawnee tribes at Massacre Canyon, just east of Trenton. The woman was originally buried northwest of town on a bluff overlooking Coon Creek. In the 1970s, it became obvious that erosion would eventually destroy her gravesite, and in 1975 she was reburied in the park, with representatives of the Pawnee tribe participating in the ceremony.

== Geography ==
According to the United States Census Bureau, the city has a total area of 1.25 square miles (3.24 km^{2}), all land.

== Demographics ==
Historical population
Census	Pop.	Note	%±
1880	233		—
1890	579		148.5%
1900	626		8.1%
1910	681		8.8%
1920	742		9.0%
1930	815		9.8%
1940	800		−1.8%
1950	738		−7.7%
1960	754		2.2%
1970	672		−10.9%
1980	856		27.4%
1990	672		−21.5%
2000	642		−4.5%
2010	584		−9.0%
2020	524		−10.3%
U.S. Decennial Census

=== 2010 census ===
As of the census of 2010, there were 584 people, 256 households, and 160 families residing in the city. The population density was 467.2 inhabitants per square mile (180.4/km^{2}). There were 295 housing units at an average density of 236.0 per square mile (91.1/km^{2}). The racial makeup of the city was 98.1% White, 0.3% Native American, 0.2% Asian, 0.5% from other races, and 0.9% from two or more races. Hispanic or Latino of any race were 1.5% of the population.

There were 256 households, of which 27.7% had children under the age of 18 living with them, 52.3% were married couples living together, 7.4% had a female householder with no husband present, 2.7% had a male householder with no wife present, and 37.5% were non-families. 33.2% of all households were made up of individuals, and 11.7% had someone living alone who was 65 years of age or older. The average household size was 2.28 and the average family size was 2.92.

The median age in the city was 42.8 years. 24.7% of residents were under the age of 18; 6.7% were between the ages of 18 and 24; 20.7% were from 25 to 44; 32% were from 45 to 64; and 15.9% were 65 years of age or older. The gender makeup of the city was 51.5% male and 48.5% female.

=== 2000 census ===
As of the census of 2000, there were 642 people, 275 households, and 183 families residing in the city. The population density was 514.9 inhabitants per square mile (198.8/km^{2}). There were 325 housing units at an average density of 260.6 per square mile (100.6/km^{2}). The racial makeup of the city was 97.66% White, 0.93% Native American, 0.47% Asian, 0.62% from other races, and 0.31% from two or more races. Hispanic or Latino of any race were 1.40% of the population.

There were 275 households, out of which 28.4% had children under the age of 18 living with them, 57.5% were married couples living together, 6.9% had a female householder with no husband present, and 33.1% were non-families. 29.1% of all households were made up of individuals, and 12.4% had someone living alone who was 65 years of age or older. The average household size was 2.33 and the average family size was 2.88.

In the city, the population was spread out, with 24.3% under the age of 18, 7.9% from 18 to 24, 28.0% from 25 to 44, 23.7% from 45 to 64, and 16.0% who were 65 years of age or older. The median age was 39 years. For every 100 females, there were 101.3 males. For every 100 females age 18 and over, there were 102.5 males.

As of 2000 the median income for a household in the city was $27,344, and the median income for a family was $35,469. Males had a median income of $27,750 versus $16,094 for females. The per capita income for the city was $14,774. About 9.0% of families and 10.4% of the population were below the poverty line, including 14.1% of those under age 18 and 11.1% of those age 65 or over.

== See also ==
- List of municipalities in Nebraska
