= McCook, Nebraska =

City in and county seat of Red Willow County, Nebraska, United States

- City
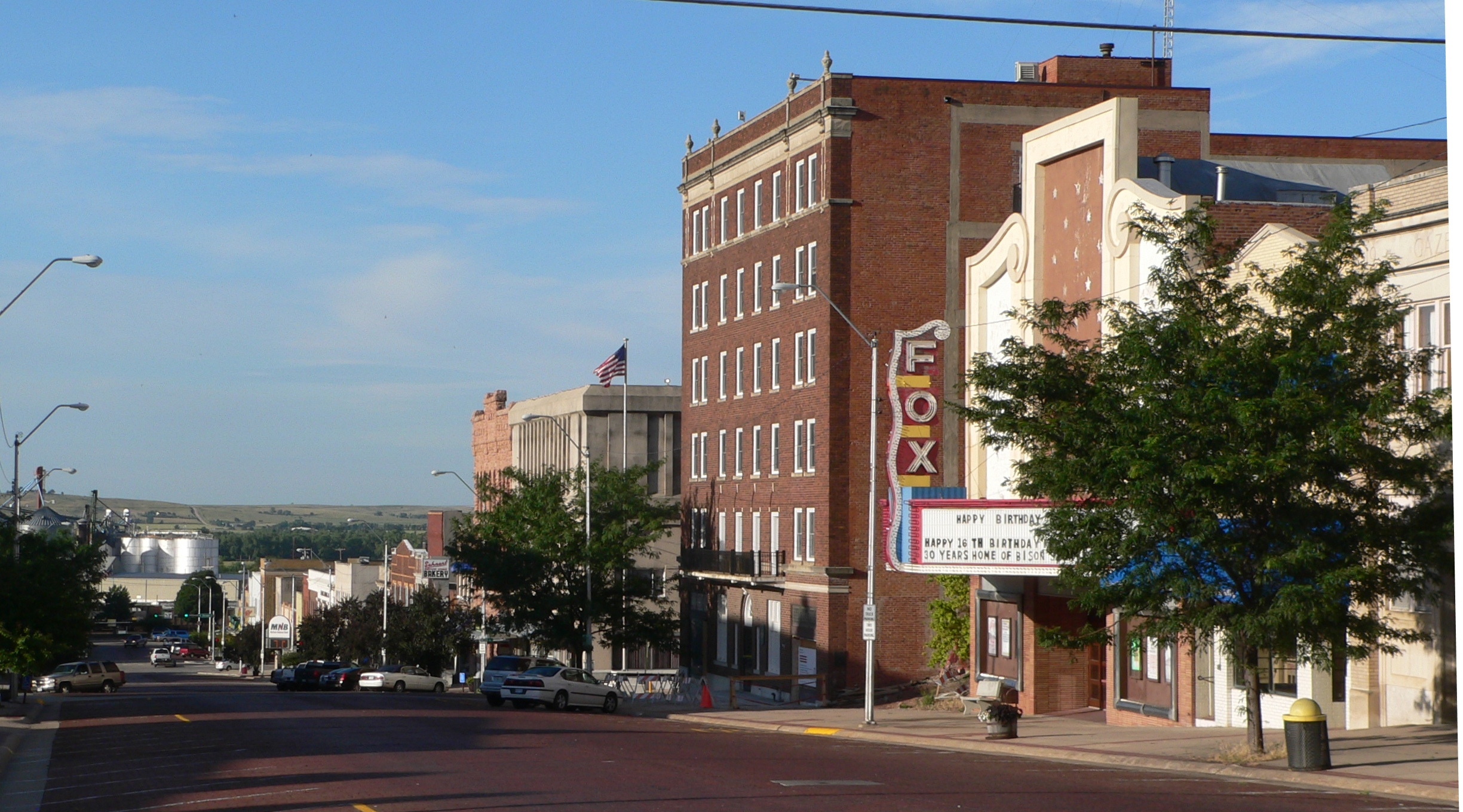
- George Norris Avenue in McCook, July 2010

- Location of McCook within Nebraska and Red Willow County
- Coordinates: 40°12′19″N 100°37′34″W
- Country: United States
- State: Nebraska
- County: Red Willow

Government
  - Mayor: Linda Taylor

Area
  - Total: 5.46 sq mi (14.14 km^{2})
  - Land: 5.46 sq mi (14.14 km^{2})
  - Water: 0 sq mi (0.00 km^{2})
- Elevation: 2,582 ft (787 m)

Population (2020)
  - Total: 7,446
  - Density: 1,364.0/sq mi (526.64/km^{2})
- Time zone: UTC−6 (Central (CST))
  - Summer (DST): UTC−5 (CDT)
- ZIP code: 69001
- Area code: 308
- FIPS code: 31-29925
- GNIS feature ID: 2395061
- Website: cityofmccook.com

McCook is a city in and the county seat of Red Willow County, Nebraska, United States. The population was 7,446 at the 2020 census.

== History ==
McCook was platted in 1882 when the Burlington and Missouri River Railroad was extended to that point. It was named in honor of Alexander McDowell McCook, a brigadier general in the Union Army during the American Civil War.

On May 17, 2019, a large EF2 tornado tore through parts of McCook, Nebraska. It destroyed a farmhouse, tearing off the roof and completely demolishing the garage. The storm formed around 4:30 p.m. Central Time and quickly developed into a large, wedge tornado. There were no fatalities or severe injuries. The storm was called the Perry EF2, originally forming in Perry, Nebraska.

== Geography ==
According to the United States Census Bureau, the city has a total area of 5.39 square miles (13.96 km^{2}), all land.

=== Climate ===
McCook's climate is formally classified as hot-summer humid continental. Due to the very hot and humid summers typical of the Midwest and the January daily mean averaging around −3 °C (27 °F) it has a little bit of influence of the subtropical climates to the south, although except during periods of chinook warming winter nights are much too severe for subtropical plants to thrive. Winters are generally cold and dry and summers hot and humid. Precipitation is concentrated in spring and summer, accumulating to an annual normal of 22.53 in (572 mm), the majority of which occurs from May through August. Snowfall is generally light, with a normal of 28.8 in (73 cm) per season, and generally occurs from November through April.

Record temperatures range from −30 °F (−34 °C) on January 12, 1912, up to 115 °F (46 °C) on June 26, 2012; the record cold maximum is −4 °F (−20 °C) on December 22, 1990 and December 22–23, 1989, while, conversely the record warm minimum is 88 °F (31 °C) on August 1, 1935. More typically, however, there is an average of 5.4 days annually with a maximum at or above 100 °F (37.8 °C), 45 days annually with a maximum at or above 90 °F (32.2 °C), 28 days annually where the maximum stays at or below freezing, and 8.6 days annually with a minimum at or below 0 °F (−17.8 °C).

Climate data for McCook, Nebraska (1991–2020 normals, extremes 1894–present)
Month	Jan	Feb	Mar	Apr	May	Jun	Jul	Aug	Sep	Oct	Nov	Dec	Year
Record high °F (°C)	78 (26)	83 (28)	93 (34)	98 (37)	106 (41)	115 (46)	114 (46)	111 (44)	107 (42)	98 (37)	89 (32)	81 (27)	115 (46)
Mean maximum °F (°C)	64 (18)	70 (21)	81 (27)	87 (31)	94 (34)	101 (38)	104 (40)	101 (38)	97 (36)	89 (32)	76 (24)	65 (18)	105 (41)
Mean daily maximum °F (°C)	41.6 (5.3)	44.9 (7.2)	56.2 (13.4)	64.9 (18.3)	74.4 (23.6)	85.9 (29.9)	90.8 (32.7)	88.3 (31.3)	80.9 (27.2)	67.5 (19.7)	54.0 (12.2)	42.7 (5.9)	66.0 (18.9)
Daily mean °F (°C)	27.7 (−2.4)	30.6 (−0.8)	40.3 (4.6)	49.5 (9.7)	59.7 (15.4)	71.0 (21.7)	76.3 (24.6)	74.0 (23.3)	65.4 (18.6)	51.7 (10.9)	38.8 (3.8)	29.1 (−1.6)	51.2 (10.7)
Mean daily minimum °F (°C)	13.8 (−10.1)	16.2 (−8.8)	24.5 (−4.2)	34.1 (1.2)	45.0 (7.2)	56.2 (13.4)	61.7 (16.5)	59.6 (15.3)	50.0 (10.0)	35.9 (2.2)	23.6 (−4.7)	15.5 (−9.2)	36.3 (2.4)
Mean minimum °F (°C)	−3 (−19)	0 (−18)	9 (−13)	21 (−6)	32 (0)	46 (8)	54 (12)	52 (11)	36 (2)	21 (−6)	8 (−13)	−1 (−18)	−8 (−22)
Record low °F (°C)	−30 (−34)	−26 (−32)	−20 (−29)	0 (−18)	14 (−10)	34 (1)	43 (6)	39 (4)	22 (−6)	−1 (−18)	−14 (−26)	−27 (−33)	−30 (−34)
Average precipitation inches (mm)	0.42 (11)	0.70 (18)	1.20 (30)	2.36 (60)	3.01 (76)	3.36 (85)	3.33 (85)	3.39 (86)	1.68 (43)	1.66 (42)	0.90 (23)	0.71 (18)	22.72 (577)
Average snowfall inches (cm)	4.7 (12)	7.7 (20)	4.2 (11)	3.1 (7.9)	0.1 (0.25)	0.0 (0.0)	0.0 (0.0)	0.0 (0.0)	0.0 (0.0)	1.0 (2.5)	3.3 (8.4)	5.8 (15)	29.9 (76)
Average precipitation days (≥ 0.01 in)	2.6	3.6	5.1	7.0	9.4	8.1	8.7	7.2	5.0	4.9	3.7	3.3	68.6
Average snowy days (≥ 0.1 in)	2.1	2.8	1.9	1.0	0.1	0.0	0.0	0.0	0.0	0.5	1.4	2.2	12.0
Source: NOAA

== Demographics ==
Historical population
Census	Pop.	Note	%±
1890	2,346		—
1900	2,445		4.2%
1910	3,765		54.0%
1920	4,303		14.3%
1930	6,688		55.4%
1940	6,212		−7.1%
1950	7,678		23.6%
1960	8,301		8.1%
1970	8,285		−0.2%
1980	8,404		1.4%
1990	8,112		−3.5%
2000	7,994		−1.5%
2010	7,698		−3.7%
2020	7,446		−3.3%
U.S. Decennial Census; 2012 Estimate

=== 2020 census ===
As of the 2020 census, McCook had a population of 7,446. The city had 1,733 families, and the population density was 1,363.7 per square mile (526.6/km^{2}). The median age was 40.3 years. 23.1% of residents were under the age of 18 and 21.5% of residents were 65 years of age or older. For every 100 females there were 94.6 males, and for every 100 females age 18 and over there were 91.7 males age 18 and over.

99.0% of residents lived in urban areas, while 1.0% lived in rural areas.

There were 3,258 households in McCook, of which 25.9% had children under the age of 18 living in them. Of all households, 44.8% were married-couple households, 19.9% were households with a male householder and no spouse or partner present, and 28.9% were households with a female householder and no spouse or partner present. About 35.4% of all households were made up of individuals and 17.0% had someone living alone who was 65 years of age or older.

There were 3,688 housing units, of which 11.7% were vacant. The homeowner vacancy rate was 2.4% and the rental vacancy rate was 10.3%.

Racial composition as of the 2020 census
Race	Number	Percent
White	6,721	90.3%
Black or African American	40	0.5%
American Indian and Alaska Native	32	0.4%
Asian	32	0.4%
Native Hawaiian and Other Pacific Islander	12	0.2%
Some other race	266	3.6%
Two or more races	343	4.6%
Hispanic or Latino (of any race)	572	7.7%

Income and poverty

The 2016–2020 5-year American Community Survey estimates show that the median household income was $44,961 (with a margin of error of +/- $7,970) and the median family income $63,060 (+/- $9,769). Males had a median income of $32,135 (+/- $8,325) versus $23,056 (+/- $5,565) for females. The median income for those above 16 years old was $26,273 (+/- $3,550). Approximately, 3.1% of families and 8.2% of the population were below the poverty line, including 6.3% of those under the age of 18 and 2.8% of those ages 65 or over.

=== 2010 census ===
As of the census of 2010, there were 7,698 people, 3,324 households, and 2,021 families living in the city. The population density was 1,428.2 inhabitants per square mile (551.4/km^{2}). There were 3,717 housing units at an average density of 689.6 per square mile (266.3/km^{2}). The racial makeup of the city was 95.8% White, 0.5% African American, 0.5% Native American, 0.4% Asian, 1.5% from other races, and 1.3% from two or more races. Hispanic or Latino of any race were 4.9% of the population.

There were 3,324 households, of which 27.4% had children under the age of 18 living with them, 47.8% were married couples living together, 9.3% had a female householder with no husband present, 3.7% had a male householder with no wife present, and 39.2% were non-families. 33.9% of all households were made up of individuals, and 16.7% had someone living alone who was 65 years of age or older. The average household size was 2.25 and the average family size was 2.89.

The median age in the city was 40.7 years. 23% of residents were under the age of 18; 9.4% were between the ages of 18 and 24; 22% were from 25 to 44; 26.2% were from 45 to 64; and 19.5% were 65 years of age or older. The gender makeup of the city was 48.3% male and 51.7% female.

=== 2000 census ===
As of the census of 2000, there were 7,994 people, 3,371 households, and 2,154 families living in the city. The population density was 1,485.1 inhabitants per square mile (573.4/km^{2}). There were 3,754 housing units at an average density of 697.4 per square mile (269.3/km^{2}). The racial makeup of the city was 97.37% White, 0.18% African American, 0.45% Native American, 0.18% Asian, 0.91% from other races, and 0.91% from two or more races. Hispanic or Latino of any race were 2.53% of the population. The population was 7,410 in 2009.

There were 3,371 households, out of which 29.1% had children under the age of 18 living with them, 52.7% were married couples living together, 8.2% had a female householder with no husband present, and 36.1% were non-families. 31.7% of all households were made up of individuals, and 15.2% had someone living alone who was 65 years of age or older. The average household size was 2.29 and the average family size was 2.90.

In the city, the population was spread out, with 24.1% under the age of 18, 9.7% from 18 to 24, 24.2% from 25 to 44, 21.3% from 45 to 64, and 20.7% who were 65 years of age or older. The median age was 40 years. For every 100 females, there were 89.2 males. For every 100 females age 18 and over, there were 86.3 males.

As of 2000 the median income for a household in the city was $31,105, and the median income for a family was $40,455. Males had a median income of $28,065 versus $18,516 for females. The per capita income for the city was $16,691. About 7.9% of families and 9.4% of the population were below the poverty line, including 9.7% of those under age 18 and 8.4% of those age 65 or over.

== Culture ==
The Harvey P. Sutton House at 602 Norris Avenue was designed by influential architect Frank Lloyd Wright in 1905–1907 and built 1907–1908. The classic Prairie-style house is listed in the National Register of Historic Places; it is the only Wright house known to have been built in Nebraska. The house is used as a private residence, and is not open to the public.

McCook Army Airfield, active from 1943 through 1945, was located nine miles northwest of McCook.

McCook hosted a professional baseball team, the McCook Braves, who played in the Nebraska State League from 1956 to 1959. In their final season in 1959, the club featured future Baseball Hall of Famer Phil Niekro and won the NSL championship; both the Braves and the league folded at season's end. Another pitcher on the team, Pat Jordan, later became a writer for the Sporting News, and wrote an autobiography dealing with his career with the Braves, A False Spring.

McCook is home to the first two-year junior college in Nebraska. McCook Junior College was founded in September 1926 on the second floor of the YMCA building on Main Street. The name was eventually changed to McCook Community College and was governed over the Mid-Plains Area. The McCook Economic Development Corporation works “To facilitate the formation, retention, attraction, and expansion of businesses in McCook and the surrounding area.”

McCook restaurant, Sehnert's Bakery & Bieroc Cafe, is a James Beard America’s Classic Award Winner. They are the only restaurant to win this award in the whole state of Nebraska.

== Events ==
Heritage Days is an annual event held the last full weekend in September. This event has been happening since 1971. It is the town’s largest celebration. This event includes the Heritage Day Parade, a road race, entertainment from the high schoolers, and vendors on the street. Red Willow County Fair is a five day fair held in July. This is the fair for the whole county. It includes games, rides, concerts, tractor rides, a rodeo, and food from local families and businesses. Crazy Days is an annual weekend event to celebrate the local businesses. It includes crazy days sales in the stores, costume contests, and a car show. On the Friday night of this weekend, the people of this small town bring out their old and fancy cars and cruise up and down the main street in town, West B St. and Norris Ave. McCook hosts the Buffalo Commons Storytelling Festival each summer.

== Parks and recreation ==
McCook is home to Heritage Hills Golf Course. The 18-hole par-72 championship golf course was designed by Bradford Benz, ASGCA, and Richard M. Phelps, ASGCA, and opened in 1981. The links style course plays over 7,100 yards from the back tees. Heritage Hills was included in Golf Digest's Best 75 Golf Course's in 1984 and Golf Digest's Top 100 Toughest Public Course's in 1986. Heritage Hills underwent a major renovation for upgrades and modernization in 2013.

== Government ==
McCook has a council-manager style government. Five council members are elected at large; the five elect one of their number as mayor, and a second as vice president. As of 2015, council members are Mayor Mike Gonzales, Vice-President Janet Hepp, Jerry Calvin, Bruce McDowell, and Gene Weedin.

The city government operates through eight departments and offices: Administration, Building and Zoning, Fire, Library, Police, Public Works, Senior Center, and Utilities. Advisory boards and commissions, both those required by law and those created for specific purposes, are appointed by the council; as of 2015, there were fourteen such boards and commissions.

On August 19, 2025, Nebraska Governor Jim Pillen and U.S. Secretary of Homeland Security Kristi Noem announced that an immigration detention center, Cornhusker Clink, would be established in McCook. The facility is planned to include 280 beds and will be located in the Work Ethic Camp, a minimum-security prison labor camp in McCook. Development came after other immigration detention centers, like Alligator Alcatraz, were opened by the Trump Administration. The announcement immediately drew criticism from many Nebraska lawmakers and the Nebraska ACLU.

== Transportation ==
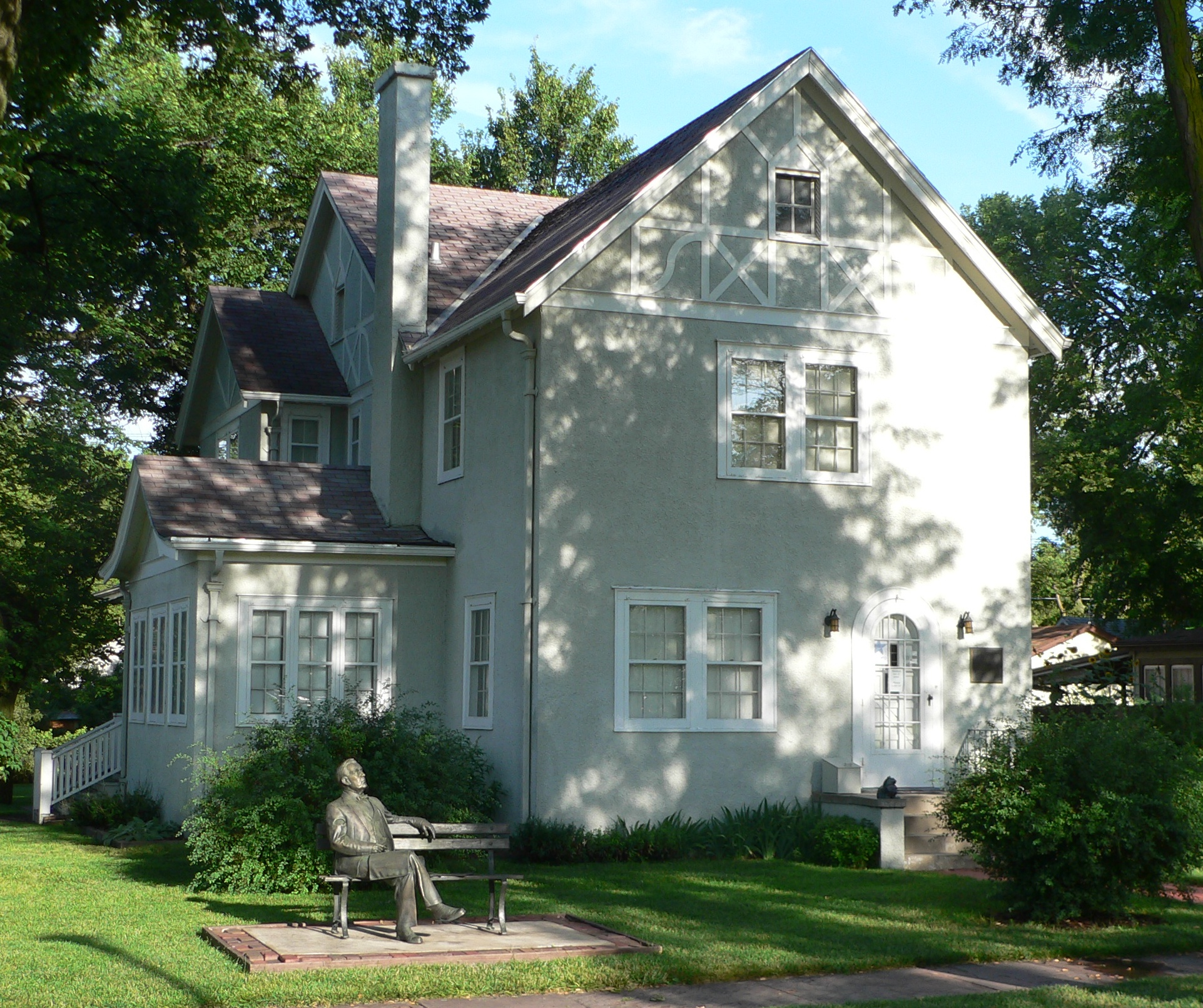
The George Norris House in McCook is listed in the National Register of Historic Places.

=== Highway ===
McCook sits on three important US Highway routes. The north-south road is U.S. Route 83 which travels north 14.5 miles (23.3 km) from the Kansas border to South Dakota via North Platte (where it meets Interstate 80 and Valentine. U.S. 6 and U.S. 34 are cosigned through McCook travelling east-west. U.S. Route 34 serves as a connection to Colorado and Denver to the West and is a key in state link to Lincoln via a number of other mid-sized Nebraska cities such as Holdrege, Hastings, Grand Island, and Seward. U.S. Route 6 traveling west splits from US34 15 miles out of town and heads Northwest to Colorado. Traveling east it splits from US34 at Hastings and is an alternate route for I-80 to Omaha and Lincoln.

=== Rail ===
Amtrak, the national passenger rail system, provides service through McCook, operating its California Zephyr daily in both directions between Chicago and Emeryville (Oakland), California, with stops in Omaha, Lincoln, and Hastings. The service stops at McCook station.

=== Air ===
Commuter airline Denver Air Connection is currently serving the McCook Regional Airport with daily nonstop round trip commercial flights to Denver, Colorado.

== Media ==
=== Newspapers ===
The McCook Daily Gazette is the city's newspaper, published five days a week. In 1929, the newspaper became one of the first in the world to be delivered regularly by air: for several months its airplane, named the Newsboy, flew a daily route, dropping bundles of newspapers to carriers in outlying towns.

=== Radio ===
AM radio stations
Frequency	Call sign	Name	Format	Owner	Target city/market	City of license
1300 AM	KBRL	The Big Talker	News/Talk	Armada Media	McCook	McCook
1360 AM	KNGN		Christian	Kansas Nebraska Good News Broadcasting	McCook	McCook

FM radio stations
Frequency	Call sign	Name	Format	Owner	Target city/market	City of license
93.9 FM	KSWN-FM	The Zone	Contemporary Hits	Legacy Communications	McCook	McCook
95.3 FM	KGCR		Christian	The Praise Network, Inc	McCook	-
96.1 FM	KICX-FM		Hot AC	Armada Media	McCook	McCook
102.1 FM	KZMC	True Country 102.1	Classic Country	Legacy Communications	McCook	McCook
101.1 FM	KFNF	Today's Best Country	Country	Armada Media	McCook	Oberlin
103.9	KQHK	The Hawk	Classic Rock	Armada Media	McCook	McCook
105.3 FM	KIOD	Coyote 105	Country	Legacy Communication	McCook	McCook

== Notable people ==
Three governors of Nebraska made their homes in McCook: Ralph G. Brooks, Frank Morrison, and Ben Nelson, who represented Nebraska in the U.S. Senate for two terms, from 2000 to 2012. Frank B. Morrison Jr., Montana Supreme Court justice and son of Frank Morrison, was born in McCook.

Former professional football player Jeff Kinney is a 1968 graduate of McCook High School.

TV evangelist Bob Larson was raised in McCook.

John R. McCarl, the first Comptroller General of the United States, was raised in McCook. He is also buried there.

George W. Norris, who held seats in the U.S. House of Representatives and Senate from 1903 to 1943, was a resident of McCook. Norris was the driving force behind the conversion of Nebraska's legislature to a unicameral system; in the Senate, he was a leading figure behind the creation of the Tennessee Valley Authority. His house in McCook is operated as a museum by the Nebraska State Historical Society, and is listed in the National Register of Historic Places. Originally named Main, the principal north–south thoroughfare through central McCook was renamed Norris Avenue in his honor.

== See also ==
- List of municipalities in Nebraska
- National Register of Historic Places listings in Red Willow County, Nebraska
