= Nebraska Highway 89 =

State highway in Nebraska, U.S.

State Highway 89

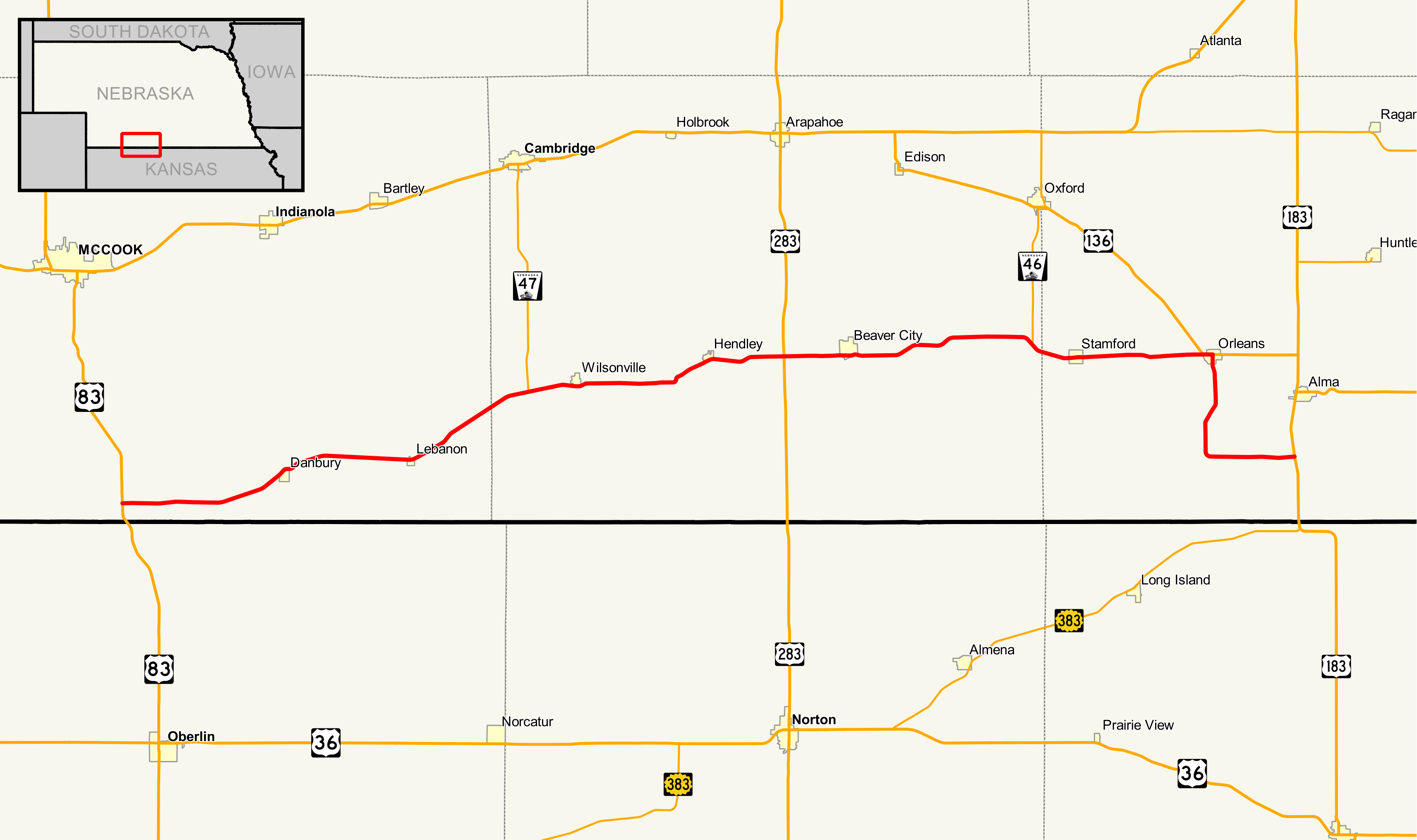
- Nebraska Highway 89 highlighted in red

Route information
- Maintained by NDOT
- Length: 72.51 mi (116.69 km)
- Existed: 1934–present

Major junctions
- West end: US 83 west of Danbury
- US 283 west of Beaver City; N-46 northwest of Stamford; US 136 in Orleans
- East end: US 183 south of Alma

Location
- Country: United States
- State: Nebraska
- Counties: Red Willow, Furnas, Harlan

Highway system
- Nebraska State Highway System; Interstate; US; State; Link; Spur; State Spurs; Recreation
← N-88	→ N-91

Nebraska Highway 89 is a highway in southern Nebraska. Its western terminus is at U.S. Highway 83 west of Danbury. Its eastern terminus is at an intersection with U.S. Highway 183 south of Alma.

== Route description ==
Nebraska Highway 89 begins at US 83 west of Danbury, and heads in a northeasterly direction into farmland. It passes through the unincorporated area of Marion, as well as Danbury and Lebanon. Further ahead, the route passes by NE 47 and continues eastward into Wilsonville. The highway continues onward, turning again to the northeast as it passes through Hendley before heading directly eastward again. West of Beaver City, it intersects with US 283 before actually passing through Beaver City. It then meets with NE 46 before heading through Stamford to the east. The route passes through the Flynn Junction area before entering the city of Orleans. At this point, it meets US 136 and runs concurrently with it for half a mile before turning to the south. It heads south and to the east before terminating at US 183 south of Alma.

== Major intersections ==
County	Location	mi	km	Destinations	Notes
Red Willow		0.00	0.00	US 83 (South 6th Street)	
Furnas	Wilsonville	23.81	38.32	N-47 north	
Furnas		38.23	61.53	US 283	
Furnas	Stamford	52.08	83.81	N-46 north	
Harlan	Orleans	61.58	99.10	US 136 west	West end of US 136 overlap
Harlan	Orleans	62.10	99.94	US 136 east (East North Street)	East end of US 136 overlap
Harlan		72.51	116.69	US 183	
1.000 mi = 1.609 km; 1.000 km = 0.621 mi: Concurrency terminus
