= Bess Furman =

American journalist (1894–1969)

- Born: December 2, 1894; Danbury
- Died: May 12, 1969 (aged 74)
- Occupation: Journalist, teacher

Bess Furman Armstrong (December 2, 1894 – May 12, 1969) was an American journalist. She covered the White House during five presidential administrations, as a reporter for the Associated Press from 1929 to 1936, then as a correspondent for The New York Times from 1943 to 1961. Her close relationship with Eleanor Roosevelt shaped her career as she reported on Roosevelt's political activities, unprecedented for a First Lady. During the 1960s, Furman was the top public affairs official in the Department of Health, Education and Welfare.

== Early life ==
Bess Furman was born in Danbury, Nebraska on December 2, 1894. She was the second child of five born to Archie Furman and Mattie Ann Van Pelt Furman. Her father was the publisher of the Danbury News, where she learned to set type as a young child. The Furmans moved to Fort Collins, Colorado in 1906, but Archie and Bess had returned to southwest Nebraska by 1910, while her mother moved to Kirksville, Missouri with the younger children to attend the American School of Osteopathy. Bess worked in the office of her father's newspaper, the Marion Enterprise.

== Education and early career ==
From 1911 to 1913 Bess attended the Missouri State Normal School in Kirksville. When her mother moved to Kearney, Nebraska to practice as a doctor of osteopathy, Bess attended a summer institute for teachers at the Nebraska State Normal School at Kearney. In 1917 she became the first woman editor of the school's student newspaper, The Antelope. She graduated with a professional life teacher's certificate in 1917 and returned to teaching, but her efforts at the student newspaper impressed the editor of the Kearney Daily Hub enough to offer her a job there.

In February 1920, Furman was offered a position at the Omaha Daily News as a feature writer on the Sunday magazine. Her starting salary was thirty dollars a week. She worked to develop an identity with the pseudonym Bobbie O'Dare. In addition to features she wrote a weekly column titled "Observing Omaha." Furman was elected president of the Omaha Woman's Press Club in 1925. She drove her Ford Model T (nicknamed "Sylvia") to Rapid City, South Dakota to report on the activities of President Calvin Coolidge and his wife as they took the first presidential vacation in the Western United States in 1927; her photos of the couple appeared on the front page of the Omaha Bee-News for several days. In 1928 Furman covered the Omaha campaign stop of Alf Landon, winning a prize from Bookman magazine for her color story "We Want Al! Crowd Shouts."

== Work at the Associated Press ==
Her story about Landon's campaign stop caught the attention of the chief of the Associated Press, Byron Price, who offered Furman a position at the AP Washington Office in 1929. Her assignments were to cover stories of interest to women, including the activities of wives of elected officials. First Lady Lou Hoover disliked reporters, but Furman gained access to a White House function she was running for the Girl Scouts by posing as a Girl Scout leader. After that meeting, Furman was regularly invited to the White House.

Furman was the first woman reporter regularly assigned to report on the House of Representatives by a press association. During her time at the House Press Gallery, Furman met Robert J. Armstrong, Jr., a reporter with the Los Angeles Times and later the St. Louis Globe-Democrat. Though she was hesitant to marry him because she was eight years his senior, they married in March 1932 and were together until his death in 1955.

Furman met Eleanor Roosevelt at the 1932 Democratic National Convention, after Franklin Delano Roosevelt accepted the party's nomination. Although candidates' wives traditionally did not hold press conferences, Roosevelt agreed to one when Furman asked. After the presidential inauguration, Furman covered the first press conference given by a First Lady, as well as all twenty-eight press conferences Eleanor Roosevelt held in the first year of her husband's presidency. Furman often met with Roosevelt and three other women reporters over lunch to discuss Roosevelt's areas of political interest, including subsistence farming in West Virginia. Roosevelt gave the women reporters she worked with scoops, for example giving Furman and Ruby Black of the United Press permission to report first about serving beer in the White House. When Roosevelt's dog Meggie bit Furman on the lip, Roosevelt took Furman to an emergency clinic to receive stitches; Roosevelt called the AP office and explained what happened, offering to write Furman's story for her.

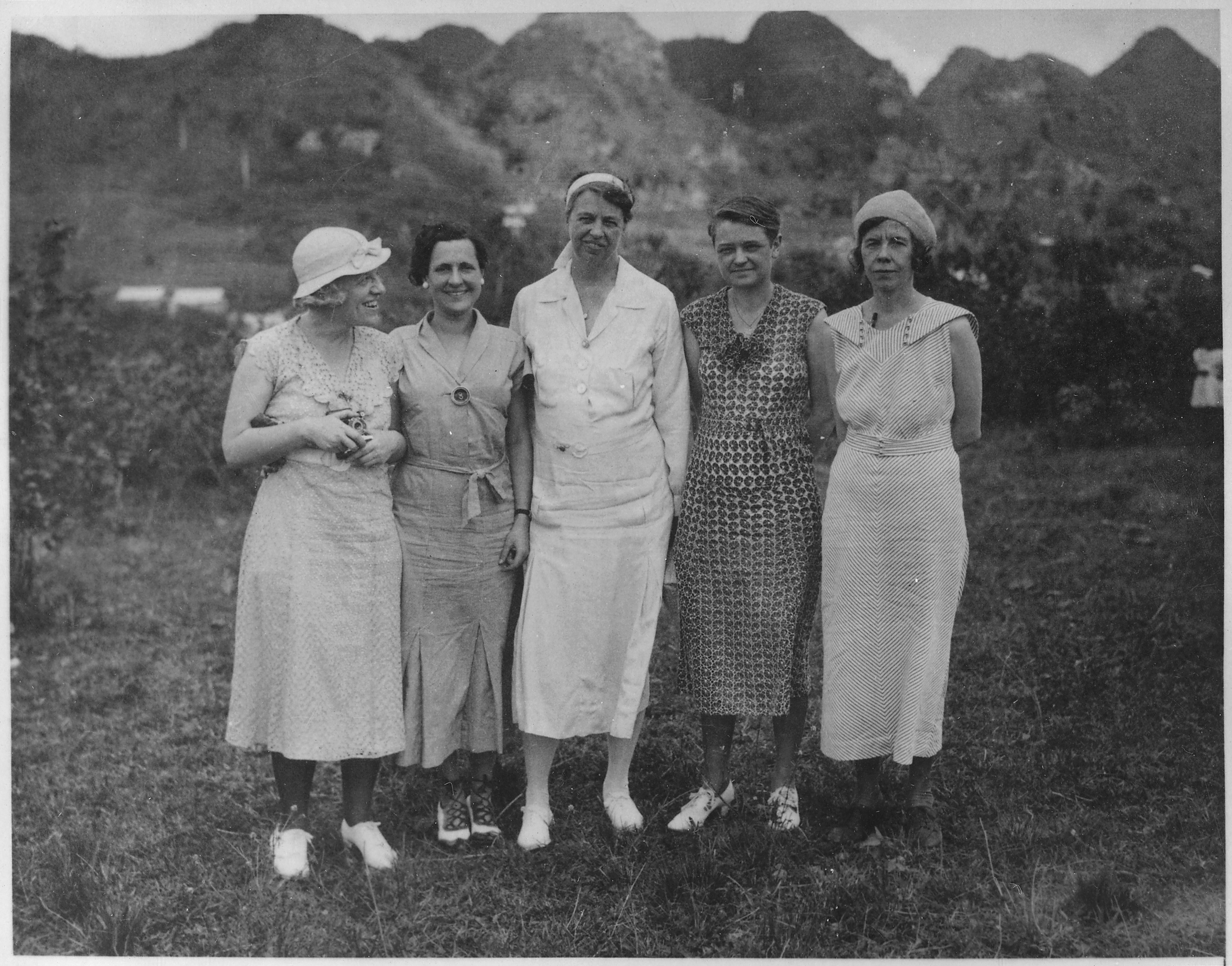
Eleanor Roosevelt (center) stands with reporters Emma Bugbee, Dorothy Ducas, Ruby Black, and Bess Furman on their 1934 trip to Puerto Rico.

A select group of women reporters, including Furman, accompanied Roosevelt on her travels; one such trip included a flight from Washington, D.C. to Baltimore with aviator Amelia Earhart. In 1934, Furman, Ruby Black, Dorothy Ducas of the International News Service, and Emma Bugbee of the New York Herald Tribune accompanied Roosevelt to the Virgin Islands and Puerto Rico, reporting on the poverty they saw there. Another group was referred to by Roosevelt as "the faithful four": Furman, Black, Martha Strayer of the Washington News, and Genevieve (Geno) Herrick of the Chicago Tribune. Furman also traveled with Roosevelt during the 1936 campaign during a tour of thirteen states.

In addition to her coverage of the First Lady, Furman wrote about the activities of Congressional women as well as organizations such as the League of Women Voters and the Daughters of the American Revolution. Furman submitted her last article for the AP in December 1936, after becoming pregnant at age 41.

== Motherhood and running Furman Features ==
Furman gave birth to twins in 1937, Ruth Eleanor and Robert Furman Armstrong; fellow journalist Geno Herrick quipped that "the AP always did make carbon copies." Ruth Bryan Owen and Eleanor Roosevelt were the twins' godmothers. Roosevelt knit a baby blanket for Furman and upon hearing the news of twins, sent a telegraph saying she needed to knit another blanket.

Her sister Lucile Furman moved in with the Armstrongs to help with childcare. Together Lucile and Bess ran Furman Features from 1937 to 1941, freelance writing for various national women's organizations, including the American Association of University Women and the Women's Division of the Democratic Party. They wrote the "Know Your Government" feature for the Democratic Digest and prepared "Rainbow Fliers" providing summaries of the Democratic platform for the 1940 campaign.

== Work at The New York Times ==
During World War II, Furman worked first at the Office of Facts and Figures and then at the Office of War Information as the Assistant Chief of the Magazine Division. She was anxious to return to newspaper journalism, and she joined The New York Times in 1943 as part of the Washington bureau. Furman continued her coverage of Eleanor Roosevelt's concerns; many of her stories focused on Roosevelt's humanitarian efforts. In addition to writing political stories of interest to women, during this time she became increasingly focused on issues of health and education. She was well regarded among her fellow journalists for her reportage informing the public about new trends in science, medicine, and education. Furman was elected as president of the National Women's Press Club in 1946. She remained at The New York Times until 1961.

== Work at the Department of Health, Education and Welfare ==
In 1961 she began working for the Department of Health, Education and Welfare. Furman became head of the Department's Press Information Section the following year, becoming the first woman to hold a top press position in a cabinet-rank agency. She also took on a special assignment to write a history of the Public Health Service.

== Books written, death, and legacy ==
Furman published her autobiography, Washington By-line: the Personal History of a Newspaperwoman, in 1949, detailing many life stories. In 1951 she went on to write White House Profile: A Social History of the White House, Its Occupants and Its Festivities. She died at her home in Woodacres, Maryland, on May 12, 1969.

In 1975 Furman was inducted into the Nebraska Newspaper Hall of Fame. The Nebraska Press Women named her a member of the Marian Andersen Nebraska Women Journalists Hall of Fame in 1991.

== Bibliography ==
- Furman, Bess (1949). Washington by-line : the personal history of a newspaperwoman. New York City: A.A. Knopf. OCLC 1319282.
- Gower, Kylie M. (August 2019). Finding agency : Bess Furman's negotiation of power and gender within a male discursive regime (PhD). Laramie, Wyoming: University of Wyoming. ISBN 9781088385579. OCLC 1121295921.
