= Arapahoe High School =

Arapahoe High School may refer to:

== In the United States ==
- Arapahoe High School (Colorado), Centennial, Colorado
- Arapahoe High School (Nebraska), Arapahoe, Nebraska
