= N46 =

N46 may refer to:

- N46 (Long Island bus)
- BMW N46, an automobile engine
- HMS Orpheus (N46), a submarine of the Royal Navy
- Nebraska Highway 46, in the United States
- Nogizaka46, a Japanese idol group
