= Nebraska Highway 46 =

State highway in Nebraska, U.S.

State Highway 46

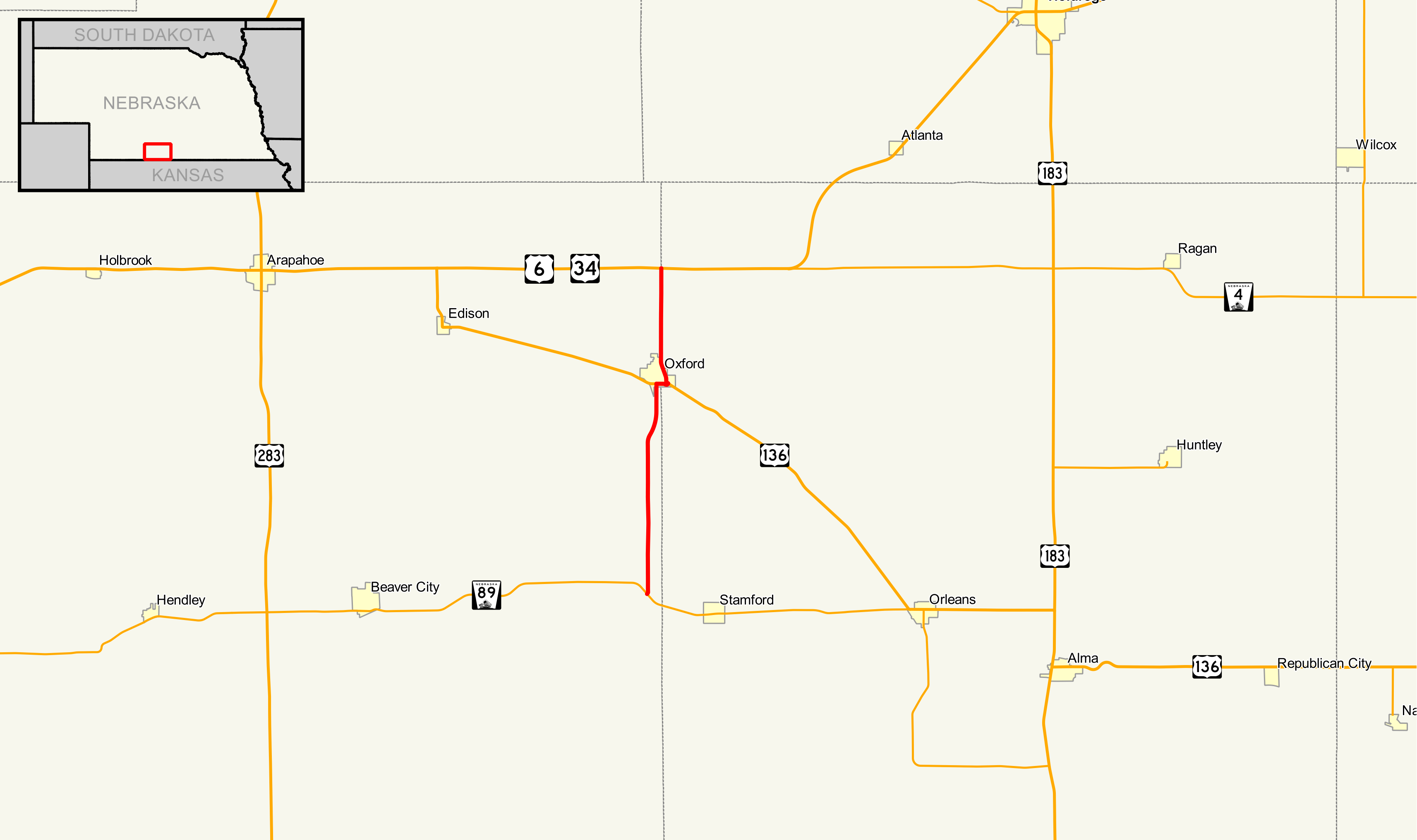
- Nebraska Highway 46 highlighted in red

Route information
- Maintained by NDOT
- Length: 12.00 mi (19.31 km)
- Existed: 1926–present

Major junctions
- South end: N-89 west of Stamford
- US 136 in Oxford
- North end: US 6 / US 34 north of Oxford

Location
- Country: United States
- State: Nebraska
- Counties: Furnas, Harlan

Highway system
- Nebraska State Highway System; Interstate; US; State; Link; Spur; State Spurs; Recreation
← N-45	→ N-47

Nebraska Highway 46 is a highway in Nebraska. It runs from south to north for a length of 12 miles (19 km). It has a southern terminus at Nebraska Highway 89 west of Stamford. It has a northern terminus at U.S. Highway 6 and U.S. Highway 34 north of Oxford.

== Route description ==
Nebraska Highway 46 begins at Nebraska Highway 89 west of Stamford. It goes north and meets U.S. Highway 136 in Oxford. They overlap through Oxford and separate on the eastern edge of Oxford. After a brief northwesterly section, the highway turns north at the Furnas County/Harlan County border and ends when it meets U.S. 6 and U.S. 34 north of Oxford.

== Major intersections ==
County	Location	mi	km	Destinations	Notes
Furnas	Stamford	0.00	0.00	N-89	
Furnas	Oxford	7.46	12.01	US 136 west (Cornwall Street)	Southern end of US 136 overlap
Harlan	Oxford	7.89	12.70	US 136 east	Northern end of US 136 overlap
Harlan–Furnas county line		12.00	19.31	US 6 / US 34	
1.000 mi = 1.609 km; 1.000 km = 0.621 mi: Concurrency terminus
