= Arapahoe, Nebraska =

City in Furnas County, Nebraska, United States

- City
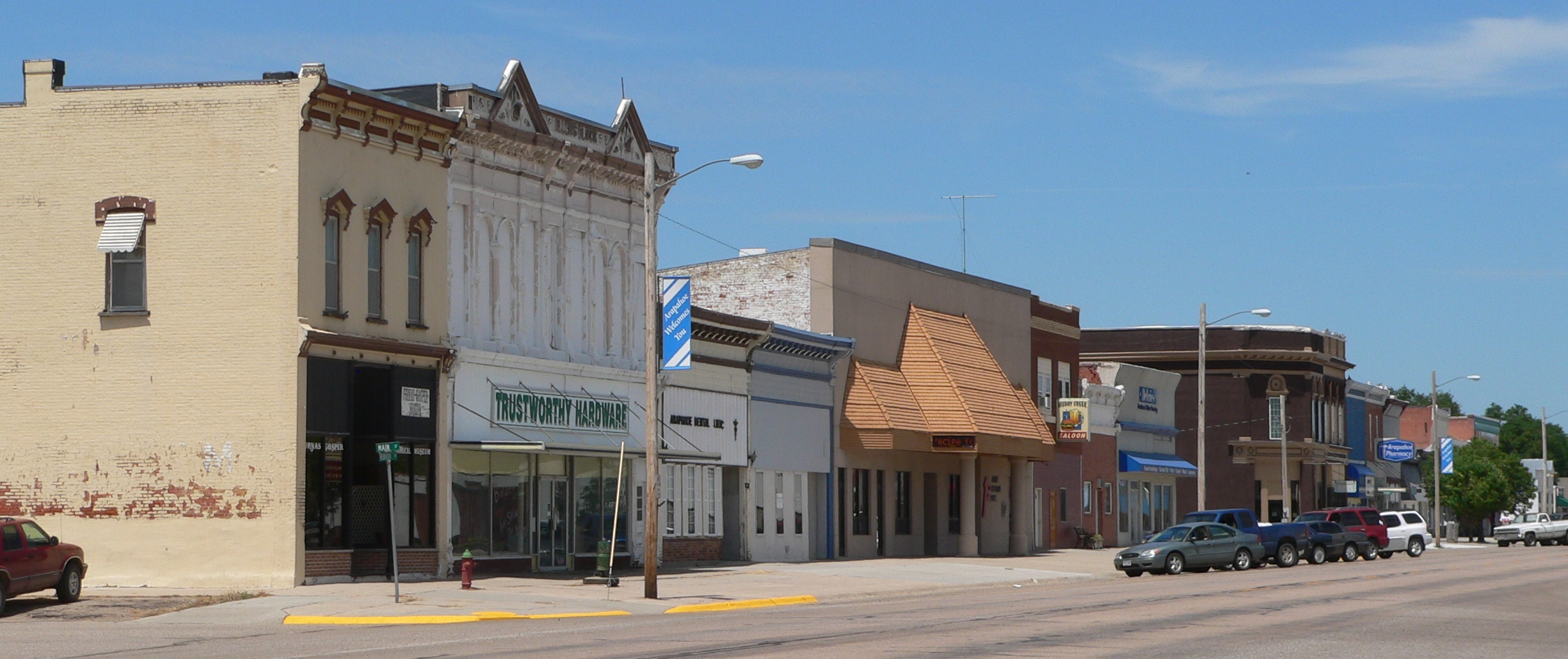
- Nebraska Avenue in Arapahoe, July 2010

- Location of Arapahoe, Nebraska
- Coordinates: 40°18′18″N 99°53′53″W
- Country: United States
- State: Nebraska
- County: Furnas

Area
  - Total: 0.97 sq mi (2.52 km^{2})
  - Land: 0.97 sq mi (2.52 km^{2})
  - Water: 0 sq mi (0.00 km^{2})
- Elevation: 2,179 ft (664 m)

Population (2020)
  - Total: 1,002
  - Density: 1,031.4/sq mi (398.24/km^{2})
- Time zone: UTC-6 (Central (CST))
  - Summer (DST): UTC-5 (CDT)
- ZIP code: 68922
- Area code: 308
- FIPS code: 31-01780
- GNIS feature ID: 2393970
- Website: City of Arapahoe

Arapahoe is a city in Furnas County, in the southern part of the state of Nebraska in the Midwestern United States. As of the 2020 census, Arapahoe had a population of 1,002.

== Geography ==
According to the United States Census Bureau, the city has a total area of 0.99 square miles (2.56 km^{2}), all land.

=== Climate ===
Climate data for Arapahoe, Nebraska (coordinates:40.2463°N 99.9516°W, 1991-2020)
Month	Jan	Feb	Mar	Apr	May	Jun	Jul	Aug	Sep	Oct	Nov	Dec	Year
Average precipitation inches (mm)	0.42 (11)	0.59 (15)	1.17 (30)	2.35 (60)	3.61 (92)	3.49 (89)	3.81 (97)	3.13 (80)	1.79 (45)	1.45 (37)	0.84 (21)	0.41 (10)	23.06 (587)
Source: NOAA

== History ==
In the spring of 1871, the Arapahoe Town Company was formed in Plattsmouth, Nebraska, under the leadership of Captain E. B. Murphy, for the purpose of establishing a settlement in the Republican River valley. The townsite was surveyed on July 18, 1871. It was named for the Arapaho tribe of Native Americans who occupied this area.

A post office was established in Arapahoe in 1872. A sawmill and gristmill were constructed on Muddy Creek, west of the town; the sawmill provided timber for early construction.

In 1873, Furnas County was organized by the state legislature, with Arapahoe designated as the county seat. The designation was challenged by Beaver City; an 1873 county election, followed by extensive litigation, moved the county seat to Beaver City in 1876.

The city's first newspaper was the Pioneer, established in 1879. In 1882, the Arapahoe Public Mirror was established to support the Democratic Party in the county. The Public Mirror is still in operation; in 1924, it absorbed the Holbrook Observer. In 1978, it acquired the Elwood Bulletin, which it continues to publish under that name.

The Arapahoe Telephone Company was established in 1904. In the 1930s, during the Great Depression, a WPA project constructed a swimming pool and solarium at the city park, which had been part of the city's original layout.

== Demographics ==
Historical population
Census	Pop.	Note	%±
1880	470		—
1890	734		56.2%
1900	701		−4.5%
1910	901		28.5%
1920	894		−0.8%
1930	1,017		13.8%
1940	1,002		−1.5%
1950	1,226		22.4%
1960	1,084		−11.6%
1970	1,147		5.8%
1980	1,107		−3.5%
1990	1,001		−9.6%
2000	1,028		2.7%
2010	1,026		−0.2%
2020	1,002		−2.3%
U.S. Decennial Census

=== 2010 census ===
At the 2010 census, there were 1,026 people, 452 households and 258 families residing in the city. The population density was 1,036.4 per square mile (400.2/km^{2}). There were 515 housing units at an average density of 520.2 per square mile (200.9/km^{2}). The racial makeup was 95.2% White, 0.1% African American, 0.6% Native American, 0.3% Asian, 0.1% Pacific Islander, 2.2% from other races, and 1.5% from two or more races. Hispanic or Latino of any race were 4.4% of the population.

There were 452 households, of which 25.7% had children under the age of 18 living with them, 47.1% were married couples living together, 6.9% had a female householder with no husband present, 3.1% had a male householder with no wife present, and 42.9% were non-families. 40.9% of all households were made up of individuals, and 23.7% had someone living alone who was 65 years of age or older. The average household size was 2.21 and the average family size was 2.91.

The median age was 46.3 years. 24% of residents were under the age of 18; 6.2% were between the ages of 18 and 24; 17.9% were from 25 to 44; 28.3% were from 45 to 64; and 23.6% were 65 years of age or older. The gender makeup was 46.4% male and 53.6% female.

=== 2000 census ===
At the 2000 census, there were 1,028 people, 456 households and 280 families residing in the city. The population density was 1,057.1 inhabitants per square mile (408.1/km^{2}). There were 522 housing units at an average density of 536.8 per square mile (207.3/km^{2}). The racial makeup was 97.57% White, 0.29% Native American, 0.58% Asian, 0.39% from other races, and 1.17% from two or more races. Hispanic or Latino of any race were 1.65% of the population.

There were 456 households, of which 26.3% had children under the age of 18 living with them, 52.6% were married couples living together, 6.1% had a female householder with no husband present, and 38.4% were non-families. 36.8% of all households were made up of individuals, and 25.7% had someone living alone who was 65 years of age or older. The average household size was 2.18 and the average family size was 2.86.

23.6% of the population were under the age of 18, 5.1% from 18 to 24, 24.0% from 25 to 44, 18.4% from 45 to 64, and 28.9% who were 65 years of age or older. The median age was 43 years. For every 100 females, there were 74.8 males. For every 100 females age 18 and over, there were 71.4 males.

The median household income was $29,500 and the median family income was $36,750. Males had a median income of $28,365 and females $20,795. The per capita income was $15,191. About 6.1% of families and 9.7% of the population were below the poverty line, including 11.9% of those under age 18 and 11.1% of those age 65 or over.

== Notable person ==
- Arno B. Cammerer, third director of the U.S. National Park Service

== See also ==
- List of municipalities in Nebraska
