= Nebraska Highway 47 =

State highway in Nebraska, U.S.

State Highway 47

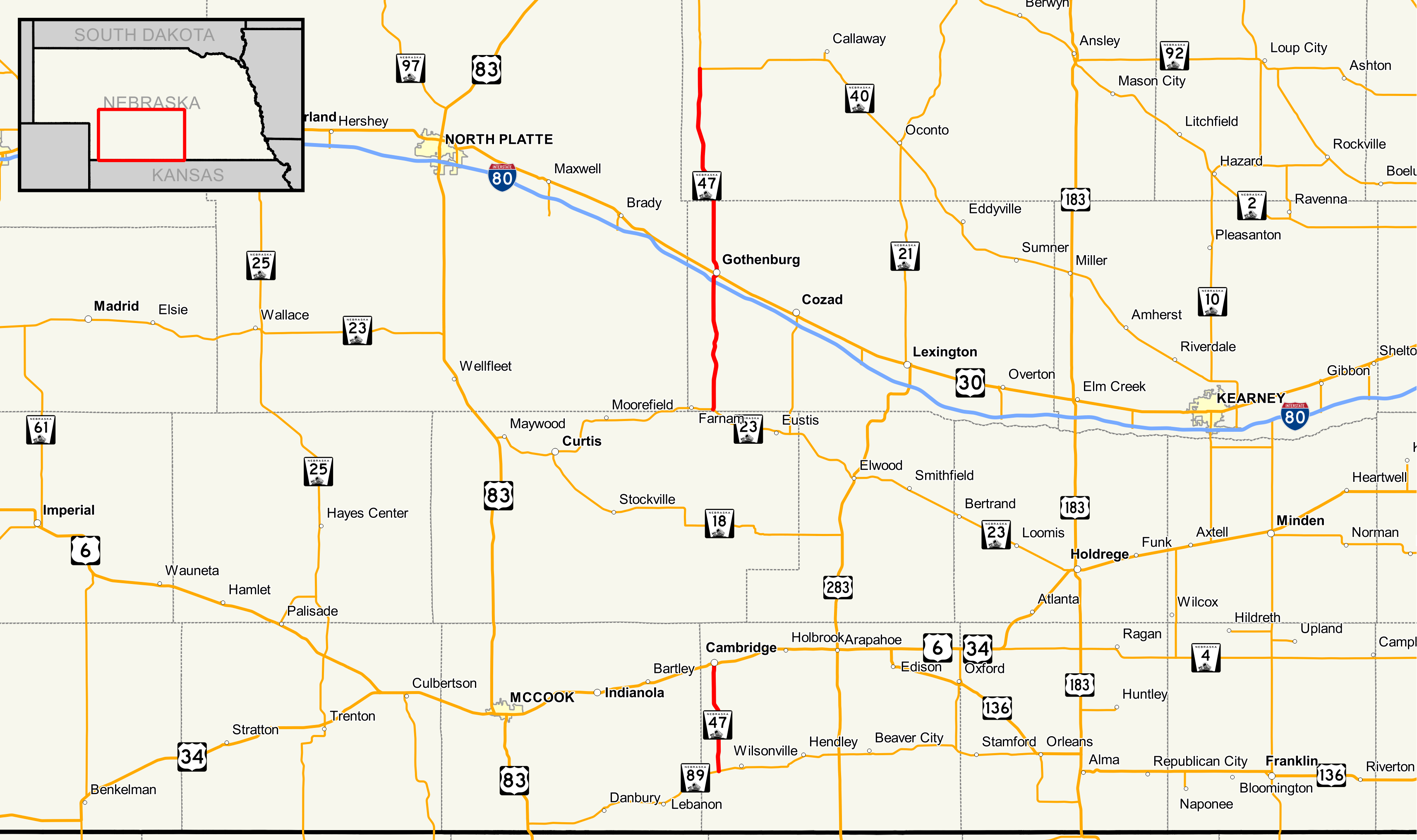
- Nebraska Highway 47 highlighted in red

Route information
- Maintained by NDOT
- Length: 52.14 mi (83.91 km)
- Existed: 1926–present

Southern segment
- Length: 12.45 mi (20.04 km)
- South end: N-89 west of Wilsonville
- North end: US 6 / US 34 in Cambridge

Northern segment
- Length: 39.69 mi (63.87 km)
- South end: N-23 east of Farnam
- Major intersections: I-80 in Gothenburg; US 30 in Gothenburg
- North end: N-40 south of Arnold

Location
- Country: United States
- State: Nebraska
- Counties: Southern segment: Furnas; Northern segment: Dawson, Custer

Highway system
- Nebraska State Highway System; Interstate; US; State; Link; Spur; State Spurs; Recreation
← N-46	→ N-50

Nebraska Highway 47 is a highway in Nebraska. It is a highway split into two segments. The southern segment runs for 12 miles (19 km) between Nebraska Highway 89 near Wilsonville and U.S. Highway 6 and U.S. Highway 34 in Cambridge. The northern segment runs for 40 miles (64 km) between Nebraska Highway 23 near Farnam and Nebraska Highway 40 south of Arnold.

== Route description ==
=== Southern segment ===
Nebraska Highway 47 begins west of Wilsonville at an intersection with Nebraska Highway 89. It runs north through farmland into Cambridge and ends at an intersection with U.S. 6 and U.S. 34.

=== Northern segment ===
The northern segment of Nebraska Highway 47 begins east of Farnam at an intersection with Nebraska Highway 23. It goes north through farmland and meets Interstate 80 in Gothenburg shortly after crossing the Platte River. Also in Gothenburg, Highway 47 connects to U.S. Highway 30 via a short connecting link. Highway 47 continues north of Gothenburg and ends south of Arnold at an intersection with Nebraska Highway 40.

== Major intersections ==
=== Southern segment ===
The entire route is in Furnas County.

Location	mi	km	Destinations	Notes
Wilsonville	0.00	0.00	N-89	Southern terminus of southern segment
Cambridge	12.45	20.04	US 6 / US 34 (Nasby Street)	Northern terminus of southern segment
1.000 mi = 1.609 km; 1.000 km = 0.621 mi

=== Northern segment ===
County	Location	mi	km	Destinations	Notes
Dawson	Farnam	46.45	74.75	N-23	Southern terminus of northern segment
Dawson	Gothenburg	61.23	98.54	I-80	I-80 exit 211
Dawson	Gothenburg	62.54	100.65	L-24D (11th Street) to US 30	
Custer		86.14	138.63	N-40	Northern terminus of northern segment
1.000 mi = 1.609 km; 1.000 km = 0.621 mi
