= Hendley, Nebraska =

Village in Furas County, Nebraska, United States

- Village
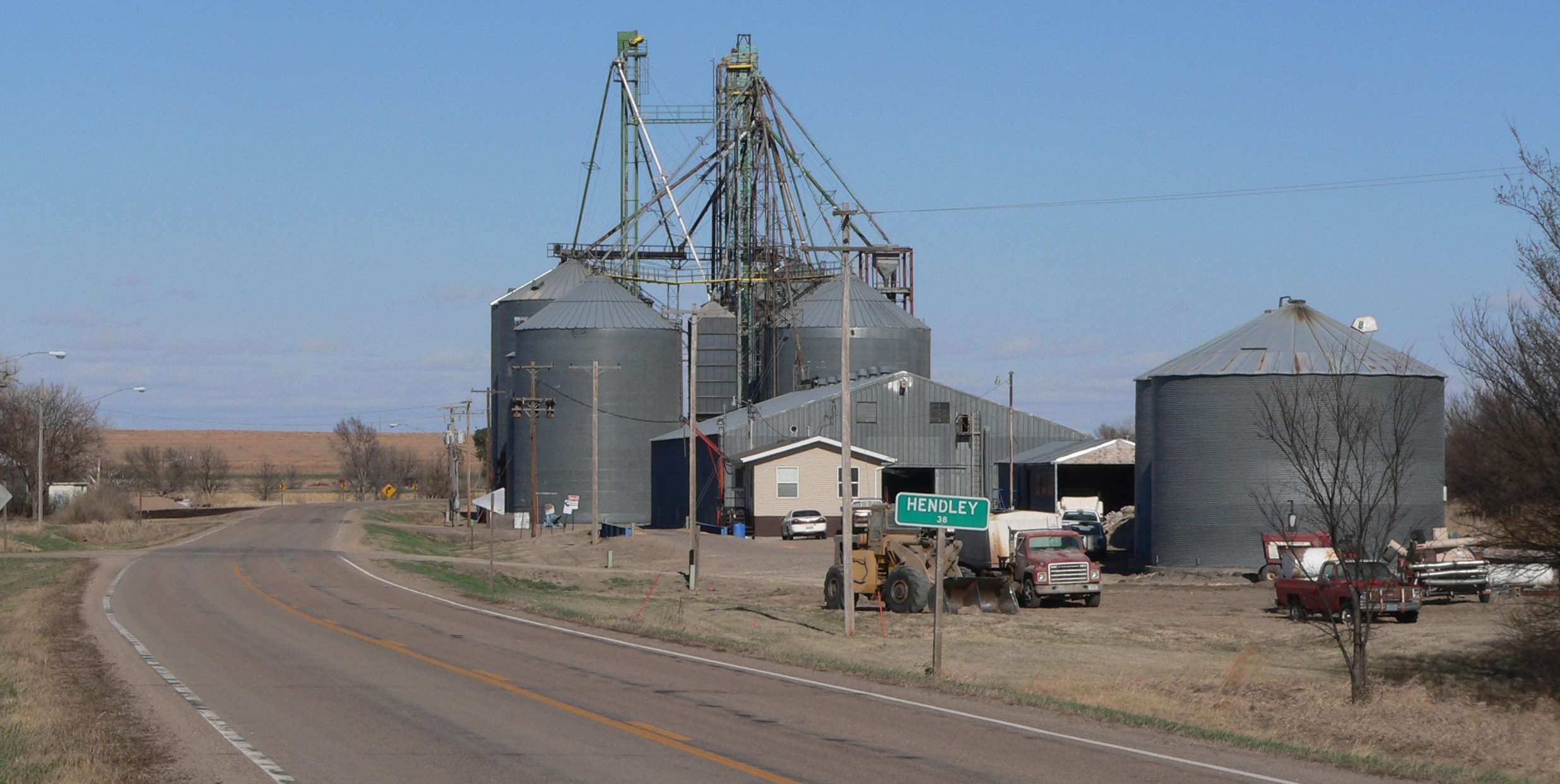
- Hendley, seen from Nebraska Highway 89

- Location of Hendley, Nebraska
- Coordinates: 40°07′53″N 99°58′16″W
- Country: United States
- State: Nebraska
- County: Furnas

Area
  - Total: 0.21 sq mi (0.55 km^{2})
  - Land: 0.21 sq mi (0.55 km^{2})
  - Water: 0 sq mi (0.00 km^{2})
- Elevation: 2,234 ft (681 m)

Population (2020)
  - Total: 20
  - Density: 94.1/sq mi (36.33/km^{2})
- Time zone: UTC-6 (Central (CST))
  - Summer (DST): UTC-5 (CDT)
- ZIP code: 68946
- Area code: 308
- FIPS code: 31-22115
- GNIS feature ID: 2398488

Hendley is a village in Furnas County, Nebraska, United States. The population was 20 at the 2020 census.

== History ==
Hendley was named by the railroad in 1887 when they built a new line to a small settlement called Lyndon that had existed since the 1870s.

A post office was established in Hendley in 1888 and, while no longer in a standalone building, remains in operation within the small convenience store located on the southeast corner of Grant Avenue and 3rd Street.

== Geography ==
According to the United States Census Bureau, the village has a total area of 0.21 square miles (0.54 km^{2}), all land.

== Demographics ==
Historical population
| Census | Pop. | Note | %± |
|---|---|---|---|
| 1910 | 238 | | — |
| 1920 | 200 | | −16.0% |
| 1930 | 211 | | 5.5% |
| 1940 | 147 | | −30.3% |
| 1950 | 130 | | −11.6% |
| 1960 | 79 | | −39.2% |
| 1970 | 58 | | −26.6% |
| 1980 | 39 | | −32.8% |
| 1990 | 42 | | 7.7% |
| 2000 | 38 | | −9.5% |
| 2010 | 24 | | −36.8% |
| 2020 | 20 | | −16.7% |
U.S. Decennial Census

=== 2010 census ===
As of the census of 2010, there were 24 people, 14 households, and 4 families residing in the village. The population density was 114.3 inhabitants per square mile (44.1/km^{2}). There were 22 housing units at an average density of 104.8 per square mile (40.5/km^{2}). The racial makeup of the village was 100.0% White.

There were 14 households, of which 28.6% were married couples living together and 71.4% were non-families. 50.0% of all households were made up of individuals, and 7.1% had someone living alone who was 65 years of age or older. The average household size was 1.71 and the average family size was 2.50.

The median age in the village was 56 years. 8.3% of residents were under the age of 18; 0.1% were between the ages of 18 and 24; 12.6% were from 25 to 44; 54.2% were from 45 to 64; and 25% were 65 years of age or older. The gender makeup of the village was 66.7% male and 33.3% female.

=== 2000 census ===
As of the census of 2000, there were 38 people, 16 households, and 9 families residing in the village. The population density was 179.2 inhabitants per square mile (69.2/km^{2}). There were 22 housing units at an average density of 103.8 per square mile (40.1/km^{2}). The racial makeup of the village was 92.11% White, 5.26% from other races, and 2.63% from two or more races. Hispanic or Latino of any race were 7.89% of the population.

There were 16 households, out of which 25.0% had children under the age of 18 living with them, 50.0% were married couples living together, 6.3% had a female householder with no husband present, and 43.8% were non-families. 37.5% of all households were made up of individuals, and 18.8% had someone living alone who was 65 years of age or older. The average household size was 2.38 and the average family size was 3.22.

In the village, the population was spread out, with 23.7% under the age of 18, 10.5% from 18 to 24, 26.3% from 25 to 44, 26.3% from 45 to 64, and 13.2% who were 65 years of age or older. The median age was 41 years. For every 100 females, there were 81.0 males. For every 100 females age 18 and over, there were 107.1 males.

As of 2000 the median income for a household in the village was $30,000, and the median income for a family was $48,750. Males had a median income of $50,625 versus $13,750 for females. The per capita income for the village was $13,550. There were 33.3% of families and 26.5% of the population living below the poverty line, including 30.8% of under eighteens and none of those over 64.

== See also ==
- List of municipalities in Nebraska
