= Precept, Nebraska =

Unincorporated community in Nebraska, U.S.

Coordinates: 40°04′04″N 99°43′59″W

Precept is an unincorporated community in Furnas County, Nebraska, United States.

== History ==
A post office was established in Precept in 1877, and remained in operation until it was discontinued in 1906.
