= Furnas County, Nebraska =

County in Nebraska, United States

- County
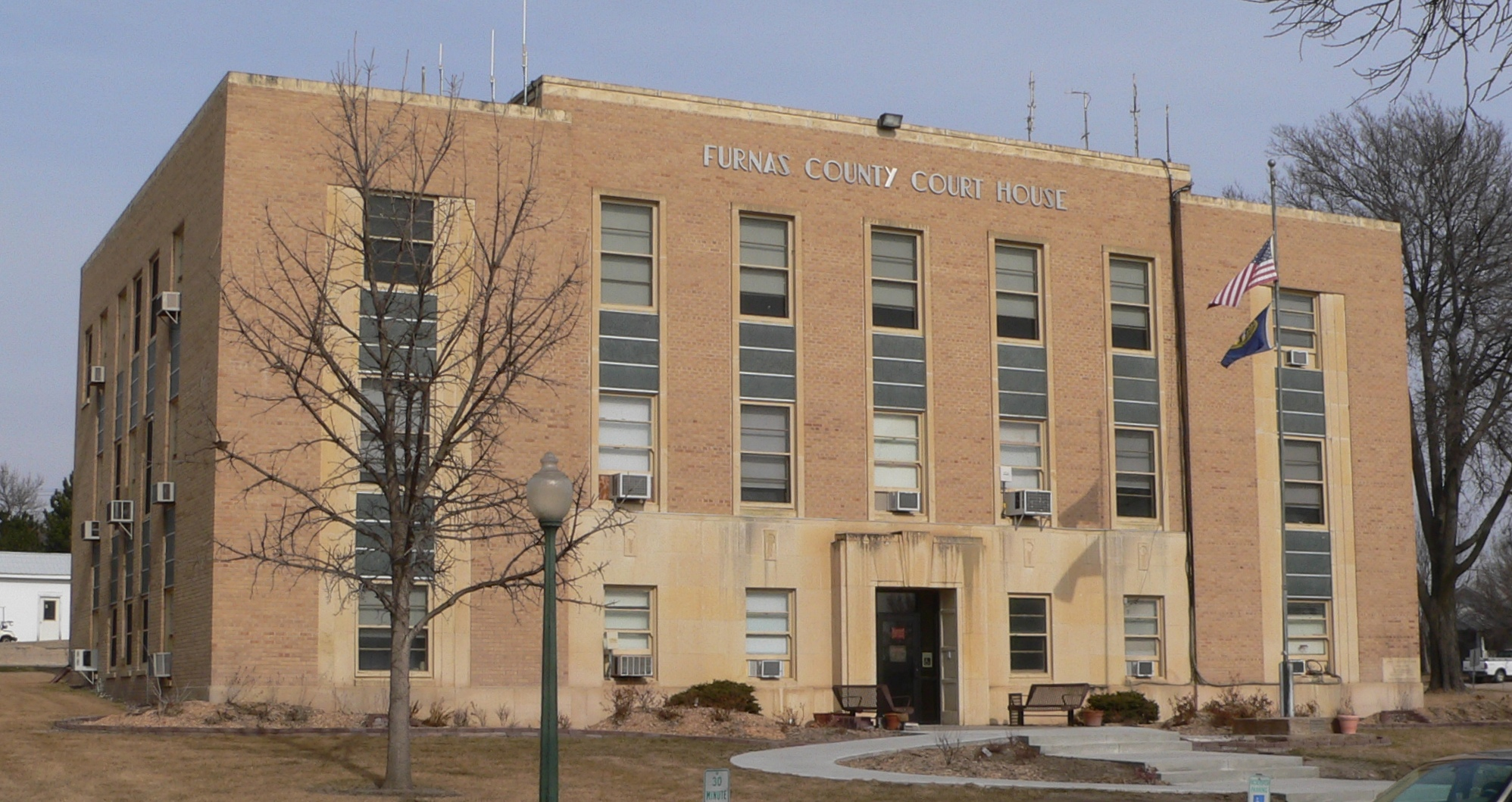
- Furnas County Courthouse in Beaver City

- Location within the U.S. state of Nebraska
- Coordinates: 40°10′N 99°55′W
- Country: United States
- State: Nebraska
- Founded: 1873
- Named for: Robert W. Furnas
- Seat: Beaver City
- Largest city: Cambridge

Area
  - Total: 721 sq mi (1,870 km^{2})
  - Land: 719 sq mi (1,860 km^{2})
  - Water: 1.5 sq mi (3.9 km^{2}) 0.2%

Population (2020)
  - Total: 4,636
  - Estimate (2025): 4,524 ▼
  - Density: 6.6/sq mi (2.5/km^{2})
- Time zone: UTC−6 (Central)
  - Summer (DST): UTC−5 (CDT)
- Congressional district: 3rd
- Website: www.furnascounty.ne.gov

Furnas County is a county in the U.S. state of Nebraska. As of the 2020 United States census, the population was 4,636. Its county seat is Beaver City. The county was named for Robert Wilkinson Furnas, the second governor of the state of Nebraska.

In the Nebraska license plate system, Furnas County is represented by the prefix 38 (it had the thirty-eighth-largest number of vehicles registered in the county when the license plate system was established in 1922).

== Geography ==
Furnas County lies on the south line of Nebraska. The south boundary line of Furnas County abuts the north boundary line of the state of Kansas. The Republican River flows eastward across the upper central part of the county.

According to the US Census Bureau, the county has an area of 721 square miles (1,870 km^{2}), of which 719 square miles (1,860 km^{2}) is land and 1.5 square miles (3.9 km^{2}) (0.2%) is water.

=== Major highways ===
- U.S. Highway 6
- U.S. Highway 34
- U.S. Highway 136
- U.S. Highway 283
- Nebraska Highway 46
- Nebraska Highway 47
- Nebraska Highway 89

=== Adjacent counties ===
- Harlan County – east
- Norton County, Kansas – south
- Decatur County, Kansas – southwest
- Red Willow County – west
- Frontier County – northwest
- Gosper County – north
- Phelps County – northeast

== Demographics ==
Historical population
Census	Pop.	Note	%±
1880	6,407		—
1890	9,840		53.6%
1900	12,373		25.7%
1910	12,083		−2.3%
1920	11,657		−3.5%
1930	12,140		4.1%
1940	10,098		−16.8%
1950	9,385		−7.1%
1960	7,711		−17.8%
1970	6,897		−10.6%
1980	6,486		−6.0%
1990	5,553		−14.4%
2000	5,324		−4.1%
2010	4,959		−6.9%
2020	4,636		−6.5%
2025 (est.)	4,524	▼	−2.4%
US Decennial Census; 1790-1960 1900-1990; 1990-2000 2010-2013

=== 2020 census ===
As of the 2020 census, the county had a population of 4,636. The median age was 46.3 years. 22.5% of residents were under the age of 18 and 25.1% of residents were 65 years of age or older. For every 100 females there were 102.4 males, and for every 100 females age 18 and over there were 100.7 males age 18 and over.

The racial makeup of the county was 92.6% White, 0.2% Black or African American, 0.7% American Indian and Alaska Native, 0.1% Asian, 0.0% Native Hawaiian and Pacific Islander, 1.6% from some other race, and 4.8% from two or more races. Hispanic or Latino residents of any race comprised 4.7% of the population.

0.0% of residents lived in urban areas, while 100.0% lived in rural areas.

There were 2,049 households in the county, of which 25.6% had children under the age of 18 living with them and 23.3% had a female householder with no spouse or partner present. About 33.4% of all households were made up of individuals and 18.3% had someone living alone who was 65 years of age or older.

There were 2,518 housing units, of which 18.6% were vacant. Among occupied housing units, 73.2% were owner-occupied and 26.8% were renter-occupied. The homeowner vacancy rate was 3.4% and the rental vacancy rate was 12.3%.

=== 2000 census ===
As of the 2000 United States census, there were 5,324 people, 2,278 households, and 1,489 families in the county. The population density was 7 people per square mile (2.7 people/km^{2}). There were 2,730 housing units at an average density of 4 units per square mile (1.5/km^{2}). The racial makeup of the county was 98.22% White, 0.08% Black or African American, 0.41% Native American, 0.23% Asian, 0.32% from other races, and 0.75% from two or more races. 1.15% of the population were Hispanic or Latino of any race. 45.6% were of German, 13.8% American, 11.4% English, 7.4% Irish and 5.2% Swedish ancestry.

There were 2,278 households, out of which 28.00% had children under the age of 18 living with them, 57.20% were married couples living together, 5.90% had a female householder with no husband present, and 34.60% were non-families. 32.50% of all households were made up of individuals, and 19.80% had someone living alone who was 65 years of age or older. The average household size was 2.28 and the average family size was 2.88.

The county population contained 24.10% under the age of 18, 5.30% from 18 to 24, 22.80% from 25 to 44, 23.90% from 45 to 64, and 23.80% who were 65 years of age or older. The median age was 44 years. For every 100 females there were 92.30 males. For every 100 females age 18 and over, there were 88.00 males.

The median income for a household in the county was $30,498, and the median income for a family was $37,000. Males had a median income of $26,563 versus $19,918 for females. The per capita income for the county was $17,223. About 6.90% of families and 10.60% of the population were below the poverty line, including 14.50% of those under age 18 and 10.50% of those age 65 or over.

== Communities ==
=== Cities ===
- Arapahoe
- Beaver City (county seat)
- Cambridge

=== Villages ===
- Edison
- Hendley
- Holbrook
- Oxford (partial)
- Wilsonville

=== Unincorporated communities ===
- Hollinger
- Precept

== Politics ==
Furnas County voters have been strongly Republican since its beginning. In only one national election since 1916 the county been carried by a Democratic Party presidential candidate.

United States presidential election results for Furnas County, Nebraska
Year	Republican		Democratic		Third party(ies)	
Year	No.	%	No.	%	No.	%
1900	1,321	48.85%	1,319	48.78%	64	2.37%
1904	1,569	61.72%	393	15.46%	580	22.82%
1908	1,400	44.80%	1,618	51.78%	107	3.42%
1912	354	13.79%	1,266	49.32%	947	36.89%
1916	1,163	40.45%	1,607	55.90%	105	3.65%
1920	2,445	60.53%	1,371	33.94%	223	5.52%
1924	2,378	50.30%	1,534	32.45%	816	17.26%
1928	3,760	73.17%	1,339	26.06%	40	0.78%
1932	2,087	38.10%	3,303	60.31%	87	1.59%
1936	2,842	52.40%	2,482	45.76%	100	1.84%
1940	3,316	64.85%	1,797	35.15%	0	0.00%
1944	2,870	68.35%	1,329	31.65%	0	0.00%
1948	2,258	60.18%	1,494	39.82%	0	0.00%
1952	3,464	77.29%	1,018	22.71%	0	0.00%
1956	2,894	72.26%	1,111	27.74%	0	0.00%
1960	2,854	72.34%	1,091	27.66%	0	0.00%
1964	2,011	54.65%	1,669	45.35%	0	0.00%
1968	2,137	69.81%	701	22.90%	223	7.29%
1972	2,282	77.15%	676	22.85%	0	0.00%
1976	1,851	60.21%	1,132	36.82%	91	2.96%
1980	2,483	78.28%	536	16.90%	153	4.82%
1984	2,363	79.67%	579	19.52%	24	0.81%
1988	1,830	69.19%	791	29.91%	24	0.91%
1992	1,365	48.73%	624	22.28%	812	28.99%
1996	1,475	61.18%	663	27.50%	273	11.32%
2000	1,849	76.06%	534	21.97%	48	1.97%
2004	1,950	79.04%	492	19.94%	25	1.01%
2008	1,725	74.10%	556	23.88%	47	2.02%
2012	1,782	79.55%	423	18.88%	35	1.56%
2016	1,921	82.09%	304	12.99%	115	4.91%
2020	2,163	83.13%	399	15.33%	40	1.54%
2024	2,043	84.46%	358	14.80%	18	0.74%

== See also ==
- National Register of Historic Places listings in Furnas County NE
- Medicine Creek (Republican River tributary)
