= USS Marts =

Cannon-class destroyer escort

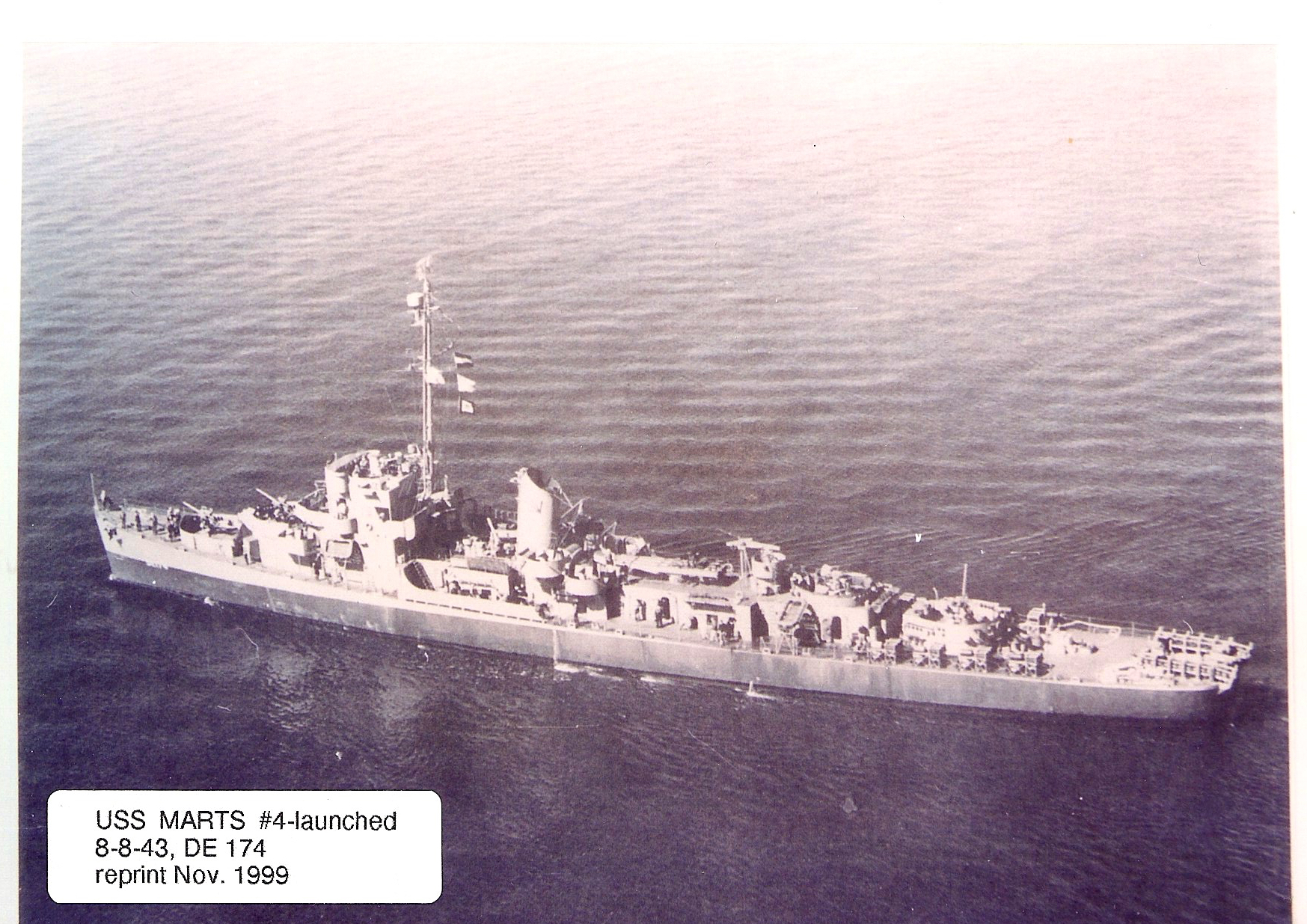

History

United States
- Name: USS Marts
- Namesake: Alvin Lee Marts
- Builder: Federal Shipbuilding and Drydock Company, Newark, New Jersey
- Laid down: 26 April 1943
- Launched: 8 August 1943
- Commissioned: 3 September 1943
- Decommissioned: 20 March 1945
- Stricken: 20 July 1953
- Fate: Transferred to Brazil, 20 March 1945

History

Brazil
- Name: Bocaina (D-22)
- Commissioned: 20 March 1945
- Stricken: 1975
- Fate: Sold for scrap, 1975

General characteristics
- Class & type: Cannon-class destroyer escort
- Displacement: 1,240 long tons (1,260 t) standard; 1,620 long tons (1,646 t) full
- Length: 306 ft (93 m) o/a; 300 ft (91 m) w/l
- Beam: 36 ft 10 in (11.23 m)
- Draft: 11 ft 8 in (3.56 m)
- Propulsion: 4 × GM Mod. 16-278A diesel engines with electric drive, 6,000 shp (4,474 kW), 2 screws
- Speed: 21 knots (39 km/h; 24 mph)
- Range: 10,800 nmi (20,000 km) at 12 kn (22 km/h; 14 mph)
- Complement: 15 officers and 201 enlisted
- Armament: 3 × single Mk.22 3"/50 caliber guns; 1 × twin 40 mm Mk.1 AA gun; 8 × 20 mm Mk.4 AA guns; 3 × 21-inch (533 mm) torpedo tubes; 1 × Hedgehog Mk.10 anti-submarine mortar (144 rounds); 8 × Mk.6 depth charge projectors; 2 × Mk.9 depth charge tracks

USS Marts (DE-174) was a Cannon-class destroyer escort built for the United States Navy. She served in the Atlantic Ocean in 1943-45 before being transferred to the Brazilian Navy. Renamed Bocaina (D-22), she was in service until 1975, when she was struck and scrapped.

== Namesake ==
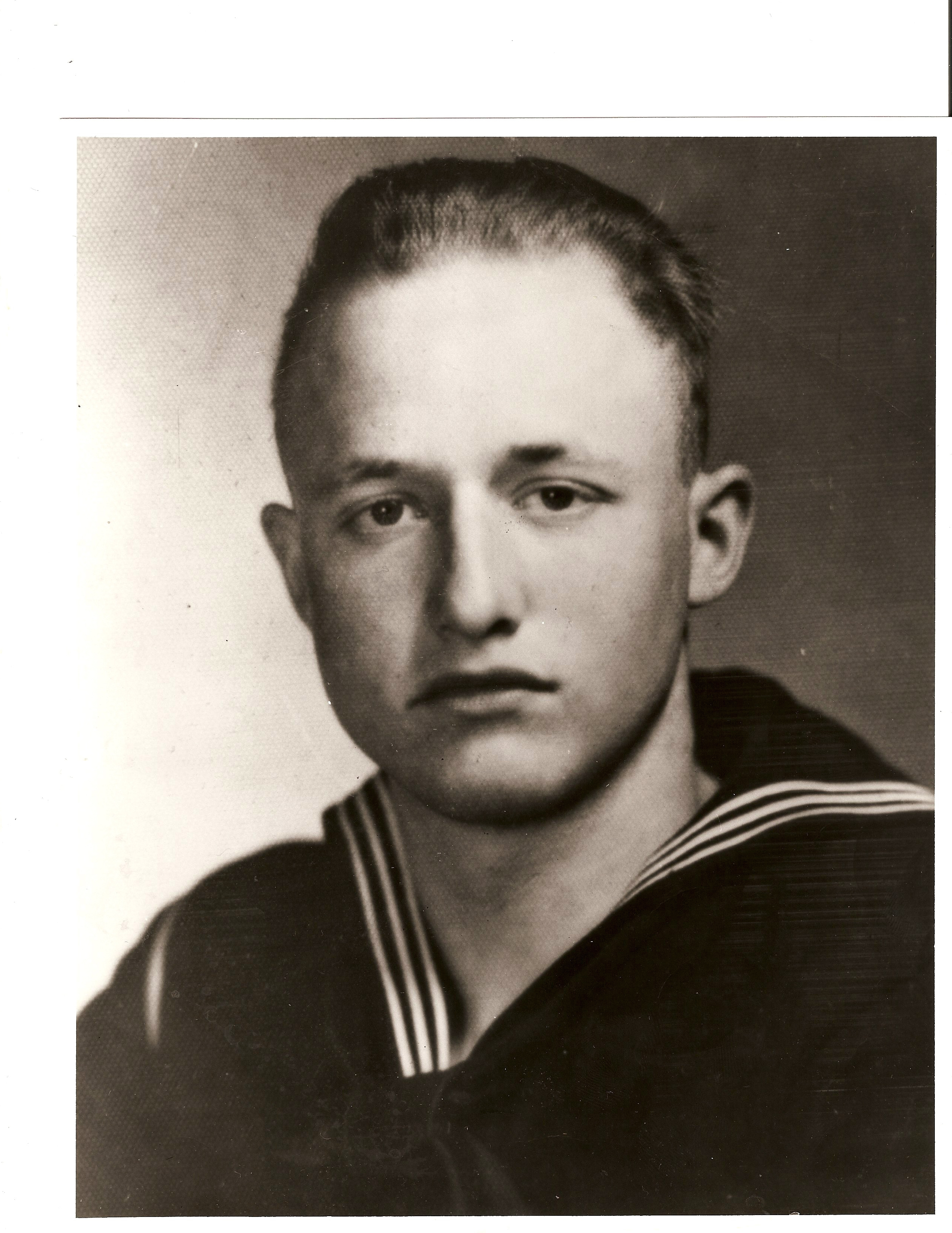
Alvin Lee Marts

Alvin Lee Marts was born on 4 August 1923 at Wilsonville, Nebraska. He enlisted in the Navy at Denver, Colorado on 2 July 1941. He served on USS Yorktown and survived its following the Battle of Midway. Transferred to USS New Orleans he served as a fireman, second class. Early in the Battle of Tassafaronga, New Orleans took a torpedo hit in its port bow which exploded two magazines and blew off the forward part of the ship back to No. 2 turret. Assigned to the forward battle repair party, Marts was gravely injured by the blast and fires. However he assisted in carrying an injured medical officer to the battle dressing station amidships where he collapsed from loss of blood and exhaustion. He died from his wounds shortly afterward. He was posthumously awarded the Navy Cross.

== History ==
The ship was laid down by Federal Shipbuilding & Dry Dock Co., Newark, New Jersey, on 26 April 1943; launched on 8 August 1943; sponsored by Miss Betty Marts; and, commissioned on 3 September 1943.

=== U.S. Navy (1943–1945) ===
After shakedown off Bermuda, Marts departed New York on 4 November for convoy escort duty off the Atlantic coast of South America. She reached Trinidad, British West Indies, on 9 November, and during the next five months operated in the 4th Fleet escorting ships between Trinidad and Recife, Brazil. As escort for Omaha (CL-4), she departed Bahia, Brazil, on 23 May 1944 and patrolled the mid-Atlantic, south of the Equator, in search of German U-boats, until returning to Bahia on 5 June. She made two more patrols during the next month; and, after escorting Omaha to Gibraltar on 13 July, she returned to Recife the 23rd.

Between 24 July and 3 August Marts screened the British cable repair ship SS Cambria during repairs on communications cables off the Brazilian coast. Thence, she joined Escort Division 24 on hunter-killer patrols in the Atlantic. Operating with Tripoli (CVE-64), she made four offensive ASW patrols out of Recife between 22 August and 12 November. After completing sonar repairs at Bahia, Brazil, she sailed to Trinidad, where she arrived on 5 December to resume convoy escort duty. From 6 to 18 December she screened a merchant convoy to Recife; thence, she continued escort duty between Brazilian Ports and Trinidad until the end of January 1945.

Marts joined Cincinnati (CL-6) at Bahia on 1 February and escorted the cruiser on patrol in the South Atlantic until returning to Recife on 10 February.

=== Brazilian Navy (1945–1975) ===
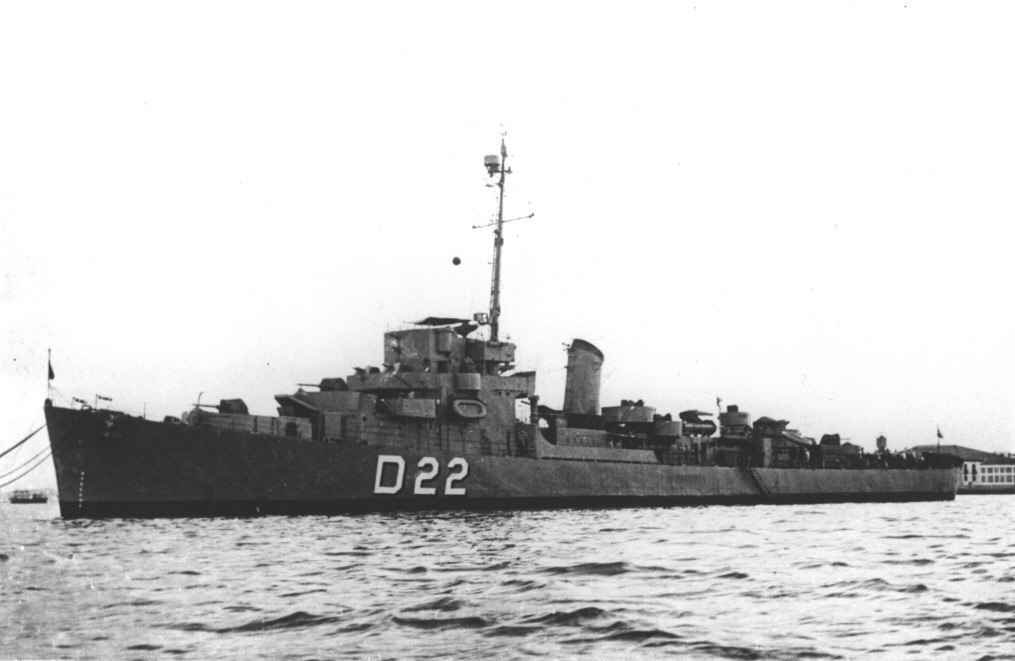
Marts as the Brazilian Bocaina.

Scheduled for transfer under lend lease to the Brazilian government, she steamed to the Brazilian naval base at Natal on 2 March, and there trained Brazilian sailors. Marts decommissioned on 20 March 1945 and recommissioned the same day in the Brazilian Navy as Bocaina (D-22). On 30 June 1953, she was returned to the United States and simultaneously transferred outright to Brazil under terms of the Mutual Defense Assistance Program. She continued to serve in the Brazilian Navy until struck and scrapped in 1975.
