= Dorothy Grebenak =

American artist

- Grebenak, circa 1964
- Born: June 3, 1913; Oxford, Nebraska, United States
- Died: June 13, 1990 (aged 77); London, United Kingdom
- Known for: Pop art
- Spouse: Louis Grebenak (d. 1971)

Dorothy Grebenak (June 3, 1913 – June 13, 1990) was an American pop artist. Largely self-taught, she is known for her large, hand-hooked wool rugs of familiar subjects, such as baseball trading cards, Tide boxes, and dollar bills.

== Bio ==
Grebenak was born in Oxford, Nebraska of Irish descent. Her husband Louis, also an artist, was a Works Progress Administration printmaker who later turned to Hard-edge painting. The couple lived in Park Slope, Brooklyn until 1971. Grebenak taught high school and studied dance. By 1948 she was making rugs which she initially sold in the shop at the Brooklyn Museum. Her hooked rugs differed from contemporary craft artists' fiber art in two significant ways: first, their pop imagery made them more fine than folk art; second, they were intended not for use on the floor, but to be hung on the wall as a painting would be.

In 1963 and 1964, Grebenak had two solo exhibitions at Allan Stone Gallery, through which her rugs entered the private collections of major art collectors, including Nelson Rockefeller, Albert and Vera List, William and Norma Copley, Carter Burden, and John and Kimiko Powers. Her work was featured in various group exhibitions and was included in the Milwaukee Art Museum's Pop Art and the American Tradition exhibition in 1965. Her work was featured in a leading national magazine in the late sixties, with an illustration of her "Man-hole cover" rug. She wove a blanket and small rugs as gifts to her grand nephew and grand nieces. She used wool colored with natural dyes.

Despite her modest critical and commercial success at mid-century, Grebenak all but disappeared from the art world soon thereafter. Many of her rugs, too, have either vanished or fallen apart over time. After her husband's death in 1971, she relocated to London where she died in 1990.

== Career ==
"Grebenak was known for her hand-hooked rugs featuring bold graphic imagery inspired by Pop Art and American iconography. Her works often depicted logos, currency, and other cultural symbols, aligning her with the Pop Art movement of the 1960s. Some of her most notable works include 'NRA Tapestry (National Recovery Administration)' (1963) and 'Two-Dollar Bill' (1964), which exemplify her approach to textile-based art."

"While she gained recognition in the 1960s, her work was later rediscovered. In 2010, her rugs were included in 'Seductive Subversion: Women Pop Artists, 1958–1968' at the Brooklyn Museum, an exhibition that aimed to highlight overlooked women in the Pop Art movement."

== Bibliography ==
1. Sid Sachs and Kalliopi Minioudaki, Seductive Subversion: Women Pop Artists, 1958-1968. Philadelphia, PA: University of the Arts, Philadelphia, 2010.
2. Jean Lipman, "Money for Money's Sake," Art in America v. 58 (January 1970), pp. 76–79.
3. Rita Reif, "There's a Nude Sitting On the Lists' Piano," The New York Times, March 5, 1966, p. 39.
