= Holbrook, Nebraska =

- Village
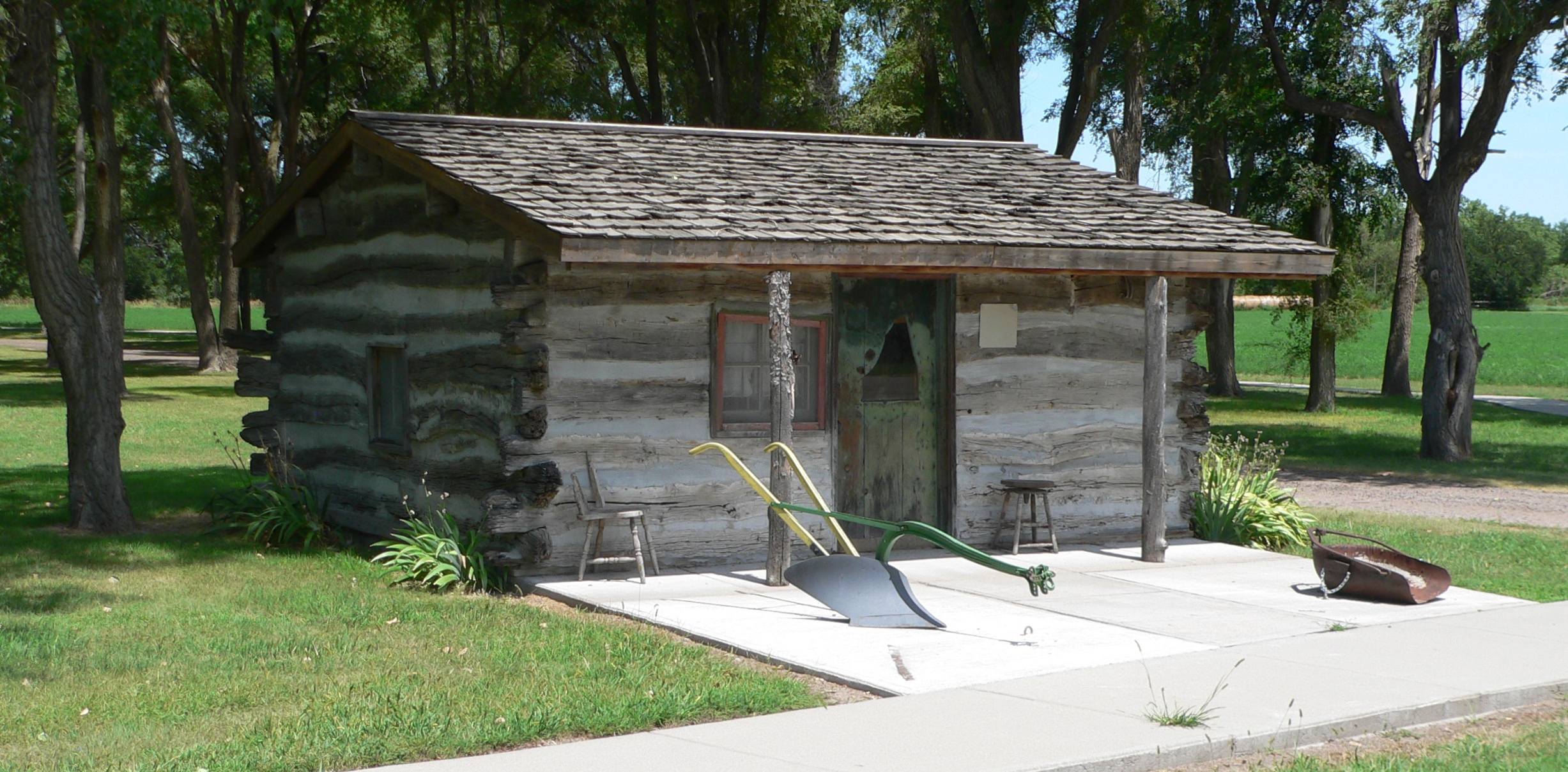
- Log cabin in Holbrook Park

- Location of Holbrook, Nebraska
- Coordinates: 40°18′17″N 100°00′36″W
- Country: United States
- State: Nebraska
- County: Furnas

Area
  - Total: 0.16 sq mi (0.42 km^{2})
  - Land: 0.16 sq mi (0.42 km^{2})
  - Water: 0 sq mi (0.00 km^{2})
- Elevation: 2,211 ft (674 m)

Population (2020)
  - Total: 201
  - Density: 1,246.7/sq mi (481.37/km^{2})
- Time zone: UTC-6 (Central (CST))
  - Summer (DST): UTC-5 (CDT)
- ZIP code: 68948
- Area code: 308
- FIPS code: 31-22605
- GNIS feature ID: 2398520

Holbrook is a village in Furnas County, Nebraska, United States. The population was 201 at the 2020 census.

== History ==
Holbrook was originally called Burton's Bend. When the railroad was built through the neighborhood circa 1880, the settlement was renamed Holbrook after a railroad official.

== Geography ==
According to the United States Census Bureau, the village has a total area of 0.16 square miles (0.41 km^{2}), all land.

== Demographics ==
Historical population
| Census | Pop. | Note | %± |
|---|---|---|---|
| 1910 | 414 | | — |
| 1920 | 455 | | 9.9% |
| 1930 | 488 | | 7.3% |
| 1940 | 441 | | −9.6% |
| 1950 | 398 | | −9.8% |
| 1960 | 354 | | −11.1% |
| 1970 | 307 | | −13.3% |
| 1980 | 297 | | −3.3% |
| 1990 | 233 | | −21.5% |
| 2000 | 225 | | −3.4% |
| 2010 | 207 | | −8.0% |
| 2020 | 201 | | −2.9% |
U.S. Decennial Census

=== 2020 census ===
As of the census of 2020, there were 201 people and 117 families residing in the village. The population density was 1,293.8 inhabitants per square mile (499.5/km^{2}). There were 108 housing units at an average density of 806.3 per square mile (311.3/km^{2}). The racial makeup of the village was 91.0% White and 2.99% from two or more races. Hispanic or Latino of any race were 5.98% of the population.

There were 117 households, of which 33.3% had children under the age of 18 living with them, 67.6% were married or cohabitating couples living together, 14.5% had a female householder with no spouse present, 17.9% had a male householder with no spouse present. 14.5% of all households were made up of individuals, and 7.6% had someone living alone who was 65 years of age or older. The average household size was 2.30 and the average family size was 2.56.

The median age in the village was 50.1 years, with 27.9% of the population being 65 years or older.

The median household income as of 2020 was $60,750, with 27.9% of the village living in poverty. 15.8% of the population held at least a Bachelor's degree, with 49.7% of the population holding a high school or equivalent degree.

=== 2010 census ===
As of the census of 2010, there were 207 people, 90 households, and 56 families residing in the village. The population density was 1,293.8 inhabitants per square mile (499.5/km^{2}). There were 129 housing units at an average density of 806.3 per square mile (311.3/km^{2}). The racial makeup of the village was 97.6% White, 0.5% Native American, 1.0% from other races, and 1.0% from two or more races. Hispanic or Latino of any race were 6.8% of the population.

There were 90 households, of which 27.8% had children under the age of 18 living with them, 45.6% were married couples living together, 10.0% had a female householder with no husband present, 6.7% had a male householder with no wife present, and 37.8% were non-families. 25.6% of all households were made up of individuals, and 7.8% had someone living alone who was 65 years of age or older. The average household size was 2.30 and the average family size was 2.79.

The median age in the village was 43.8 years. 20.8% of residents were under the age of 18; 7.2% were between the ages of 18 and 24; 23.1% were from 25 to 44; 30.4% were from 45 to 64; and 18.4% were 65 years of age or older. The gender makeup of the village was 49.3% male and 50.7% female.

=== 2000 census ===
As of the census of 2000, there were 225 people, 100 households, and 65 families residing in the village. The population density was 1,119 inhabitants per square mile (432/km^{2}). There were 124 housing units at an average density of 617 per square mile (238/km^{2}). The racial makeup of the village was 96.44% White, 0.44% Native American, 0.89% Asian, 0.44% from other races, and 1.78% from two or more races. Hispanic or Latino of any race were 1.33% of the population.

There were 100 households, out of which 23.0% had children under the age of 18 living with them, 51.0% were married couples living together, 7.0% had a female householder with no husband present, and 35.0% were non-families. 31.0% of all households were made up of individuals, and 17.0% had someone living alone who was 65 years of age or older. The average household size was 2.25 and the average family size was 2.83.

In the village, the population was spread out, with 20.9% under the age of 18, 7.6% from 18 to 24, 20.4% from 25 to 44, 28.9% from 45 to 64, and 22.2% who were 65 years of age or older. The median age was 46 years. For every 100 females, there were 120.6 males. For every 100 females age 18 and over, there were 109.4 males.

As of 2000 the median income for a household in the village was $25,313, and the median income for a family was $30,875. Males had a median income of $19,000 versus $16,250 for females. The per capita income for the village was $11,588. About 12.3% of families and 18.6% of the population were below the poverty line, including 34.8% of those under the age of eighteen and 5.1% of those 65 or over.
