= Wilsonville, Nebraska =

- Village
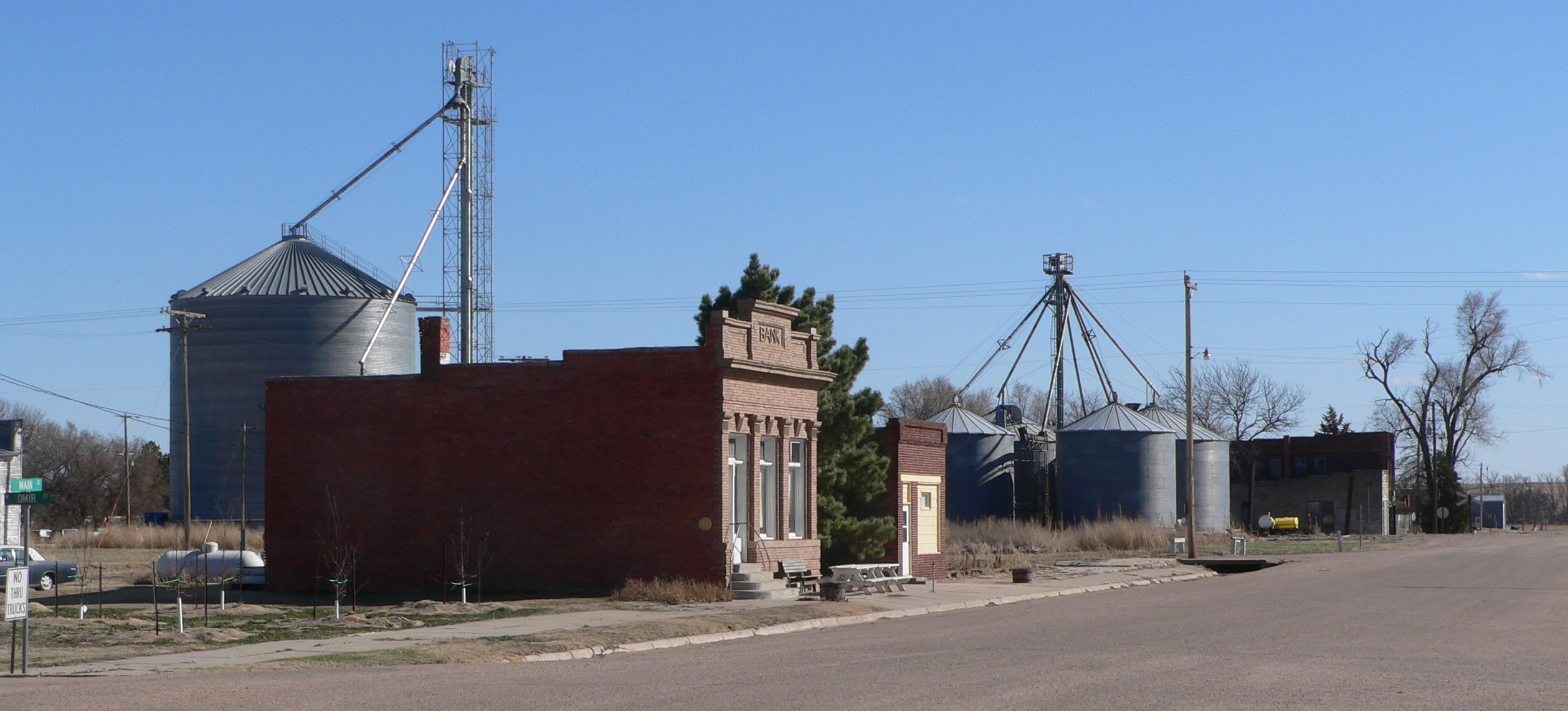
- Downtown Wilsonville

- Location of Wilsonville, Nebraska
- Coordinates: 40°06′43″N 100°06′24″W
- Country: United States
- State: Nebraska
- County: Furnas

Area
  - Total: 0.27 sq mi (0.69 km^{2})
  - Land: 0.27 sq mi (0.69 km^{2})
  - Water: 0 sq mi (0.00 km^{2})
- Elevation: 2,300 ft (700 m)

Population (2020)
  - Total: 75
  - Density: 280.9/sq mi (108.47/km^{2})
- Time zone: UTC-6 (Central (CST))
  - Summer (DST): UTC-5 (CDT)
- ZIP code: 69046
- Area code: 308
- FIPS code: 31-53240
- GNIS feature ID: 2399710

Wilsonville is a village in Furnas County, Nebraska, United States. As of the 2020 census, the village had a population of 75.

== History ==
Wilsonville was first settled in 1872 under the name “Wild Turkey”. A post office was established on April 18, 1873. On December 16, 1873, the name was officially changed from Wild Turkey to Wilsonville in honor of L.M. and Carlos Wilson, two brothers that were merchants and stockman.

== Geography ==
According to the United States Census Bureau, the village has a total area of 0.27 square miles (0.70 km^{2}), all land.

=== Climate ===
Climate data for Wilsonville, Nebraska (1991-2020)
Month	Jan	Feb	Mar	Apr	May	Jun	Jul	Aug	Sep	Oct	Nov	Dec	Year
Average precipitation inches (mm)	0.47 (12)	0.74 (19)	1.14 (29)	2.29 (58)	3.57 (91)	3.54 (90)	3.94 (100)	2.82 (72)	1.89 (48)	2.02 (51)	0.94 (24)	0.76 (19)	24.12 (613)
Average snowfall inches (cm)	4.8 (12)	7.2 (18)	3.2 (8.1)	1.9 (4.8)	0.1 (0.25)	0.0 (0.0)	0.0 (0.0)	0.0 (0.0)	0.0 (0.0)	1.3 (3.3)	2.8 (7.1)	5.0 (13)	26.3 (66.55)
Average extreme snow depth inches (cm)	4 (10)	5 (13)	3 (7.6)	2 (5.1)	0 (0)	0 (0)	0 (0)	0 (0)	0 (0)	1 (2.5)	3 (7.6)	4 (10)	5 (13)
Average precipitation days (≥ 0.01 in)	2.6	3.1	4.7	6.5	9.6	8.8	8.1	7.5	5.4	5.3	3.0	3.1	67.7
Average snowy days (≥ 0.01 in)	1.8	2.6	1.5	1.7	0.1	0	0	0	0	0.4	1.1	2.4	11.6
Source: NOAA (snow depth)

== Demographics ==
Historical population
Census	Pop.	Note	%±
1900	296		—
1910	385		30.1%
1920	470		22.1%
1930	489		4.0%
1940	382		−21.9%
1950	327		−14.4%
1960	289		−11.6%
1970	266		−8.0%
1980	189		−28.9%
1990	136		−28.0%
2000	118		−13.2%
2010	93		−21.2%
2020	75		−19.4%
U.S. Decennial Census

=== 2010 census ===
As of the census of 2010, there were 93 people, 45 households, and 31 families residing in the village. The population density was 344.4 inhabitants per square mile (133.0/km^{2}). There were 83 housing units at an average density of 307.4 per square mile (118.7/km^{2}). The racial makeup of the village was 96.8% White, 1.1% Native American, 1.1% Asian, and 1.1% from two or more races. Hispanic or Latino of any race were 2.2% of the population.

There were 45 households, of which 20.0% had children under the age of 18 living with them, 68.9% were married couples living together, and 31.1% were non-families. 31.1% of all households were made up of individuals, and 8.9% had someone living alone who was 65 years of age or older. The average household size was 2.07 and the average family size was 2.55.

The median age in the village was 54.1 years. 17.2% of residents were under the age of 18; 1.2% were between the ages of 18 and 24; 15% were from 25 to 44; 43% were from 45 to 64; and 23.7% were 65 years of age or older. The gender makeup of the village was 50.5% male and 49.5% female.

=== 2000 census ===
As of the census of 2000, there were 118 people, 57 households, and 34 families residing in the village. The population density was 440.1 inhabitants per square mile (169.9/km^{2}). There were 91 housing units at an average density of 339.4 per square mile (131.0/km^{2}). The racial makeup of the village was 97.46% White, 0.85% Native American, 1.69% from other races. Hispanic or Latino of any race were 1.69% of the population.

There were 57 households, out of which 22.8% had children under the age of 18 living with them, 54.4% were married couples living together, 7.0% had a female householder with no husband present, and 38.6% were non-families. 36.8% of all households were made up of individuals, and 14.0% had someone living alone who was 65 years of age or older. The average household size was 2.07 and the average family size was 2.69.

In the village, the population was spread out, with 22.0% under the age of 18, 2.5% from 18 to 24, 23.7% from 25 to 44, 35.6% from 45 to 64, and 16.1% who were 65 years of age or older. The median age was 47 years. For every 100 females, there were 110.7 males. For every 100 females age 18 and over, there were 104.4 males.

As of 2000 the median income for a household in the village was $32,500, and the median income for a family was $37,500. Males had a median income of $26,875 versus $22,917 for females. The per capita income for the village was $17,863. There were 5.6% of families and 6.7% of the population living below the poverty line, including 5.0% of under eighteens and none of those over 64.

== Notable person ==
- Alvin Lee Marts - USS Marts (DE-174) named for him.
