= Danbury, Nebraska =

Village in REd Willow County Nebraska, United States

- Village
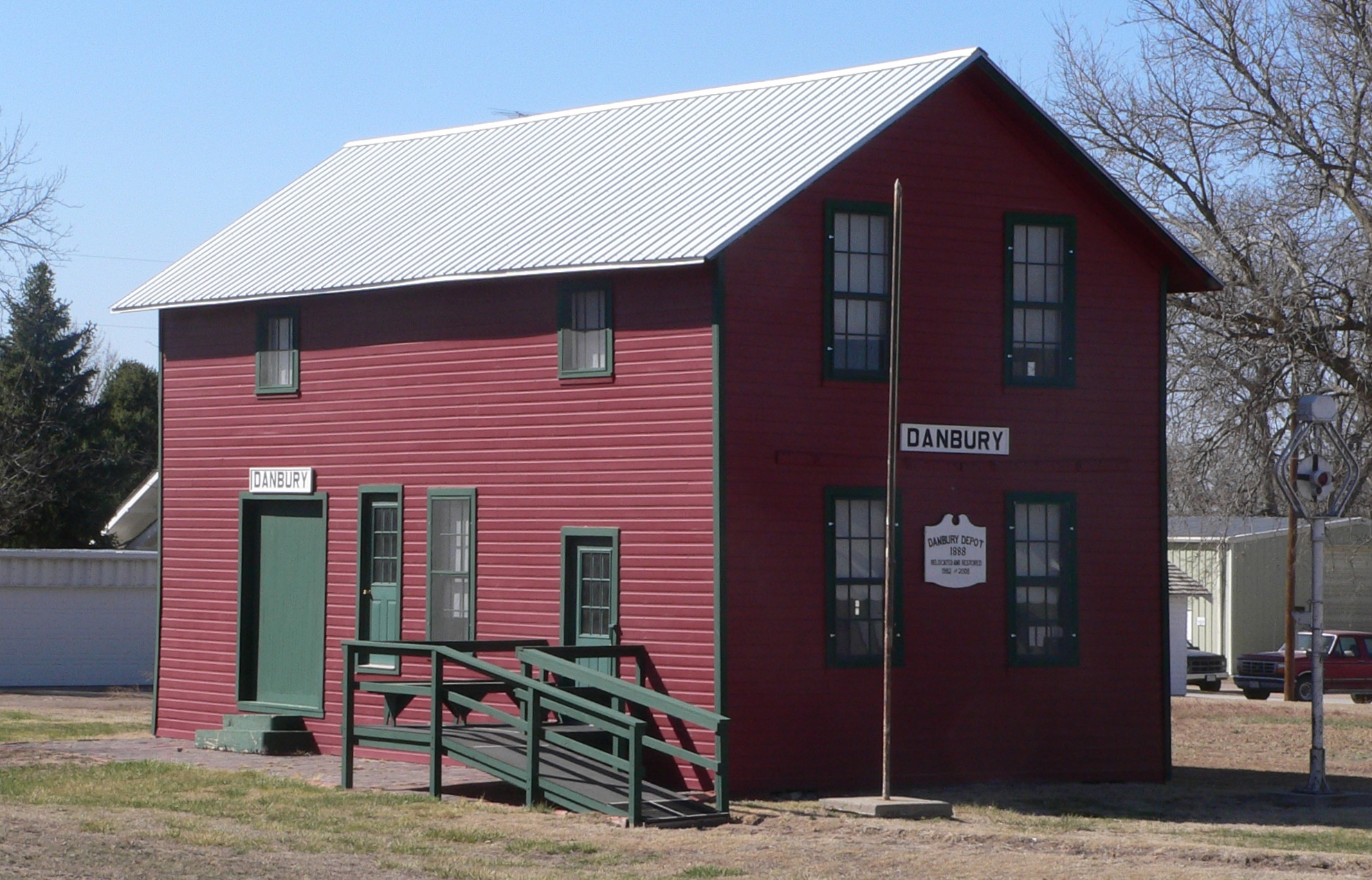
- Danbury railroad depot, now a museum, March 2011

- Location of Danbury, Nebraska
- Coordinates: 40°02′16″N 100°24′18″W
- Country: United States
- State: Nebraska
- County: Red Willow

Area
  - Total: 0.32 sq mi (0.84 km^{2})
  - Land: 0.32 sq mi (0.84 km^{2})
  - Water: 0 sq mi (0.00 km^{2})
- Elevation: 2,490 ft (760 m)

Population (2020)
  - Total: 80
  - Density: 247.0/sq mi (95.36/km^{2})
- Time zone: UTC-6 (Central (CST))
  - Summer (DST): UTC-5 (CDT)
- ZIP code: 69026
- Area code: 308
- FIPS code: 31-12105
- GNIS feature ID: 2398677

Danbury is a village in Red Willow County, Nebraska, United States. As of the 2020 census, Danbury had a population of 80.

== History ==
A post office at Danbury was established in 1888. It was named after Danbury, Connecticut, the former hometown of the first postmaster. Danbury was incorporated as a village in 1898.

== Geography ==
According to the United States Census Bureau, the village has a total area of 0.32 square miles (0.83 km^{2}), all land.

== Demographics ==
Historical population
Census	Pop.	Note	%±
1900	219		—
1910	268		22.4%
1920	293		9.3%
1930	321		9.6%
1940	236		−26.5%
1950	218		−7.6%
1960	185		−15.1%
1970	137		−25.9%
1980	143		4.4%
1990	109		−23.8%
2000	127		16.5%
2010	101		−20.5%
2020	80		−20.8%
U.S. Decennial Census

=== 2010 census ===
As of the census of 2010, there were 101 people, 50 households, and 31 families residing in the village. The population density was 315.6 inhabitants per square mile (121.9/km^{2}). There were 61 housing units at an average density of 190.6 per square mile (73.6/km^{2}). The racial makeup of the village was 99.0% White and 1.0% from two or more races. Hispanic or Latino of any race were 1.0% of the population.

There were 50 households, of which 22.0% had children under the age of 18 living with them, 56.0% were married couples living together, 6.0% had a female householder with no husband present, and 38.0% were non-families. 38.0% of all households were made up of individuals, and 12% had someone living alone who was 65 years of age or older. The average household size was 2.02 and the average family size was 2.65.

The median age in the village was 48.3 years. 21.8% of residents were under the age of 18; 3% were between the ages of 18 and 24; 20.8% were from 25 to 44; 30.6% were from 45 to 64; and 23.8% were 65 years of age or older. The gender makeup of the village was 49.5% male and 50.5% female.

=== 2000 census ===
As of the census of 2000, there were 127 people, 54 households, and 38 families residing in the village. The population density was 378.7 inhabitants per square mile (146.2/km^{2}). There were 60 housing units at an average density of 178.9 per square mile (69.1/km^{2}). The racial makeup of the village was 100.00% White. Hispanic or Latino of any race were 0.79% of the population.

There were 54 households, out of which 24.1% had children under the age of 18 living with them, 68.5% were married couples living together, 1.9% had a female householder with no husband present, and 29.6% were non-families. 25.9% of all households were made up of individuals, and 13.0% had someone living alone who was 65 years of age or older. The average household size was 2.35 and the average family size was 2.87.

In the village, the population spread was 25.2% of the population under the age of 18, 3.9% from 18 to 24, 26.0% from 25 to 44, 25.2% from 45 to 64, and 19.7% who were 65 years of age or older. The median age was 42 years. For every 100 females, there were 98.4 males. For every 100 females age 18 and over, there were 111.1 males.

As of 2000 the median income for a household in the village was $33,750, and the median income for a family was $44,583. Males had a median income of $24,464 versus $18,958 for females. The per capita income for the village was $19,512. There were 4.9% of families and 8.4% of the population living below the poverty line, including no under eighteens and 19.0% of those over 64.

== See also ==
- List of municipalities in Nebraska
