= Oxford, Nebraska =

- Village
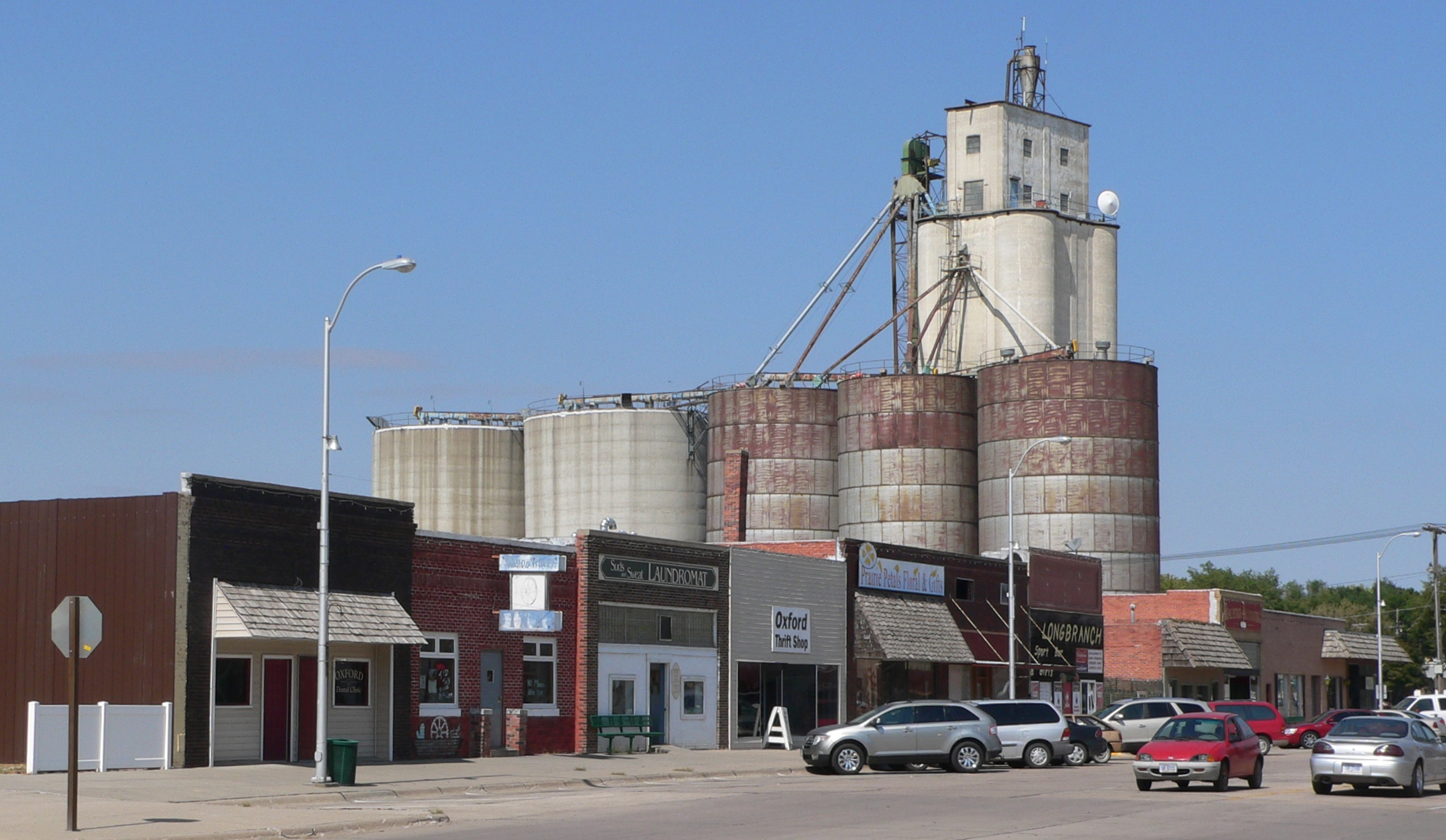
- Downtown Oxford: Ogden Street

- Location of Oxford, Nebraska
- Coordinates: 40°15′11″N 99°37′56″W
- Country: United States
- State: Nebraska
- Counties: Furnas, Harlan

Area
  - Total: 0.91 sq mi (2.36 km^{2})
  - Land: 0.91 sq mi (2.36 km^{2})
  - Water: 0 sq mi (0.00 km^{2})
- Elevation: 2,113 ft (644 m)

Population (2020)
  - Total: 718
  - Density: 789.0/sq mi (304.65/km^{2})
- Time zone: UTC-6 (Central (CST))
  - Summer (DST): UTC-5 (CDT)
- ZIP code: 68967
- Area code: 308
- FIPS code: 31-37910
- GNIS feature ID: 2399606
- Website: villageofoxfordne.com

Oxford is a village in Furnas and Harlan counties in the U.S. state of Nebraska. As of the 2020 census, Oxford had a population of 718.

== History ==
Oxford was established as a town in 1880, when the railroad was extended to that point.

== Geography ==
According to the United States Census Bureau, the village has a total area of 0.95 square miles (2.46 km^{2}), all land.

== Demographics ==
Historical population
Census	Pop.	Note	%±
1890	428		—
1900	576		34.6%
1910	593		3.0%
1920	739		24.6%
1930	1,155		56.3%
1940	1,141		−1.2%
1950	1,270		11.3%
1960	1,090		−14.2%
1970	1,116		2.4%
1980	1,109		−0.6%
1990	949		−14.4%
2000	876		−7.7%
2010	779		−11.1%
2020	718		−7.8%
U.S. Decennial Census

=== 2010 census ===
As of the census of 2010, there were 779 people, 349 households, and 213 families living in the village. The population density was 820.0 inhabitants per square mile (316.6/km^{2}). There were 439 housing units at an average density of 462.1 per square mile (178.4/km^{2}). The racial makeup of the village was 96.0% White, 0.1% African American, 1.2% Native American, 0.4% Asian, 1.5% from other races, and 0.8% from two or more races. Hispanic or Latino of any race were 3.2% of the population.

There were 349 households, of which 27.5% had children under the age of 18 living with them, 48.7% were married couples living together, 8.0% had a female householder with no husband present, 4.3% had a male householder with no wife present, and 39.0% were non-families. 36.1% of all households were made up of individuals, and 16.9% had someone living alone who was 65 years of age or older. The average household size was 2.23 and the average family size was 2.90.

The median age in the village was 46.2 years. 25.3% of residents were under the age of 18; 5% were between the ages of 18 and 24; 18.4% were from 25 to 44; 31.7% were from 45 to 64; and 19.8% were 65 years of age or older. The gender makeup of the village was 49.4% male and 50.6% female.

=== 2000 census ===
As of the census of 2000, there were 876 people, 379 households, and 241 families living in the village. The population density was 965.1 inhabitants per square mile (372.6/km^{2}). There were 462 housing units at an average density of 509.0 per square mile (196.5/km^{2}). The racial makeup of the village was 98.17% White, 0.11% African American, 0.57% Native American, and 1.14% from two or more races. Hispanic or Latino of any race were 0.34% of the population.

There were 379 households, out of which 27.2% had children under the age of 18 living with them, 52.2% were married couples living together, 9.5% had a female householder with no husband present, and 36.4% were non-families. 33.5% of all households were made up of individuals, and 16.1% had someone living alone who was 65 years of age or older. The average household size was 2.22 and the average family size was 2.81.

In the village, the population was spread out, with 22.7% under the age of 18, 5.0% from 18 to 24, 25.2% from 25 to 44, 24.8% from 45 to 64, and 22.3% who were 65 years of age or older. The median age was 44 years. For every 100 females, there were 96.4 males. For every 100 females age 18 and over, there were 90.7 males.

As of 2000 the median income for a household in the village was $33,490, and the median income for a family was $40,875. Males had a median income of $29,063 versus $20,625 for females. The per capita income for the village was $18,129. Below the poverty line were 7.3% of people, 2.7% of families, 8.4% of those under 18 and 12.0% of those over 64.

== Notable people ==
- Dorothy Grebenak, American Pop artist
- Ron Hansen, baseball player
- Fred Gustus Johnson, 17th Lieutenant Governor of Nebraska
- Jeff Kinney, football player for the Nebraska Cornhuskers national championship teams in 1970–1971; also played in the NFL
