= Beaver City, Nebraska =

- City
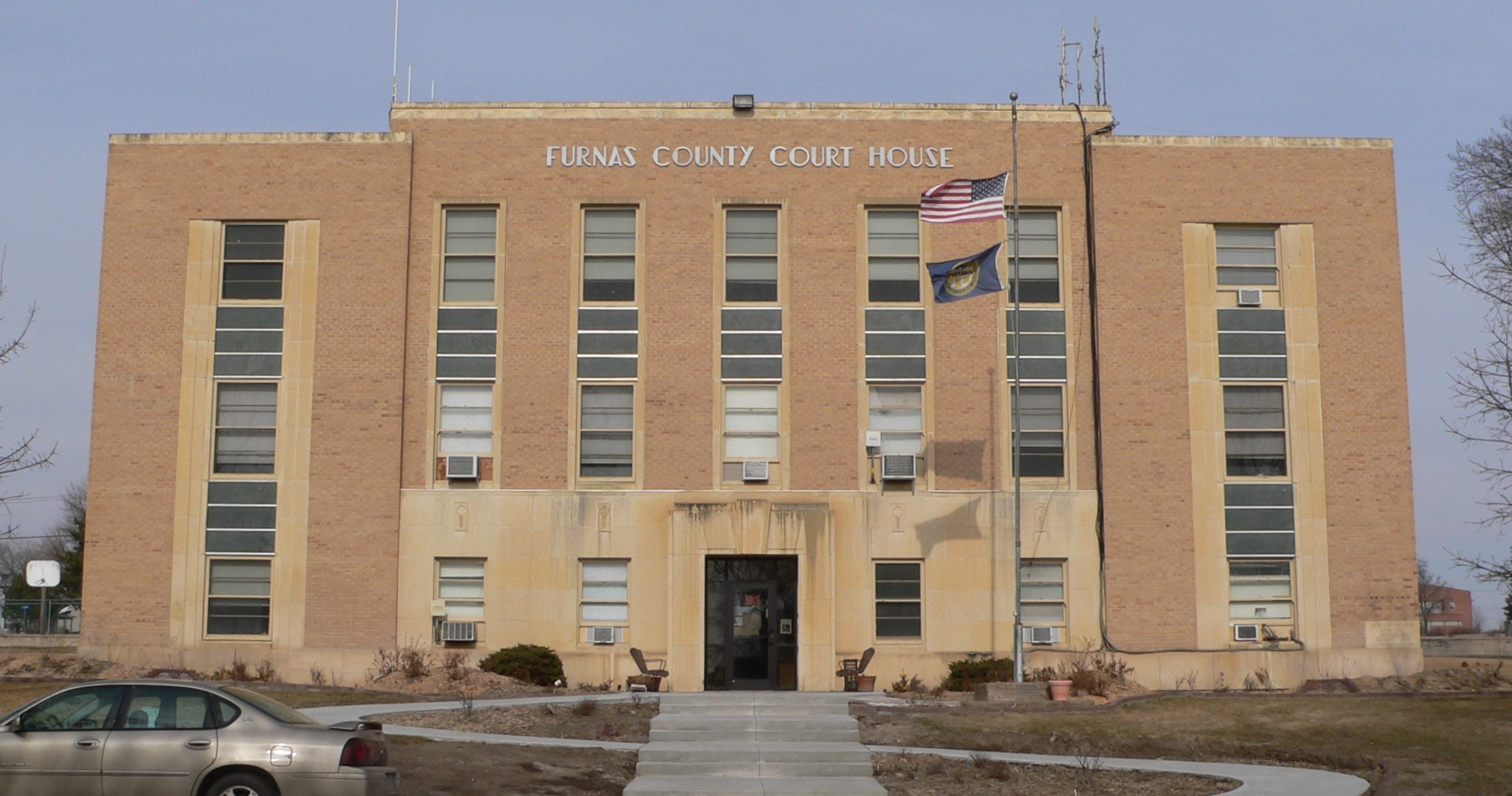
- Furnas County courthouse

- Location of Beaver City, Nebraska
- Coordinates: 40°08′18″N 99°49′39″W
- Country: United States
- State: Nebraska
- County: Furnas

Area
  - Total: 0.99 sq mi (2.56 km^{2})
  - Land: 0.99 sq mi (2.56 km^{2})
  - Water: 0 sq mi (0.00 km^{2})
- Elevation: 2,185 ft (666 m)

Population (2020)
  - Total: 537
  - Density: 542.8/sq mi (209.58/km^{2})
- Time zone: UTC-6 (Central (CST))
  - Summer (DST): UTC-5 (CDT)
- ZIP code: 68926
- Area code: 308
- FIPS code: 31-03495
- GNIS feature ID: 2394100

Beaver City is a city in Furnas County, on the southern border of Nebraska, United States. As of the 2020 census, Beaver City had a population of 537. It is the county seat of Furnas County.

== History ==
Beaver City was platted in 1872. It was named after Beaver Creek, which was named for the abundance of North American beaver.

United States Senator George W. Norris (R-Nebraska) began his law career in Beaver City, moving here after law school at Valparaiso University in Indiana. He later moved to McCook, a larger city.

== Geography ==
According to the United States Census Bureau, the city has a total area of 0.99 square miles (2.56 km^{2}), all land.

=== Climate ===
Climate data for Beaver City, Nebraska (1991–2020 normals, extremes 1893–present)
Month	Jan	Feb	Mar	Apr	May	Jun	Jul	Aug	Sep	Oct	Nov	Dec	Year
Record high °F (°C)	80 (27)	85 (29)	97 (36)	101 (38)	109 (43)	116 (47)	117 (47)	113 (45)	109 (43)	101 (38)	89 (32)	84 (29)	117 (47)
Mean daily maximum °F (°C)	41.8 (5.4)	45.7 (7.6)	57.6 (14.2)	66.3 (19.1)	75.8 (24.3)	87.0 (30.6)	92.3 (33.5)	90.2 (32.3)	83.1 (28.4)	70.1 (21.2)	55.3 (12.9)	43.2 (6.2)	67.4 (19.7)
Daily mean °F (°C)	26.9 (−2.8)	30.3 (−0.9)	40.9 (4.9)	50.5 (10.3)	61.3 (16.3)	72.4 (22.4)	77.7 (25.4)	75.2 (24.0)	66.7 (19.3)	52.8 (11.6)	39.0 (3.9)	28.3 (−2.1)	51.8 (11.0)
Mean daily minimum °F (°C)	12.1 (−11.1)	14.8 (−9.6)	24.3 (−4.3)	34.6 (1.4)	46.8 (8.2)	57.7 (14.3)	63.0 (17.2)	60.2 (15.7)	50.3 (10.2)	35.4 (1.9)	22.7 (−5.2)	13.3 (−10.4)	36.3 (2.4)
Record low °F (°C)	−26 (−32)	−35 (−37)	−20 (−29)	1 (−17)	21 (−6)	34 (1)	39 (4)	37 (3)	16 (−9)	1 (−17)	−13 (−25)	−34 (−37)	−35 (−37)
Average precipitation inches (mm)	0.51 (13)	0.81 (21)	1.36 (35)	2.42 (61)	3.64 (92)	3.47 (88)	3.54 (90)	3.06 (78)	2.01 (51)	1.97 (50)	0.99 (25)	0.80 (20)	24.58 (624)
Average snowfall inches (cm)	4.2 (11)	6.0 (15)	2.6 (6.6)	1.3 (3.3)	0.0 (0.0)	0.0 (0.0)	0.0 (0.0)	0.0 (0.0)	0.0 (0.0)	0.4 (1.0)	2.2 (5.6)	4.6 (12)	21.3 (54)
Average precipitation days (≥ 0.01 in)	3.1	3.6	5.0	7.2	9.4	8.7	7.9	7.6	5.4	5.1	3.5	3.4	69.9
Average snowy days (≥ 0.1 in)	2.1	2.4	1.3	0.6	0.0	0.0	0.0	0.0	0.0	0.2	1.0	2.3	9.9
Source: NOAA

== Demographics ==
Historical population
Census	Pop.	Note	%±
1880	153		—
1890	763		398.7%
1900	911		19.4%
1910	975		7.0%
1920	1,103		13.1%
1930	1,024		−7.2%
1940	1,015		−0.9%
1950	913		−10.0%
1960	818		−10.4%
1970	802		−2.0%
1980	775		−3.4%
1990	707		−8.8%
2000	641		−9.3%
2010	609		−5.0%
2020	537		−11.8%
U.S. Decennial Census

=== 2010 census ===
As of the census of 2010, there were 609 people, 278 households, and 154 families residing in the city. The population density was 615.2 inhabitants per square mile (237.5/km^{2}). There were 357 housing units at an average density of 360.6 per square mile (139.2/km^{2}). The racial makeup of the city was 96.1% White, 0.5% African American, 1.0% Native American, 0.2% Asian, 0.7% from other races, and 1.6% from two or more races. Hispanic or Latino of any race were 2.3% of the population.

There were 278 households, of which 25.5% had children under the age of 18 living with them, 42.4% were married couples living together, 6.8% had a female householder with no husband present, 6.1% had a male householder with no wife present, and 44.6% were non-families. 40.3% of all households were made up of individuals, and 20.5% had someone living alone who was 65 years of age or older. The average household size was 2.12 and the average family size was 2.82.

The median age in the city was 47.1 years. 23% of residents were under the age of 18; 5.5% were between the ages of 18 and 24; 18.8% were from 25 to 44; 26.7% were from 45 to 64; and 25.9% were 65 years of age or older. The gender makeup of the city was 49.3% male and 50.7% female.

=== 2000 census ===
As of the census of 2000, there were 641 people, 281 households, and 168 families residing in the city. The population density was 669.6 inhabitants per square mile (258.5/km^{2}). There were 348 housing units at an average density of 363.5 per square mile (140.3/km^{2}). The racial makeup of the city was 97.97% White, 0.31% African American, 0.31% Native American, 0.31% from other races, and 1.09% from two or more races. Hispanic or Latino of any race were 1.87% of the population.

There were 281 households, out of which 25.6% had children under the age of 18 living with them, 52.7% were married couples living together, 5.3% had a female householder with no husband present, and 39.9% were non-families. 38.8% of all households were made up of individuals, and 25.6% had someone living alone who was 65 years of age or older. The average household size was 2.16 and the average family size was 2.81.

In the city, the population was spread out, with 23.2% under the age of 18, 4.2% from 18 to 24, 20.1% from 25 to 44, 21.8% from 45 to 64, and 30.6% who were 65 years of age or older. The median age was 46 years. For every 100 females, there were 80.6 males. For every 100 females age 18 and over, there were 78.3 males.

As of 2000 the median income for a household in the city was $27,443, and the median income for a family was $38,594. Males had a median income of $25,234 versus $16,944 for females. The per capita income for the city was $17,701. About 9.0% of families and 14.7% of the population were below the poverty line, including 23.8% of those under age 18 and 12.2% of those age 65 or over.
