= Nebraska Highway 133 =

State highway in Nebraska, U.S.

State Highway 133

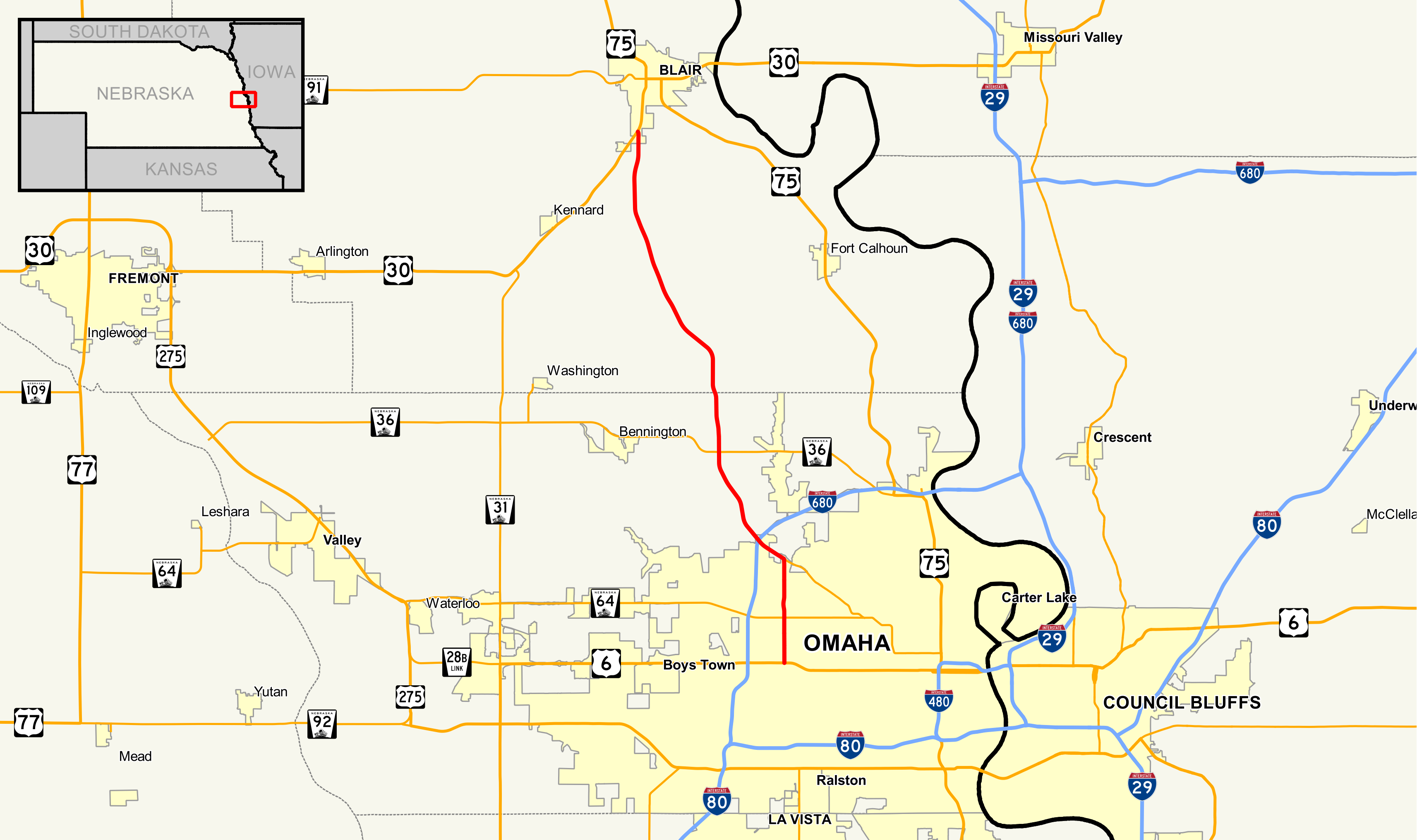
- Nebraska Highway 133 highlighted in red

Route information
- Maintained by NDOT
- Length: 19.18 mi (30.87 km)
- Existed: 1947–present

Major junctions
- South end: US 6 in Omaha
- N-64 in Omaha; I-680 in Omaha; N-36 north of Omaha
- North end: US 30 in Blair

Location
- Country: United States
- State: Nebraska
- Counties: Douglas, Washington

Highway system
- Nebraska State Highway System; Interstate; US; State; Link; Spur; State Spurs; Recreation
← I-129	→ US 136

Nebraska Highway 133 (N-133) is a state highway in Douglas and Washington counties in Nebraska, United States, that conencts U.S. Route 6 (US 6) in Omaha with U.S. Route 30 (US 30) in Blair. For its entire length, N-133 is a four-lane divided highway.

== Route description ==
=== Douglas County ===
N-133 begins at a signal-controlled intersection with US 6 (Grand Army of the Republic/West Dodge Road) and North 90th Street in Omaha in Douglas County. (From the intersection US 6 heads east toward Interstate 480/U.S. Route 75 and Downtown Omaha and then on to Council Bluffs, Oakland, and Atlantic in Iowa. US 6 heads west toward Interstate 680, Boys Town, Gretna, and Lincoln. North 90th Street heads south for several miles in Omaha.) From its southern terminus N-133 heads north along North 90th Street through residential and commercial areas for one and a half miles (2.4 km) before crossing Nebraska Highway 64 (N-64/Maple Street) at a signal-controlled intersection. (N-64 heads east to end at U.S. Route 75 and west toward U.S. Route 275, Waterloo, and Valley.)

North of N-64, N-133 continues north along North 90th Street for just under 2 miles (3.2 km) before reaching a signal-controlled intersection with Nebraska Link 28K (L-28K/Blair High Road) and Sorensen Parkway at a signal-controlled intersection near the northern edge of Omaha and just south of Irvington. (L-28K heads southeast to end at N-64. Sorensen Parkway heads north, then east to end at US 75. From 1955 to 1960, what is now L-28K, was designated as Nebraska Highway 38.) From that intersection N-133 heads northwest along Blair High Road for just over one mile (1.6 km) to a junction with Interstate 680 (I-680) at a diamond interchange (I-680 Exit 6) before leaving Omaha. (I-680 heads east toward US 75 and then on to Interstate 29 and Crescent in Iowa. I-680 heads south toward US 6, N-64, and Interstate 80.)

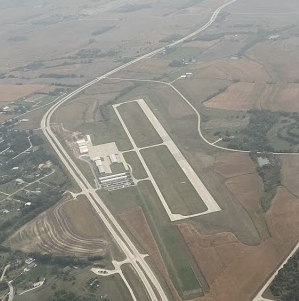
Southeast at the Blair Municipal Airport in Washington County, with N-133 running along the northeast edge, February 2021

After leaving Omaha, N-133 continues north–northeasterly along Blair High Road in rural area in an unincorporated area of Douglas County for about 3.3 miles (5.3 km) to cross Nebraska Highway 36 (N-36/Bennington Road) at a signal-controlled intersection. (N-36 heads east along Bennington Road toward Omaha, US 75, and I-680 and west along Bennington Road toward Bennington and Fremont.) North of N-36, N-133 continues north–northeasterly along Blair High Road for approximately 2 miles (3.2 km) before crossing Dutch Hall Road.

=== Washington County ===
Upon crossing Dutch Hall Road, N-133 leaves Douglas County and enters Washington County. After continuing north for roughly 1.2 miles (1.9 km), N-133 curves to head northwest along the northern edge of the Blair Municipal Airport. Beyond the airport, N-133 continues heading north–northwest for roughly another 4.2 miles (6.8 km) before curving to head northerly again. After approximately 2.3 miles (3.7 km), N-133 enters the city of Blair. Shortly thereafter (0.3 miles [0.48 km]) N-133 reaches its northern terminus at a roundabout with US 30. (From the roundabout US 30 heads north, then east through Blair toward Missouri Valley in Iowa. US 30 heads southwest through Kennard and then west toward Fremont.)

== History ==
N-133 was established by 1947.

== Major intersections ==
County	Location	mi	km	Destinations	Notes
Douglas	Omaha	0.00	0.00	West Dodge Road (US 6)	Southern terminus; road continues as 90th Street
Douglas	Omaha	1.48	2.38	N-64 (Maple Street)	Former N-130
Douglas	Omaha	3.42	5.50	L-28K south (Blair High Road south) / Sorenson Parkway east	L-28K is former N-38
Douglas	Omaha	4.49	7.23	I-680	I-680 exit 6
Douglas	Union Precinct	7.78	12.52	N-36 (Bennington Road) – Fremont, North Omaha	
Washington	Blair	19.18	30.87	US 30 – Fremont, Blair	Roundabout; northern terminus
1.000 mi = 1.609 km; 1.000 km = 0.621 mi

== See also ==
- List of state highways in Nebraska
