= Nebraska Highway 64 =

State highway in Nebraska, U.S.

State Highway 64

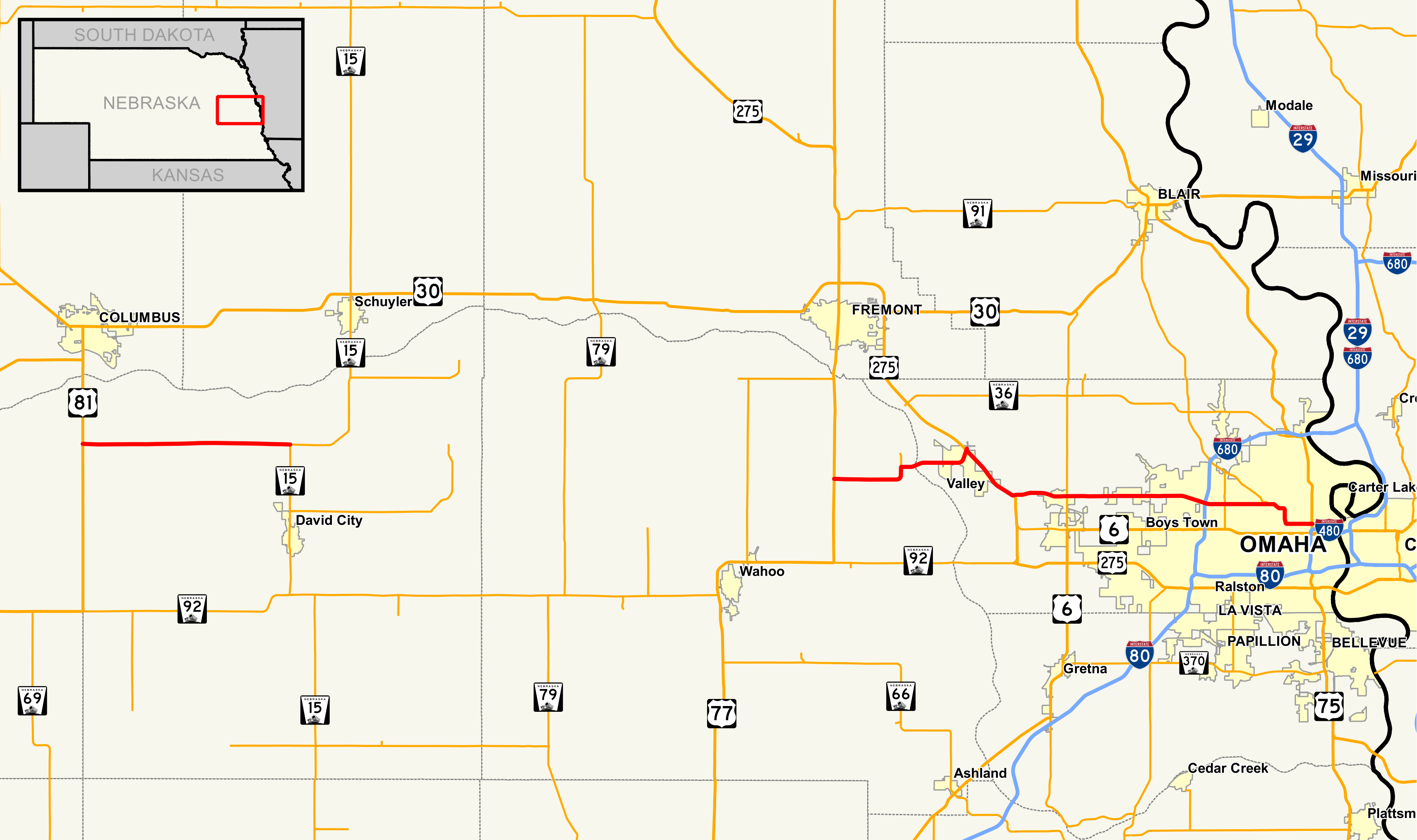
- Nebraska Highway 64 highlighted in red

Route information
- Maintained by NDOT
- Length: 44.57 mi (71.73 km)
- Existed: 1933–present

Western segment
- Length: 12.43 mi (20.00 km)
- West end: US 81 south of Columbus
- East end: N-15 north of David City

Eastern segment
- Length: 32.14 mi (51.72 km)
- West end: US 77 south of Fremont
- Major intersections: US 275 concurrency between Valley and Waterloo; N-31 in Omaha; I-680 in Omaha
- East end: US 75 at Omaha

Location
- Country: United States
- State: Nebraska
- Counties: Western segment: Butler; Eastern segment: Saunders, Douglas

Highway system
- Nebraska State Highway System; Interstate; US; State; Link; Spur; State Spurs; Recreation
← N-63	64	→ N-65
← I-129	N-130	→ N-133

Nebraska Highway 64 is a highway in Nebraska. There are two segments to the highway. The western segment lies in Butler County between U.S. Highway 81 and Nebraska Highway 15. The eastern segment goes through Saunders and Douglas counties between U.S. Highway 77 and U.S. Highway 75.

== Route description ==
=== Western segment ===
The western segment of Nebraska Highway 64 begins at an intersection with U.S. Highway 81 on the Butler/Polk County border south of Columbus. It goes east through farmland to Bellwood, then ends at an intersection with Nebraska Highway 15 north of David City.

=== Eastern segment ===
The eastern segment of Nebraska Highway 64 begins at an intersection with U.S. Highway 77 south of Fremont. It then proceeds east through farmland, then briefly north near Leshara. After meeting Nebraska Spur 78J, it turns east, crosses the Platte River, then turns northeast and meets the U.S. Highway 275 freeway northwest of Valley. The two highways run concurrent until just northwest of Waterloo. They separate, and NE 64 goes east as a divided highway past the Elkhorn River into increasing areas of residential and commercial development and meets Nebraska Highway 31 in the Elkhorn neighborhood of Omaha. The road continues east on a divided highway which is called West Maple Road. Between 108th Street and 102nd Street in Omaha, NE 64 meets Interstate 680. The highway then becomes Maple Street and continues east, becoming a two lane road as it passes through the Benson neighborhood. East of the Benson business district, at an intersection with Nebraska Link 28K, NE 64 becomes divided highway again, and goes east, then south along Northwest Radial Highway, then east along Cuming Street, and terminates at a freeway interchange with U.S. Highway 75 near Creighton University.

== History ==
State Highway 130
- Location: Douglas County
- Length: 32.14 mi (51.72 km)
- Existed: 1941–1957

The eastern segment of N-64 was previously known as State Highway 130.

Prior to the construction of the US 275 freeway in the Valley area, Nebraska Highway 64 used to go through Valley on what is now Reichmuth Road, though it is often locally known as Old Highway 275. This road parallels the Union Pacific railroad tracks.

The east end of Nebraska Highway 64 has also been altered with the reconstruction of the Interstate 480/U.S. Highway 75 interchange. The east end was at the one way pair of Cuming and Burt Streets, with Cuming going west and Burt going east, but with reconstruction, Cuming Street was modified into a two way road at its interchange with US 75.

== Major intersections ==
=== Western segment ===
The entire route is in Butler County.

Location	mi	km	Destinations	Notes
Alexis Township	0.00	0.00	US 81 – Columbus, Osceola	Western terminus of western segment; road continues into Polk County as 141 Road
Bone Creek Township	12.43	20.00	N-15 – Schuyler, David City	Eastern terminus of western segment
1.000 mi = 1.609 km; 1.000 km = 0.621 mi

=== Eastern segment ===
All exits are unnumbered.

County	Location	mi	km	Destinations	Notes
Saunders	Marietta–Pohocco township line	47.19	75.94	US 77 (County Road 11)	Western terminus of eastern segment
Saunders	Leshara Township	51.84	83.43	S-78J north (County Road 7)	
Platte River		52.89	85.12	Bridge	
Douglas	Valley	56.30	90.61	US 275 west (West Dodge Expressway west)	Interchange; west end of freeway; west end of US 275 overlap
Douglas	Valley	58.27	93.78	Meigs Street / 252nd Street	
Douglas	Waterloo Precinct	59.92	96.43	US 275 east (West Dodge Expressway east)	Interchange; east end of freeway; east end of US 275 overlap; eastbound left exit and westbound left entrance
Douglas	Omaha	63.61	102.37	N-31 (204th Street) – Blair	
Douglas	Omaha	71.94	115.78	I-680	I-680 exit 4
Douglas	Omaha	73.17	117.76	N-133 (90th Street)	
Douglas	Omaha	75.86	122.08	L-28K north (Northwest Radial Highway)	Former N-38
Douglas	Omaha	78.33	126.06	33rd Street	Interchange; exits only
Douglas	Omaha	79.33	127.67	US 75 south (North Freeway) / I-480 (Gerald R. Ford Expressway)	Interchange; eastern terminus of eastern segment; no access to or from US 75 north of N-64; entrance to I-480 includes direct ramp to 24th Street; road continues as Cuming Street
1.000 mi = 1.609 km; 1.000 km = 0.621 mi: Concurrency terminus; Incomplete access
