= Nebraska Highway 38 =

Former state highway in Nebraska, United States

State Highway 38
- N-38 highlighted in red 1955–1960 routing in gray

Route information
- Maintained by NDOT
- Length: 11.01 mi (17.72 km)
- Existed: 1939–2003

Major junctions
- West end: US 275 / N-92 in Omaha
- I-680 / I-80 in Omaha
- East end: I-480 / US 75 in Omaha

Location
- Country: United States
- State: Nebraska
- Counties: Douglas

Highway system
- Nebraska State Highway System; Interstate; US; State; Link; Spur; State Spurs; Recreation
← N-36	→ N-39

Nebraska Highway 38 (N-38) was a state highway that ran through Omaha from 1939 through 2003. It started at an intersection with U.S. Highway 275 (US 275) and N-92 in western Omaha and traveled east along West Center Road and Center Street. At Hanscom Park, the highway was routed around the southwestern corner of the park to Ed Creighton Avenue. N-38 ended at an interchange with Interstate 480 (I-480) and US 75.

== Route description ==
N-38 began at an intersection between West Center Road and Industrial Road on the west side of Omaha. Both roads carried US 275 and N-92 on either side of N-38. N-38 began on a continuation of West Center Road and traveled east. Here, the southern side of N-38 was a light commercial area served by frontage roads while the northern side was abutted by housing. As it approached I-680, big box retailers lined both sides of the road. The I-680 interchange is located less than one mile (1.6 km) north of its terminal interchange with I-80. East of the interchange the road passed through a residential area. It crossed Big Papillion Creek and then passed a commercial area. At 72nd Street, a partial cloverleaf interchange connected the two streets. Shortly thereafter, it passed to the south of the College of Saint Mary and the University of Nebraska Omaha Pacific campus, now known as the Scott campus. N-38 angled to the northeast for a block and then straightened out to the east again; it passed the Omaha VA Medical Center. At 32nd Street, N-38 turned south in order to go around Hanscom Park. It turned east onto Ed Creighton Avenue and then ended at an interchange with I-480 / US 75. The roadway continued east past the interchange as Martha Street.

== History ==
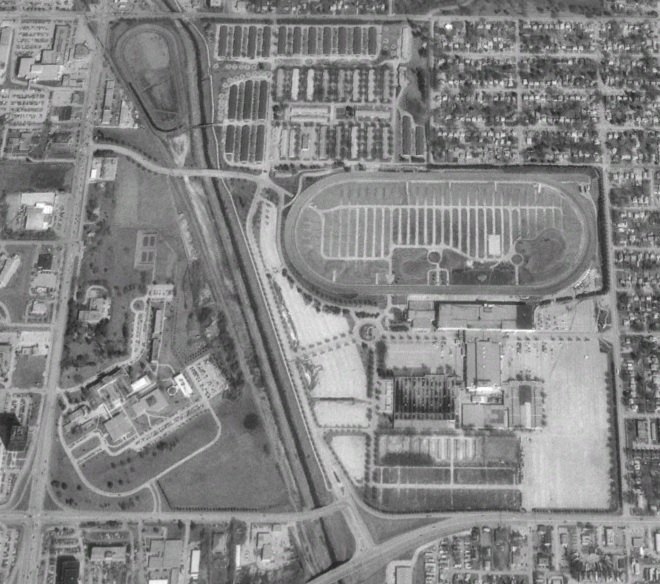
Ak-Sar-Ben Field in 1993; Center Street is the curved street at the bottom of the image

N-38 was created in 1939 when US 6 was rerouted onto Dodge Street. The highway began at an intersection with US 30 Alternate near the Elkhorn River. After crossing the river, it headed due east toward Omaha. It intersected US 6 and N-31 south of Elkhorn. It entered Omaha on West Center Road. It intersected N-50 at 132nd Street and US 275 / N-92 at 72nd Street. Near Ak-Sar-Ben Field, the highway curved to the north on Saddle Creek Road. It ended at Dodge Street, which carried US 6, US 30 Alternate, US 275, and N-92. In 1955, large portions of N-8 were turned over to Douglas County as the state adopted a comprehensive plan for its state highway system. N-38 was extended at this time over parts of N-8 from its eastern end to an intersection with N-133 near Irvington. N-38's route looked like a reversed J on state maps.

In late 1960, the western end of N-38 was moved back to its final location. US 275 and N-92 were rerouted out of central Omaha and west onto L Street and Industrial Road which became West Center Road at N-38. In the mid-1970s, officials from the City of Omaha proposed rerouting N-38 out of the central part of the city and east along Center Street and Ed Creighton Avenue to end at I-480. The move occurred after the Nebraska Department of Roads (NDOR) conducted a study. The highway remained on this routing for the rest of its existence. Talks between the city and NDOR regarding a transfer of ownership of N-38 began in earnest in the early 2000s when there were plans to widen Center Street. Upon completion of several projects along N-38, the city would take ownership of the highway. NDOR had been paying the city about $80,000 per year (equivalent to $130,000 in 2023) for maintenance. The transfer of jurisdiction took effect on January 1, 2003.

== Major intersections ==
The entire route was in Omaha, Douglas County.

mi	km	Destinations	Notes
0.00	0.00	US 275 / N-92	Western terminus; West Center Road continued west as US 275/N-92 west
3.55	5.71	I-680 north / I-80	I-680 exit 1, I-80 exit 445
6.81	10.96	72nd Street	Interchange
11.01	17.72	I-480 / US 75 (Gerald R. Ford Expressway)	Eastern terminus; I-480 exit 1A; road continued as Martha Street
1.000 mi = 1.609 km; 1.000 km = 0.621 mi
