= Nebraska Highway 36 =

State highway in Nebraska, U.S.

State Highway 36

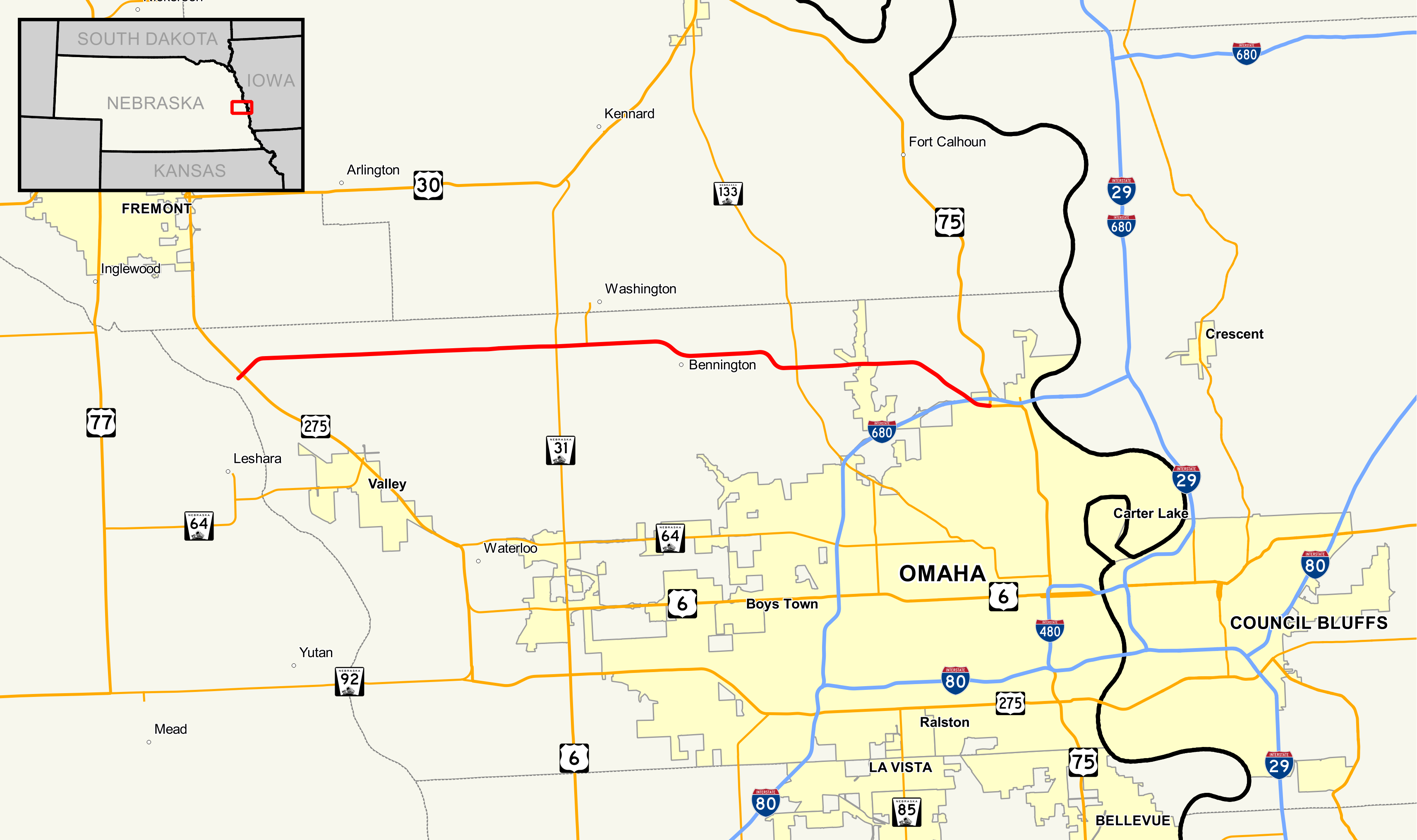
- Nebraska Highway 36 highlighted in red

Route information
- Maintained by NDOT
- Length: 23.70 mi (38.14 km)
- Existed: 1926–present

Major junctions
- West end: Reichmuth Road southeast of Fremont
- US 275 near Fremont; N-31 west of Bennington; N-133 east of Bennington
- East end: US 75 in Omaha

Location
- Country: United States
- State: Nebraska
- Counties: Douglas

Highway system
- Nebraska State Highway System; Interstate; US; State; Link; Spur; State Spurs; Recreation
← N-35	→ N-39

Nebraska Highway 36 is a highway in Nebraska. Its western terminus is 0.17 miles (270 m) southwest of U.S. Highway 275 near Fremont, and its eastern terminus is at U.S. Highway 75 in Omaha.

== Route description ==
Nebraska Highway 36 begins in far northwestern Douglas County west of a freeway intersection with U.S. Highway 275 between Valley and Fremont. After a brief northeasterly routing, it turns east into farmland, passes the Elkhorn River and meets Nebraska Highway 31. It continues east from there and turns southeast towards Bennington. After passing through the northern edge of Bennington, it goes east, turns southeast briefly, and meets Nebraska Highway 133. It continues east, passes through the northern edge of Glenn Cunningham Lake and turns southeasterly. It becomes a four-lane divided highway as it enters increasing residential areas, passes under Interstate 680 and meets its end at U.S. Highway 75 just south of that highway's intersection with I-680 in the Florence neighborhood of Omaha. Within the city limits of Omaha, it is McKinley Avenue.

== History ==
Prior to 1977, Nebraska Highway 36 extended east over the Mormon Bridge to connect with unsigned Iowa Highway 988. That year, Interstate 680 was designated to use the bridge.

== Major intersections ==
The entire route is in Douglas County.

Location	mi	km	Destinations	Notes
	0.00	0.00	Reichmuth Road – Valley, Fremont	Western terminus; former US 275
	0.17– 0.19	0.27– 0.31	US 275 (West Dodge Expressway) – Fremont, Valley	Interchange
	9.90	15.93	N-31 (204th Street) – Blair, Elkhorn, Arlington	
	10.84	17.45	S-28J north (192nd Street) – Washington	
	17.43	28.05	N-133 (Blair High Road) – Blair, Irvington	
Omaha	23.70	38.14	US 75 to I-680 – Mormon Bridge, Blair	Eastern terminus; road continues as US 75 south (McKinley Street east)
1.000 mi = 1.609 km; 1.000 km = 0.621 mi
