= Interstate 680 (Nebraska–Iowa) =

Highway in Iowa and Nebraska

Interstate 680
- I-680 highlighted in red

Route information
- Auxiliary route of I-80
- Maintained by NDOT and Iowa DOT
- Length: 16.49 mi (26.54 km) Nebraska: 13.32 mi (21.44 km); Iowa: 3.17 mi (5.10 km)
- Existed: December 13, 1966–present
- NHS: Entire route

Major junctions
- South end: I-80 in Omaha, NE
- US 275 / N-92 in Omaha, NE; US 6 in Omaha, NE; US 75 in Omaha, NE
- East end: I-29 near Crescent, IA

Location
- Country: United States
- States: Nebraska; Iowa
- Counties: NE; Douglas; IA; Pottawattamie

Highway system
- Interstate Highway System; Main; Auxiliary; Suffixed; Business; Future
- Nebraska State Highway System; Interstate; US; State; Link; Spur; State Spurs; Recreation
- Iowa Primary Highway System; Interstate; US; State; Secondary; Scenic
← I-480	NE	→ N-1
← I-480	IA	→ I-880

Interstate 680 (I-680) in Nebraska and Iowa is the northern bypass of the Omaha–Council Bluffs metropolitan area. I-680 spans 16.49 miles (26.54 km) from its southern end in western Omaha, Nebraska, to its eastern end near Crescent, Iowa. The freeway passes through a diverse range of scenes and terrains—the urban setting of Omaha, the Missouri River and its valley, the rugged Loess Hills, and the farmland of Pottawattamie County, Iowa.

From 1973 until 2019, I-680 extended much farther into Iowa. It followed I-29 for 10 miles (16 km) between Crescent and Loveland. It then headed east along what is now known as I-880 until it met I-80 again near Neola. The I-880 section was originally known as I-80N from 1966 until it was absorbed into I-680 in 1973. I-680 in Omaha was originally designated Interstate 280 (I-280). Maps from the early and mid-1960s showed I-280 in Omaha. Since this highway would extend into Iowa and I-280 was already planned for the Quad Cities area, this route was redesignated I-680.

== Route description ==
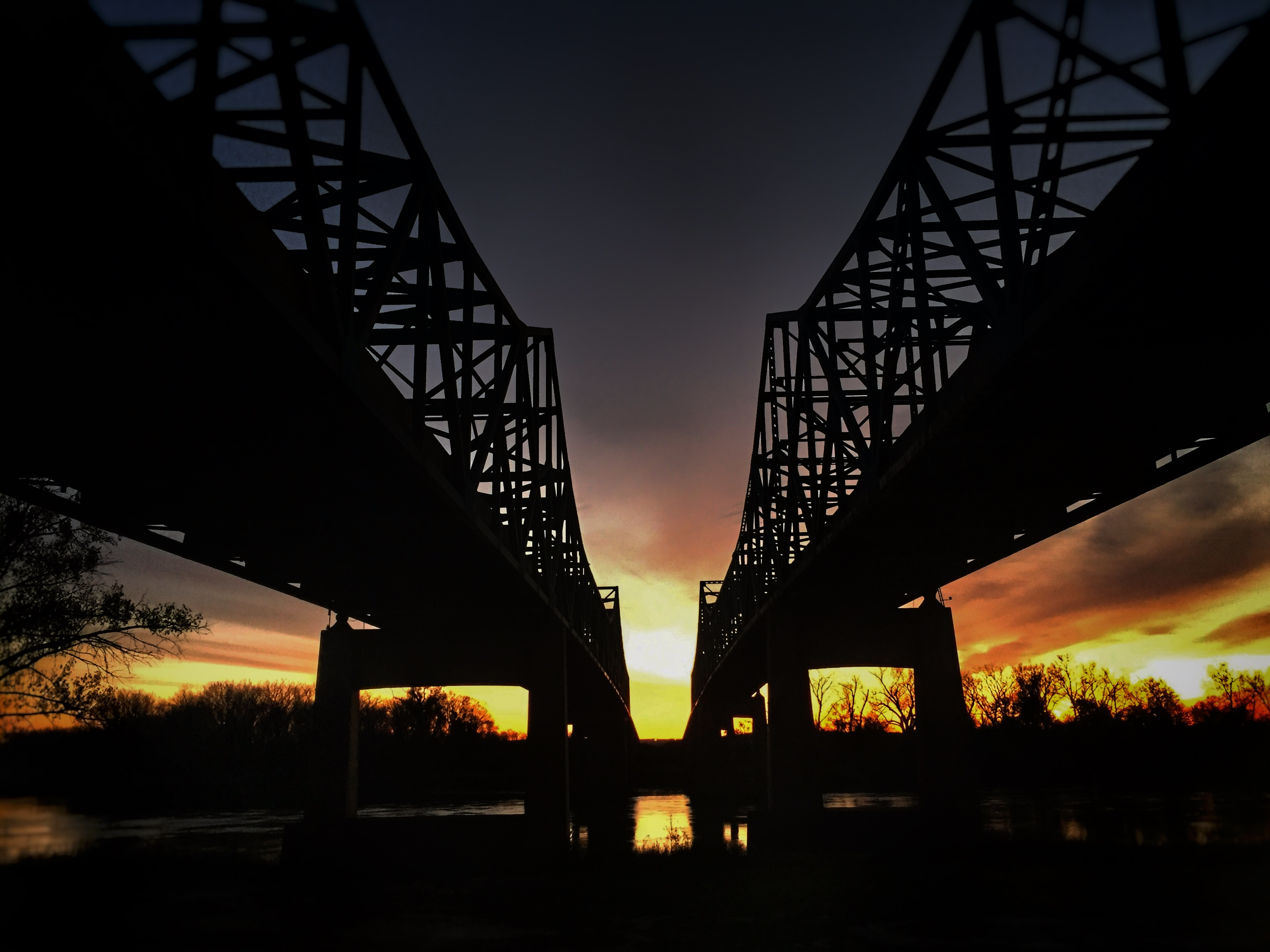
The Mormon Bridge at sunrise

I-680 begins at a complex interchange with I-80 in Omaha. Due to the proximity of the West Center Road interchange on I-680 and the I, L, and Q street interchanges on I-80, all the exit and entrance ramps which connect I-80 to I-680 also connect to West Center Road and I, L, and Q streets. The freeway heads north through the heart of West Omaha; it serves as a dividing line of several residential neighborhoods. Two miles (3.2 km) north of West Center Road, which, prior to 2003, was Nebraska Highway 38 (N-38), is a new interchange with US Route 6 (US 6), known as Dodge Street in Omaha. Another mile (1.6 km) north of Dodge Street is N-64, known as Maple Street.

At N-133, I-680 turns to the east toward Iowa. South of this interchange, I-680 travels through residential neighborhoods, but, to the east, the population thins and the Interstate passes through farmland for 4.5 miles (7.2 km). I-680 crosses over N-36, which is accessed via the US 75 interchange 0.5 miles (0.80 km) later. US 75 runs adjacent to I-680 for one mile (1.6 km) before turning south at 30th Street. The Interstate crosses the Missouri River to Iowa via the Mormon Bridge. In Iowa, I-680 is markedly less urban than in Nebraska. The first three miles (4.8 km) of I-680 travel through the flat bottoms of the Missouri River valley. I-680 ends at an interchange with I-29 just west of Crescent.

== History ==
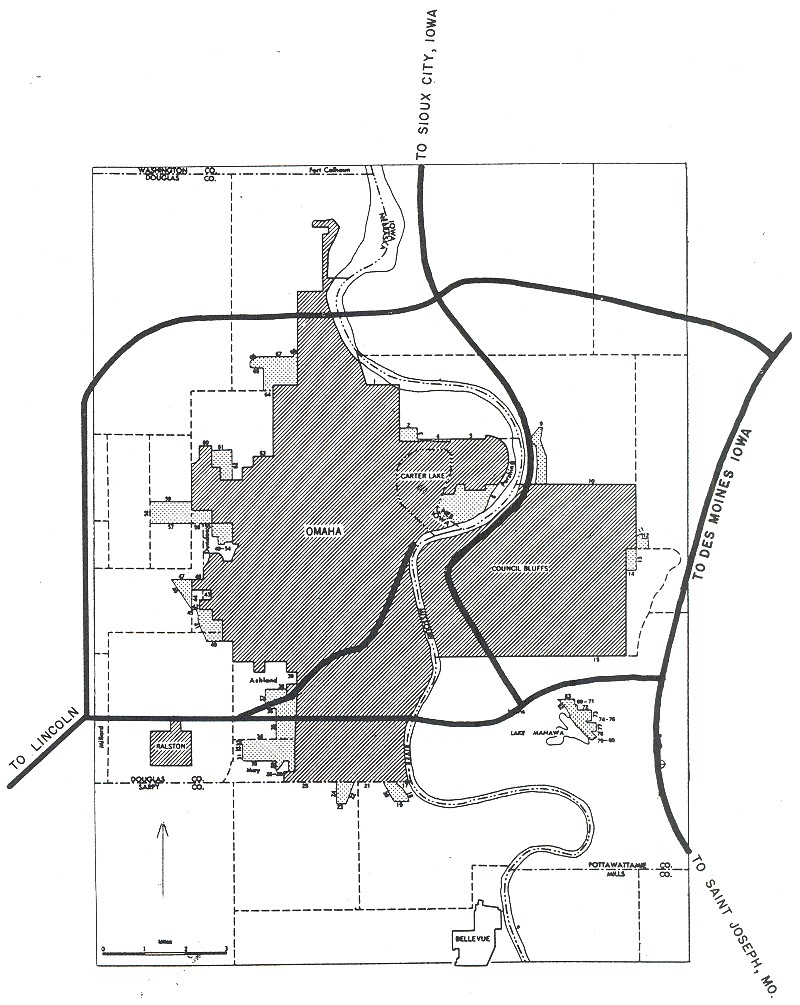
The original plans of what is now I-680 around Omaha

Interstate 280
- Location: Omaha, Nebraska
- Existed: 1958–1965

In Nebraska, plans for I-280 to bypass Omaha to the north to I-29 were drawn up in the late 1950s. At the same time, plans were being drawn up for an I-280 to bypass the Quad Cities. Since two Interstates cannot have the same designation in the same state, one of the I-280s had to be renumbered. The Omaha I-280 was redesignated as I-680 around 1965. In Iowa, I-80N opened to traffic on December 13, 1966. I-80N extended from the current northern interchange with I-29 near Loveland to the I-80 interchange near Neola.

In the early 1970s, the American Association of State Highway and Transportation Officials (AASHTO) decided that Interstates with a directional suffix, such as I-80N, would have to be renumbered. By 1974, I-80N had been redesignated to I-680 to match Nebraska. The last piece of I-680 to be completed in Nebraska was the westbound bridge across the Missouri River. Paving in Iowa wrapped up in the years to come and the entire route was open to traffic by April 21, 1979.

=== 2011 flooding ===
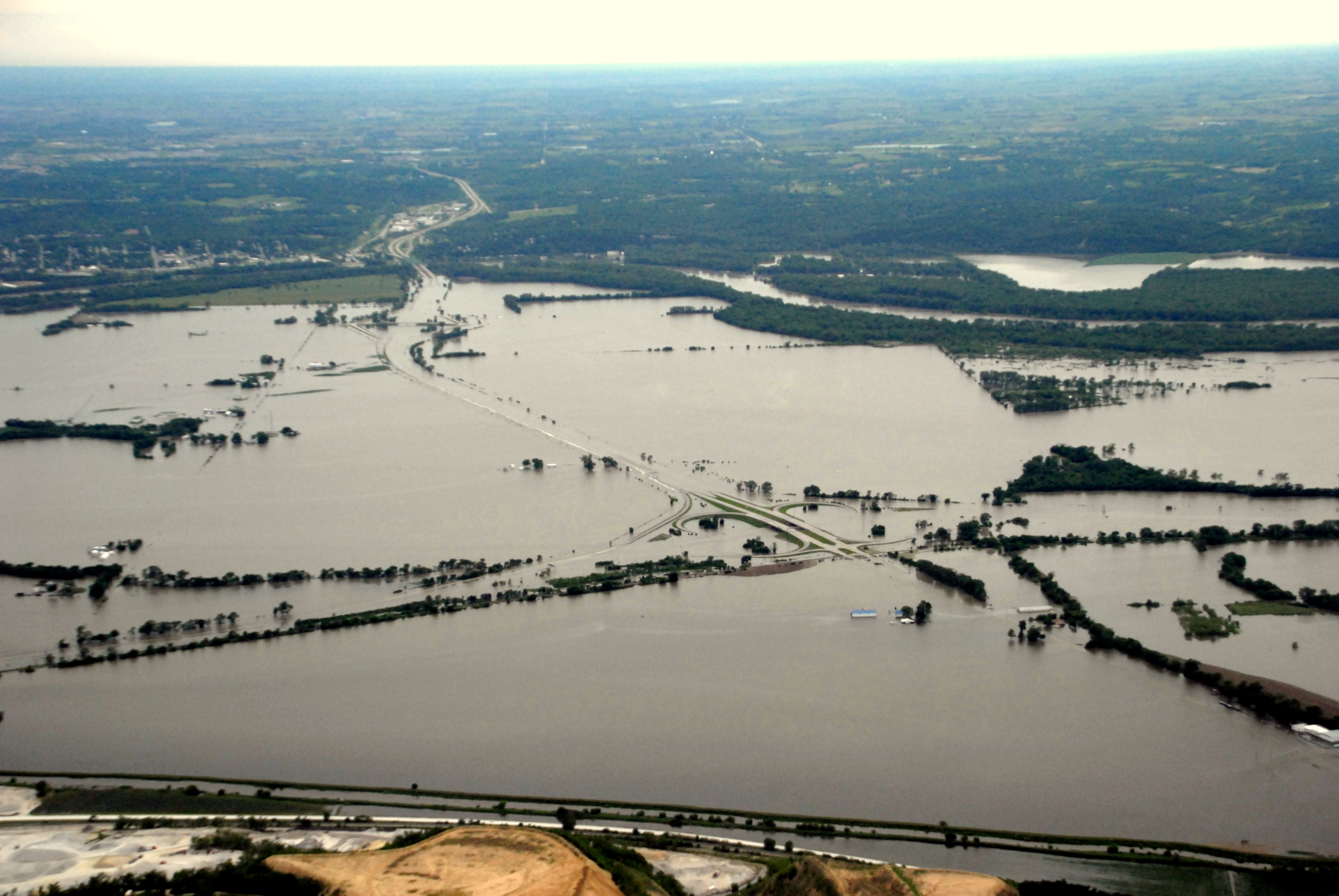
Interchange with I-29 looking toward the Mormon Bridge from Council Bluffs on June 16, 2011, during the 2011 Missouri River Flood

Over the course of several months in 2011, I-680 was severely damaged by flood waters from the Missouri River. The first sections of both I-680 and I-29 closed on June 10. I-29 was closed from North 25th Street to the northern I-680 interchange near Loveland. I-680 was closed from US 75 in Omaha to the southern interchange with I-29. A week later, water was diverted and drained from the area around the northern I-29 interchange to allow traffic to use the roads. I-680 was opened from the interchange to the Beebeetown exit and I-29 was reopened from the interchange to the US 30 exit at Missouri Valley. I-29 traffic was routed around the flooded area by using I-680 eastbound to I-80 westbound to Council Bluffs.

After floodwaters receded and the damage was assessed, sections of I-680 were reopened to traffic. However, the section west of I-29 was the most heavily damaged and it remained closed. Contract bids were let on September 23, and reconstruction began on September 28. Construction crews worked at "an accelerated pace" to complete the road in 34 days. The road was officially reopened on November 2 during a ceremony in Crescent hosted by Governor Terry Branstad.

=== 2019 flooding ===
Iowa DOT closed I-680 for three separate periods during the 2019 floods:

2019 Closure Durations
Closing	Opening	Duration (days)
2019-03-14	2019-04-02	19
2019-05-31	2019-06-12	12
2019-09-20	2019-09-27	7
Total		38

=== 2019 renumbering ===
Due to I-29 and I-680 being subjected to flooding from the adjacent Missouri River, Iowa DOT officials sought to reduce confusion among drivers who were forced to use I-680 and I-80 as a detour around floodwaters. They proposed to AASHTO to redesignate the section of I-680 from Loveland to Neola, Iowa as I-880. The plan was approved on October 5, 2019. I-880 follows the same routing that I-80N had 50 years earlier. Iowa DOT updated its online maps and announced that the signage would be changed just weeks after the official approval by AASHTO. I-680 was shortened to its current length by removing I-680 from concurrent section of I-29/680 between Crescent and Loveland in May 2020.

=== 2024 flooding ===
Due to excessive rainfall in the Siouxland area upstream of Omaha/Council Bluffs, flooding of the Missouri River caused Iowa DOT to close I-29 and I-680, starting at 1am on Wednesday, June 26, 2024. Iowa DOT re-opened I-29 and I-680 with limited lanes at 6pm on Wednesday, July 3. All lanes and all ramps opened at 7:30am on Friday, July 12.

== Exit list ==
State	County	Location	mi	km	Exit	Destinations	Notes
Nebraska	Douglas	Omaha	0.00	0.00	446	I-80 – Downtown, Lincoln	Counterclockwise terminus; I-80 exit 446; exit number is for I-80 westbound; exit number based on I-80 mileage
Nebraska	Douglas	Omaha	0.72	1.16	1	West Center Road / I Street / US 275 / N-92 (L Street) / Q Street	No southbound entrance; southbound exit uses C/D lanes; I-80 exit 445; West Center Road is former N-38; northbound exit signed as West Center Road only
Nebraska	Douglas	Omaha	1.73	2.78	2	Pacific Street	
Nebraska	Douglas	Omaha	2.91	4.68	3	US 6 (West Dodge Road) – Downtown, Boys Town	There are direct exit and entrance ramps to/from Old Mill, 114th Street, and 120th Street
Nebraska	Douglas	Omaha	4.48	7.21	4	N-64 (Maple Street)	
Nebraska	Douglas	Omaha	5.93	9.54	5	Fort Street	
Nebraska	Douglas	Omaha	7.03	11.31	6	N-133 (Blair High Road) – Blair, Irvington	
Nebraska	Douglas	Omaha	9.75	15.69	9	72nd Street	
Nebraska	Douglas	Omaha	11.99	19.30	12	US 75 (48th Street) to N-36	Former US 73
Nebraska	Douglas	Omaha	12.94	20.82	13	30th Street (L-28H) – Eppley Airfield	L-28H unsigned
Missouri River			13.32 0.000	21.44 0.000	Mormon Bridge		
Iowa	Pottawattamie	Crescent Township	1.099	1.769	1	County Road	
Iowa	Pottawattamie	Crescent	3.169	5.100	3	I-29 / CR G37 east – Council Bluffs, Crescent, Sioux City	Clockwise terminus; signed as 3A (south) and 3B (east); I-29 exit 61B
1.000 mi = 1.609 km; 1.000 km = 0.621 mi: Incomplete access

== See also ==
- North Omaha, Nebraska
- History of North Omaha, Nebraska
- Timeline of North Omaha, Nebraska history
