= Iowa Highway 191 =

State highway in Iowa, United States

Iowa Highway 191
- Iowa 191 highlighted in red

Route information
- Maintained by Iowa DOT
- Length: 22.790 mi (36.677 km)

Major junctions
- South end: I-880 north of Neola
- Iowa 44 in Portsmouth
- North end: Iowa 37 in Earling

Location
- Country: United States
- State: Iowa
- Counties: Pottawattamie; Harrison; Shelby

Highway system
- Iowa Primary Highway System; Interstate; US; State; Secondary; Scenic
← Iowa 188	→ Iowa 192

Iowa Highway 191 (Iowa 191) is a highway in western Iowa. It runs for 22.65 miles (36.45 km) in a north–south direction. For its entire length, Iowa 191 closely parallels Mosquito Creek and the Bayard Subdivision of the BNSF Railway. Iowa 191 begins at Interstate 880 north of Neola and ends at Iowa Highway 37 in Earling. Previously, it began at U.S. Highway 6 in Council Bluffs until 1981, and the city limits of Council Bluffs until July 1, 2003. This old segment of highway ran through Underwood and Neola, and is now Pottawattamie County Road G8L.

== Route description ==
Iowa Highway 191 begins at exit 28 of Interstate 880 (I-880) north of Neola in Pottawattamie County. This interchange is about 1 mile (1.6 km) west of the eastern end of I-880 at Interstate 80. Iowa 191 travels north for 1/2 mile (0.80 km) and enters Harrison County. Five miles (8.0 km) north of the county line, Iowa 191 enters the small town of Persia. Through Persia, Iowa 191 is called Railway Street, because the highway runs parallel to the BNSF Railway Bayard Subdivision.

North of Persia, Iowa 191 enters Shelby County. Three miles (4.8 km) north of the county line, Iowa 191 intersects Iowa Highway 44 just south of Portsmouth. North of Portsmouth, the highway enters Panama, which was originally known as Crandall's Station in the 1880s. Southwest of Earling, Iowa 191 and Mosquito Creek part ways; up to this point Iowa 191 had paralleled the creek as well as the Bayard Sub. It enters Earling on the southwest side of town and ends at an intersection with Iowa Highway 37 and Shelby County Road M16.

== History ==
Iowa Highway 191 has lengthened and shortened a few times in its history. Upon its designation in the 1930s, Primary Road No. 191 ran from Primary Road No. 64 in Neola to its current northern end in Earling. When Iowa 64 was truncated to its route in eastern Iowa, Iowa 191 took over the route from Neola to Council Bluffs. In 1981, Iowa 191 was pushed back to the city limits of Council Bluffs. In 2002, the portion south of Interstate 680 (now I-880) was identified as a local service highway and was turned over to Pottawattamie County on July 1, 2003.

== Major intersections ==
County	Location	mi	km	Destinations	Notes
Pottawattamie	Minden Township	0.000	0.000	I-880 (Exit 28) / CR G8L south – Neola, Des Moines, North Omaha	Road continues as CR G8L
Harrison	No major junctions				
Shelby	Portsmouth	11.558	18.601	Iowa 44 – Harlan	
Shelby	Earling	22.790	36.677	Iowa 37 – Dunlap	
1.000 mi = 1.609 km; 1.000 km = 0.621 mi
