= Regency (Omaha) =

Neighborhood in Omaha

- Interactive map of Regency
- Coordinates: 41°15′22″N 96°04′37″W
- Country: United States
- State: Nebraska
- Counties: Douglas County
- City: Omaha

Area
  - Total: 0.96 sq mi (2.49 km^{2})
  - Land: 0.96 sq mi (2.48 km^{2})
  - Water: 0.0039 sq mi (0.01 km^{2})

Population (2010)
  - Total: 17,705
  - Density: 18,500/sq mi (7,140/km^{2})
- ZIP code: 68114
- Area codes: 402, 531

Regency is a neighborhood in Omaha, Nebraska. Bound by West Dodge Road, South 96th Street, Pacific Street and Interstate 680, the development was the first major real estate development funded by Mutual of Omaha.

Regency is home to a premier office park and the upscale One Pacific Place shopping area, and borders the Westroads Mall. The neighborhood features green space, walking paths along with the Regency Park and Regency Lake and Tennis Club. The neighborhood is also bounded by Omaha's Cancer Survivor's Park.

The neighborhood is home to many of Omaha's wealthy citizens, including Vinod Gupta, the founder of InfoUSA. Consequently, the neighborhood has been home to a variety of political campaigning in the past.
