= Ford Freeway =

Ford Freeway can refer to:

- Bishop Ford Freeway, part of I-94 in the Chicago area
- Edsel Ford Freeway, part of I-94 in Detroit
- Gerald R. Ford Freeway (Omaha), part of I-480 in Nebraska
- Gerald R. Ford Freeway (Grand Rapids), part of I-196 in Michigan
