= Interstate 29 in Iowa =

Highway in Iowa

Interstate 29
- I-29 highlighted in red

Route information
- Maintained by Iowa DOT
- Length: 151.826 mi (244.340 km)
- Existed: October 1, 1958–present
- History: Under construction 1958–1972
- Tourist routes: Lewis and Clark Trail
- NHS: Entire route

Major junctions
- South end: I-29 near Hamburg
- US 34 / US 275 near Glenwood; US 275 at Council Bluffs; I-80 at Council Bluffs; I-480 / US 6 at Council Bluffs; I-680 near Crescent; I-880 in Loveland; US 30 at Missouri Valley; I-129 / US 20 / US 75 at Sioux City; US 77 at Sioux City
- North end: I-29 at Sioux City

Location
- Country: United States
- State: Iowa
- Counties: Fremont; Mills; Pottawattamie; Harrison; Monona; Woodbury

Highway system
- Interstate Highway System; Main; Auxiliary; Suffixed; Business; Future; Iowa Primary Highway System; Interstate; US; State; Secondary; Scenic
← Iowa 28	→ US 30

In the US state of Iowa, Interstate 29 (I-29) is a north–south Interstate Highway, which closely parallels the Missouri River. I-29 enters Iowa from Missouri near Hamburg and heads to the north-northwest through the Omaha–Council Bluffs and the Sioux City areas. It exits the state by crossing the Big Sioux River into South Dakota. For its entire distance through the state, I-29 runs on the flat land between the Missouri River and the Loess Hills, and is also part of the Lewis and Clark Trail.

I-29 was built in sections over a period of 15 years. When there was a shortage of male workers, female workers stepped in to build a 20-mile (32 km) section near Missouri Valley. Between Council Bluffs and Sioux City, I-29 replaced U.S. Highway 75 (US 75) as the major route in western Iowa. As a result of I-29's creation, US 75 south of Sioux City was relocated into Nebraska.

== Route description ==
I-29 enters Iowa south of Hamburg. The Interstate heads northwest, where it meets Iowa Highway 333 (Iowa 333) at a diamond interchange. From Hamburg, I-29 continues to the northwest for seven miles (11 km) where it meets Iowa 2 three miles (4.8 km) east of Nebraska City, Nebraska. North of the Iowa 2 interchange, the Interstate straightens out to the north; interchanges serving Percival, Thurman, and Bartlett are spaced out every 4.5 miles (7.2 km). At the US 34 interchange near Glenwood, I-29 is joined by US 275.

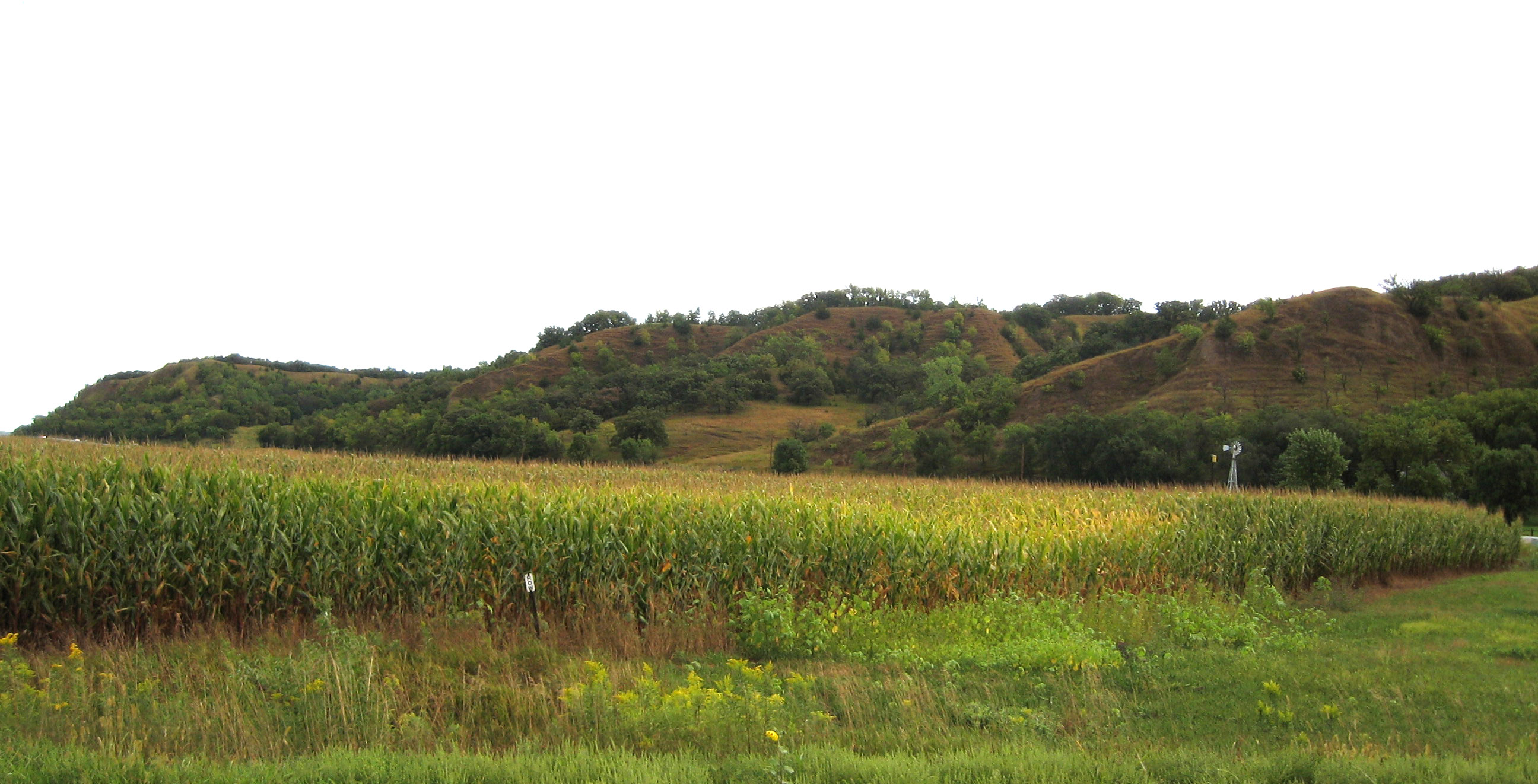
I-29 is flanked by the Loess Hills

North of Glenwood, I-29/US 275 continue north toward Council Bluffs. Near Lake Manawa, US 275 splits away from I-29 at the Iowa 92 interchange. The Interstate meets I-80 0.75 miles (1.21 km) north of the split. The two Interstates head west together through southern Council Bluffs for three miles (4.8 km) on separate carriageways. Just before I-80 crosses the Missouri River into Nebraska, I-29 immediately turns to the north. Two miles (3.2 km) to the north is a modified Y interchange with US 6 and the eastern end of I-480.

North of Council Bluffs, I-29 passes the eastern terminus of I-680 near Crescent. I-29 travels north for nine miles (14 km) before intersecting with the western terminus of I-880 near Loveland. I-29 continues north for four miles (6.4 km) to Missouri Valley, where it intersects US 30. North of Missouri Valley, the Interstate turns to the northwest toward Modale and then straightens out again south of Mondamin, where I-29 meets the western end of Iowa 127. From Mondamin, it travels north for 23 miles (37 km) to the Iowa 175 interchange at Onawa, passing Little Sioux and Blencoe.

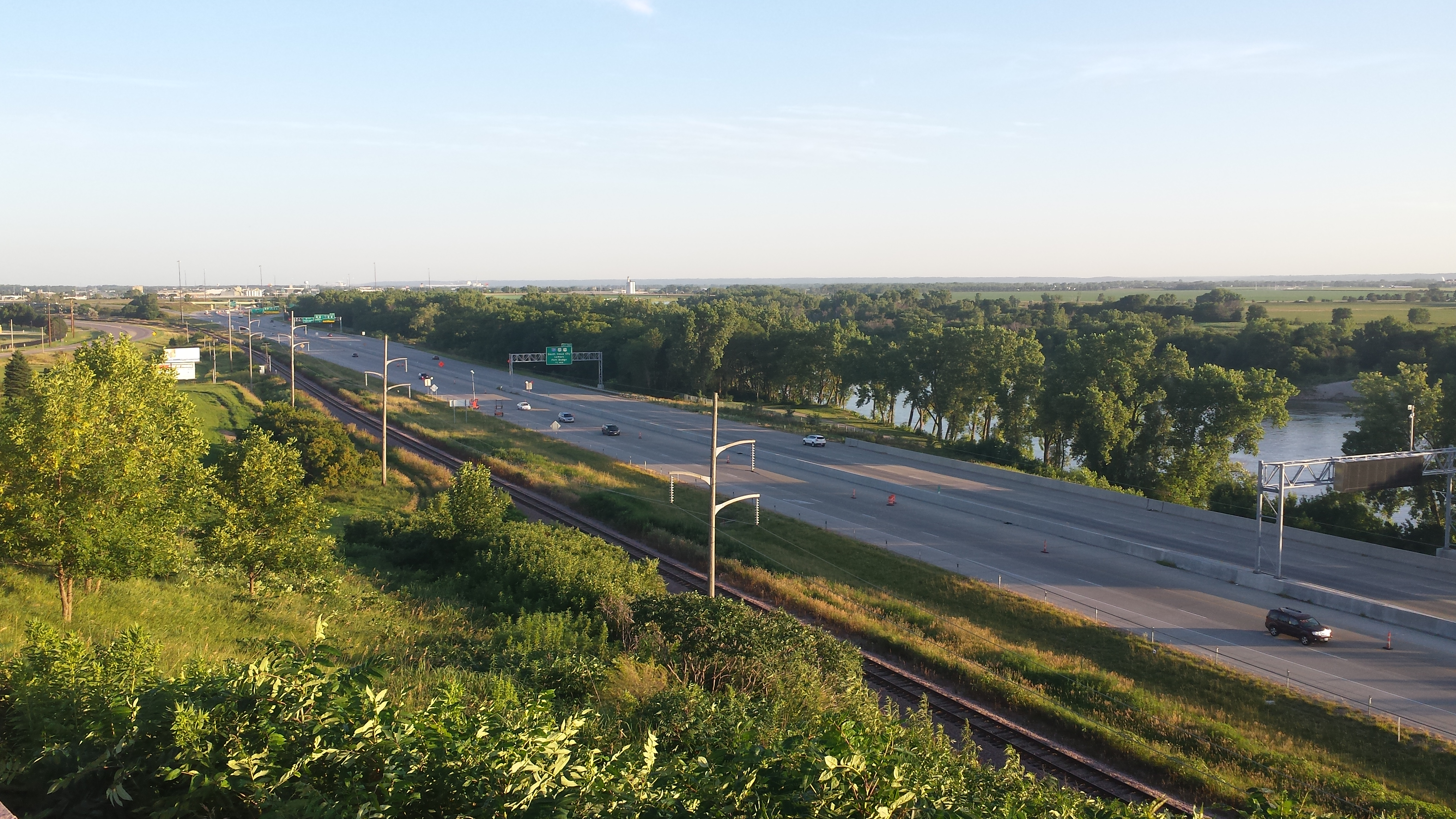
I-29 closely parallels the Missouri River in Sioux City.

North of Onawa, I-29 continues northwest for 15 miles (24 km) toward Sloan, where it meets the western end of Iowa 141. As it approaches the Sioux City metro area, it passes the Sioux Gateway Airport at Sergeant Bluff. At the Singing Hills Boulevard interchange, northbound is joined by southbound U.S. Highway 75 Business (US 75 Bus.). One mile (1.6 km) later, US 75 Bus. ends at the cloverleaf interchange with US 20/US 75, which is also the eastern end of I-129.

For the next three miles (4.8 km) north of the I-129 interchange, I-29 runs closely, as close as 200 feet (61 m), to the Missouri River. The Interstate follows the curve of the river and turns to the west. It meets Gordon Drive, which carries US 20 Bus. US 20 Bus. traffic is directed onto the Interstate for 0.5 miles (0.80 km) to Exit 149, which represents the national northern end of US 77. I-29 continues west along the Missouri River, and, after the Big Sioux River converges into the Missouri, I-29 follows the Big Sioux. Shortly before it crosses the Big Sioux into South Dakota, Iowa 12 splits away to the north.

== History ==
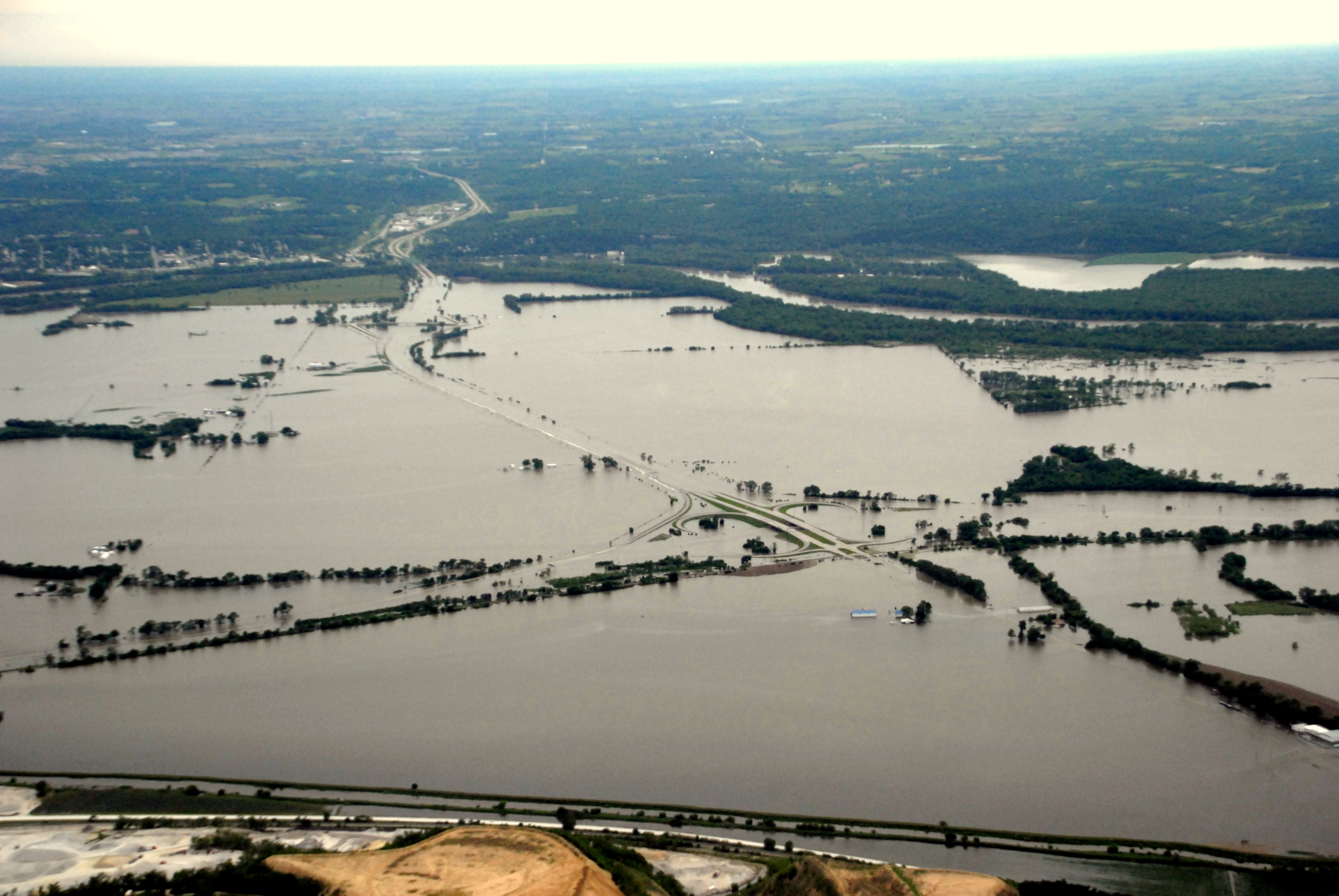
Interchange with I-680 looking toward the Mormon Bridge in Council Bluffs on June 16, 2011, during the 2011 Missouri River floods

Construction of I-29 began in the late 1950s in the Sioux City area. The first section to open, a three-mile-long (4.8 km) stretch from the Big Sioux River to the then–US 20/US 77 bridge across the Missouri River opened around October 1, 1958. In September 1961, I-29 was extended across the Big Sioux River to South Dakota. On April 1, 1962, some of the northbound directional spans collapsed into the Big Sioux River at the South Dakota state line as a result of flooding and bridge scour.

North of Council Bluffs, a 20-mile (32 km) section to Missouri Valley opened in November 1958. By December 1967, the two sections were connected, creating 100 miles (160 km) of continuous interstate highway. Due to a shortage of male workers, at least 20 women were enlisted to help build this section of I-29. The women were paid $2.00 hourly (equivalent to $18.86 hourly in 2024), the same wage as men would have earned.

Construction of I-29 in the Council Bluffs area was completed in 1970, and the route was open to Glenwood in the same year. Additional interchanges were added in the Sioux City and Council Bluffs areas between 1970 and 1971. The last 30 miles (48 km) of Interstate were constructed and opened in sections over the next two years; the last section opened on December 15, 1972.

In 1973, US 34 was expanded to four lanes near Glenwood, which resulted in US 34 being rerouted onto I-29 for three miles (4.8 km). In 2003, US 275 was rerouted onto I-29 from the same interchange near Glenwood northward to Iowa 92 at Council Bluffs. The former US 275 alignment was turned over to Mills and Pottawattamie counties.

Much of I-29 was built next to existing highways, most notably US 75. When the section of I-29 opened between Council Bluffs and Missouri Valley, US 75 was rerouted onto I-29. When construction connecting the Sioux City and Council Bluffs segments was completed, US 75 was again rerouted onto I-29. In the mid-1980s, US 75, from Council Bluffs to Sioux City, was completely rerouted out of Iowa, instead extending up the former US 73 corridor in Nebraska.

In March 2021, the Iowa DOT began a project to improve the I-29/I-480/West Broadway System Interchange at I-480's eastern terminus. The project was done to improve traffic flow, safety, and the functional design at that interchange as well as at the adjacent I-29 interchanges at 41st Street, 35th Street, Avenue G and 9th Avenue. The project is projected to be completed by the end of 2024.

== Exit list ==
County	Location	mi	km	Exit	Destinations	Notes
Fremont	Washington Township	0.000	0.000		I-29 south – St. Joseph, Kansas City	Continuation into Missouri
Fremont	Washington Township	1.811	2.915	1	Iowa 333 east – Hamburg	
Fremont	Benton Township	10.144	16.325	10	Iowa 2 – Sidney, Nebraska City	
Fremont	Benton Township	15.458	24.877	15	CR J26 – Percival	
Fremont	Scott Township	19.917	32.053	20	CR J24 – McPaul, Thurman	Formerly Iowa 145
Fremont	Scott Township	24.447	39.344	24	CR L31 (To CR J10) – Bartlett, Tabor	
Mills	Plattville Township	32.386	52.120	32	CR L35 – Pacific Junction, Plattsmouth	Formerly US 34
Mills	Plattville Township	35.477	57.095	35	US 34 / US 275 south – Glenwood, Red Oak	Southern end of US 275 overlap
Mills	St. Marys Township	43.805	70.497	42	CR H10 – Bellevue	Formerly Iowa 370
Pottawattamie	Council Bluffs	47.865	77.031	47	US 275 north / Iowa 92 – Lake Manawa	Northern end of US 275 overlap
Pottawattamie	Council Bluffs	48.526	78.095	48A	I-80 / US 6 east – Des Moines	Signed as exit 48 southbound; I-80 west exits 4A-B
Pottawattamie	Council Bluffs	48.526	78.095	48B	I-80 Express / US 6 west – Omaha	Northbound exit and southbound entrance; I-80 east exit 4
Pottawattamie	Council Bluffs	49.230	79.228	49	South Expressway – Downtown	Former Iowa 192 north; formerly signed as exit 3 on old alignment
Pottawattamie	Council Bluffs	50.683	81.566	50	S. 24th Street – Mid-America Center	Formerly signed as exit 1B on old alignment
Pottawattamie	Council Bluffs	51.644	83.113	51	I-80 west – Omaha	I-80 east exits 1A-B
Pottawattamie	Council Bluffs	51.644	83.113	51	I-80 Express / US 6 east – Des Moines	Southern end of US 6 overlap; southbound exit and northbound entrance; I-80 west exit 1
Pottawattamie	Council Bluffs	52.378	84.294	52	Nebraska Avenue – Mid-America Center	
Pottawattamie	Council Bluffs	53.199	85.615	53A	9th Avenue / Harrah's Boulevard W. Broadway	Northbound exit and southbound entrance
Pottawattamie	Council Bluffs	53.777	86.546	53B	I-480 / US 6 west – Omaha, Eppley Airfield	Clockwise terminus of I-480; northern end of US 6 overlap; signed as exit 53 southbound
Pottawattamie	Council Bluffs	54.204	87.233	54	W. Broadway 9th Avenue / Harrah's Boulevard	Southbound exit and northbound entrance
Pottawattamie	Council Bluffs	55.715	89.665	55	N. 25th Street	
Pottawattamie	Council Bluffs	56.917	91.599	56	N. 16th Street – Council Bluffs, Business District	Southbound left exit and northbound entrance only; formerly Iowa 192
Pottawattamie	Crescent Township	61.966	99.725	61	I-680 west / CR G37 east – Crescent, North Omaha	Clockwise terminus of I-680; signed as exits 61A (east) and 61B (west)
Pottawattamie	Crescent–Rockford township line	66.465	106.965	66	Honey Creek (CR L19)	
Pottawattamie	Rockford Township	71.623	115.266	71	I-880 east – Des Moines	Western terminus of I-880; former I-680 east, originally I-80N
Pottawattamie	Rockford Township	71.988	115.853	72	CR G12 – Loveland, Wilson Island State Park	
Harrison	Missouri Valley	75.786	121.966	75	US 30 – Missouri Valley, Blair Nebraska	
Harrison	Taylor Township	82.088	132.108	82	CR F50 – Modale	
Harrison	Morgan Township	89.309	143.729	89	Iowa 127 east – Mondamin	
Harrison	Little Sioux Township	95.714	154.037	95	CR F20 – Little Sioux	
Monona	Sherman Township	105.347	169.540	105	CR K45 – Blencoe	
Monona	Onawa	112.326	180.771	112	Iowa 175 – Onawa, Decatur	
Monona	Lincoln–Lake township line	120.210	193.459	120	CR E24 – Whiting	
Woodbury	Sloan Township	127.571	205.306	127	Iowa 141 east – Sloan	
Woodbury	Salix	133.970	215.604	134	Salix (CR K25)	
Woodbury	Salix	135.708	218.401	135	Port Neal Landing (CR D51)	
Woodbury	Sergeant Bluff	141.194	227.230	141	Loess Hills National Scenic Byway south (CR D38) – Sergeant Bluff, Sioux Gateway Airport	Southern end of Loess Hills NSB overlap; access to airport via Aviation Boulevard (formerly Iowa 378)
Woodbury	Sioux City	143.413	230.801	143	US 75 Bus. north (Singing Hills Boulevard) – Bridgeport, Industrial Park	Southern end of US 75 Business overlap; US 75 Business southbound traffic follows I-29 northbound
Woodbury	Sioux City	144.473	232.507	144	I-129 west / US 75 Bus. ends / US 20 / US 75 – Le Mars, Fort Dodge, South Sioux City	Northern end of US 75 Business overlap; signed as exits 144A (east/north) and 144B (west/south); I-129 exits 1A-B
Woodbury	Sioux City	147.476	237.340	147	Floyd Boulevard / Virginia Street (US 20 Bus. east / Iowa 12 south)	Northern end of US 20 Business/Iowa 12 overlap; signed as exit 147A northbound
Woodbury	Sioux City	148.050	238.263	147B	Gordon Drive (US 20 Bus. / Iowa 12) / Nebraska Street	Northbound exit and southbound entrance only; serves MercyOne Siouxland Medical Center
Woodbury	Sioux City	148.493	238.976	148	US 77 south / US 20 Bus. west (Wesley Parkway) – South Sioux City	Southern end of US 20 Business overlap; southbound access via exit 149
Woodbury	Sioux City	149.081	239.923	149	To US 77 south / US 20 Bus. west (Wesley Parkway) / Hamilton Boulevard – Riverfront, South Sioux City	Northbound signed as "Hamilton Boulevard – Riverfront" only
Woodbury	Sioux City	151.365	243.598	151	Iowa 12 north (Riverside Boulevard) / Loess Hills National Scenic Byway – Akron	Northern end of Iowa 12/Loess Hills NSB overlap; IowaDOT signs this as southern end of Iowa 12
Big Sioux River		151.826	244.340	Iowa–South Dakota line		
Big Sioux River		151.826	244.340		I-29 north – Sioux Falls	Continuation into South Dakota
1.000 mi = 1.609 km; 1.000 km = 0.621 mi: Concurrency terminus; Incomplete access

Interstate 29
Previous state: Missouri	Iowa	Next state: South Dakota
