= Interstate 880 (Iowa) =

Auxiliary Interstate Highway in Iowa

Interstate 880
- I-880 highlighted in red

Route information
- Auxiliary route of I-80
- Maintained by Iowa DOT
- Length: 19.63 mi (31.59 km)
- Existed: October 5, 2019–present
- History: I-80N: 1966–1973; I-680: 1973–2019
- NHS: Entire route

Major junctions
- West end: I-29 near Loveland
- East end: I-80 near Neola

Location
- Country: United States
- State: Iowa
- Counties: Pottawattamie

Highway system
- Interstate Highway System; Main; Auxiliary; Suffixed; Business; Future; Iowa Primary Highway System; Interstate; US; State; Secondary; Scenic
← I-680	→ Iowa 906

Interstate 880 (I-880) is an auxiliary Interstate Highway in Iowa. Its route was created in 2019 from a section of I-680 in order to facilitate the movement of I-29 traffic around Council Bluffs in the event of Missouri River flooding. It follows the same routing as Interstate 80N (I-80N), which originally connected I-29 and I-80 from 1966 to 1973.

== Route description ==
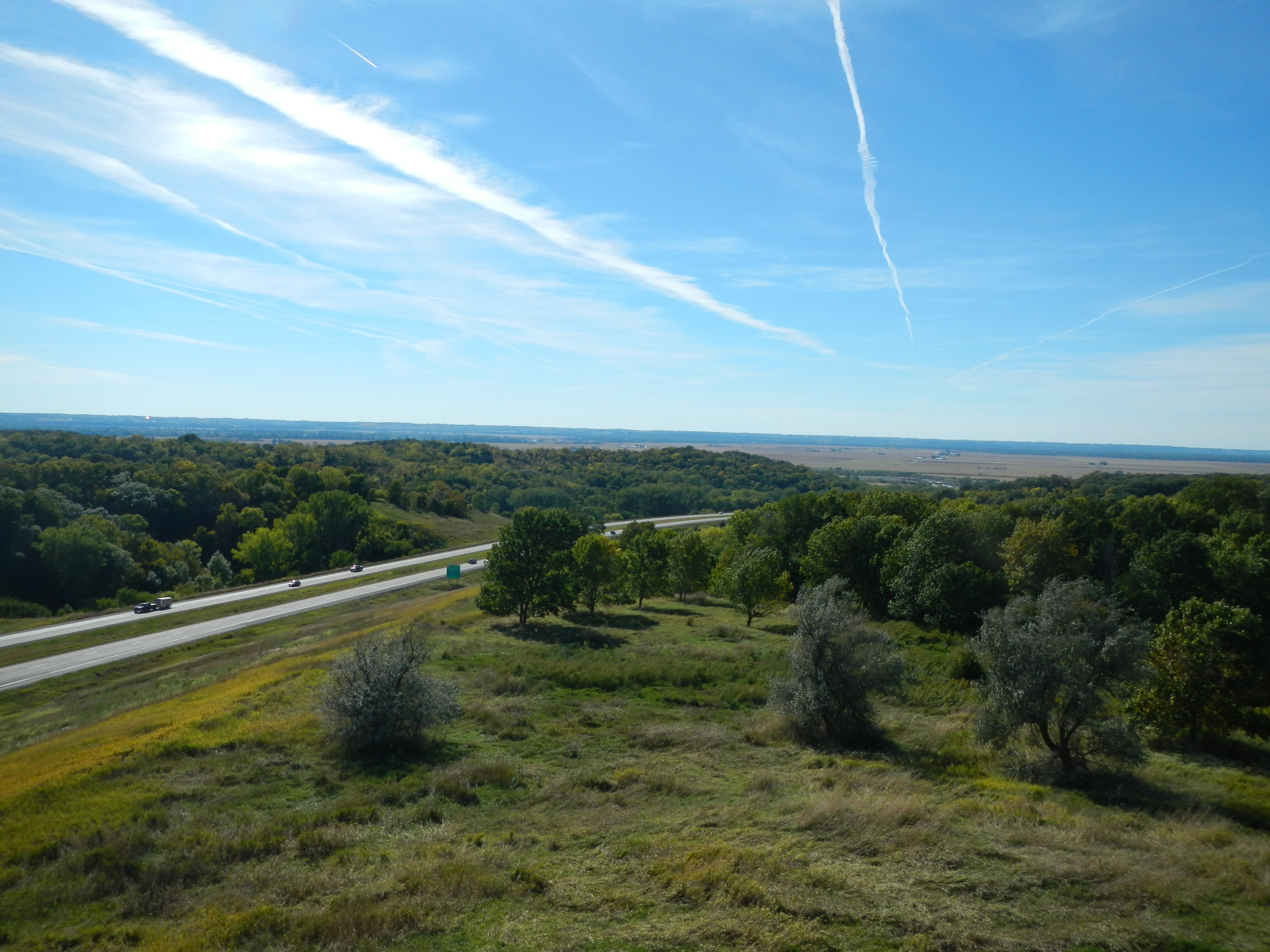
I-880, the Loess Hills, and the Missouri River valley as viewed from the Loveland overlook

I-880 begins at a trumpet interchange with I-29 in the Missouri River alluvial plain near Loveland, which lies in the northeastern quadrant of the interchange. The four-lane road curves east into the Loess Hills where the surrounding lands rise 300 feet (91 m) in elevation from the flood plain. Two miles (3.2 km) east of the I-29 interchange, there is a scenic overlook for westbound traffic. The Loveland overlook gives a view of the Loess Hills and Missouri River valley. East of the overlook, there are rest areas for each direction. Near the interchange with County Road L34 (CR L34), the road straightens out and heads generally due east until it reaches I-80. About 0.75 miles (1.21 km) before its eastern end, it meets Iowa Highway 191 (Iowa 191) and CR G8L. I-880 ends at a Y interchange with I-80 just northeast of Neola.

== History ==
Interstate 80N
- Location: Loveland to Neola
- Existed: 1966–1973

In the initial drafts of the Interstate Highway System in 1947, an east–west road that would come to be known as I-80 was drawn across the center of Iowa, with its western entry into the state in the Omaha–Council Bluffs metropolitan area.

To connect I-80 in Iowa to I-80 in Nebraska, two options for the route emerged. The first was to continue I-80's east–west path to a north–south junction near Loveland and then utilize the Mormon Bridge near Florence to cross into Nebraska. The second option routed I-80 to the southwest at Neola to Council Bluffs and then across the Nebraska–Iowa state line over the Missouri River into Omaha. The Iowa State Highway Commission preferred the Loveland route, but the Bureau of Public Roads (BPR) allowed the commission to proceed with both routes and determine the more important route later. Within two years, priorities and route numbers were assigned. The Loveland option would be known as I-80N and was given a slightly higher priority than the second option, which would carry the I-80 number.

Work on I-80N began in 1957; some overpasses and culverts were completed by 1960. Controversy began shortly even before construction began. Officials in Council Bluffs and Omaha were angered that the I-80N project took precedent over the mainline I-80 project that would pass through their cities. The head of the Iowa State Highway Commission at the time was Chris Larsen, a Republican from Sioux City. Larsen used his position on the commission to protect the interests of northwestern Iowa; he vowed to not support the I-80 project at all if the Loveland extension was not included. Without the extension, Larsen argued that all I-80 traffic would be routed through Council Bluffs and little traffic would travel north to Sioux City. Democrats on the commission discovered and announced in late 1957 that the commission had already purchased 375 acres (152 ha) of right-of-way for I-80N before any public meetings occurred and before the route was finalized. It was suggested that Larsen had begun construction on I-80N in order to futureproof it from changes by future commissions, a charge Larsen denied. Statewide construction priorities shifted, and, by the mid-1960s, I-80N was mostly graded but not paved. In the wake of the Larsen controversy, the commission affirmed a previous decision to complete I-80N before I-80 through Council Bluffs. They cited the previous grading and bridge work that had been completed as reasons to continue the project. In addition, BPR officials stated that such a project would not be approved in the future if there were more important projects. I-80N was open to traffic on December 13, 1966.

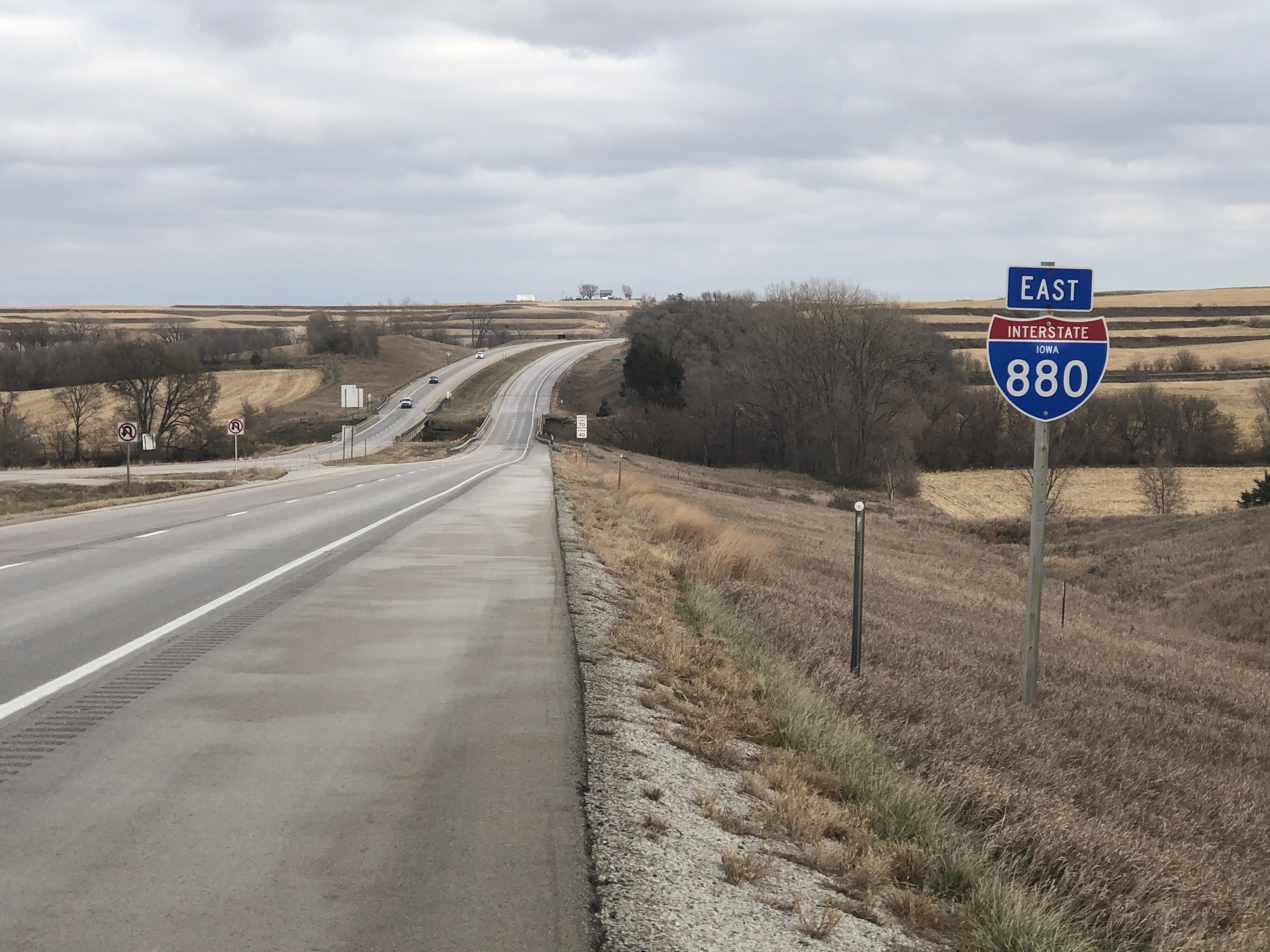
New I-880 reassurance sign just east of the onramp at the Logan–Beebeetown interchange (November 2019)

In the early 1970s, the American Association of State Highway and Transportation Officials (AASHTO) decided that Interstates with a directional suffix, such as I-80N, would have to be renumbered. By 1974, I-80N had been redesignated to I-680 to match Nebraska.

Throughout the 2010s, I-29 and I-680 were subjected to flooding from the adjacent Missouri River. Iowa DOT officials sought to reduce confusion among drivers who were forced to use I-680 and I-80 as a detour around floodwaters. They proposed to AASHTO to redesignate the section of I-680 in Iowa from Loveland to Neola as I-880. The plan was approved on October 5, 2019. I-880 would follow the same routing that I-80N had 50 years earlier. Iowa DOT updated its online maps and announced that the signage would be changed just weeks after the official approval by AASHTO.

== Exit list ==
The entire route is in Pottawattamie County.

Location	mi	km	Exit	Destinations	Notes
Loveland	0.000	0.000	0	I-29 to I-680 west – North Omaha, Sioux City	Signed as exits 0A (I-29 south) and 0B (I-29 north)
Boomer Township	8.162	13.135	8	CR L34 – Logan, Beebeetown	
Neola	15.749	25.346	15	Iowa 191 north / CR G8L south – Neola, Persia	
Neola	16.565	26.659	16	I-80 – Council Bluffs, Des Moines	Signed as exits 16A (east) and 16B (west)
1.000 mi = 1.609 km; 1.000 km = 0.621 mi
