= Glenn Cunningham Lake =

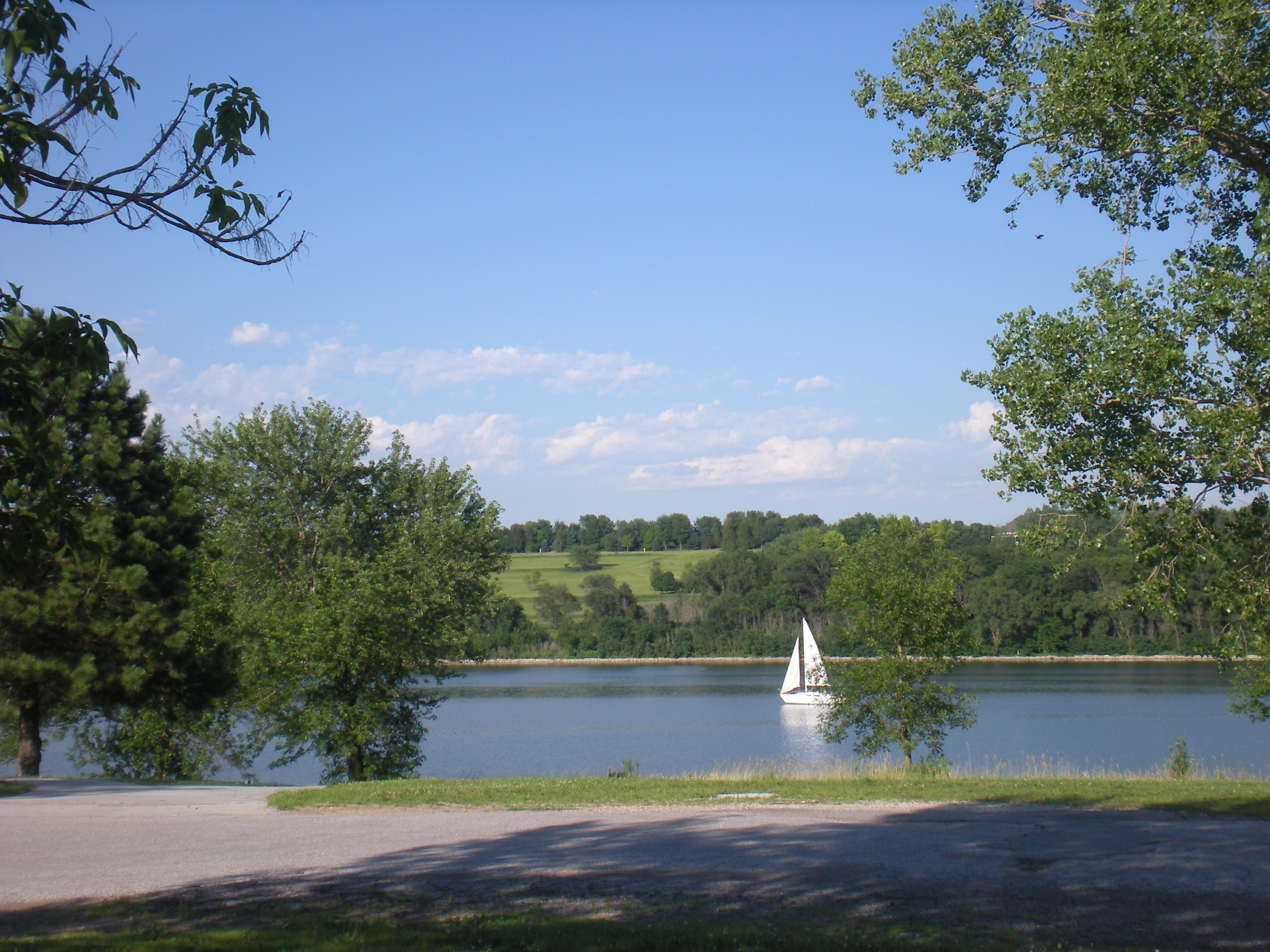

- Location within Nebraska Location within the United States
- Location: Omaha, Nebraska
- Coordinates: 41°21′04″N 96°03′21″W
- Type: reservoir
- Basin countries: United States
- Surface area: 390 acres (1.6 km^{2})
- Max. depth: 23 ft (7.0 m)
- Surface elevation: 1,122 ft (342 m)

Glenn Cunningham Lake is a 390-acre (1.6 km^{2}) reservoir located in Omaha, Nebraska, United States. The lake is located along 96th Street with entrances at State Highway 36, State Street, 96th Street and Rainwood Road. The lake is a part of Little Papillion Creek, which is part of the Papillion Creek watershed.

Glenn Cunningham Lake, named for former Omaha mayor and U.S. Congressman Glenn Cunningham, is located in north central Omaha. The lake project was constructed by the U.S. Army Corps of Engineers for flood control and recreation and opened to the public in 1977. The lake has a 390-acre (1.6 km^{2}) surface area and a maximum depth of approximately 23 ft (7 m). More than 1,050 acres (4 km^{2}) of parkland surround the lake, including 450 acres (1.8 km^{2}), north of Nebraska Highway 36, designated as wildlife area.

In 2006 the lake was drained and underwent an extensive ecosystem reconstruction which was completed in 2009. As of 2010 the lake itself has been fully restored and reopened for sailing and other public use.

In October 2018, the lake was again closed and drained due to invasive species.
