= Joseph E. Johnson (Mormon) =

American journalist

Joseph Ellis Johnson (April 28, 1817 – December 17, 1882) was an American Mormon newspaper proprietor, politician, and businessman.

== Becoming a Mormon ==
Johnson was born in Pomfret, Chautauqua County, New York. He moved to Kirtland, Ohio, in 1832 and was baptized into the Latter-Day Saint church in 1833. He taught school in Springfield, Illinois in 1840 and went to Nauvoo, Illinois, a center for the Latter Day Saints, in 1840. There he married Harriet Snider on October 6, 1840; the marriage was performed by Joseph Smith, founder of the Latter Day Saint movement and The Church of Jesus Christ of Latter-day Saints.

Johnson accompanied Joseph and Hyrum Smith on their way to Carthage Jail the day before the Smiths were murdered. Johnson was taken prisoner when the mob entered Nauvoo.

== Iowa ==
After the majority of Latter Day Saints abandoned Nauvoo, Johnson went to Kanesville, Iowa, in 1848, where he built the first house in Pottawattamie County, Iowa. Johnson was postmaster at Council Bluffs for five years. In this position, Johnson obtained the change of the settlement's name from Kanesville to Council Bluffs. He was a member of the first city council for several years. He established the Council Bluffs Bugle in 1852; the Bugle was vocal in supporting the establishment of Omaha as the capital of Nebraska Territory.

Johnson opened the first store in Omaha and sent the first train of goods to the Cherry Creek mines in Denver, Colorado. In 1854, he published the Omaha Arrow, the first newspaper published in Nebraska, and the same year accompanied the first party of explorers for a railroad crossing on the Missouri River and Loupe Fork of the Platte River. Johnson wrote the first article published favoring the North Platte route for the Pacific Railroad.

Johnson crossed the plains to Utah Territory and back in 1850. In 1857, he started the Crescent City Oracle and laid out Crescent, Iowa. In 1858, he published the Council Bluffs Press. From 1858 to 1861, he published The Huntsman's Echo at Wood River, Nebraska.

== Utah ==
In 1861, Johnson moved to Utah Territory. He traveled in the pioneer company of Sixtus E. Johnson, which had about 200 people. In 1863, he established the Farmer's Oracle at Spring Lake Villa, Utah County, and was elected to the House of Representatives in the Utah territorial legislature. In 1864–65, he moved to St. George and began a supply garden and nursery. In 1868–69 he published Our Dixie Times, afterward the Rio Virgen Times [sic]. In 1870, Johnson began publishing the Utah Pomologist and Gardener as a monthly. In 1876, he went to Silver Reef and built a store and printing office, but sold part of the office before the newspaper was started. In 1879 the store was burned out, with others. He restored the store immediately, but on a larger scale.

In 1882, Johnson moved at his church's call, this time to settle what would become Tempe, Arizona. He died in Tempe and was buried at the City of Mesa Cemetery.
