= Crescent, Iowa =

- City
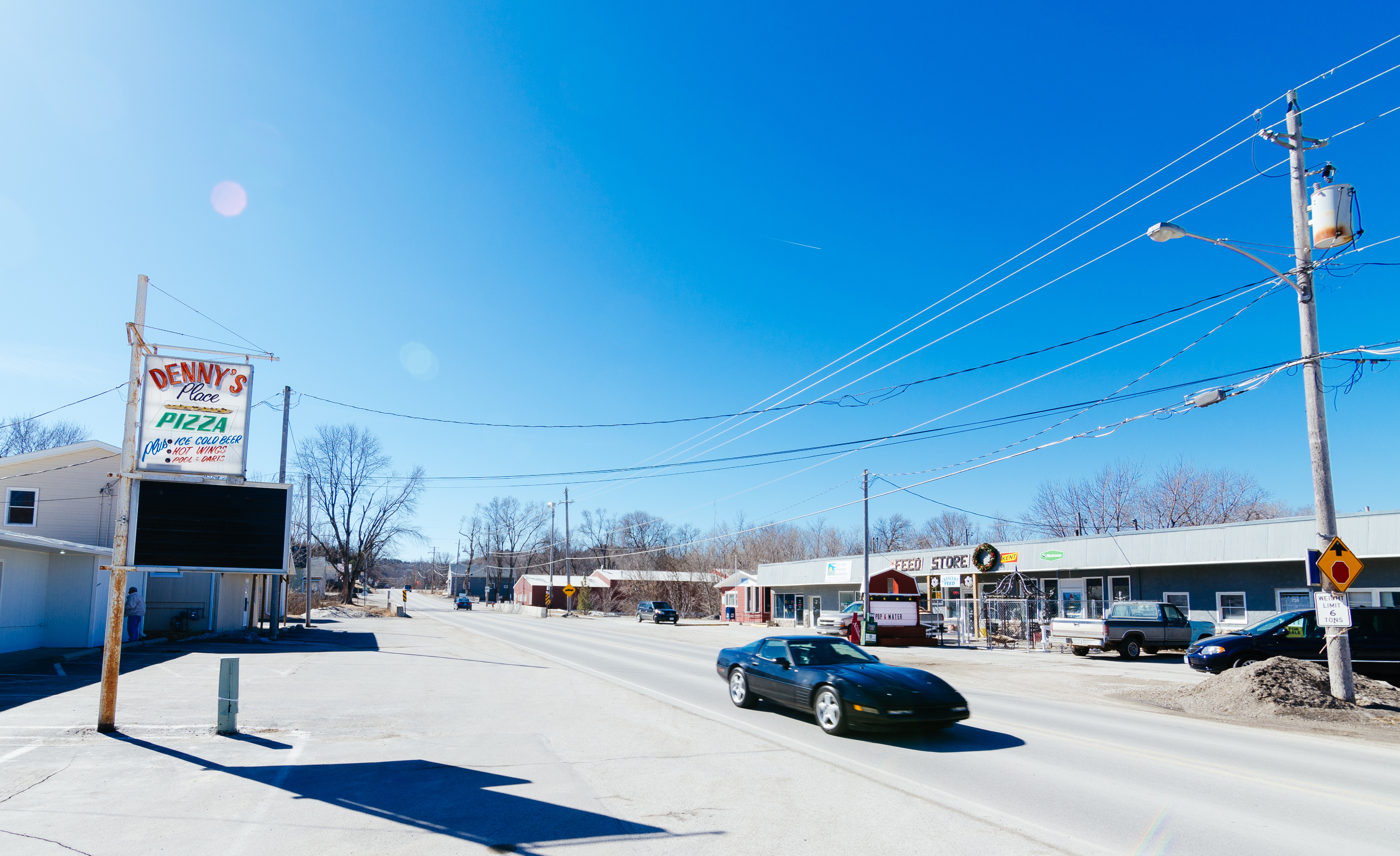
- Old Lincoln Highway

- Location of Crescent, Iowa

- Location within Iowa Location within the United States
- Coordinates: 41°21′49″N 95°51′52″W
- Country: USA
- State: Iowa
- County: Pottawattamie
- Township: Crescent

Government
  - Type: Mayor-council

Area
  - Total: 0.97 sq mi (2.51 km^{2})
  - Land: 0.97 sq mi (2.50 km^{2})
  - Water: 0.0039 sq mi (0.01 km^{2})
- Elevation: 1,011 ft (308 m)

Population (2020)
  - Total: 628
  - Density: 649.3/sq mi (250.71/km^{2})
- Time zone: UTC-6 (Central (CST))
  - Summer (DST): UTC-5 (CDT)
- ZIP code: 51526
- Area code: 712
- FIPS code: 19-17175
- GNIS feature ID: 2393668
- Website: City of Crescent

Crescent is a city in Pottawattamie County, Iowa, United States. The population was 628 at the 2020 census.

== Geography ==
According to the United States Census Bureau, the city has a total area of 1.09 square miles (2.82 km^{2}), all land.

The city lies directly across the Mormon Bridge from North Omaha, and is located at the base of the Loess Hills. The Mount Crescent skiing area lies near the town, and is the nearest ski and snowboarding slope to the Omaha-Council Bluffs metropolitan area. In the summer the area serves as a recreational facility for activities such as paintball and cross-country running. Neighboring Hitchcock Park supports various types of wildlife and many miles of hiking trails.

== History ==
Crescent was originally laid out by Joseph E. Johnson, a Latter-day Saint who also published a paper there in the 1850s. Before the near universal exodus of the Mormons to Utah in 1852, (many left beginning in 1847, but they were the majority of the population until 1852) the area was known as Brownell's Grove and Farmersville.

Crescent had about 300 residents in 1950.

== Demographics ==
Historical populations
Year	Pop.	±%
1880	134	—
1890	144	+7.5%
1900	167	+16.0%
1910	188	+12.6%
1920	200	+6.4%
1930	221	+10.5%
1940	255	+15.4%
1950	300	+17.6%
1960	296	−1.3%
1970	284	−4.1%
1980	547	+92.6%
1990	469	−14.3%
2000	537	+14.5%
2010	617	+14.9%
2020	628	+1.8%
Source:"U.S. Census website". United States Census Bureau. and Iowa Data Center; Source: U.S. Decennial Census

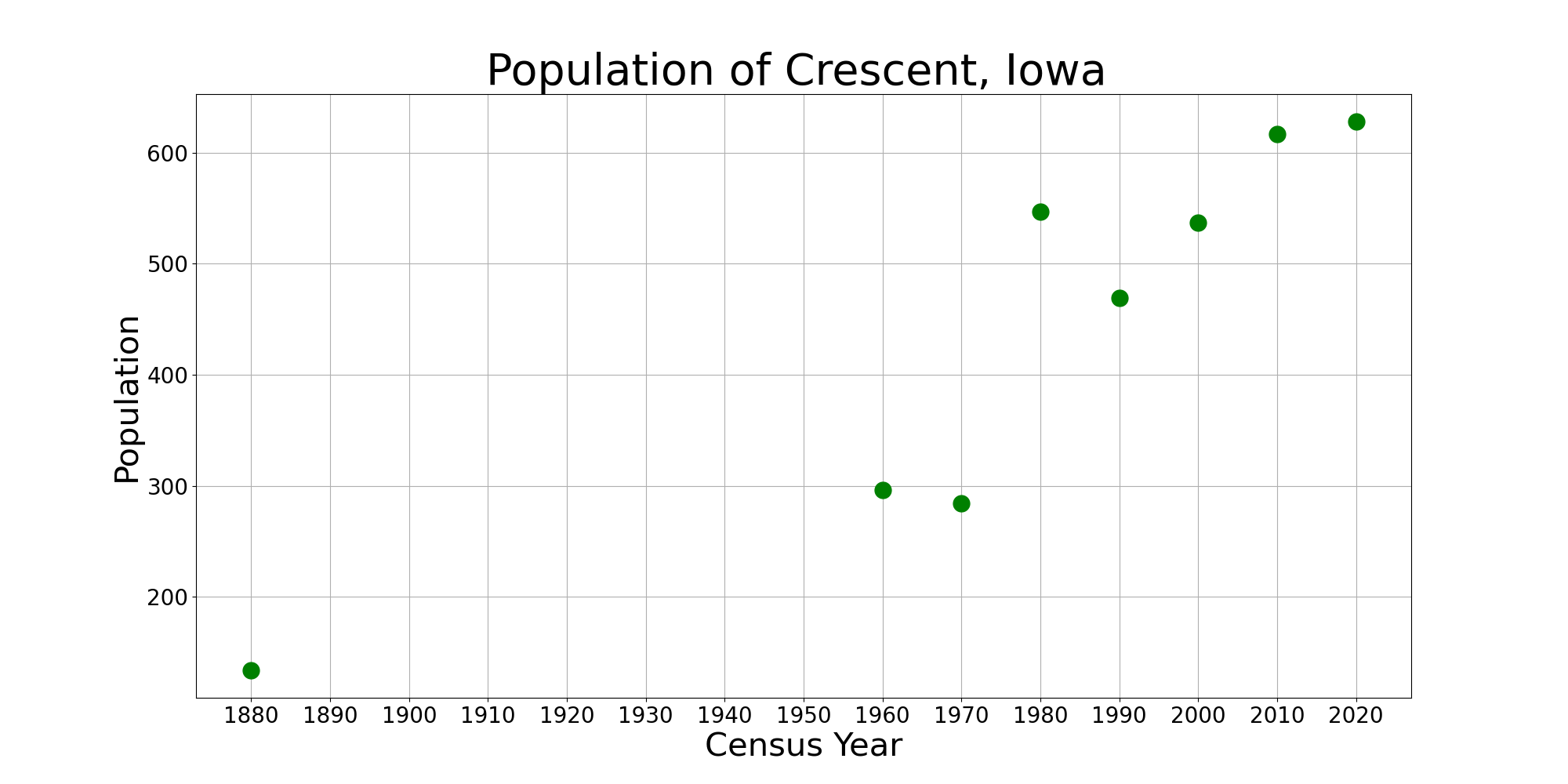
The population of Crescent, Iowa from US census data

=== 2020 census ===
As of the census of 2020, there were 628 people, 244 households, and 192 families residing in the city. The population density was 649.3 inhabitants per square mile (250.7/km^{2}). There were 255 housing units at an average density of 263.7 per square mile (101.8/km^{2}). The racial makeup of the city was 96.3% White, 0.2% Black or African American, 0.0% Native American, 0.3% Asian, 0.0% Pacific Islander, 0.2% from other races and 3.0% from two or more races. Hispanic or Latino persons of any race comprised 1.3% of the population.

Of the 244 households, 34.4% of which had children under the age of 18 living with them, 63.5% were married couples living together, 7.4% were cohabitating couples, 13.1% had a female householder with no spouse or partner present and 16.0% had a male householder with no spouse or partner present. 21.3% of all households were non-families. 18.0% of all households were made up of individuals, 8.2% had someone living alone who was 65 years old or older.

The median age in the city was 43.9 years. 24.7% of the residents were under the age of 20; 3.5% were between the ages of 20 and 24; 23.4% were from 25 and 44; 29.1% were from 45 and 64; and 19.3% were 65 years of age or older. The gender makeup of the city was 49.0% male and 51.0% female.

=== 2010 census ===
As of the census of 2010, there were 617 people, 235 households, and 177 families living in the city. The population density was 566.1 inhabitants per square mile (218.6/km^{2}). There were 241 housing units at an average density of 221.1 per square mile (85.4/km^{2}). The racial makeup of the city was 98.4% White, 0.2% Native American, 0.2% from other races, and 1.3% from two or more races. Hispanic or Latino of any race were 1.8% of the population.

There were 235 households, of which 28.5% had children under the age of 18 living with them, 68.1% were married couples living together, 4.7% had a female householder with no husband present, 2.6% had a male householder with no wife present, and 24.7% were non-families. 17.0% of all households were made up of individuals, and 6.8% had someone living alone who was 65 years of age or older. The average household size was 2.63 and the average family size was 2.99.

The median age in the city was 44.1 years. 20.3% of residents were under the age of 18; 7.1% were between the ages of 18 and 24; 24.3% were from 25 to 44; 35.3% were from 45 to 64; and 13% were 65 years of age or older. The gender makeup of the city was 50.7% male and 49.3% female.

=== 2000 census ===
As of the census of 2000, there were 537 people, 192 households, and 153 families living in the city. The population density was 426.9 inhabitants per square mile (164.8/km^{2}). There were 195 housing units at an average density of 155.0 per square mile (59.8/km^{2}). The racial makeup of the city was 98.32% White, 0.93% Native American, 0.19% Asian, and 0.56% from two or more races. Hispanic or Latino of any race were 0.19% of the population.

There were 192 households, out of which 33.9% had children under the age of 18 living with them, 70.8% were married couples living together, 5.7% had a female householder with no husband present, and 20.3% were non-families. 15.6% of all households were made up of individuals, and 6.3% had someone living alone who was 65 years of age or older. The average household size was 2.80 and the average family size was 3.15.

In the city, the population was spread out, with 25.9% under the age of 18, 8.8% from 18 to 24, 28.1% from 25 to 44, 27.4% from 45 to 64, and 9.9% who were 65 years of age or older. The median age was 37 years. For every 100 females, there were 98.2 males. For every 100 females age 18 and over, there were 99.0 males.

The median income for a household in the city was $60,000, and the median income for a family was $61,042. Males had a median income of $32,917 versus $29,125 for females. The per capita income for the city was $24,548. About 3.1% of families and 2.5% of the population were below the poverty line, including none of those under age 18 and 11.1% of those age 65 or over.
