= Mormon Bridge =

Bridge linking Iowa and Nebraska over the Missouri River

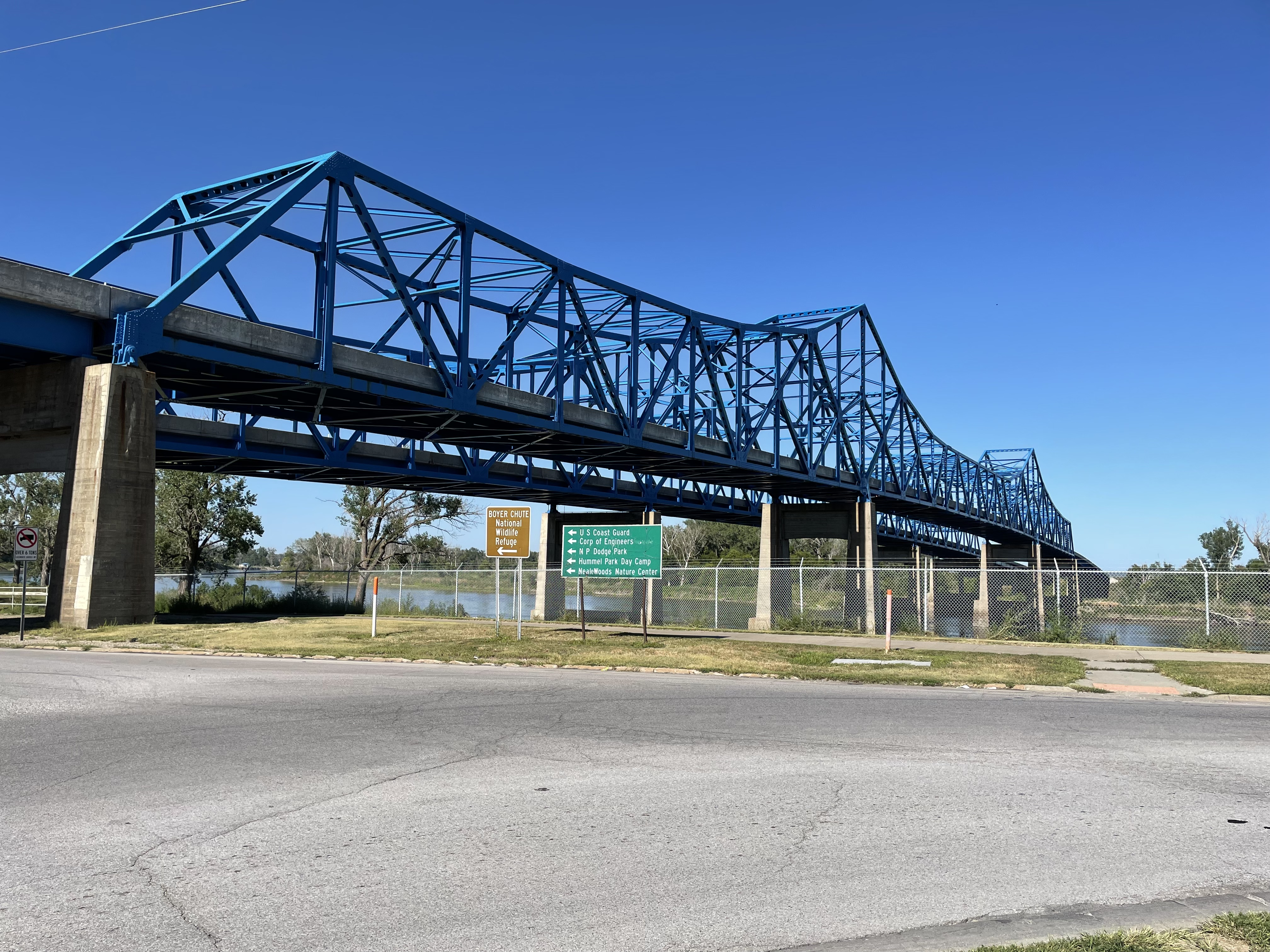
- Mormon Bridge in August 2022 as seen from North Omaha, Nebraska going into Iowa.
- Coordinates: 41.345556°N 95.957222°W
- Carries: 4 lanes of I-680
- Crosses: Missouri River
- Locale: Pottawattamie County, Iowa and Florence, Nebraska
- Other name(s): Missouri River I-680 Bridge
- Maintained by: Nebraska Department of Transportation

Characteristics
- Design: Twin Cantilever Through truss bridge
- Total length: 1,603.1 feet (489 m)
- Longest span: 128 m
- Clearance above: 18.1 feet (6 m)

History
- Opened: 1952; 73 years ago (eastbound); 1975; 50 years ago (westbound)

Statistics
- Daily traffic: 7,845

The Mormon Bridge is a bridge composed of two cantilevers that crosses the Missouri River connecting Pottawattamie County, Iowa with the Florence neighborhood of Omaha, Nebraska via Interstate 680 (Iowa-Nebraska). The bridge is officially called the Mormon Pioneer Memorial Bridge due to its location on the historic Mormon Trail, which passed nearby.

== History ==
The earliest consistent crossing of the Missouri River at the current bridge's location dates back to 1846, when the Mormons operated a ferry at this location as a component of the Mormon Trail. Ferries continued to be operated sporadically at this location over the course of the next decade, however, the section of the Missouri was considered ideal for a bridge due to the riverbed being rock. According to the program from the opening ceremonies, the first attempt to bridge the Missouri was made in 1856. This attempt, by the Florence Bridge Company, obtained Congressional approval, but was not completed due to funding constraints. In 1872, the site was considered by Union Pacific prior to their construction of the Union Pacific Missouri River Bridge and in 1885, construction actually began on a Chicago, St. Paul, Minneapolis, and Omaha Railway bridge before being abandoned.

Attempts to build a bridge were also made in 1922 and 1936, however, it was not until the 1950s that a bridge was finally completed. Previous attempts had required a specific franchise from the United States Congress to cross a navigable waterway. In 1946, Congress passed the General Bridges Act, which allowed for "construction, maintenance, and operation of bridges and approaches thereto over the navigable waters of the United States" by public bodies and repealed provisions of the Rivers and Harbors Act of 1899. This allowed the State of Nebraska to pass legislation creating the North Omaha Bridge Commission and put the wheels in motion for the successful establishment of a permanent river crossing.

The first bridge was dedicated on June 1, 1953, following a groundbreaking in May 1951. It connected Nebraska Highway 36 with unsigned Iowa Highway 988. It was originally a toll bridge operated by the North Omaha Bridge Commission in order to pay off the $3.45 million in bonds issued to finance construction. Spencer W. Kimball, President of the Church of Jesus Christ of Latter-day Saints (LDS Church), was the last to pay the toll on April 21, 1979, when the second bridge to the north of the original bridge was added, and it became part of the Interstate Highway System.

In 2018, the original bridge underwent an $11 million refurbishment that involved lead paint remediation, repairs to the bridge deck, and a new asphalt driving surface.

== See also ==
- List of crossings of the Missouri River
- History of North Omaha, Nebraska
- Timeline of North Omaha, Nebraska history
- List of Omaha landmarks
