= Nebraska State Highway System =

Highway system in Nebraska, United States

State Highway System
- Highway markers for Interstate 80, US Highway 30, and N-2

- A map of state highways in the state of Nebraska; Interstates US Highways State; Spurs Links

System information
- Maintained by NDOT
- Length: 9,942 mi (16,000 km)
- Formed: 1895 as State Board of Irrigation; 1933 as Department of Roads

Highway names
- Interstates: Interstate X (I-X)
- US Highways: US Highway X (US-X)
- State: Highway X (N-X)
- Link: Link L-XY (L-XY)
- Spur: Spur S-XY (S-XY)
- Recreation Road: Recreation Road R-XY (R-XY)

System links
- Nebraska State Highway System; Interstate; US; State; Link; Spur; State Spurs; Recreation

The Nebraska State Highway System consists of all the state highways in Nebraska maintained by the Nebraska Department of Transportation. This includes federally designated Interstates and US Highways as well as state highways, links and spurs. The system comprises 9,942 miles (16,000 km) of state highways in all 93 counties. Highways within the system range in scale and quality from 10-lane urban freeways, such as I-80 around Omaha, to standard two-lane rural undivided highways as well as 39 miles (63 km) of state highways that remain unpaved such as N-67 north of Dunbar. Surrounding landscapes along the highway system range from the urban areas in Omaha and Lincoln to scenic journeys through uninhabited grasslands in the Nebraska Sandhills.

Prior to the state highways, travel across Nebraska was accomplished via foot and wagon trails. The Oregon Trail, a historic wheeled wagon route that ran from Illinois to Oregon runs through Nebraska from the Kansas border near Fairbury then north to the Platte River which it follows west into Wyoming. The Mormon Trail is a 1,300-mile (2,100 km) route that members of the Church of Jesus Christ of Latter-day Saints traveled from 1846 to 1868 which also generally follows the Platte River from Omaha to Wyoming. The Pony Express National Historic Trail stretches across Nebraska from near Fairbury, NE north to the Platte River then west along the river to Wyoming with a detour near Julesburg.

Responsibility for general improvements to roads mostly fell to the counties of Nebraska. In 1926, the Nebraska Bureau of Roads and Bridges began erecting route markers along highways, the first of which contained the famous covered wagon emblem, developed by State Engineer Robert Cochran, that is still in use today. Over the next couple of decades the state struggled with continued maintenance of the existing highway system and stagnant funding as well as difficulty procuring necessary materials with the onset of World War II.

In 1950s, the passage of the Federal Aid Highway Act which established the Interstate Highway System provided an infusion of funding to Nebraska and allowed it to construct new highways as part of the new system. This included Interstate 80 which travels 455 miles (732 km) across the state. Completed in 1974 at a cost of $390 million (equivalent to $1.92 billion in 2024), Nebraska was the first state in the nation to complete its mainline contribution to the interstate system.

== Highway systems ==
There are six different types of highways maintained by NDOT as part of the overall state highway system. In addition to Interstates, U.S. Routes, and State Highways the state also maintains a system of Link and Spur highways as well as Recreational Roads.

=== Spurs and links ===
Spurs serve as connections between rural communities and the mainline highways. An example of this includes Nebraska Spur 14C which connects the small rural town of Magnet to Nebraska Highway 59. Links serve as connections between other mainline highways, providing access to rural communities and as alternative paths between highways. An example of this includes Nebraska Link 10B which connects US 30 and Interstate 80 near the town of Odessa. These highways are named with a number and letter combination that indicates the order of addition of that route within a particular county or region.

=== Recreational Roads ===
Recreational Roads are part of the state highway system. They are designated by the Nebraska Game and Parks Commission, but maintenance is provided by NDOT. They are usually not signed and are not included in the official Nebraska highway route log unless they intersect another state highway.

== Signage ==
Modern route marker for Nebraska Highway 2

The need for appropriate signage on state highways had been apparent in the early 1920s, but Nebraska held off until the development of a national standard. In 1925, the American Association of State Highway Officials adopted standard designs for signs. The following year the Nebraska Department of Public Works began placing numbered markers along the state highways. The state adopted a 15-inch diamond, black-on-white text with the image of a covered wagon occupying the top half and the route number on the bottom half, a design created by State Engineer Robert L. Cochran. The oxen-and-wagon symbol later became the official state symbol of Nebraska. The modern version of the route markers are square or rectangular with a white trapezoidal field set on a black background with the state name, route number and covered wagon design in black.

== History ==
=== 1800s ===
Prior to 1900s, travel across Nebraska was extremely difficult. Roads were few and far between and as you traveled west from Omaha, any roads that did exist were simply two ruts in the prairie. Prior to World War I the transportation needs of the country were mostly met by steamboats and railways. Farmers experienced difficulties delivering their harvest to markets, especially so when heavy rains caused any trails to become impassible muddy quagmires. As the desire for public, well maintained roads grew, the State of Nebraska recognized this need and passed laws permitting counties to build roads and levy taxes as well as designating section lines as roads.

In 1855, Congress appropriated funds for the construction of a military road from Omaha to Fort Kearney and the Territorial Legislature passed a law on January 26, 1856 placing the authority for construction of roads with the counties through which they ran. It gave the counties the power to levy taxes and appropriate labor for construction. In 1860, a project to build a 190-mile-long (310 km) road from Nebraska City to Fort Kearney was initiated by the Nebraska City community and Otoe County Commissioners in what became one of the most traveled roads in the west as part of the Denver Trail. In 1879, the Nebraska Legislature passed a law providing all section lines become public roads. By 1904, Nebraska had almost 80,000 miles (130,000,000 m) of roads, the majority of which were section line roads, the condition of which were usually poor.

During the late 19th century, various interest groups began putting pressure on the Federal Government to examine its role in national road development. Groups such as the Good Roads Movement lobbied local, state and federal officials on the benefits of a good road network, not just for bicyclists, but for the benefit of rural communities and farmers. In response to this movement, U.S. Secretary of Agriculture and former acting governor of Nebraska, Julius Sterling Morton set up the Office of Road Inquiry within the Department of Agriculture to investigate the condition of roads throughout the nation. The automobile increased the demand for better roads. Farmers, in particular, pressed for improved farm-to-market roads as they began purchasing automobiles to transport their goods. The Federal Government struggled with their role in the development of an improved road network. In 1912, Congress passed the Post Office Appropriation Act which allotted $500,000 (equivalent to $11.7 million in 2024) for rural road construction to improve mail delivery.

=== Early 1900s ===
Entrepreneur Carl Graham Fisher envisioned a transcontinental highway, allowing vehicular travel from Jersey City to San Francisco. The plans for this road, named the Lincoln Highway, went through Omaha and across the entire state of Nebraska. On December 12, 1914, the first charter meeting of the American Association of State Highway Officials (AASHO) met in Washington, D.C. to form an association of state highway officials and draft a federal aid road bill. The bill promoted cooperation between the states and federal government, as equals, in the development and improvement of the nation's highways. President Woodrow Wilson signed the Federal Aid Road Act of 1916 which provided $75 million (equivalent to $1.49 billion in 2024) in federal money in 50–50 matching funds to the states for improving up to six percent of their statewide roads over a five-year period.

By 1914, Nebraska had three major highways, the Meridian Highway, the Lincoln Highway and the Omaha–Lincoln–Denver (OLD) Highway. While, overall, these highways were in good shape, as they progressed west, they deteriorated into deeply rutted trails.

When the Federal Aid Road Act of 1916 was signed into law the Nebraska Legislature wasted no time and appropriated $640,000 (equivalent to $12.7 million in 2024) to match the appropriation from the Federal Road Fund and authorized the State Board of Irrigation, Highways, and Draining (a predecessor to the Department of Roads) to begin construction. As part of this, the board worked with county officials to devise a plan to connect all county seats in the state with approximately 5,000 miles (8,047 km) of highways. During the 1920s the state began to lay gravel for state highways and by the end of the decade ranked 14th in the nation in state highway mileage that was graveled or better.

In 1926, the Nebraska Bureau of Roads and Bridges began erecting the first state and U.S. Highway markers. Prior to that, signage along highways was non-existent except along the Lincoln Highway where the Automobile Association of California erected red, white and blue enameled steel signs and along the Omaha-Lincoln-Denver highway where local citizens painted route markers on telephone poles. The covered wagon emblazoned on the Nebraska state highway shield was designed by State Engineer Robert Cochran.

World War II brought highway construction to a stand still in most of the country, however for national security purposes, the War Department and the Public Roads Administration identified a system of highways throughout the nation which was crucial for military purposes. This Strategic Network of Highways included US 75, US 30A, US 30, US 81, US 275 and US 281 in Nebraska. In 1941 the first four-lane divided highway was completed along US 73/75 from Omaha south to Fort Crook.

The conversion of gravel highways to hard surfacing became a priority of the department in 1950s, but limited funding meant this plan had to be executed strategically. As such, the department engineers developed a sufficiency rating system to prioritize projects based on their condition, economic factors, safety and service.

As funding became an issue and keeping up with maintenance of the existing highway system became difficult, the department realized the public needed to be more aware of the need for proper funding and as a result developed the State Highway Commission in 1953 to act in an advisory capacity to the State Engineer and to formulate a highway system to be financed with revenue produced by highway user taxes.

=== Interstate Highway System ===
In 1956, President Dwight D. Eisenhower signed the Federal Aid Highway Act which authorized the construction of the National System of Interstate and Defense Highways. This set the stage for a more aggressive approach to the state highway system than before by providing $168 million (equivalent to $1.48 billion in 2024) for highway construction before the end of the decade. The first projects under the new act involved the relocation of US 30 east of Kimball. This 14.8-mile (23.8 km) section was completed in October 1955 and would later become a portion of Interstate 80 in December 1973. The department's first Interstate project was a 6.4-mile (10.3 km) section of I-80 near Gretna that began in June 1957 and opened to traffic in November 1959, ushering in the era of Interstate Highway travel in Nebraska.

The Interstate continued to be the focus of development throughout 1960s and 1970s with I-180 completed in 1964, I-76 in 1969, I-480 in 1970, I-80 in 1974, I-680 in 1975 and I-129 in 1977. With the completion of I-80 across the state, Nebraska became the first state in the nation to complete its mainline portion of the Interstate System; I-80 would not be complete nationwide until 1986.
