= Crescent Township, Pottawattamie County, Iowa =

Township in Pottawattamie County, Iowa, U.S.

Coordinates: 41.3738°N 95.8904°W

Crescent Township is a township in Pottawattamie County, Iowa, United States.

== History ==
Crescent Township is named from the shape of river bluffs along the Missouri River.
