= Interstate 480 (Nebraska–Iowa) =

Highway in Iowa and Nebraska

Interstate 480
- Gerald R. Ford Expressway
- I-480 highlighted in red

Route information
- Auxiliary route of I-80
- Maintained by NDOT and Iowa DOT
- Length: 4.9 mi (7.9 km) Nebraska: 4.15 mi (6.68 km); Iowa: 0.75 mi (1.21 km)
- Existed: November 21, 1966–present
- NHS: Entire route

Major junctions
- South end: I-80 / US 75 in Omaha, NE
- US 75 in Omaha, NE; US 6 in Omaha, NE
- East end: I-29 / US 6 in Council Bluffs, IA

Location
- Country: United States
- States: Nebraska; Iowa
- Counties: NE; Douglas; IA; Pottawattamie

Highway system
- Interstate Highway System; Main; Auxiliary; Suffixed; Business; Future
← US 385	NE	→ I-680
← Iowa 415	IA	→ I-680

Interstate 480 (I-480) is a 4.9-mile-long (7.9 km) auxiliary Interstate Highway that connects I-80 in Downtown Omaha, Nebraska, with I-29 in Council Bluffs, Iowa. The portion of I-480 in Nebraska has been named the Gerald R. Ford Expressway, named in honor of the former president, who was a native of Omaha. For most of its length, I-480 is overlapped by a US Highway: for two miles (3.2 km) with US Highway 75 (US 75) and for one mile (1.6 km) with US 6. I-480 includes the Grenville Dodge Memorial Bridge over the Missouri River.

== Route description ==
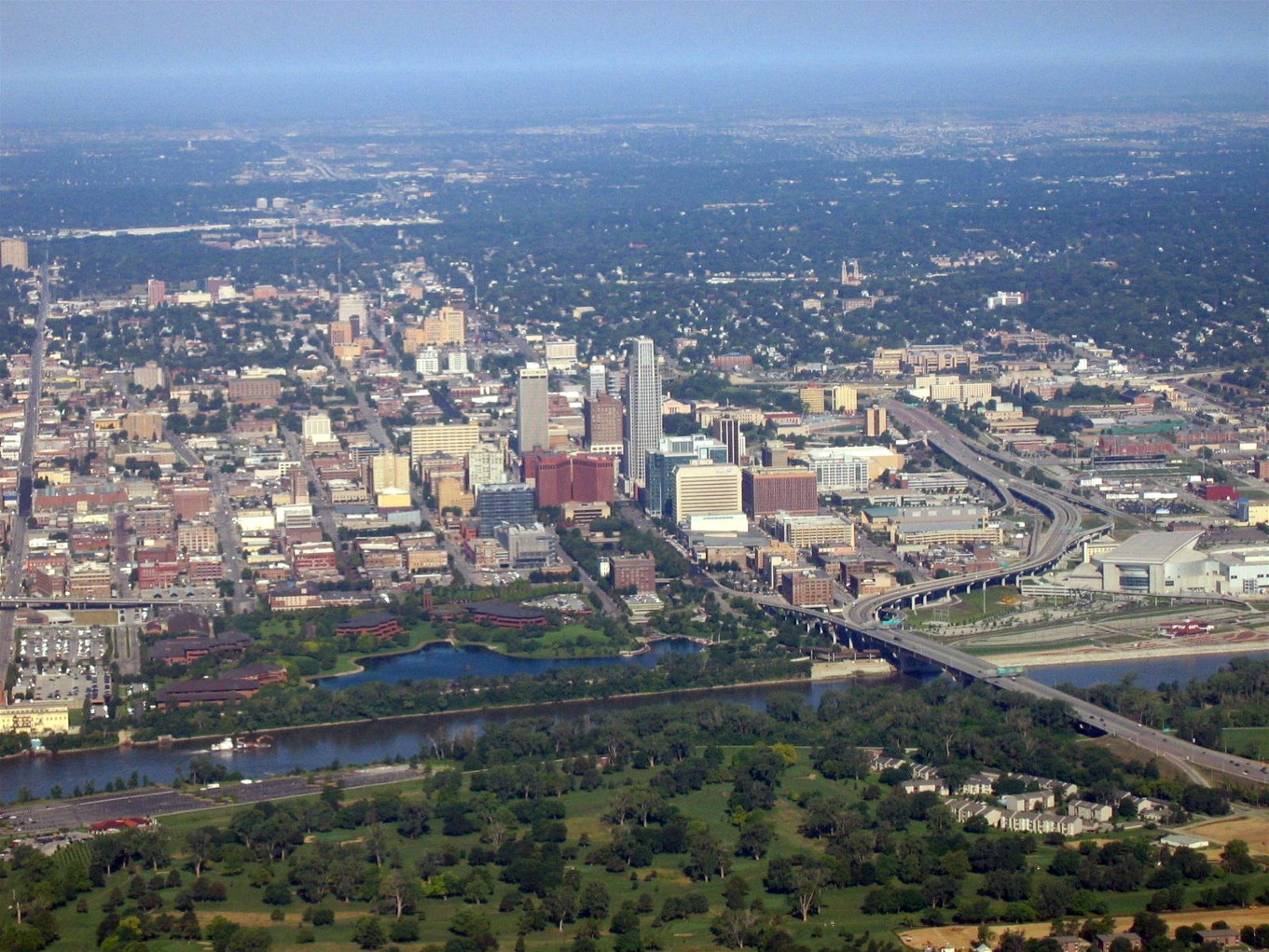
An aerial view of Downtown Omaha with I-480 skirting the northern edge

I-480 begins at an interchange with I-80 to the east and west and with US 75, known as the Kennedy Freeway, to the south. Going north, I-480 passes the Hanscom Park neighborhood to the west and the Vinton Street Commercial Historic District to the east. At exit 1A, I-480 intersects Martha Street, which before January 1, 2003, was the eastern end of Nebraska Highway 38 (N-38). North of Martha Street, I-480 passes the Gerald R. Ford Birthsite and Gardens. At the Leavenworth Street exit, the highway divides the Leavenworth neighborhood from the Old Market neighborhood. Shortly after the Leavenworth Street exit is the Harney Street exit, which provides access to US 6 from eastbound I-480. before the North Freeway interchange, I-480 passes beneath Dodge and Douglas streets, which are the westbound and eastbound lanes of US 6, respectively.

Just to the southwest of the Creighton University campus is the North Freeway interchange, where US 75 leaves eastbound I-480 and joins westbound. The North Freeway was originally planned to be an Interstate Highway, "I-580", connecting northern Omaha to downtown, but this project was canceled with the interchange in midst of construction. A number of so-called ghost ramps can be found, but these are being eliminated during the reconstruction of this interchange. Here, I-480 turns to the east toward Council Bluffs, Iowa. I-480 passes between the NoDo and Downtown Omaha neighborhoods. Farther east, it dips to the southeast near CHI Health Center Omaha, part of the NoDo neighborhood. Immediately before crossing the Missouri River, US 6 joins I-480 to cross into Iowa. This bridge over the Missouri River was constructed in 1965–1966 to replace the old Ak-Sar-Ben Bridge which had been the first highway bridge across the river in this area.

Upon entering Council Bluffs, I-480 meets up with I-29 just 0.75 miles (1.21 km) from the Missouri River. On the other side of this interchange, I-480 ends where US 6 traffic encounters signal-controlled intersections.

== History ==
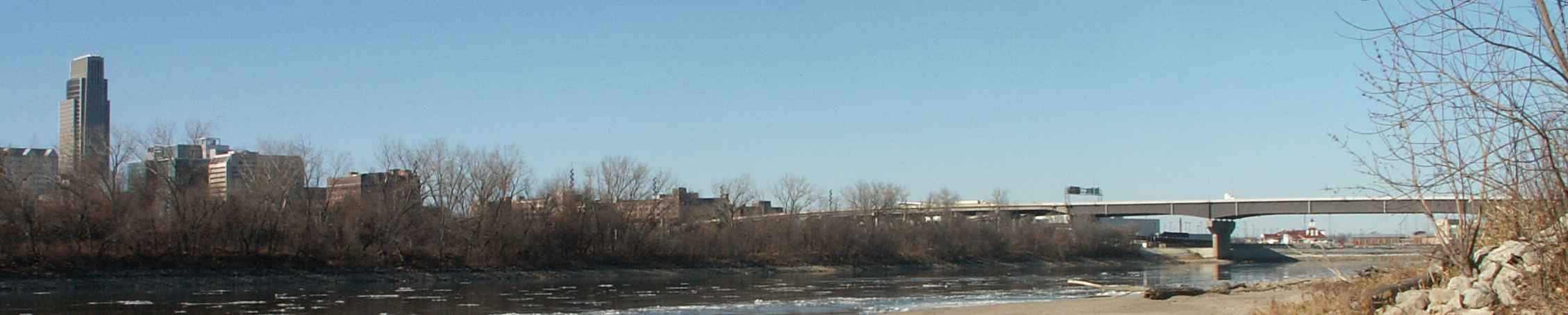
The I-480 bridge over the Missouri River between Council Bluffs, Iowa, and Downtown Omaha, Nebraska.

In the late 1950s, the construction of what was then referred to as Route 3 was highly controversial. It conveniently crossed through the western and northern edges of Downtown Omaha, two areas city leaders had considered "blighted" since the 1930s. The heavily Catholic, ethnic European neighborhoods the route went through rallied against the demolition of their homes, and the city's parks advocates provided resistance as well. Eventually, the Interstate planners won out, and the city's historic Jefferson Square was demolished, as well as dozens of homes along the route.

In 1999, a bill was introduced in the US House of Representatives that would have extended I-480 south along US 75 in southern Omaha and in Bellevue, Nebraska, then east through Plattsmouth to connect with I-29 near Glenwood, Iowa, which would have increased the length of I-480 to 19 miles (31 km). However, this bill was tabled in the committee.

In 2004, the Nebraska Department of Roads (now the Nebraska Department of Transportation [NDOT]) began a project to reconstruct the I-480/US 75 interchange. Work took place in three phases spread out over the course of six years. The final phase of the $52-million project was funded with $13 million ($71.3 million and $17.8 million in 2024, respectively) in American Recovery and Reinvestment Act of 2009 stimulus money. The project was completed in May 2011 just in time for the College World Series.

In March 2021, the Iowa DOT began a project to improve the I-29/I-480/West Broadway System Interchange at I-480's eastern terminus. The project was done to improve traffic flow, safety, and the functional design at that interchange as well as at the adjacent I-29 interchanges at 41st Street, 35th Street, Avenue G and 9th Avenue. The project is projected to be completed by the end of 2024.

== Exit list ==
State	County	Location	mi	km	Exit	Destinations	Notes
Nebraska	Douglas	Omaha	0.00	0.00	452C	US 75 south (Kennedy Freeway) / I-80 – Offutt AFB, Lincoln, Des Moines	Counterclockwise terminus; southern end of US 75 overlap; exit 452C is for I-80 westbound; exit number based on I-80 mileage; I-80 exit 452; continues south as US 75 (Kennedy Freeway)
Nebraska	Douglas	Omaha	0.89	1.43	1A	Martha Street	Former N-38
Nebraska	Douglas	Omaha	1.81	2.91	1B	Leavenworth Street	Northbound exit and southbound entrance only
Nebraska	Douglas	Omaha	1.89	3.04	2A	Harney Street / Dodge Street (US 6 west)	No southbound exit
Nebraska	Douglas	Omaha	2.25	3.62	2B	30th Street / Dodge Street (US 6 west)	No northbound exit
Nebraska	Douglas	Omaha	2.54	4.09	2C	US 75 north (North Freeway) – Creighton University, Event Center–Ballpark, Eppley Airfield	Northern end of US 75 overlap; former I-580
Nebraska	Douglas	Omaha	3.20	5.15	2D	20th Street – Auditorium / Capitol Avenue	Eastbound exit only
Nebraska	Douglas	Omaha	3.20	5.15	2D	17th Street / Chicago Street	Westbound entrance only
Nebraska	Douglas	Omaha	3.52	5.66	3	14th Street – Event Center–Ballpark, Old Market District, Creighton University	No westbound entrance
Nebraska	Douglas	Omaha	3.52	5.66	3	13th Street	Westbound entrance only
Nebraska	Douglas	Omaha	4.00	6.44	4	US 6 west (Dodge Street) – Event Center–Ballpark, Eppley Airfield	One-way street; western end of US 6 overlap; westbound exit only; former US 75 south
Nebraska	Douglas	Omaha	4.00	6.44	4	US 6 (Douglas Street)	One-way street; western end of US 6 overlap; eastbound entrance only; former US 75
Missouri River			4.23 0.000	6.81 0.000	Grenville Dodge Memorial Bridge		
Iowa	Pottawattamie	Council Bluffs	0.274	0.441	0	W. Broadway – Riverfront	Eastbound exit and westbound entrance; former US 6 east
Iowa	Pottawattamie	Council Bluffs	0.721	1.160	—	I-29 north – Sioux City	Eastbound exit and westbound entrance; I-29 exit 53
Iowa	Pottawattamie	Council Bluffs	0.721	1.160	—	9th Avenue / Harrah's Boulevard	Eastbound exit and westbound entrance
Iowa	Pottawattamie	Council Bluffs	0.721	1.160		I-29 south / US 6 east – Kansas City	Clockwise terminus; eastern end of US 6 overlap; I-29 exit 53B
1.000 mi = 1.609 km; 1.000 km = 0.621 mi: Concurrency terminus; Incomplete access
