= List of state spur highways in Nebraska =

- Standard state spur shields

Highway names
- State spur: State Spur XXX (Spur XXX)

System links
- Nebraska State Highway System; Interstate; US; State; Link; Spur; State Spurs; Recreation

Per state law in Nebraska, all communities with a population above 1000 residents are to be connected to the state highway system. Prior to the 1970s, short spur routes that were offshoots of main highways were given route numbers based on the main highway. The spurs were numbered sequentially from west to east or north to south and prefixed to the main route's number. For instance, the spur from U.S. Highway 6 (US 6) into Champion was numbered Spur 106 and the spur from US 183 into Huntley was Spur 2183.

In 1970, the Nebraska Department of Roads gave all of the state spurs new route numbers. The change was initiated to create a system of secondary highways that was expandable and followed a pattern. The new route numbers were given a letter prefix of S, L, or R, for Spur, Link, or Recreation Road, respectively, a number which identified the county in alphabetical order, and a letter suffix identified each particular route. For instance, Spur 208 into Liberty was renumbered S-34A and Spur 715 into Western was renumbered S-76C.

== List of routes ==
Number	Length (mi)	Length (km)	Southern or western terminus	Northern or eastern terminus	Formed	Removed	Notes
Spur 104	—	—	—	—	1957	1970	Became S-91A
Spur 106	—	—	—	—	1957	1970	Became S-15A
Spur 109	—	—	—	—	1957	1970	Became S-87A
Spur 115	—	—	—	—	1957	1970	Became S-12A
Spur 126	—	—	—	—	1957	1970	Became S-79A
Spur 129	—	—	—	—	1950	1970	Became S-4A
Spur 134	—	—	—	—	1957	1970	Became S-1D
Spur 150	—	—	—	—	1957	1970	Became S-13A
Spur 151	—	—	—	—	1957	1970	Became L-20A
Spur 165	—	—	—	—	1957	1970	Became S-67C
Spur 174	—	—	—	—	1957	1970	Became S-18E
Spur 177	—	—	—	—	1957	1970	Became S-87B
Spur 181	—	—	—	—	1957	1970	Became S-71B
Spur 187	—	—	—	—	1957	1970	Became S-6A
Spur 192	—	—	—	—	1957	1970	Became S-61A
Spur 202	—	—	—	—	1957	1970	Became S-86B
Spur 203	—	—	—	—	1957	1960	Renumbered 2136
Spur 203S	—	—	—	—	1957	1960	Renumbered 208
Spur 204	—	—	—	—	1957	1970	Became S-65A
Spur 206	—	—	—	—	1957	1970	Became S-1A
Spur 208	—	—	—	—	1960	1970	Became S-34A
Spur 210	—	—	—	—	1957	1970	Became S-31A
Spur 214	—	—	—	—	1957	1970	Became S-16B
Spur 215	—	—	—	—	1957	1970	Became S-12A
Spur 226	—	—	—	—	1957	1970	Became L-79D
Spur 230	—	—	—	—	1957	1970	Became S-17A
Spur 234	—	—	—	—	1957	1970	Became S-13B
Spur 241	—	—	—	—	1957	1970	Became S-76D
Spur 259	—	—	—	—	1957	1970	Became S-54E
Spur 274	—	—	—	—	1957	1970	Became S-18F
Spur 277	—	—	—	—	1957	1970	Became S-55F
Spur 292	—	—	—	—	1957	1970	Became S-12E
Spur 302	—	—	—	—	1957	1970	Became S-21A
Spur 304	—	—	—	—	1957	1970	Became N-105
Spur 306	—	—	—	—	1957	1970	Became S-1B
Spur 310	—	—	—	—	1957	1970	Became S-31B
Spur 314	—	—	—	—	1957	1970	Became S-18C
Spur 315	—	—	—	—	1957	1970	Became S-12C
Spur 320	—	—	—	—	1957	1970	Became S-45A
Spur 330	—	—	—	—	1957	1970	Former N-106, became S-56A
Spur 334	—	—	—	—	1957	1970	Became S-55C
Spur 341	—	—	—	—	1957	1970	Became S-34B
Spur 350	—	—	—	—	1957	1970	Became S-66C
Spur 377	—	—	—	—	1957	1970	Became S-55F
Spur 392	—	—	—	—	1957	1970	Became S-12F
Spur 402	—	—	—	—	1957	1970	Became N-2 and S-41A
Spur 406	—	—	—	—	1957	1970	Became S-1C
Spur 410	—	—	—	—	1957	1970	Former routing of N-10; became L-50A
Spur 415	—	—	—	—	1957	1970	Became S-80A
Spur 420	—	—	—	—	1957	1970	Became L-45B
Spur 430	—	—	—	—	1957	1970	One portion became S-40A and remainder became an unmarked road
Spur 434	—	—	—	—	1964	1970	Became L-55L
Spur 441	—	—	—	—	1957	1970	
Spur 450	—	—	—	—	1957	1970	
Spur 477	—	—	—	—	1957	1970	Became S-55G
Spur 483	—	—	—	—	1957	1970	Former routing of US 183 (later US 83); one portion became S-16B and remainder became an unmarked road
Spur 492	—	—	—	—	1957	1970	Became S-78D
Spur 502	—	—	—	—	1957	1970	Became S-41B
Spur 506	—	—	—	—	1957	1970	Became S-18A
Spur 515	—	—	—	—	1957	1970	Became S-80C
Spur 520	—	—	—	—	1957	1970	Became S-2B
Spur 534	—	—	—	—	1957	1970	Became S-13B (now N-63)
Spur 550	—	—	—	—	1957	1970	Became S-67B
Spur 577	—	—	—	—	1957	1970	Became S-55H
Spur 583	—	—	—	—	1957	1970	Became S-57A
Spur 592	—	—	—	—	1957	1970	Became S-78E
Spur 602	—	—	—	—	1957	1970	Became S-93A
Spur 606	—	—	—	—	1957	1970	Became S-76A
Spur 615	—	—	—	—	1957	1970	
Spur 620	—	—	—	—	1957	1970	Became S-26A
Spur 677	—	—	—	—	1957	1970	
Spur 702	—	—	—	—	1957	1970	Became S-80D
Spur 706	—	—	—	—	1957	1970	Became S-80A
Spur 715	—	—	—	—	1957	1970	
Spur 802	—	—	—	—	1957	1970	Became S-66A
Spur 806	—	—	—	—	1957	1970	Became S-55A
Spur 1116	—	—	—	—	1957	1970	Became S-26B
Spur 1127	—	—	—	—	1957	1964	Became an unmarked road
Spur 1183	—	—	—	—	1957	1970	Former N-106, became S-21C
Spur 1275	—	—	—	—	1957	1970	Became S-59A
Spur 1281	—	—	—	—	1957	1970	Became S-91B
Spur 2136	—	—	—	—	1960	1970	Became S-31C
Spur 2183	—	—	—	—	1957	1970	Became S-42A
Former
