= Nebraska Highway 25 =

State highway in Nebraska, U.S.

State Highway 25
- Great Plains Indian Highway
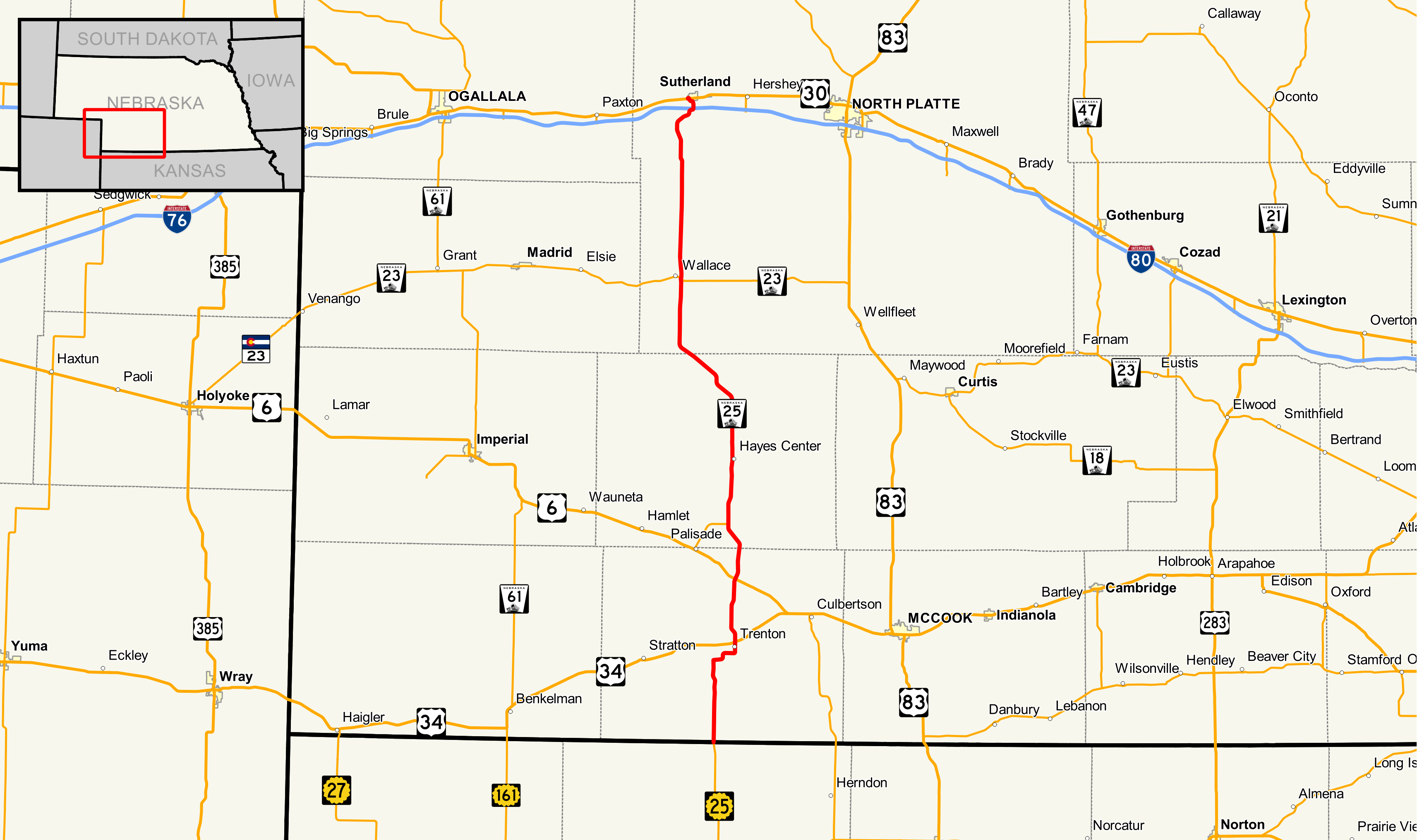
- Nebraska Highway 25 highlighted in red

Route information
- Maintained by NDOT
- Length: 87.56 mi (140.91 km)

Major junctions
- South end: K-25 south of Trenton
- US 34 in Trenton; US 6 north of Trenton; N-23 east of Wallace; I-80 south of Sutherland
- North end: US 30 in Sutherland

Location
- Country: United States
- State: Nebraska
- Counties: Hitchcock, Hayes, Lincoln

Highway system
- Nebraska State Highway System; Interstate; US; State; Link; Spur; State Spurs; Recreation
← N-24	→ US 26

Nebraska Highway 25 is a highway in southwestern Nebraska. It runs for 87 miles (140 km). Its southern terminus is at the Kansas border south of Trenton. Its northern terminus is at U.S. Highway 30 in Sutherland.

A previous routing of the highway is now Nebraska Highway 25A, which serves as a spur to Palisade.

== Route description ==
Nebraska Highway 25 begins at the Kansas border and serves as a continuation of K-25. It goes north into farmland and near the Swanson Reservoir before it turns northeast to go into Trenton. In Trenton, NE 25 meets U.S. Highway 34. It continues north for 8 miles (13 km), where it meets U.S. Highway 6. It proceeds north through Hayes Center, then goes northwesterly to the border of Hayes County and Lincoln County. The highway then turns due north and meets Nebraska Highway 23 near Wallace. It continues north, meets Interstate 80 shortly before entering Sutherland, and ends in Sutherland at an intersection with U.S. Highway 30.

== Major intersections ==
County	Location	mi	km	Destinations	Notes
Hitchcock	Upper Driftwood Precinct	0.00	0.00	K-25 south – Atwood	Continuation into Kansas
Hitchcock	Trenton Precinct	10.22	16.45	R-44B – Swanson Lake Recreation Area	
Hitchcock	Trenton	14.78	23.79	US 34 – Benkelman, McCook	
Hitchcock	Beverly Precinct	22.80	36.69	US 6 – Imperial, Culbertson, McCook	
Hayes	Hopewell Precinct	30.14	48.51	N-25A south – Palisade	Former N-25 south
Lincoln	Wallace Precinct	63.60	102.35	N-23 – Wallace, Holdrege, Curtis, Grant	
Lincoln	Sutherland Precinct	85.81– 85.83	138.10– 138.13	I-80 – North Platte, Sidney	I-80 exit 158
Lincoln	Sutherland Precinct	87.56	140.91	US 30 (Lincoln Highway) – Sutherland, North Platte, Ogallala	Northern terminus
1.000 mi = 1.609 km; 1.000 km = 0.621 mi

== Highway 25A ==
State Highway 25A
- Location: Palisade
- Length: 6.03 mi (9.70 km)

Nebraska Highway 25A has a southern terminus in Palisade at U.S. Highway 6 and a northern terminus at Highway 25 northeast of Palisade. The highway functions as a spur route into Palisade from N-25. The highway also previously served as an alignment of N-25 prior to 1961. N-25A is 6.03 miles (9.70 km) long.

=== Junction list ===
County	Location	mi	km	Destinations	Notes
Hitchcock	Palisade	0.00	0.00	US 6 – Culbertson, Imperial	Southern terminus; road continues as Road 359
Hayes	Hopewell Precinct	6.03	9.70	N-25 – Hayes Center, Atwood KS	Northern terminus
1.000 mi = 1.609 km; 1.000 km = 0.621 mi
