= Trenton Dam =

- Location within Nebraska Location within the United States
- Country: United States
- Location: Hitchcock County, Nebraska
- Coordinates: 40°09′46″N 101°03′48″W
- Status: Operational
- Opening date: 1953

Dam and spillways
- Height: 144 ft (44 m)
- Length: 8,600 ft (2,600 m)

Reservoir
- Creates: Swanson Lake
- Total capacity: 246,291 acre⋅ft (303,795,000 m^{3})
- Surface area: 4,974 acres (2,013 ha)
- Normal elevation: 2,753 ft (839 m)

Hitchcock County in Nebraska, with the city of Trenton in red

Trenton Dam is a dam on the Republican River in Nebraska, standing in Hitchcock County in the southwestern part of the state. The facility stands about 2 and one-half miles west of Trenton, Nebraska.

The dam is a project of the United States Bureau of Reclamation and was built between 1949 and 1953 for irrigation water storage and flood control. At 144 feet (44 m) high, the dam's length is 8,600 feet (2,600 m) at its crest.

Lake Swanson is the reservoir formed by the dam, with a capacity of 246,291 acre-feet (303,795,000 m^{3}). It is popular for recreational fishing, boating, camping, hunting and hiking, with 4,974 acres (2,013 ha) of water surface, 5,253 acres (2,126 ha) of land, and about 30 miles (48 km) of shoreline.
