= Hamlet, Nebraska =

Village in Nebraska, United States

- Village
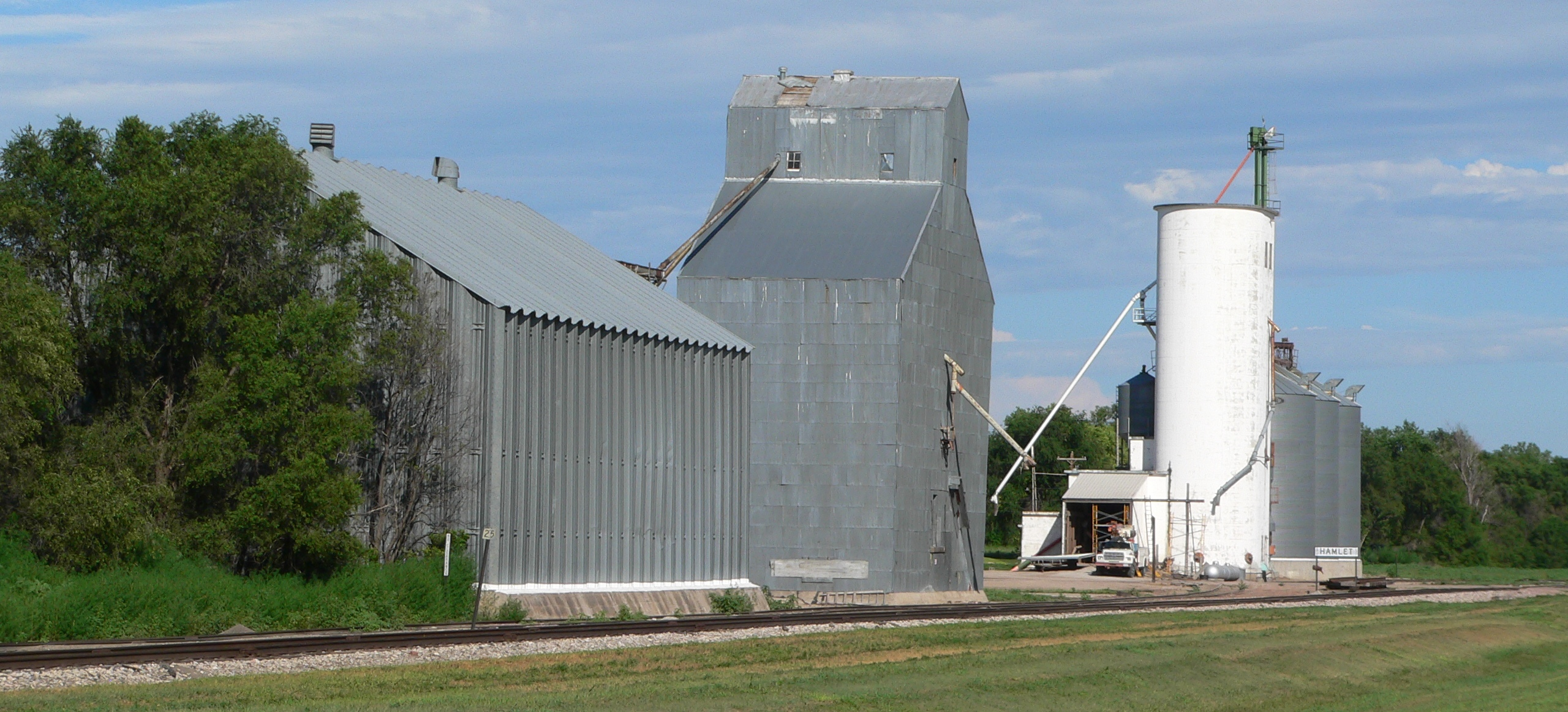
- Grain elevators at southern edge of Hamlet

- Location of Hamlet, Nebraska
- Coordinates: 40°23′04″N 101°14′04″W
- Country: United States
- State: Nebraska
- County: Hayes

Area
  - Total: 0.31 sq mi (0.81 km^{2})
  - Land: 0.31 sq mi (0.81 km^{2})
  - Water: 0 sq mi (0.00 km^{2})
- Elevation: 2,835 ft (864 m)

Population (2020)
  - Total: 27
  - Density: 86.8/sq mi (33.53/km^{2})
- Time zone: UTC-6 (Central (CST))
  - Summer (DST): UTC-5 (CDT)
- ZIP code: 69040
- Area code: 308
- FIPS code: 31-20750
- GNIS feature ID: 2398232

Hamlet is a village in Hayes County, Nebraska, United States. The population was 27 at the 2020 census.

== History ==
Hamlet was originally called Hudson, and under the latter name a post office was established in 1890. In order to avoid repetition with another Hudson in the state, the town was renamed Hamlet in 1904 as it constituted a rural hamlet.

== Geography ==
According to the United States Census Bureau, the village has a total area of 0.31 square miles (0.80 km^{2}), all land.

== Demographics ==
Historical population
Census	Pop.	Note	%±
1930	199		—
1940	220		10.6%
1950	154		−30.0%
1960	113		−26.6%
1970	64		−43.4%
1980	74		15.6%
1990	60		−18.9%
2000	54		−10.0%
2010	57		5.6%
2020	27		−52.6%
U.S. Decennial Census

=== 2010 census ===
As of the census of 2010, there were 57 people, 28 households, and 18 families residing in the village. The population density was 183.9 inhabitants per square mile (71.0/km^{2}). There were 35 housing units at an average density of 112.9 per square mile (43.6/km^{2}). The racial makeup of the village was 94.7% White, 3.5% Asian, and 1.8% from other races. Hispanic or Latino of any race were 1.8% of the population.

There were 28 households, of which 10.7% had children under the age of 18 living with them, 64.3% were married couples living together, and 35.7% were non-families. 32.1% of all households were made up of individuals, and 7.1% had someone living alone who was 65 years of age or older. The average household size was 2.04 and the average family size was 2.56.

The median age in the village was 54.6 years. 10.5% of residents were under the age of 18; 3.6% were between the ages of 18 and 24; 7.1% were from 25 to 44; 49.2% were from 45 to 64; and 29.8% were 65 years of age or older. The gender makeup of the village was 59.6% male and 40.4% female.

=== 2000 census ===
As of the census of 2000, there were 54 people, 27 households, and 14 families residing in the village. The population density was 163.5 inhabitants per square mile (63.1/km^{2}). There were 35 housing units at an average density of 106.0 per square mile (40.9/km^{2}). The racial makeup of the village was 98.15% White, 1.85% from other races. Hispanic or Latino of any race were 1.85% of the population.

There were 27 households, out of which 14.8% had children under the age of 18 living with them, 51.9% were married couples living together, and 48.1% were non-families. 48.1% of all households were made up of individuals, and 22.2% had someone living alone who was 65 years of age or older. The average household size was 2.00 and the average family size was 2.93.

In the village, the population was spread out, with 24.1% under the age of 18, 25.9% from 25 to 44, 25.9% from 45 to 64, and 24.1% who were 65 years of age or older. The median age was 46 years. For every 100 females, there were 92.9 males. For every 100 females age 18 and over, there were 86.4 males.

As of 2000 the median income for a household in the village was $16,667, and the median income for a family was $43,438. Males had a median income of $16,250 versus $16,250 for females. The per capita income for the village was $12,704. There were no families and 8.3% of the population living below the poverty line, including no under eighteens and none of those over 64.

== See also ==
- List of municipalities in Nebraska
