= Palisade, Nebraska =

Village in Hitchcock and Hayes counties in Nebraska, United States

- Village
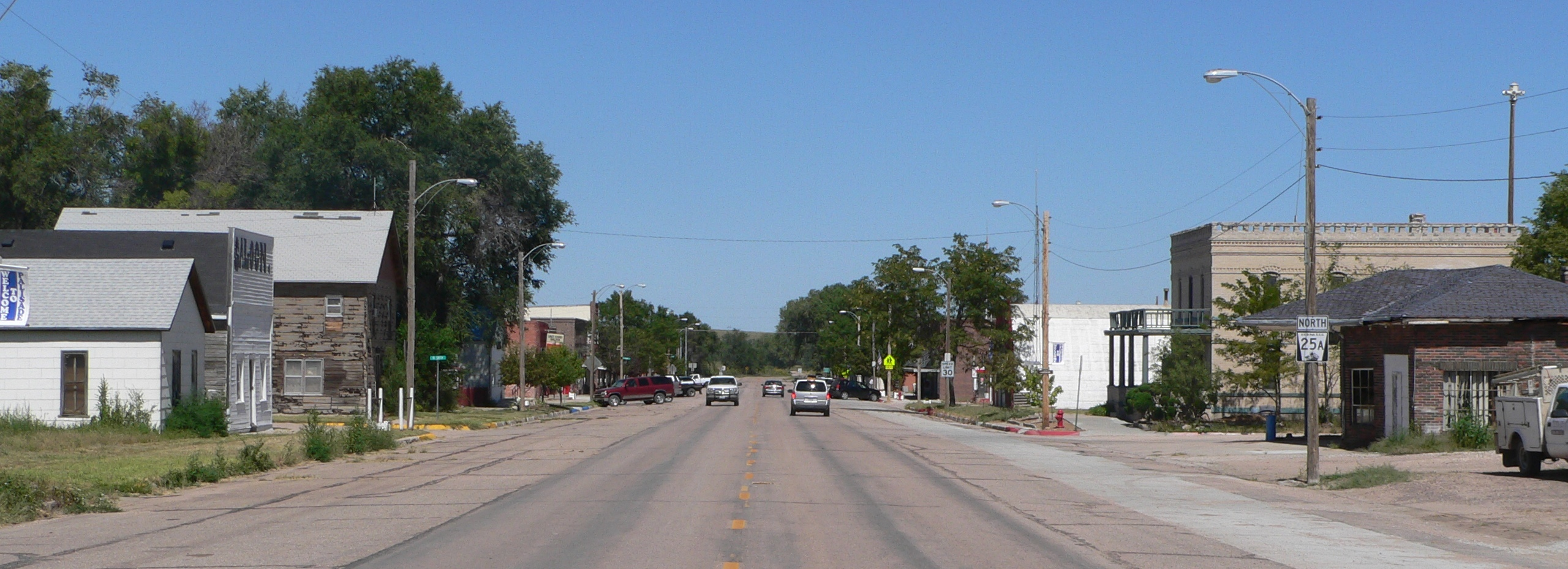
- Downtown Palisade: looking north on Main Street

- Location of Palisade, Nebraska
- Coordinates: 40°20′54″N 101°06′27″W
- Country: United States
- State: Nebraska
- Counties: Hitchcock, Hayes

Area
  - Total: 0.36 sq mi (0.92 km^{2})
  - Land: 0.36 sq mi (0.92 km^{2})
  - Water: 0 sq mi (0.00 km^{2})
- Elevation: 2,763 ft (842 m)

Population (2020)
  - Total: 294
  - Density: 828.1/sq mi (319.74/km^{2})
- Time zone: UTC-6 (Central (CST))
  - Summer (DST): UTC-5 (CDT)
- ZIP code: 69040
- Area code: 308
- FIPS code: 31-38130
- GNIS feature ID: 2399611
- Website: villageofpalisade.gov

Palisade is a village in Hayes and Hitchcock counties in the U.S. state of Nebraska. The population was 294 at the 2020 census.

== History ==
Palisade was established at its current site in 1882, when the railroad was extended to that point. It was named from the terrain around the town, which was thought to resemble a palisade.

== Geography ==
Most of the village is located in Hitchcock County; only a small portion extends into Hayes County.

According to the United States Census Bureau, the village has a total area of 0.36 square miles (0.93 km^{2}), all land.

== Demographics ==
Historical population
Census	Pop.	Note	%±
1890	126		—
1900	176		39.7%
1910	380		115.9%
1920	527		38.7%
1930	731		38.7%
1940	799		9.3%
1950	694		−13.1%
1960	544		−21.6%
1970	372		−31.6%
1980	401		7.8%
1990	381		−5.0%
2000	386		1.3%
2010	351		−9.1%
2020	294		−16.2%
U.S. Decennial Census

=== 2010 census ===
As of the census of 2010, there were 351 people, 162 households, and 97 families residing in the village. The population density was 975.0 inhabitants per square mile (376.4/km^{2}). There were 195 housing units at an average density of 541.7 per square mile (209.2/km^{2}). The racial makeup of the village was 98.9% White and 1.1% Native American.

There were 162 households, of which 22.8% had children under the age of 18 living with them, 50.6% were married couples living together, 8.0% had a female householder with no husband present, 1.2% had a male householder with no wife present, and 40.1% were non-families. 37.7% of all households were made up of individuals, and 17.9% had someone living alone who was 65 years of age or older. The average household size was 2.17 and the average family size was 2.87.

The median age in the village was 47.3 years. 21.7% of residents were under the age of 18; 6.8% were between the ages of 18 and 24; 18.5% were from 25 to 44; 28.8% were from 45 to 64; and 24.2% were 65 years of age or older. The gender makeup of the village was 50.1% male and 49.9% female.

=== 2000 census ===
As of the census of 2000, there were 386 people, 162 households, and 109 families residing in the village. The population density was 1,081.7 inhabitants per square mile (417.6/km^{2}). There were 188 housing units at an average density of 526.8 per square mile (203.4/km^{2}). The racial makeup of the village was 96.63% White, 0.26% African American, 0.52% Native American, and 2.59% from two or more races. Hispanic or Latino of any race were 0.78% of the population.

There were 162 households, out of which 26.5% had children under the age of 18 living with them, 56.2% were married couples living together, 9.9% had a female householder with no husband present, and 32.7% were non-families. 30.2% of all households were made up of individuals, and 21.0% had someone living alone who was 65 years of age or older. The average household size was 2.38 and the average family size was 2.98.

In the village, the population was spread out, with 27.7% under the age of 18, 6.0% from 18 to 24, 23.1% from 25 to 44, 20.5% from 45 to 64, and 22.8% who were 65 years of age or older. The median age was 40 years. For every 100 females, there were 87.4 males. For every 100 females age 18 and over, there were 82.4 males.

The median income for a household in the village was $25,417, and the median income for a family was $31,635. Males had a median income of $21,875 versus $18,750 for females. The per capita income for the village was $13,106. About 12.9% of families and 20.8% of the population were below the poverty line, including 38.0% of those under age 18 and 9.5% of those age 65 or over.

== Events ==
Every year in June, Palisade stages a weekend-long "Palisade Pioneer Days" celebration. The emphasis is on Palisade High School alumni; the event includes games, meals, and a parade.

== Notable person ==
- Ralph Arthur Bohlmann, seminary president.

== See also ==
- List of municipalities in Nebraska
