= Trenton, Nebraska =

Village in Hitchcock County, Nebraska, United States

- Village
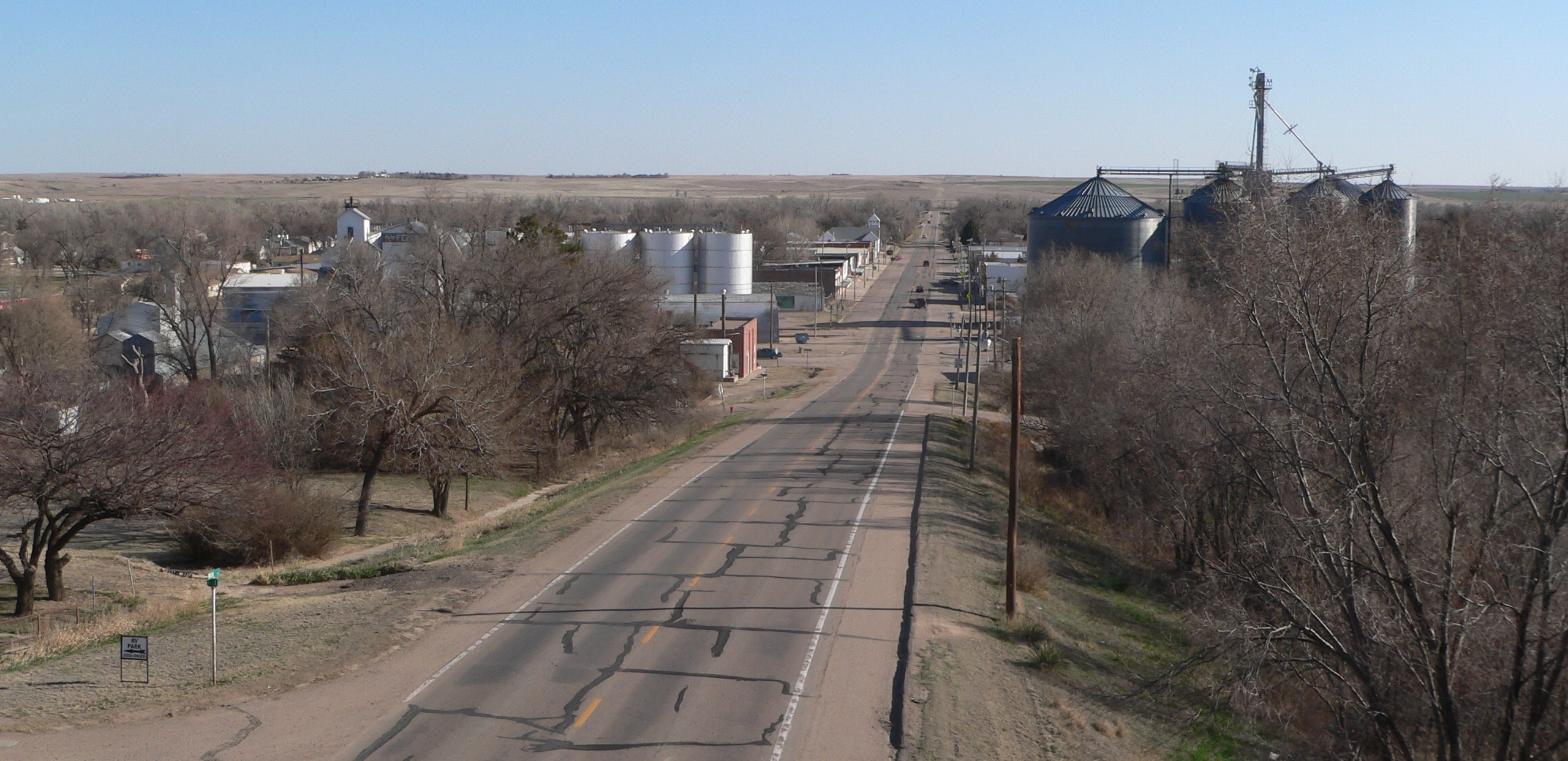
- Trenton in 2013 (looking south)

- Location of Trenton, Nebraska
- Coordinates: 40°10′29″N 101°0′49″W
- Country: United States
- State: Nebraska
- County: Hitchcock

Area
  - Total: 0.58 sq mi (1.51 km^{2})
  - Land: 0.58 sq mi (1.51 km^{2})
  - Water: 0 sq mi (0.00 km^{2})
- Elevation: 2,674 ft (815 m)

Population (2020)
  - Total: 516
  - Density: 886.0/sq mi (342.09/km^{2})
- Time zone: UTC-6 (Central (CST))
  - Summer (DST): UTC-5 (CDT)
- ZIP code: 69044
- Area code: 308
- FIPS code: 31-49145
- GNIS feature ID: 2400002
- Website: villageoftrenton.net

Trenton is a village in Hitchcock County, Nebraska, United States. The population was 516 at the 2020 census. It is the county seat of Hitchcock County.

== History ==
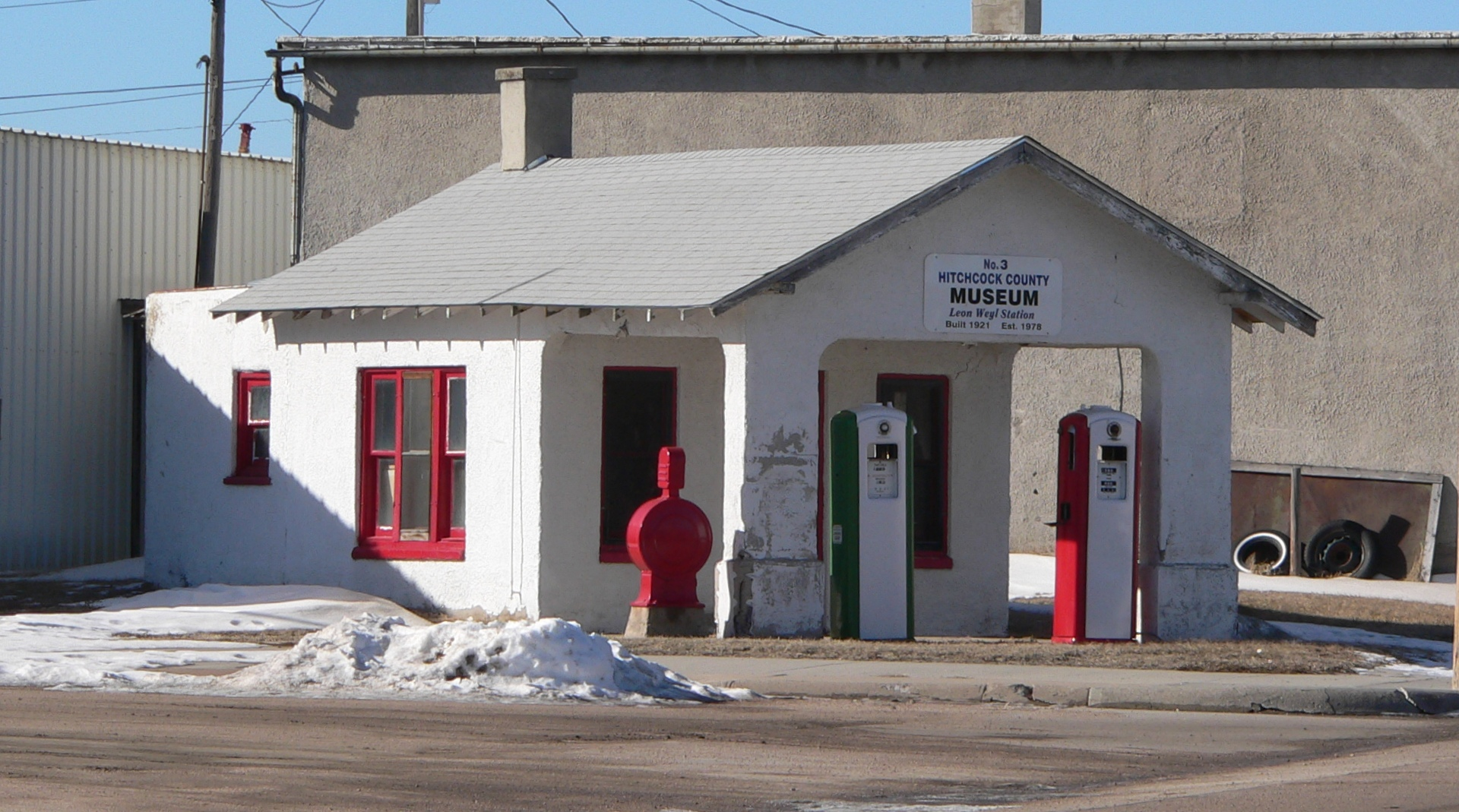
Weyl Service Station in Trenton. Built in 1921, it is now part of the Hitchcock County Museum. It is listed in the National Register of Historic Places.

Trenton was platted in 1885 when the railroad was extended to that point. It was named after Trenton, New Jersey. Due to Trenton's location near the center of the county, and its position on the Chicago, Burlington and Quincy Railroad, the seat of Hitchcock County was transferred there from the first county seat, Culbertson.

== Geography ==
According to the United States Census Bureau, the village has a total area of 0.58 square miles (1.50 km^{2}), all land.

Trenton Dam, impounding the Republican River, and its state park, Swanson Reservoir, stand about two and one-half miles west of the city.

=== Climate ===
Climate data for Trenton Dam 1N, Nebraska (1991–2020 normals, extremes 1949–present)
Month	Jan	Feb	Mar	Apr	May	Jun	Jul	Aug	Sep	Oct	Nov	Dec	Year
Record high °F (°C)	78 (26)	82 (28)	93 (34)	101 (38)	103 (39)	111 (44)	111 (44)	111 (44)	106 (41)	97 (36)	86 (30)	79 (26)	111 (44)
Mean daily maximum °F (°C)	41.5 (5.3)	45.0 (7.2)	55.9 (13.3)	64.3 (17.9)	73.6 (23.1)	85.3 (29.6)	90.9 (32.7)	88.6 (31.4)	81.1 (27.3)	67.6 (19.8)	53.5 (11.9)	42.8 (6.0)	65.8 (18.8)
Daily mean °F (°C)	28.3 (−2.1)	31.3 (−0.4)	41.2 (5.1)	50.2 (10.1)	60.3 (15.7)	71.6 (22.0)	77.1 (25.1)	75.1 (23.9)	66.4 (19.1)	52.6 (11.4)	39.4 (4.1)	29.7 (−1.3)	51.9 (11.1)
Mean daily minimum °F (°C)	15.1 (−9.4)	17.6 (−8.0)	26.5 (−3.1)	36.1 (2.3)	47.0 (8.3)	58.0 (14.4)	63.3 (17.4)	61.6 (16.4)	51.8 (11.0)	37.7 (3.2)	25.4 (−3.7)	16.7 (−8.5)	38.1 (3.4)
Record low °F (°C)	−24 (−31)	−24 (−31)	−25 (−32)	9 (−13)	23 (−5)	34 (1)	42 (6)	42 (6)	25 (−4)	2 (−17)	−16 (−27)	−31 (−35)	−31 (−35)
Average precipitation inches (mm)	0.36 (9.1)	0.48 (12)	0.94 (24)	2.23 (57)	2.89 (73)	3.04 (77)	3.29 (84)	2.91 (74)	1.44 (37)	1.55 (39)	0.70 (18)	0.46 (12)	20.29 (515)
Average snowfall inches (cm)	3.6 (9.1)	4.3 (11)	3.7 (9.4)	2.0 (5.1)	0.1 (0.25)	0.0 (0.0)	0.0 (0.0)	0.0 (0.0)	0.0 (0.0)	1.5 (3.8)	2.8 (7.1)	3.8 (9.7)	21.8 (55)
Average precipitation days (≥ 0.01 in)	2.1	3.0	4.2	7.6	9.8	9.4	8.9	7.7	5.5	5.5	3.1	2.5	69.3
Average snowy days (≥ 0.1 in)	1.7	2.3	1.7	1.0	0.0	0.0	0.0	0.0	0.0	0.5	1.1	1.9	10.2
Source: NOAA

== Demographics ==
Historical population
Census	Pop.	Note	%±
1890	267		—
1900	329		23.2%
1910	497		51.1%
1920	592		19.1%
1930	865		46.1%
1940	920		6.4%
1950	1,239		34.7%
1960	914		−26.2%
1970	770		−15.8%
1980	796		3.4%
1990	656		−17.6%
2000	507		−22.7%
2010	560		10.5%
2020	516		−7.9%
U.S. Decennial Census

=== 2010 census ===
As of the census of 2010, there were 560 people, 264 households, and 134 families residing in the village. The population density was 965.5 inhabitants per square mile (372.8/km^{2}). There were 328 housing units at an average density of 565.5 per square mile (218.3/km^{2}). The racial makeup of the village was 98.4% White, 0.4% African American, 0.5% Native American, 0.4% from other races, and 0.4% from two or more races. Hispanic or Latino of any race were 1.6% of the population.

There were 264 households, of which 22.7% had children under the age of 18 living with them, 37.5% were married couples living together, 10.6% had a female householder with no husband present, 2.7% had a male householder with no wife present, and 49.2% were non-families. 43.9% of all households were made up of individuals, and 20.8% had someone living alone who was 65 years of age or older. The average household size was 2.02 and the average family size was 2.77.

The median age in the village was 48.1 years. 18.6% of residents were under the age of 18; 6.9% were between the ages of 18 and 24; 20.1% were from 25 to 44; 26.8% were from 45 to 64; and 27.7% were 65 years of age or older. The gender makeup of the village was 49.1% male and 50.9% female.

=== 2000 census ===
As of the census of 2000, there were 507 people, 246 households, and 138 families residing in the village. The population density was 878.7 inhabitants per square mile (339.3/km^{2}). There were 301 housing units at an average density of 521.7 per square mile (201.4/km^{2}). The racial makeup of the village was 98.62% White, 0.20% Asian, 0.59% from other races, and 0.59% from two or more races. Hispanic or Latino of any race were 1.18% of the population.

There were 246 households, out of which 19.5% had children under the age of 18 living with them, 46.3% were married couples living together, 6.9% had a female householder with no husband present, and 43.9% were non-families. 38.2% of all households were made up of individuals, and 18.7% had someone living alone who was 65 years of age or older. The average household size was 2.03 and the average family size was 2.70.

In the village, the population was spread out, with 17.8% under the age of 18, 6.9% from 18 to 24, 22.7% from 25 to 44, 27.8% from 45 to 64, and 24.9% who were 65 years of age or older. The median age was 47 years. For every 100 females, there were 92.8 males. For every 100 females age 18 and over, there were 87.8 males.

As of 2000 the median income for a household in the village was $25,078, and the median income for a family was $34,271. Males had a median income of $26,094 versus $20,625 for females. The per capita income for the village was $14,057. About 13.7% of families and 15.0% of the population were below the poverty line, including 12.8% of those under age 18 and 8.5% of those age 65 or over.

== Notable person ==
- Tom Baker, Nebraska state legislator.

== See also ==
- List of municipalities in Nebraska
- National Register of Historic Places listings in Hitchcock County, Nebraska
  - Massacre Canyon Battlefield
