= List of counties in Nebraska =

Counties of Nebraska
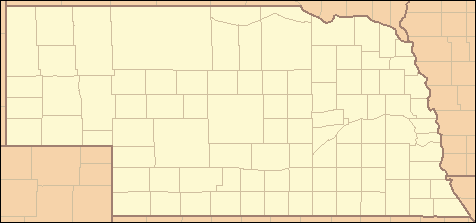
- Location: State of Nebraska
- Number: 93
- Populations: 369 (McPherson) – 606,460 (Douglas)
- Areas: 241 square miles (620 km^{2}) (Sarpy) – 5,961 square miles (15,440 km^{2}) (Cherry)
- Government: County government
- Subdivisions: Cities, towns, townships, unincorporated communities, Indian reservations, census-designated places

Nebraska has 93 counties. They are listed below by name, FIPS code and license plate prefix.

Nebraska's postal abbreviation is NE and its FIPS state code is 31.

When many counties were formed, the bills establishing them did not state the honoree's full name; thus the namesakes of several counties, including Brown, Deuel, Dixon, and possibly Harlan, are known only by their surnames.

== County list ==
County	FIPS code	County seat	Est.	Origin	Etymology	License plate prefix	Population	Area	Map
Adams County	001	Hastings	February 16, 1867	Unorganized territory	John Adams, second President of the United States	14	31,071	563 sq mi (1,458 km^{2})	State map highlighting Adams County
Antelope County	003	Neligh	March 1, 1871	Unorganized territory	Pronghorn, often called antelope	26	6,352	857 sq mi (2,220 km^{2})	State map highlighting Antelope County
Arthur County	005	Arthur	March 31, 1887	Formed from McPherson County	Chester A. Arthur, twenty-first president of the United States	91	396	715 sq mi (1,852 km^{2})	State map highlighting Arthur County
Banner County	007	Harrisburg	November 6, 1888	Formed from Cheyenne County	Early settlers' goal of making it the "banner county" of the state	85	686	746 sq mi (1,932 km^{2})	State map highlighting Banner County
Blaine County	009	Brewster	March 5, 1885	Unorganized territory	James G. Blaine, national politician	86	458	711 sq mi (1,841 km^{2})	State map highlighting Blaine County
Boone County	011	Albion	March 1, 1871	Unorganized territory	Daniel Boone, American pioneer and trapper	23	5,355	687 sq mi (1,779 km^{2})	State map highlighting Boone County
Box Butte County	013	Alliance	November 2, 1886	Formed from Dawes County	A box-shaped butte north of Alliance	65	10,494	1,075 sq mi (2,784 km^{2})	State map highlighting Box Butte County
Boyd County	015	Butte	August 1, 1891	Holt County and unorganized territory (Indian Territory)	James E. Boyd, the eighth governor of Nebraska	63	1,674	540 sq mi (1,399 km^{2})	State map highlighting Boyd County
Brown County	017	Ainsworth	February 19, 1883	Unorganized territory	The Brown family of early settlers	75	2,826	1,221 sq mi (3,162 km^{2})	State map highlighting Brown County
Buffalo County	019	Kearney	March 16, 1855	Unorganized territory	The American Bison	9	51,172	968 sq mi (2,507 km^{2})	State map highlighting Buffalo County
Burt County	021	Tekamah	November 23, 1854	One of nine original counties	Francis Burt, the first territorial governor	31	6,678	493 sq mi (1,277 km^{2})	State map highlighting Burt County
Butler County	023	David City	January 26, 1856	Formed from Greene County	William O. Butler, U.S. Congressman and military leader	25	8,507	584 sq mi (1,513 km^{2})	State map highlighting Butler County
Cass County	025	Plattsmouth	November 23, 1854	One of nine original counties	Lewis Cass, U.S. Senator who supported the Kansas-Nebraska Act	20	27,657	559 sq mi (1,448 km^{2})	State map highlighting Cass County
Cedar County	027	Hartington	February 12, 1857	Formed from Dixon and Pierce Counties	The eastern red cedar	13	8,373	740 sq mi (1,917 km^{2})	State map highlighting Cedar County
Chase County	029	Imperial	February 27, 1873	Unorganized territory	Champion S. Chase, Nebraska's first attorney general	72	3,718	894 sq mi (2,315 km^{2})	State map highlighting Chase County
Cherry County	031	Valentine	February 23, 1883	Unorganized territory	Samuel A. Cherry, army lieutenant killed in the Indian Wars	66	5,561	5,961 sq mi (15,439 km^{2})	State map highlighting Cherry County
Cheyenne County	033	Sidney	June 22, 1867	Unorganized territory	Named for the Cheyenne Indian tribe	39	9,528	1,196 sq mi (3,098 km^{2})	State map highlighting Cheyenne County
Clay County	035	Clay Center	February 16, 1867	Formed from unorganized territory	Henry Clay, national politician	30	6,170	573 sq mi (1,484 km^{2})	State map highlighting Clay County
Colfax County	037	Schuyler	February 15, 1869	Formed from Platte County	Schuyler Colfax, Vice President of the United States	43	10,934	413 sq mi (1,070 km^{2})	State map highlighting Colfax County
Cuming County	039	West Point	March 16, 1855	Formed from Burt County	Thomas B. Cuming, first territorial secretary	24	8,823	572 sq mi (1,481 km^{2})	State map highlighting Cuming County
Custer County	041	Broken Bow	February 17, 1877	Unorganized territory	George Armstrong Custer, U.S. Army general	4	10,500	2,576 sq mi (6,672 km^{2})	State map highlighting Custer County
Dakota County	043	Dakota City	March 16, 1855	Formed from Burt County	Dakota branch of the Sioux Indian tribe	70	21,687	264 sq mi (684 km^{2})	State map highlighting Dakota County
Dawes County	045	Chadron	February 19, 1885	Formed from Sioux County	James W. Dawes, the sixth governor of Nebraska	69	7,858	1,396 sq mi (3,616 km^{2})	State map highlighting Dawes County
Dawson County	047	Lexington	January 11, 1860	Unorganized territory	Jacob Dawson, first postmaster for Lincoln	18	24,452	1,013 sq mi (2,624 km^{2})	State map highlighting Dawson County
Deuel County	049	Chappell	November 6, 1888	Formed from Cheyenne County	The Deuel family of early settlers	78	1,862	440 sq mi (1,140 km^{2})	State map highlighting Deuel County
Dixon County	051	Ponca	January 26, 1856	Formed from Blackbird County, Izard County, and unorganized territory	The Dixon family of early settlers	35	5,602	476 sq mi (1,233 km^{2})	State map highlighting Dixon County
Dodge County	053	Fremont	November 23, 1854	One of nine original counties	Augustus Caesar Dodge, U.S. Senator who supported the Kansas-Nebraska Act	5	38,057	534 sq mi (1,383 km^{2})	State map highlighting Dodge County
Douglas County	055	Omaha	November 23, 1854	One of nine original counties	Stephen Arnold Douglas, national politician	1	606,460	331 sq mi (857 km^{2})	State map highlighting Douglas County
Dundy County	057	Benkelman	February 27, 1873	Unorganized territory	Elmer Scipio Dundy, U.S. Circuit Court judge	76	1,568	920 sq mi (2,383 km^{2})	State map highlighting Dundy County
Fillmore County	059	Geneva	January 26, 1856	Formed from Jackson County and unorganized territory	Millard Fillmore, thirteenth president of the United States	34	5,458	576 sq mi (1,492 km^{2})	State map highlighting Fillmore County
Franklin County	061	Franklin	February 16, 1867	Formed from Kearney County	Benjamin Franklin, Founding Father	50	2,795	576 sq mi (1,492 km^{2})	State map highlighting Franklin County
Frontier County	063	Stockville	January 17, 1872	Unorganized territory	Its location	60	2,655	975 sq mi (2,525 km^{2})	State map highlighting Frontier County
Furnas County	065	Beaver City	February 27, 1873	Unorganized territory	Robert Wilkinson Furnas, third governor of Nebraska	38	4,524	718 sq mi (1,860 km^{2})	State map highlighting Furnas County
Gage County	067	Beatrice	March 16, 1855	Unorganized territory	William D. Gage, contemporary chaplain of the state legislature	3	21,711	855 sq mi (2,214 km^{2})	State map highlighting Gage County
Garden County	069	Oshkosh	November 2, 1909	Formed from Deuel County	Early settlers' hopes for it to become the "garden spot of the west"	77	1,804	1,705 sq mi (4,416 km^{2})	State map highlighting Garden County
Garfield County	071	Burwell	October 4, 1884	Formed from Wheeler County	James Abram Garfield, twentieth president of the United States	83	1,710	570 sq mi (1,476 km^{2})	State map highlighting Garfield County
Gosper County	073	Elwood	August 29, 1873	Unorganized territory	John J. Gosper, contemporary Nebraska secretary of state	73	1,803	458 sq mi (1,186 km^{2})	State map highlighting Gosper County
Grant County	075	Hyannis	March 31, 1887	Unorganized territory	Ulysses S. Grant, eighteenth president of the United States	92	561	776 sq mi (2,010 km^{2})	State map highlighting Grant County
Greeley County	077	Greeley	March 1, 1871	Unorganized territory	Horace Greeley, journalist	62	2,154	570 sq mi (1,476 km^{2})	State map highlighting Greeley County
Hall County	079	Grand Island	November 4, 1858	Unorganized territory	Augustus Hall, contemporary chief justice of the Territorial Supreme Court	8	63,633	546 sq mi (1,414 km^{2})	State map highlighting Hall County
Hamilton County	081	Aurora	February 16, 1867	Unorganized territory	Alexander Hamilton, first United States Secretary of the Treasury	28	9,678	544 sq mi (1,409 km^{2})	State map highlighting Hamilton County
Harlan County	083	Alma	June 3, 1871	Formed from Kearney County	Disputed; either James Harlan, national politician, or a local revenue collector	51	3,000	553 sq mi (1,432 km^{2})	State map highlighting Harlan County
Hayes County	085	Hayes Center	February 19, 1877	Unorganized territory	Rutherford B. Hayes, nineteenth president of the United States	79	821	713 sq mi (1,847 km^{2})	State map highlighting Hayes County
Hitchcock County	087	Trenton	February 27, 1873	Unorganized territory	Phineas Warren Hitchcock, Nebraska U.S. Senator	67	2,467	710 sq mi (1,839 km^{2})	State map highlighting Hitchcock County
Holt County	089	O'Neill	January 9, 1862	Unorganized territory	Joseph Holt, U.S. Postmaster General and Secretary of War	36	10,067	2,413 sq mi (6,250 km^{2})	State map highlighting Holt County
Hooker County	091	Mullen	March 29, 1889	Unorganized territory	Joseph Hooker, U.S. Army general	93	686	721 sq mi (1,867 km^{2})	State map highlighting Hooker County
Howard County	093	Saint Paul	March 1, 1871	Formed from Hall County	Oliver O. Howard, U.S. Army general	49	6,538	570 sq mi (1,476 km^{2})	State map highlighting Howard County
Jefferson County	095	Fairbury	January 26, 1856	Unorganized territory	Thomas Jefferson, the third president of the United States	33	7,070	573 sq mi (1,484 km^{2})	State map highlighting Jefferson County
Johnson County	097	Tecumseh	February 10, 1857	Formed from Nemaha and Otoe Counties	Richard Mentor Johnson, ninth vice president of the United States	57	5,218	376 sq mi (974 km^{2})	State map highlighting Johnson County
Kearney County	099	Minden	January 10, 1860	Unorganized territory	Fort Kearny, with a misspelling	52	6,790	516 sq mi (1,336 km^{2})	State map highlighting Kearney County
Keith County	101	Ogallala	February 27, 1873	Unorganized territory	M.C. Keith, rancher with wide holdings	68	8,100	1,061 sq mi (2,748 km^{2})	State map highlighting Keith County
Keya Paha County	103	Springview	December 17, 1884	Formed from Brown County and unorganized Indian territory	Dakota words Ké-ya Pa-há Wa-kpá (turtle hill river)	82	792	773 sq mi (2,002 km^{2})	State map highlighting Keya Paha County
Kimball County	105	Kimball	November 6, 1888	Formed from Cheyenne County	Thomas L. Kimball, Union Pacific Railroad official	71	3,391	952 sq mi (2,466 km^{2})	State map highlighting Kimball County
Knox County	107	Center	February 10, 1857	Formed from Pierce County and unorganized territory (Former names-L'Eau Qui Court (1857-1867) and Emmet (1867-1873))	Henry Knox, first U.S. Secretary of War	12	8,335	1,108 sq mi (2,870 km^{2})	State map highlighting Knox County
Lancaster County	109	Lincoln	March 16, 1855	Formed from Cass and Pierce Counties	Lancaster, Pennsylvania and Lancaster, England	2	334,049	839 sq mi (2,173 km^{2})	State map highlighting Lancaster County
Lincoln County	111	North Platte	January 7, 1860	Unorganized territory	Abraham Lincoln, sixteenth president of the United States	15	33,303	2,564 sq mi (6,641 km^{2})	State map highlighting Lincoln County
Logan County	113	Stapleton	February 24, 1885	Unorganized territory	John A. Logan, U.S. Army general	87	669	571 sq mi (1,479 km^{2})	State map highlighting Logan County
Loup County	115	Taylor	February 23, 1883	Unorganized territory	Loup River	88	570	570 sq mi (1,476 km^{2})	State map highlighting Loup County
Madison County	119	Madison	January 26, 1856	Formed from Loup County, and McNeale County, and unorganized territory	Either James Madison, fourth president of the United States, or local settlers' native Madison, Wisconsin	7	36,106	573 sq mi (1,484 km^{2})	State map highlighting Madison County
McPherson County	117	Tryon	March 31, 1887	Formed from Logan County	James B. McPherson, U.S. Army general	90	369	859 sq mi (2,225 km^{2})	State map highlighting McPherson County
Merrick County	121	Central City	November 4, 1858	Formed from Polk County and unorganized territory	Elvira Merrick, wife of legislator Henry W. DePuy	46	7,905	485 sq mi (1,256 km^{2})	State map highlighting Merrick County
Morrill County	123	Bridgeport	November 3, 1908	Formed from Cheyenne County	Charles Henry Morrill, president of the Lincoln Land Company	64	4,404	1,424 sq mi (3,688 km^{2})	State map highlighting Morrill County
Nance County	125	Fullerton	June 1, 1879	Formed from a Pawnee Indian reservation	Albinus Nance, fourth governor of Nebraska	58	3,290	441 sq mi (1,142 km^{2})	State map highlighting Nance County
Nemaha County	127	Auburn	March 16, 1855	One of nine original counties	Nimaha, the Otoe name meaning miry water for a local stream	44	7,102	409 sq mi (1,059 km^{2})	State map highlighting Nemaha County
Nuckolls County	129	Nelson	January 13, 1860	Unorganized territory	Lafayette Nuckolls, a member of the first Nebraska territorial legislature; and his brother, Stephen Nuckolls, a pioneering Nebraska settler, businessman and banker	42	4,100	575 sq mi (1,489 km^{2})	State map highlighting Nuckolls County
Otoe County	131	Nebraska City	March 16, 1855	One of nine original counties	Oto (also Otoe) Native American tribe	11	16,531	616 sq mi (1,595 km^{2})	State map highlighting Otoe County
Pawnee County	133	Pawnee City	March 16, 1855	Formed from Richardson County	Pawnee Native American tribe	54	2,510	432 sq mi (1,119 km^{2})	State map highlighting Pawnee County
Perkins County	135	Grant	November 8, 1887	Formed from Keith County	Charles E. Perkins, a president of the Chicago, Burlington and Quincy Railroad	74	2,849	883 sq mi (2,287 km^{2})	State map highlighting Perkins County
Phelps County	137	Holdrege	February 11, 1873	Formed from Kearney County	William Phelps, an early settler	37	8,994	540 sq mi (1,399 km^{2})	State map highlighting Phelps County
Pierce County	139	Pierce	January 26, 1856	Formed from Izard County, McNeale County, and unorganized territory	Franklin Pierce, the fourteenth president of the United States	40	7,378	574 sq mi (1,487 km^{2})	State map highlighting Pierce County
Platte County	141	Columbus	January 26, 1856	Formed from Greene and Loup Counties	Platte River which is in turn named for the French word for flat	10	35,649	678 sq mi (1,756 km^{2})	State map highlighting Platte County
Polk County	143	Osceola	January 26, 1856	Formed from York County and unorganized territory	James Knox Polk, the eleventh president of the United States	41	5,270	439 sq mi (1,137 km^{2})	State map highlighting Polk County
Red Willow County	145	McCook	February 27, 1873	Unorganized territory	Red Willow Creek, which runs through the area	48	10,307	717 sq mi (1,857 km^{2})	State map highlighting Red Willow County
Richardson County	147	Falls City	November 23, 1854	One of nine original counties	William A. Richardson, a governor of the Nebraska Territory	19	7,530	554 sq mi (1,435 km^{2})	State map highlighting Richardson County
Rock County	149	Bassett	November 6, 1888	Formed from Brown County	Either Rock Creek, which flows in the county; or the rocky condition of the soil in the area	81	1,259	1,008 sq mi (2,611 km^{2})	State map highlighting Rock County
Saline County	151	Wilber	March 16, 1855	Unorganized territory	Named for a belief held by the early pioneers that great salt springs and deposits could be found in the area, a hope found to be false	22	14,996	575 sq mi (1,489 km^{2})	State map highlighting Saline County
Sarpy County	153	Papillion	February 7, 1857	Formed from Cass and Douglas Counties	Peter A. Sarpy, a commander of a trading post in the future county	59	208,303	241 sq mi (624 km^{2})	State map highlighting Sarpy County
Saunders County	155	Wahoo	January 26, 1856	Formed from Douglas and Lancaster Counties	Alvin Saunders, a governor of the Nebraska Territory	6	23,702	754 sq mi (1,953 km^{2})	State map highlighting Saunders County
Scotts Bluff County	157	Gering	November 6, 1888	Formed from Cheyenne County	Named for a towering bluff located in the Scotts Bluff National Monument; the bluffs themselves are named for Hiram Scott, a fur trapper who is alleged to have crawled 75 miles with a broken leg before collapsing and dying at the foot of the formation	21	35,586	739 sq mi (1,914 km^{2})	State map highlighting Scotts Bluff County
Seward County	159	Seward	March 16, 1855	Formed from Cass and Pierce Counties	William Henry Seward, the United States Secretary of State during the 1860s	16	18,032	575 sq mi (1,489 km^{2})	State map highlighting Seward County
Sheridan County	161	Rushville	February 25, 1885	Formed from Sioux County	Philip Henry Sheridan, a general in the American Civil War	61	4,809	2,441 sq mi (6,322 km^{2})	State map highlighting Sheridan County
Sherman County	163	Loup City	March 1, 1871	Formed from Buffalo County and unorganized territory	William Tecumseh Sherman, the American Civil War general	56	2,924	566 sq mi (1,466 km^{2})	State map highlighting Sherman County
Sioux County	165	Harrison	February 19, 1877	Unorganized territory	Sioux Native American tribe	80	1,188	1,313 sq mi (3,401 km^{2})	State map highlighting Sioux County
Stanton County	167	Stanton	March 16, 1855	Formed from Burt County	Edwin M. Stanton, the United States Secretary of War during most of the American Civil War	53	5,744	430 sq mi (1,114 km^{2})	State map highlighting Stanton County
Thayer County	169	Hebron	May 9, 1871	Formed from Jefferson County	John Milton Thayer, the seventh governor of Nebraska	32	4,842	575 sq mi (1,489 km^{2})	State map highlighting Thayer County
Thomas County	171	Thedford	March 31, 1887	Unorganized territory	George Henry Thomas, a general in the American Civil War	89	639	713 sq mi (1,847 km^{2})	State map highlighting Thomas County
Thurston County	173	Pender	March 28, 1889	Formed from Blackbird County and an Omaha Indian reservation	John Mellen Thurston, a U. S. senator from Nebraska	55	6,752	394 sq mi (1,020 km^{2})	State map highlighting Thurston County
Valley County	175	Ord	March 1, 1871	Unorganized territory	Named for the many valleys in the area	47	4,094	568 sq mi (1,471 km^{2})	State map highlighting Valley County
Washington County	177	Blair	November 23, 1854	One of nine original counties	George Washington, the first president of the United States	29	21,302	390 sq mi (1,010 km^{2})	State map highlighting Washington County
Wayne County	179	Wayne	March 4, 1871	Unorganized territory	Anthony Wayne, the American Revolutionary War general nicknamed "Mad Anthony" by his troops	27	10,020	444 sq mi (1,150 km^{2})	State map highlighting Wayne County
Webster County	181	Red Cloud	February 16, 1867	Unorganized territory	Daniel Webster, the statesman and U.S. Senator from Massachusetts	45	3,336	575 sq mi (1,489 km^{2})	State map highlighting Webster County
Wheeler County	183	Bartlett	February 17, 1877	Unorganized territory	Daniel H. Wheeler, a secretary of the Nebraska State Board of Agriculture	84	789	575 sq mi (1,489 km^{2})	State map highlighting Wheeler County
York County	185	York	March 16, 1855	Formed from Cass County, Pierce County, and unorganized territory	Named for either York, England, or York County, Pennsylvania	17	14,564	576 sq mi (1,492 km^{2})	State map highlighting York County

== Racial / Ethnic Profile of counties in Nebraska (2020 Census) ==
Racial / Ethnic Profile of counties in Nebraska (2020 Census)
Following is a table of counties in Nebraska by race/ethnicity. The majority racial/ethnic group is coded per the key below.

Majority minority with no dominant group
Majority White
Majority Black
Majority Hispanic
Majority Asian
Majority Native American

Racial and ethnic composition of counties in Nebraska (2020 Census) (NH = Non-Hispanic) Note: the US Census treats Hispanic/Latino as an ethnic category. This table excludes Latinos from the racial categories and assigns them to a separate category. Hispanics/Latinos may be of any race.
County	Location of County	Total Population	White alone (NH)	%	Black or African American alone (NH)	%	Native American or Alaska Native alone (NH)	%	Asian alone (NH)	%	Pacific Islander alone (NH)	%	Other race alone (NH)	%	Mixed race or Multiracial (NH)	%	Hispanic or Latino (any race)	%
Adams		31,205	25,779	82.61%	247	0.79%	119	0.38%	415	1.33%	9	0.03%	67	0.21%	910	2.92%	3,659	11.73%
Antelope		6,295	5,899	93.71%	22	0.35%	16	0.25%	22	0.35%	0	0.00%	3	0.05%	112	1.78%	221	3.51%
Arthur		434	400	92.17%	3	0.69%	0	0.00%	0	0.00%	0	0.00%	0	0.00%	19	4.38%	12	2.76%
Banner		674	600	89.02%	0	0.00%	5	0.74%	2	0.30%	0	0.00%	0	0.00%	16	2.37%	51	7.57%
Blaine		431	397	92.11%	1	0.23%	0	0.00%	1	0.23%	0	0.00%	0	0.00%	21	4.87%	11	2.55%
Boone		5,379	5,057	94.01%	21	0.39%	15	0.28%	7	0.13%	0	0.00%	6	0.11%	90	1.67%	183	3.40%
Box Butte		10,842	8,681	80.07%	66	0.61%	293	2.70%	71	0.65%	0	0.00%	17	0.16%	468	4.32%	1,246	11.49%
Boyd		1,810	1,723	95.19%	0	0.00%	11	0.61%	0	0.00%	0	0.00%	4	0.22%	39	2.15%	33	1.82%
Brown		2,903	2,629	90.56%	2	0.07%	7	0.24%	6	0.21%	0	0.00%	2	0.07%	81	2.79%	176	6.06%
Buffalo		50,084	42,108	84.07%	600	1.20%	149	0.30%	660	1.32%	33	0.07%	94	0.19%	1,378	2.75%	5,062	10.11%
Burt		6,722	6,197	92.19%	19	0.28%	72	1.07%	35	0.52%	17	0.25%	9	0.13%	201	2.99%	172	2.56%
Butler		8,369	7,626	91.12%	28	0.33%	22	0.26%	9	0.11%	1	0.01%	23	0.27%	178	2.13%	482	5.76%
Cass		26,598	24,261	91.21%	102	0.38%	87	0.33%	103	0.39%	8	0.03%	91	0.34%	958	3.60%	988	3.71%
Cedar		8,380	8,010	95.58%	25	0.30%	13	0.16%	9	0.11%	2	0.02%	3	0.04%	132	1.58%	186	2.22%
Chase		3,893	3,209	82.43%	20	0.51%	2	0.05%	11	0.28%	0	0.00%	2	0.05%	87	2.23%	562	14.44%
Cherry		5,455	4,772	87.48%	11	0.20%	271	4.97%	7	0.13%	0	0.00%	7	0.13%	239	4.38%	148	2.71%
Cheyenne		9,468	8,239	87.02%	51	0.54%	29	0.31%	75	0.79%	0	0.00%	39	0.41%	284	3.00%	751	7.93%
Clay		6,104	5,372	88.01%	8	0.13%	13	0.21%	10	0.16%	0	0.00%	14	0.23%	164	2.69%	523	8.57%
Colfax		10,582	5,018	47.42%	375	3.54%	26	0.25%	50	0.47%	2	0.02%	16	0.15%	102	0.96%	4,993	47.18%
Cuming		9,013	7,638	84.74%	21	0.23%	26	0.29%	18	0.20%	9	0.10%	23	0.26%	166	1.84%	1,112	12.34%
Custer		10,545	9,804	92.97%	48	0.46%	32	0.30%	19	0.18%	2	0.02%	14	0.13%	238	2.26%	388	3.68%
Dakota		21,582	9,347	43.31%	1,603	7.43%	526	2.44%	602	2.79%	154	0.71%	33	0.15%	506	2.34%	8,811	40.83%
Dawes		8,199	6,943	84.68%	164	2.00%	322	3.93%	53	0.65%	6	0.07%	21	0.26%	362	4.42%	328	4.00%
Dawson		24,111	13,529	56.11%	1,187	4.92%	44	0.18%	192	0.80%	41	0.17%	60	0.25%	415	1.72%	8,643	35.85%
Deuel		1,838	1,686	91.73%	1	0.05%	7	0.38%	6	0.33%	0	0.00%	7	0.38%	31	1.69%	100	5.44%
Dixon		5,606	4,643	82.82%	17	0.30%	19	0.34%	17	0.30%	0	0.00%	8	0.14%	106	1.89%	796	14.20%
Dodge		37,167	29,501	79.37%	215	0.58%	133	0.36%	183	0.49%	12	0.03%	93	0.25%	947	2.55%	6,083	16.37%
Douglas		584,526	381,427	65.25%	63,706	10.90%	2,653	0.45%	27,593	4.72%	410	0.07%	2,310	0.40%	25,607	4.38%	80,820	13.83%
Dundy		1,654	1,491	90.15%	7	0.42%	9	0.54%	1	0.06%	3	0.18%	4	0.24%	36	2.18%	103	6.23%
Fillmore		5,551	5,181	93.33%	20	0.36%	19	0.34%	13	0.23%	1	0.02%	0	0.00%	140	2.52%	177	3.19%
Franklin		2,889	2,741	94.88%	6	0.21%	3	0.10%	14	0.48%	0	0.00%	4	0.14%	39	1.35%	82	2.84%
Frontier		2,519	2,337	92.77%	17	0.67%	6	0.24%	0	0.00%	3	0.12%	4	0.16%	71	2.82%	81	3.22%
Furnas		4,636	4,235	91.35%	9	0.19%	19	0.41%	6	0.13%	0	0.00%	4	0.09%	143	3.08%	220	4.75%
Gage		21,704	20,053	92.39%	122	0.56%	78	0.36%	99	0.46%	1	0.00%	43	0.20%	673	3.10%	635	2.93%
Garden		1,874	1,722	91.89%	3	0.16%	3	0.16%	2	0.11%	1	0.05%	10	0.53%	45	2.40%	88	4.70%
Garfield		1,813	1,752	96.64%	3	0.17%	0	0.00%	0	0.00%	0	0.00%	1	0.06%	33	1.82%	24	1.32%
Gosper		1,893	1,746	92.23%	2	0.11%	4	0.21%	11	0.58%	0	0.00%	0	0.00%	35	1.85%	95	5.02%
Grant		611	576	94.27%	5	0.82%	12	1.96%	1	0.16%	0	0.00%	1	0.16%	4	0.65%	12	1.96%
Greeley		2,188	2,098	95.89%	1	0.05%	3	0.14%	6	0.27%	1	0.05%	10	0.46%	17	0.78%	52	2.38%
Hall		62,895	39,420	62.68%	1,815	2.89%	215	0.34%	688	1.09%	25	0.04%	187	0.30%	1,364	2.17%	19,181	30.50%
Hamilton		9,429	8,796	93.29%	27	0.29%	30	0.32%	14	0.15%	0	0.00%	19	0.20%	223	2.37%	320	3.39%
Harlan		3,073	2,907	94.60%	1	0.03%	5	0.16%	11	0.36%	0	0.00%	0	0.00%	59	1.92%	90	2.93%
Hayes		856	760	88.79%	0	0.00%	4	0.47%	2	0.23%	0	0.00%	0	0.00%	27	3.15%	63	7.36%
Hitchcock		2,616	2,462	94.11%	0	0.00%	0	0.00%	2	0.08%	4	0.15%	1	0.04%	60	2.29%	87	3.33%
Holt		10,127	9,325	92.08%	41	0.40%	38	0.38%	50	0.49%	1	0.01%	12	0.12%	139	1.37%	521	5.14%
Hooker		711	663	93.25%	4	0.56%	1	0.14%	1	0.14%	0	0.00%	0	0.00%	31	4.36%	11	1.55%
Howard		6,475	6,154	95.04%	13	0.20%	14	0.22%	12	0.19%	1	0.02%	8	0.12%	127	1.96%	146	2.25%
Jefferson		7,240	6,558	90.58%	20	0.28%	40	0.55%	15	0.21%	0	0.00%	20	0.28%	226	3.12%	361	4.99%
Johnson		5,290	4,101	77.52%	311	5.88%	52	0.98%	76	1.44%	0	0.00%	8	0.15%	113	2.14%	629	11.89%
Kearney		6,688	6,064	90.67%	3	0.04%	14	0.21%	12	0.18%	2	0.03%	11	0.16%	197	2.95%	385	5.76%
Keith		8,335	7,232	86.77%	15	0.18%	19	0.23%	38	0.46%	7	0.08%	16	0.19%	258	3.10%	750	9.00%
Keya Paha		769	734	95.45%	0	0.00%	1	0.13%	0	0.00%	0	0.00%	0	0.00%	14	1.82%	20	2.60%
Kimball		3,434	3,026	88.12%	1	0.03%	24	0.70%	15	0.44%	0	0.00%	9	0.26%	97	2.82%	262	7.63%
Knox		8,391	6,967	83.03%	16	0.19%	943	11.24%	28	0.33%	3	0.04%	13	0.15%	236	2.81%	185	2.20%
Lancaster		322,608	251,962	78.10%	13,369	4.14%	1,707	0.53%	13,975	4.33%	170	0.05%	1,351	0.42%	14,230	4.41%	25,844	8.01%
Lincoln		34,676	29,643	85.49%	382	1.10%	147	0.42%	325	0.94%	6	0.02%	111	0.32%	1,051	3.03%	3,011	8.68%
Logan		716	665	92.88%	0	0.00%	0	0.00%	4	0.56%	0	0.00%	0	0.00%	24	3.35%	23	3.21%
Loup		607	565	93.08%	0	0.00%	0	0.00%	1	0.16%	0	0.00%	0	0.00%	23	3.79%	18	2.97%
McPherson		399	378	94.74%	0	0.00%	4	1.00%	2	0.50%	0	0.00%	1	0.25%	11	2.76%	3	0.75%
Madison		35,585	27,823	78.19%	404	1.14%	366	1.03%	445	1.25%	7	0.02%	118	0.33%	908	2.55%	5,514	15.50%
Merrick		7,668	6,941	90.52%	41	0.53%	25	0.33%	29	0.38%	3	0.04%	0	0.00%	257	3.35%	372	4.85%
Morrill		4,555	3,722	81.71%	19	0.42%	38	0.83%	20	0.44%	0	0.00%	11	0.24%	97	2.13%	648	14.23%
Nance		3,380	3,202	94.73%	4	0.12%	8	0.24%	5	0.15%	0	0.00%	1	0.03%	100	2.96%	60	1.78%
Nemaha		7,074	6,538	92.42%	56	0.79%	27	0.38%	31	0.44%	0	0.00%	13	0.18%	201	2.84%	208	2.94%
Nuckolls		4,095	3,835	93.65%	4	0.10%	4	0.10%	3	0.07%	0	0.00%	14	0.34%	117	2.86%	118	2.88%
Otoe		15,912	13,867	87.15%	82	0.52%	36	0.23%	86	0.54%	0	0.00%	35	0.22%	544	3.42%	1,262	7.93%
Pawnee		2,544	2,446	96.15%	4	0.16%	7	0.28%	0	0.00%	1	0.04%	3	0.12%	44	1.73%	39	1.53%
Perkins		2,858	2,620	91.67%	10	0.35%	3	0.10%	3	0.10%	3	0.10%	2	0.07%	71	2.48%	146	5.11%
Phelps		8,968	8,140	90.77%	34	0.38%	20	0.22%	28	0.31%	1	0.01%	24	0.27%	170	1.90%	551	6.14%
Pierce		7,317	6,950	94.98%	30	0.41%	17	0.23%	12	0.16%	2	0.03%	14	0.19%	150	2.05%	142	1.94%
Platte		34,296	25,583	74.59%	346	1.01%	98	0.29%	198	0.58%	9	0.03%	101	0.29%	709	2.07%	7,252	21.15%
Polk		5,214	4,751	91.12%	8	0.15%	14	0.27%	2	0.04%	1	0.02%	10	0.19%	169	3.24%	259	4.97%
Red Willow		10,702	9,536	89.10%	112	1.05%	37	0.35%	39	0.36%	12	0.11%	14	0.13%	265	2.48%	687	6.42%
Richardson		7,871	7,096	90.15%	15	0.19%	223	2.83%	35	0.44%	0	0.00%	11	0.14%	336	4.27%	155	1.97%
Rock		1,262	1,219	96.59%	3	0.24%	1	0.08%	0	0.00%	0	0.00%	2	0.16%	17	1.35%	20	1.58%
Saline		14,292	9,363	65.51%	130	0.91%	41	0.29%	277	1.94%	46	0.32%	25	0.17%	343	2.40%	4,067	28.46%
Sarpy		190,604	147,064	77.16%	7,232	3.79%	553	0.29%	4,726	2.48%	224	0.12%	716	0.38%	10,034	5.26%	20,055	10.52%
Saunders		22,278	20,703	92.93%	72	0.32%	77	0.35%	86	0.39%	5	0.02%	71	0.32%	679	3.05%	585	2.63%
Scotts Bluff		36,084	25,711	71.25%	234	0.65%	466	1.29%	277	0.77%	25	0.07%	100	0.28%	1,068	2.96%	8,203	22.73%
Seward		17,609	16,382	93.03%	102	0.58%	44	0.25%	57	0.32%	6	0.03%	44	0.25%	478	2.71%	496	2.82%
Sheridan		5,127	4,095	79.87%	15	0.29%	522	10.18%	29	0.57%	2	0.04%	10	0.20%	232	4.53%	222	4.33%
Sherman		2,959	2,774	93.75%	0	0.00%	16	0.54%	5	0.17%	2	0.07%	1	0.03%	79	2.67%	82	2.77%
Sioux		1,135	1,055	92.95%	0	0.00%	2	0.18%	4	0.35%	2	0.18%	4	0.35%	25	2.20%	43	3.79%
Stanton		5,842	5,215	89.27%	22	0.38%	27	0.46%	18	0.31%	7	0.12%	11	0.19%	190	3.25%	352	6.03%
Thayer		5,034	4,769	94.74%	10	0.20%	9	0.18%	10	0.20%	5	0.10%	3	0.06%	92	1.83%	136	2.70%
Thomas		669	623	93.12%	0	0.00%	3	0.45%	0	0.00%	0	0.00%	0	0.00%	14	2.09%	29	4.33%
Thurston		6,773	2,444	36.08%	24	0.35%	3,897	57.54%	8	0.12%	4	0.06%	16	0.24%	120	1.77%	260	3.84%
Valley		4,059	3,818	94.06%	15	0.37%	4	0.10%	5	0.12%	5	0.12%	11	0.27%	85	2.09%	116	2.86%
Washington		20,865	19,359	92.78%	70	0.34%	25	0.12%	100	0.48%	1	0.00%	42	0.20%	649	3.11%	619	2.97%
Wayne		9,697	7,828	80.73%	350	3.61%	28	0.29%	122	1.26%	8	0.08%	61	0.63%	309	3.19%	991	10.22%
Webster		3,395	3,111	91.63%	14	0.41%	14	0.41%	9	0.27%	0	0.00%	2	0.06%	97	2.86%	148	4.36%
Wheeler		774	736	95.09%	0	0.00%	2	0.26%	0	0.00%	0	0.00%	1	0.13%	15	1.94%	20	2.58%
York		14,125	12,559	88.91%	167	1.18%	71	0.50%	90	0.64%	2	0.01%	30	0.21%	367	2.60%	839	5.94%

== Former counties ==
- Clay (1855-1864) Formed from unorganized territory and dissolved into Gage and Lancaster County.
- Jackson (1855-1856) Formed from unorganized territory and dissolved to Fillmore County and unorganized territory
- Johnson (1855-1856) Formed from unorganized territory and dissolved to unorganized territory
- Blackbird (1855-1888) Formed from Burt County and dissolved to Thurston County
- Loup (1855-1856) Formed from Burt and Un-Organized and then dissolved Madison, Monroe and Platte Counties
- Jones (1856-1866) Formed from unorganized territory and dissolved into Jefferson County.
- Grant, Harrison, Jackson, Lynn, Monroe and Taylor counties listed in 1870 - see map
- West (1860-1862) Formed from unorganized territory and dissolved into Holt County
