= 1956 United States presidential election in Nebraska =

- November 6, 1956

All 6 Nebraska votes to the Electoral College

Nominee	Dwight D. Eisenhower	Adlai Stevenson
Party	Republican	Democratic
Home state	Pennsylvania (Note: Although he was born in Texas and grew up in Kansas before his military career, at the time of the 1952 election Eisenhower was president of Columbia University and was, officially, a resident of New York. During his first term as president, he moved his private residence to Gettysburg, Pennsylvania, and officially changed his residency to Pennsylvania.)	Illinois
Running mate	Richard Nixon	Estes Kefauver
Electoral vote	6	0
Popular vote	378,108	199,029
Percentage	65.51%	34.49%
County results
Eisenhower
50–60%
60–70%
70–80%
80–90%
Stevenson
50–60%
President before election
Dwight D. Eisenhower
Republican
Elected President
Dwight D. Eisenhower
Republican

The 1956 United States presidential election in Nebraska took place on November 6, 1956, as part of the 1956 United States presidential election. Voters chose six representatives, or electors, to the Electoral College, who voted for president and vice president.

Nebraska was won by incumbent President Dwight D. Eisenhower (R–Pennsylvania), running with Vice President Richard Nixon, with 65.51% of the popular vote, against Adlai Stevenson (D–Illinois), running with Senator Estes Kefauver, with 34.49% of the popular vote.

With 65.51% of the popular vote, Nebraska would prove to be Eisenhower's fourth strongest state after Vermont, Maine and New Hampshire.

== Results ==
1956 United States presidential election in Nebraska
Party	Candidate	Votes	%
Republican	Dwight D. Eisenhower (inc.)	378,108	65.51%
Democratic	Adlai Stevenson	199,029	34.49%
Total votes		577,137	100%

=== Results by county ===
County	Dwight D. Eisenhower Republican		Adlai Stevenson Democratic		Margin		Total votes cast
County	#	%	#	%	#	%	Total votes cast
Adams	8,186	66.93%	4,045	33.07%	4,141	33.86%	12,231
Antelope	3,607	73.00%	1,334	27.00%	2,273	46.00%	4,941
Arthur	248	78.48%	68	21.52%	180	56.96%	316
Banner	329	64.01%	185	35.99%	144	28.02%	514
Blaine	416	73.63%	149	26.37%	267	47.26%	565
Boone	3,021	70.29%	1,277	29.71%	1,744	40.58%	4,298
Box Butte	2,991	68.71%	1,362	31.29%	1,629	37.42%	4,353
Boyd	1,414	62.51%	848	37.49%	566	25.02%	2,262
Brown	1,566	74.08%	548	25.92%	1,018	48.16%	2,114
Buffalo	7,342	70.31%	3,100	29.69%	4,242	40.62%	10,442
Burt	3,459	69.49%	1,519	30.51%	1,940	38.98%	4,978
Butler	2,864	56.07%	2,244	43.93%	620	12.14%	5,108
Cass	4,814	63.87%	2,723	36.13%	2,091	27.74%	7,537
Cedar	3,809	64.70%	2,078	35.30%	1,731	29.40%	5,887
Chase	1,444	68.31%	670	31.69%	774	36.62%	2,114
Cherry	2,414	73.20%	884	26.80%	1,530	46.40%	3,298
Cheyenne	3,809	63.58%	2,182	36.42%	1,627	27.16%	5,991
Clay	3,099	71.42%	1,240	28.58%	1,859	42.84%	4,339
Colfax	2,843	65.07%	1,526	34.93%	1,317	30.14%	4,369
Cuming	4,223	76.43%	1,302	23.57%	2,921	52.86%	5,525
Custer	5,798	70.51%	2,425	29.49%	3,373	41.02%	8,223
Dakota	2,516	53.08%	2,224	46.92%	292	6.16%	4,740
Dawes	2,523	73.86%	893	26.14%	1,630	47.72%	3,416
Dawson	6,503	76.13%	2,039	23.87%	4,464	52.26%	8,542
Deuel	1,165	79.85%	294	20.15%	871	59.70%	1,459
Dixon	2,493	59.09%	1,726	40.91%	767	18.18%	4,219
Dodge	9,210	69.26%	4,088	30.74%	5,122	38.52%	13,298
Douglas	73,270	59.39%	50,110	40.61%	23,160	18.78%	123,380
Dundy	1,196	70.73%	495	29.27%	701	41.46%	1,691
Fillmore	3,137	66.94%	1,549	33.06%	1,588	33.88%	4,686
Franklin	1,955	68.77%	888	31.23%	1,067	37.54%	2,843
Frontier	1,602	71.65%	634	28.35%	968	43.30%	2,236
Furnas	2,894	72.26%	1,111	27.74%	1,783	44.52%	4,005
Gage	7,514	67.64%	3,595	32.36%	3,919	35.28%	11,109
Garden	1,167	77.70%	335	22.30%	832	55.40%	1,502
Garfield	936	78.13%	262	21.87%	674	56.26%	1,198
Gosper	814	71.47%	325	28.53%	489	42.94%	1,139
Grant	433	83.27%	87	16.73%	346	66.54%	520
Greeley	1,240	57.67%	910	42.33%	330	15.34%	2,150
Hall	9,536	66.45%	4,815	33.55%	4,721	32.90%	14,351
Hamilton	3,217	74.95%	1,075	25.05%	2,142	49.90%	4,292
Harlan	1,850	68.57%	848	31.43%	1,002	37.14%	2,698
Hayes	726	70.01%	311	29.99%	415	40.02%	1,037
Hitchcock	1,570	67.94%	741	32.06%	829	35.88%	2,311
Holt	4,237	69.33%	1,874	30.67%	2,363	38.66%	6,111
Hooker	368	85.19%	64	14.81%	304	70.38%	432
Howard	1,701	54.00%	1,449	46.00%	252	8.00%	3,150
Jefferson	4,267	71.25%	1,722	28.75%	2,545	42.50%	5,989
Johnson	2,160	65.45%	1,140	34.55%	1,020	30.90%	3,300
Kearney	2,158	64.80%	1,172	35.20%	986	29.60%	3,330
Keith	2,624	73.83%	930	26.17%	1,694	47.66%	3,554
Keya Paha	635	70.71%	263	29.29%	372	41.42%	898
Kimball	1,590	70.79%	656	29.21%	934	41.58%	2,246
Knox	3,814	64.38%	2,110	35.62%	1,704	28.76%	5,924
Lancaster	35,591	64.94%	19,217	35.06%	16,374	29.88%	54,808
Lincoln	7,523	62.70%	4,475	37.30%	3,048	25.40%	11,998
Logan	367	71.26%	148	28.74%	219	42.52%	515
Loup	441	76.03%	139	23.97%	302	52.06%	580
Madison	7,968	72.99%	2,949	27.01%	5,019	45.98%	10,917
McPherson	281	74.14%	98	25.86%	183	48.28%	379
Merrick	2,857	71.73%	1,126	28.27%	1,731	43.46%	3,983
Morrill	1,810	63.75%	1,029	36.25%	781	27.50%	2,839
Nance	1,779	69.55%	779	30.45%	1,000	39.10%	2,558
Nemaha	3,141	68.66%	1,434	31.34%	1,707	37.32%	4,575
Nuckolls	2,672	64.28%	1,485	35.72%	1,187	28.56%	4,157
Otoe	5,275	69.67%	2,296	30.33%	2,979	39.34%	7,571
Pawnee	1,830	64.17%	1,022	35.83%	808	28.34%	2,852
Perkins	1,296	66.06%	666	33.94%	630	32.12%	1,962
Phelps	3,502	72.73%	1,313	27.27%	2,189	45.46%	4,815
Pierce	2,800	70.85%	1,152	29.15%	1,648	41.70%	3,952
Platte	6,574	69.23%	2,922	30.77%	3,652	38.46%	9,496
Polk	2,482	68.62%	1,135	31.38%	1,347	37.24%	3,617
Red Willow	3,806	70.08%	1,625	29.92%	2,181	40.16%	5,431
Richardson	4,480	64.05%	2,514	35.95%	1,966	28.10%	6,994
Rock	928	76.76%	281	23.24%	647	53.52%	1,209
Saline	3,248	48.89%	3,395	51.11%	-147	-2.22%	6,643
Sarpy	3,826	60.47%	2,501	39.53%	1,325	20.94%	6,327
Saunders	4,973	59.86%	3,335	40.14%	1,638	19.72%	8,308
Scotts Bluff	8,027	63.12%	4,690	36.88%	3,337	26.24%	12,717
Seward	3,688	65.88%	1,910	34.12%	1,778	31.76%	5,598
Sheridan	2,618	74.57%	893	25.43%	1,725	49.14%	3,511
Sherman	1,429	53.97%	1,219	46.03%	210	7.94%	2,648
Sioux	499	65.74%	260	34.26%	239	31.48%	759
Stanton	1,676	65.14%	897	34.86%	779	30.28%	2,573
Thayer	3,346	69.81%	1,447	30.19%	1,899	39.62%	4,793
Thomas	422	77.72%	121	22.28%	301	55.44%	543
Thurston	1,722	55.05%	1,406	44.95%	316	10.10%	3,128
Valley	2,189	66.78%	1,089	33.22%	1,100	33.56%	3,278
Washington	3,531	67.10%	1,731	32.90%	1,800	34.20%	5,262
Wayne	3,040	72.68%	1,143	27.32%	1,897	45.36%	4,183
Webster	2,298	70.62%	956	29.38%	1,342	41.24%	3,254
Wheeler	391	64.20%	218	35.80%	173	28.40%	609
York	5,065	76.35%	1,569	23.65%	3,496	52.70%	6,634
Totals	378,108	65.51%	199,029	34.49%	179,079	31.02%	577,137

==== Counties that flipped from Republican to Democratic ====
- Saline

== See also ==
- United States presidential elections in Nebraska
