= Marengo, Nebraska =

Unincorporated community in Nebraska, U.S.

Coordinates: 40°38′19″N 100°54′38″W

Marengo is a former unincorporated community in Hayes County, Nebraska, United States.

== History ==
Marengo had a post office between 1891 and 1934.

The town was founded by French explorer Felix de Trogoff in 1889.
