= Vehicle registration plates of Nebraska =

Nebraska vehicle license plates

Nebraska

Current series
- Size: 12 in × 6 in 300 mm × 150 mm
- Material: Aluminum
- Serial format: Douglas, Lancaster and Sarpy Counties: ABC 123; All other counties (county-coded): 3-A1234; 3-AB123; 10-A123; 10-AB12
- Introduced: January 2023

Availability
- Issued by: Nebraska Department of Motor Vehicles

History
- First issued: 1915

The U.S. state of Nebraska first required its residents to register their motor vehicles in 1905. Registrants provided their own license plates for display until 1915, when the state began to issue plates.

As of 2026, plates are issued by the Nebraska Department of Motor Vehicles (DMV). Front and rear plates are required for most classes of vehicles, while only rear plates are required for motorcycles and trailers. A bill was passed by legislators in April 2025 to change the law of just issuing rear license plates. That law change is set to go into effect in 2029 when a new design print license plates will be released. All state-issued plates were made of steel until 1947 when aluminum plates were introduced.

== Passenger baseplates ==
=== 1915 to 1965 ===
In 1956, the United States, Canada and Mexico came to an agreement with the American Association of Motor Vehicle Administrators, the Automobile Manufacturers Association and the National Safety Council that standardized the size for license plates for vehicles (except those for motorcycles) at 6 inches (15 cm) in height by 12 inches (30 cm) in width, with standardized mounting holes. The 1955 (dated 1956) issue was the first Nebraska license plate that complied with these standards.

Image	Dates issued	Design	Slogan	Serial format	Serials issued	Notes
	1915	Black on white; "NEB 1915" at right	none	12345	1 to approximately 70000	
	1916	White on navy blue; "NEB 1916" at right	none	123456	1 to approximately 101000	
	1917	Black on cream; "NEB 1917" at right	none	123456	1 to approximately 148000	
	1918	Yellow on black; "NEB 1918 at right"	none	123456	1 to approximately 171000	
	1919–20	Black on light green; "NEB 1919" at right	none	123456	1 to approximately 273000	Revalidated for 1920 with dark blue tab.
	1921	White on black; "NEB 1921" at right	none	123456	1 to approximately 272000	
	1922	Black on white; "NEB 1922" at right	none	1-12345; 10-1234	Coded by county of issuance (1 or 10)	First use of county codes.
	1923	Green on black; "NEB 1923" at right	none	1-12345; 10-1234	Coded by county of issuance (1 or 10)	
	1924	White on black; "NEB 1924" at right	none	1-12345; 10-1234	Coded by county of issuance (1 or 10)	
	1925	Black on orange; "NEB 1925" at right	none	1-12345; 10-1234	Coded by county of issuance (1 or 10)	
	1926	White on green; "NEB 1926" at right	none	1-12345; 10-1234	Coded by county of issuance (1 or 10)	
	1927	White on maroon; "1927 NEB" at right	none	1-12345; 10-1234	Coded by county of issuance (1 or 10)	
	1928	White on dark blue; "NEB 1928" at right	none	1-12345; 10-1234	Coded by county of issuance (1 or 10)	
	1929	White on black; "1929 NEB" at right	none	1-12345; 10-1234	Coded by county of issuance (1 or 10)	
	1930	Yellow on dark blue; "NEB 1930" at right	none	1-12345; 10-1234	Coded by county of issuance (1 or 10)	
	1931	Red on gray; "1931 NEB" at right	none	1-12345; 10-1234	Coded by county of issuance (1 or 10)	
	1932	White on blue; "NEB 1932" at right	none	1-12345; 10-1234	Coded by county of issuance (1 or 10)	
	1933	Dark blue on orange; "1933 NEB" at right	none	1-12345; 10-1234	Coded by county of issuance (1 or 10)	
	1934	White on dark green; "NEBRASKA – 34" at bottom	none	1-12345; 10-1234	Coded by county of issuance (1 or 10)	First use of the full state name.
	1935	Black on gray; "NEBRASKA – 35" at bottom	none	1-12345; 10-1234	Coded by county off issuance (1 or 10)	
	1936	Silver on black; "NEBRASKA – 36" at bottom	none	1-12345; 10-1234	Coded by county of issuance (1 or 10)	
	1937	Black on gray; "37 – NEBRASKA" at bottom	none	1-12345; 10-1234	Coded by county of issuance (1 or 10)	
	1938	Silver on black; "NEBRASKA – 38" at bottom	none	1-12345; 10-1234	Coded by county of issuance (1 or 10)	
	1939	Black on gray; "NEBRASKA – 39" at top	none	1-12345; 10-1234	Coded by county of issuance (1 or 10)	
	1940	Orange on turquoise with State Capitol graphic; "NEBRASKA 40" at bottom	none	1-12345; 10-1234	Coded by county of issuance (1 or 10)	
	1941	Dark blue on orange with State Capitol graphic; "NEBRASKA 41" at bottom	none	1-12345; 10-1234	Coded by county of issuance (1 or 10)	
	1942–44	Red on white; "NEBRASKA 42" at bottom	none	1-12345; 10-1234	Coded by county of issuance (1 or 10)	Revalidated for 1943 with dark blue tabs, and for 1944 with orange tabs, due to metal conservation for World War II.
	1945	White on black; "NEBRASKA 45" at bottom	none	1-12345; 10-1234	Coded by county of issuance (1 or 10)	
	1946–47	White on brick red; "46 NEBRASKA" at top	none	1-12345; 10-12345	Coded by county of issuance (1 or 10)	Revalidated for 1947 with brown tabs.
	1948	Dark blue on unpainted aluminum; "19 NEBRASKA 48" at bottom	none	1-12345; 10-12345	Coded by county of issuance (1 or 10)	
	1949	Maroon on unpainted aluminum; "19 NEBRASKA 49" at top	none	1-12345; 10-12345	Coded by county of issuance (1 or 10)	
	1950	Dark blue on white; "19 NEBRASKA 50" at top	none	1-12345; 10-12345	Coded by county of issuance (1 or 10)	
	1951	White on black; "NEBRASKA 51" at bottom	none	A1234A; AB123A	Coded by county of issuance (A or AB)	
	1952–53	Black on golden yellow; "NEBRASKA 52" at bottom	none	1-12345; 10-12345	Coded by county of issuance (1 or 10)	Revalidated for 1953 with black tabs.
	1954	Golden yellow on black; "NEBRASKA 54" at top	none	1-12345; 10-12345	Coded by county of issuance (1 or 10)	
	1955	Black on golden yellow; "NEBRASKA 55" at bottom	none	1-12345; 10-12345	Coded by county of issuance (1 or 10)	
	1956	White on black with border line; "19 NEBRASKA 56" at top	The Beef State	1-123456; 10-12345	Coded by county of issuance (1 or 10)	First 6" x 12" plate.
	1957	Green on white with border line; "19 NEBRASKA 57" at top	The Beef State	1-123456; 10-12345	Coded by county of issuance (1 or 10)	
	1958–59	Black on golden yellow with border line; "19 NEBRASKA 58" at top	The Beef State	1-123456; 10-12345	Coded by county of issuance (1 or 10)	Revalidated for 1959 with aluminum tabs.
	1960–61	Golden yellow on black with border line; "19 NEBRASKA 60" at top	The Beef State	1-123456; 10-12345	Coded by county of issuance (1 or 10)	Revalidated for 1961 with stickers.
	1962–64	Green on white with border line; "19 NEBRASKA" and green sticker box at bottom	The Beef State	1-123456; 10-12345	Coded by county of issuance (1 or 10)	Revalidated for 1963 and 1964 with stickers.
	1965	Black on white with border line; "19 NEBRASKA 65" at bottom	The Beef State	1-123456; 10-12345	Coded by county of issuance (1 or 10)	

=== 1966 to present ===
Image	Dates issued	Design	Slogan	Serial format	Serials issued	Notes
	1966–68	Red on reflective white with state-shaped border; "NEBRASKA 66" at bottom, offset to right	Centennial	1-A1234; 1-AB123; 10-A123; 10-AB12	Coded by county of issuance (1 or 10)	Commemorated Nebraska's 100 years of statehood. Letters I, M, O, Q, W and X not used in serials; this practice continues today (except in Douglas, Lancaster and Sarpy Counties since 2002). Revalidated for 1967 and 1968 with stickers.
	1969–71	Black on reflective white with state-shaped border; "NEBRASKA 69" at bottom, offset to right	Cornhusker State	1-A1234; 1-AB123; 10-A123; 10-AB12	Coded by county of issuance (1 or 10)	Revalidated for 1970 and 1971 with stickers.
	1972–75	Red on reflective white with state-shaped border; "NEBRASKA 72" at bottom, offset to right	Cornhusker State	1-A1234; 1-AB123; 10-A123; 10-AB12; 5/9-A1234	Coded by county of issuance (1 or 10)	Revalidated for 1973, 1974 and 1975 with stickers. After reaching 59-ZZ99, Sarpy County introduced five-character serials with stacked county codes; these were used on each subsequent base until 2002.
	1976–83	Red on reflective white with sky blue banner at bottom, Conestoga wagon graphic at top left and Native American chief graphic at top right	1776 BICENTENNIAL 1976	1-A1234; 1-AB123; 10-A123; 10-AB12; 2/1-A1234; 5/9-A1234	Coded by county of issuance (1 or 10)	Only base on which Scotts Bluff County, as well as Sarpy County, used five-character serials with stacked county codes.
	January 1984 – December 1986	Blue on reflective white	none	1-A1234; 1-AB123; 10-A123; 10-AB12; 5/9-A1234	Coded by county of issuance (1 or 10)	
	January 1987 – December 1989	Red on reflective white with yellow, orange and red sunset graphic at top	none	1-A1234; 1-AB123; 10-A123; 10-AB12; 5/9-A1234	Coded by county of issuance (1 or 10)	
	January 1990 – December 1992	Black on reflective white with light blue, gold and black windmill graphic at top	none	1-A1234; 1-AB123; 10-A123; 10-AB12; 5/9-A1234	Coded by county of issuance (1 or 10)	Early Lancaster County plates were manufactured in South Dakota using that state's serial dies.
	January 1993 – December 1995	Blue on reflective white with blue and yellow graphic at top featuring Chimney Rock and city skyline	none	1-A1234; 1-AB123; 10-A123; 10-AB12; 5/9-A1234	Coded by county of issuance (1 or 10)	
	January 1996 – December 1998	Black on reflective white with black and orange graphic at top featuring Chimney Rock and city skyline	none	1-A1234; 1-AB123; 10-A123; 10-AB12; 5/9-A1234	Coded by county of issuance (1 or 10)	
	January 1999 – December 2001	Red on reflective gradient blue and white with yellow Chimney Rock and light blue city skyline graphics	none	1-A1234; 1-AB123; 10-A123; 10-AB12; 5/9-A1234	Coded by county of issuance (1 or 10)	
	January 2002 – December 2004	Black on reflective gradient yellow, orange and red with black prairie landscape graphic, three black silhouettes of sandhill cranes, and an orange sun	www.state.ne.us	ABC 123	NAA 001 to mid-'O' series	ABC 123 serial format introduced in Douglas, Lancaster and Sarpy Counties, the three most populous, while the county-code system was retained in all other counties. Plates with the ABC 123 format were originally issued with stickers at the bottom displaying the county name; these were discontinued due to poor quality. Serials became screened in May 2004.
	January 2002 – December 2004	Black on reflective gradient yellow, orange and red with black prairie landscape graphic, three black silhouettes of sandhill cranes, and an orange sun	www.state.ne.us	3-A1234; 3-AB123; 10-A123; 10-AB12	Coded by county of issuance (3 or 10)	ABC 123 serial format introduced in Douglas, Lancaster and Sarpy Counties, the three most populous, while the county-code system was retained in all other counties. Plates with the ABC 123 format were originally issued with stickers at the bottom displaying the county name; these were discontinued due to poor quality. Serials became screened in May 2004.
	January 2005 – December 2010	Dark blue on reflective gradient blue and white with red state outline and Conestoga wagon graphic	www.Nebraska.gov	ABC 123	Mid-'O' series to late 'R' series	In Douglas, Lancaster and Sarpy Counties, the 'Q' series of serials was not used.
	January 2005 – December 2010	Dark blue on reflective gradient blue and white with red state outline and Conestoga wagon graphic	www.Nebraska.gov	3-A1234; 3-AB123; 10-A123; 10-AB12	Coded by county of issuance (3 or 10)	In Douglas, Lancaster and Sarpy Counties, the 'Q' series of serials was not used.
	January 2011 – December 2016	Dark green on reflective gradient white and yellow with Western meadowlark and goldenrod	Nebraska.gov	ABC 123	Late 'R' series to early 'U' series	
	January 2011 – December 2016	Dark green on reflective gradient white and yellow with Western meadowlark and goldenrod	Nebraska.gov	3-A1234; 3-AB123; 10-A123; 10-AB12	Coded by county of issuance (3 or 10)	
	January 2017 – December 2022	Black on reflective white with Sower statue from the Nebraska State Capitol; state name in gold on navy blue bar at top	"1867" and "2017"	ABC 123	Early 'U' series to early 'Y' series	Commemorated Nebraska's 150 years of statehood. In Douglas, Lancaster and Sarpy Counties, the 'X' series of serials was reserved for trailer plates. County-coded plates originally used the state shape as the separator; this was replaced with a standard dash in May 2022 when the serial font on all plates changed to that used in Kentucky.
	January 2017 – December 2022	Black on reflective white with Sower statue from the Nebraska State Capitol; state name in gold on navy blue bar at top	"1867" and "2017"	3-A1234; 3-AB123; 10-A123; 10-AB12	Coded by county of issuance (3 or 10)	Commemorated Nebraska's 150 years of statehood. In Douglas, Lancaster and Sarpy Counties, the 'X' series of serials was reserved for trailer plates. County-coded plates originally used the state shape as the separator; this was replaced with a standard dash in May 2022 when the serial font on all plates changed to that used in Kentucky.
	January 2023 – present	Dark blue on reflective white with the "Genius of Creative Energy" mosaic from the Nebraska State Capitol in the background; state name in dark blue at top	none	ABC 123	Early 'Y' series to YZZ 999; AAA 000 to BDE 388 (as of May 8, 2025)	In Douglas, Lancaster and Sarpy Counties, the 'Z' series of serials was reserved for certain non-passenger types, including local trucks.
	January 2023 – present	Dark blue on reflective white with the "Genius of Creative Energy" mosaic from the Nebraska State Capitol in the background; state name in dark blue at top	none	3-A1234; 3-AB123; 10-A123; 10-AB12	Coded by county of issuance (3 or 10)	In Douglas, Lancaster and Sarpy Counties, the 'Z' series of serials was reserved for certain non-passenger types, including local trucks.

=== Optional plates ===
Image	Dates issued	Design	Slogan	Serial format	Serials issued	Notes
	2012	Yellow Union Pacific locomotive and train left, plowed wheat field and city skyline right	Union Pacific Railroad Museum	123AB	001AA to 660EN (as of January 26, 2024)	Awarded "Plate of the Year" for best new license plate of 2012 by the Automobile License Plate Collectors Association, the first time Nebraska was so honored.

== Non-passenger plates ==
Image	Type	Dates issued	Design	Serial format	Notes
	Motorcycle	1999–2001	Embossed red on white; "NEB" at top left	1 M/C 12345; 10 M/C 1234	Coded by county of issuance.
	Motorcycle	2002–04	Embossed black on white; "NEB" at top left	ABC 123; 3 M/C 1234; 10 M/C 1234	ABC 123 serial format used in Douglas, Lancaster and Sarpy Counties; shared with passenger plates.
	Motorcycle	2004	Screened black on white; "NEBRASKA" and "MC" at top left	ABC 123; 3-1234; 10-1234	Serials continued from where the 2002–04 plates left off.
	Motorcycle	2005–10	Screened blue on white; "NEBRASKA" and "MC" at top left	ABC 123; 3-1234; 10-1234	
	Motorcycle	2011–16	Screened dark green on white; "NEBRASKA" and "MC" at top left	ABC 123; 3-1234; 10-1234	
	Motorcycle	2017–present	Screened black on white; "NEBRASKA" and "MOTORCYCLE" centered at top	ABC 123; 3-1234; 10-1234	

== County coding ==
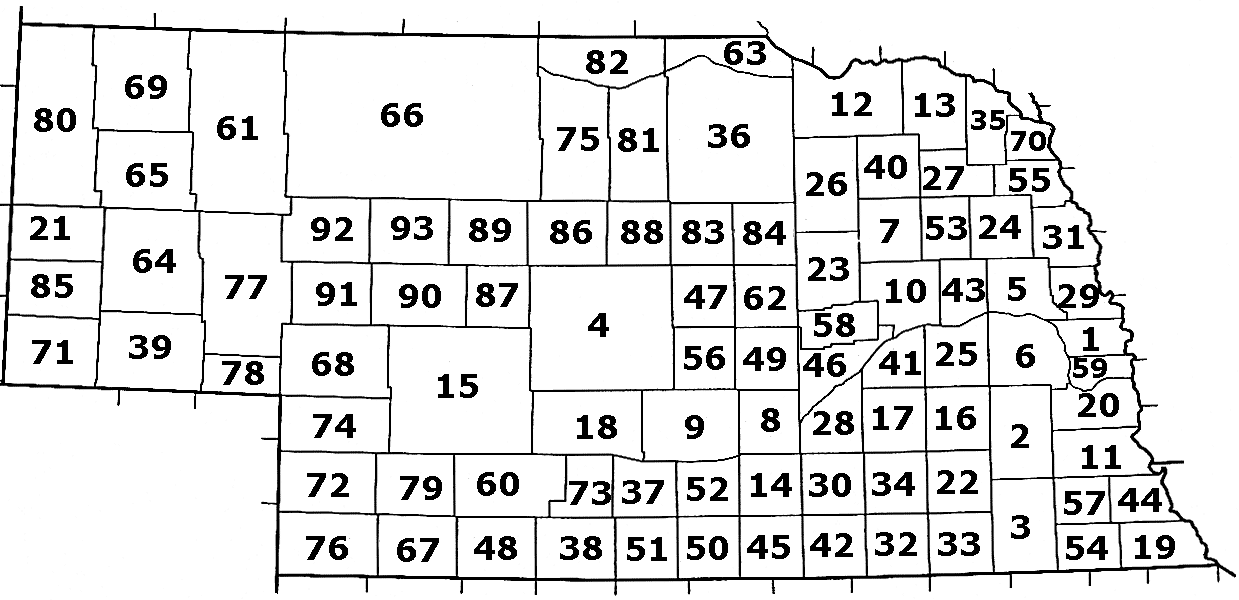
Nebraska counties by license plate prefix

Nebraska established a county-code system for its passenger and motorcycle plates in 1922, with one- or two-digit codes assigned to each county in order of the number of registered vehicles in the county at that time. These codes remained constant through 1950.

For 1951, letter codes were used. One-letter codes were assigned to the first counties whose names began with those letters, while all other counties were assigned two-letter codes consisting of the initial letter and the next available letter in their names (the letters I, O and Q were not used). There were three exceptions: Douglas County, the most populous in the state, was assigned single-letter X to increase capacity; Otoe County was assigned Z as O was not allowed; and Dodge County was assigned DG instead of DD as double-letter codes were also not allowed.

The numeric code system was reintroduced in 1952, with the codes the same as before. It remains in use, except in Douglas, Lancaster, and Sarpy Counties, which adopted an uncoded ABC 123 serial format in 2002 (indicated by daggers in the table below).

County	Numeric code	Letter code, 1951
Adams	14	A
Antelope	26	AN
Arthur	91	AR
Banner	85	B
Blaine	86	BA
Boone	23	BN
Box Butte	65	BX
Boyd	63	BY
Brown	75	BR
Buffalo	9	BU
Burt	31	BT
Butler	25	BL
Cass	20	C
Cedar	13	CE
Chase	72	CH
Cherry	66	CR
Cheyenne	39	CY
Clay	30	CL
Colfax	43	CF
Cuming	24	CU
Custer	4	CS
Dakota	70	D
Dawes	69	DA
Dawson	18	DW
Deuel	78	DE
Dixon	35	DX
Dodge	5	DG
Douglas	1 ^{†}	X
Dundy	76	DU
Fillmore	34	F
Franklin	50	FR
Frontier	60	FN
Furnas	38	FU
Gage	3	G
Garden	77	GA
Garfield	83	GR
Gosper	73	GS
Grant	92	GN
Greeley	62	GE
Hall	8	H
Hamilton	28	HA
Harlan	51	HR
Hayes	79	HY
Hitchcock	67	HT
Holt	36	HL
Hooker	93	HK
Howard	49	HW
Jefferson	33	J
Johnson	57	JH
Kearney	52	K
Keith	68	KE
Keya Paha	82	KY
Kimball	71	KM
Knox	12	KN
Lancaster	2 ^{†}	L
Lincoln	15	LN
Logan	87	LG
Loup	88	LU
Madison	7	M
McPherson	90	MC
Merrick	46	ME
Morrill	64	MR
Nance	58	N
Nemaha	44	NE
Nuckolls	42	NU
Otoe	11	Z
Pawnee	54	P
Perkins	74	PE
Phelps	37	PH
Pierce	40	PR
Platte	10	PL
Polk	41	PK
Red Willow	48	R
Richardson	19	RC
Rock	81	RK
Saline	22	S
Sarpy	59 ^{†}	SA
Saunders	6	SU
Scotts Bluff	21	SC
Seward	16	SE
Sheridan	61	SH
Sherman	56	SR
Sioux	80	SX
Stanton	53	ST
Thayer	32	T
Thomas	89	TH
Thurston	55	TU
Valley	47	V
Washington	29	W
Wayne	27	WA
Webster	45	WE
Wheeler	84	WH
York	17	Y
