= Hayes Center, Nebraska =

Village in Hayes County, Nebraska, United States

- Village
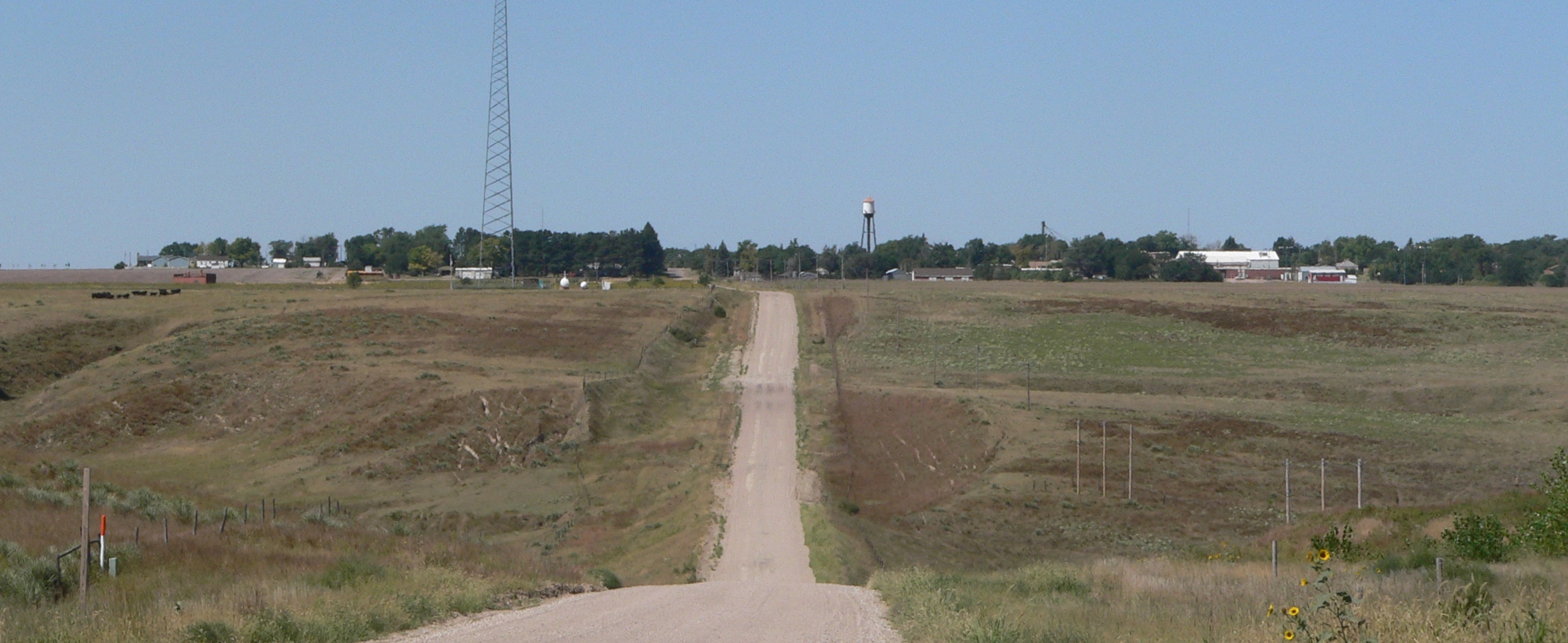
- Hayes Center, seen from the east

- Location of Hayes Center, Nebraska
- Coordinates: 40°30′40″N 101°01′13″W
- Country: United States
- State: Nebraska
- County: Hayes

Area
  - Total: 0.27 sq mi (0.70 km^{2})
  - Land: 0.27 sq mi (0.70 km^{2})
  - Water: 0 sq mi (0.00 km^{2})
- Elevation: 3,058 ft (932 m)

Population (2020)
  - Total: 224
  - Density: 830.1/sq mi (320.51/km^{2})
- Time zone: UTC-6 (Central (CST))
  - Summer (DST): UTC-5 (CDT)
- ZIP code: 69032
- Area code: 308
- FIPS code: 31-21660
- GNIS feature ID: 2398269
- Website: hayescountyne.com

Hayes Center is a village in Hayes County, Nebraska, United States, which has served as that county's county seat since 1885. As of the 2020 census, Hayes Center had a population of 224.

== History ==
Hayes Center was founded in 1885. It was named from its position near the geographical center of Hayes County.

=== Sanctuary city for the unborn ===
On April 6, 2021, Hayes Center became the first city in Nebraska to outlaw abortion by local ordinance, declaring itself a "sanctuary city for the unborn." The ordinance declares abortion to be "a murderous act of violence that purposefully and knowingly terminates a human life," and it outlaws abortion "at all times and at all stages of pregnancy." The only exception is for abortions performed "in response to a life-threatening physical condition aggravated by, caused by, or arising from a pregnancy" that "places the woman in danger of death or a serious risk of substantial impairment of a major bodily function unless an abortion is performed." The Hayes Center ordinance also declares abortion-inducing drugs to be contraband.

The city of Blue Hill, Nebraska followed suit and enacted a similar ordinance outlawing abortion on April 13, 2021.

Nebraska Governor Pete Ricketts, (R) has praised Hayes Center for its actions to outlaw abortion, issuing a statement that: "Nebraska is a pro-life state, and communities are working to recognize and protect innocent life in a variety of ways. The Biden-Harris Administration is pushing a radical, pro-abortion agenda, and Nebraska must do everything we can to stand against the abortion lobby.”

== Demographics ==
Historical population
Census	Pop.	Note	%±
1930	229		—
1940	314		37.1%
1950	361		15.0%
1960	283		−21.6%
1970	237		−16.3%
1980	231		−2.5%
1990	259		12.1%
2000	240		−7.3%
2010	214		−10.8%
2020	224		4.7%
U.S. Decennial Census

=== 2010 census ===
At the 2010 census there were 214 people, 101 households, and 60 families in the village. The population density was 792.6 inhabitants per square mile (306.0/km^{2}). There were 122 housing units at an average density of 451.9 per square mile (174.5/km^{2}). The racial makeup of the village was 95.3% White, 0.5% Asian, and 4.2% from other races. Hispanic or Latino of any race were 9.3%.

Of the 101 households 26.7% had children under the age of 18 living with them, 50.5% were married couples living together, 6.9% had a female householder with no husband present, 2.0% had a male householder with no wife present, and 40.6% were non-families. 39.6% of households were one person and 22.8% were one person aged 65 or older. The average household size was 2.12 and the average family size was 2.83.

The median age in the village was 46.8 years. 23.4% of residents were under the age of 18; 5.5% were between the ages of 18 and 24; 18.3% were from 25 to 44; 27.5% were from 45 to 64; and 25.2% were 65 or older. The gender makeup of the village was 50.9% male and 49.1% female.

=== 2000 census ===
At the 2000 census there were 240 people, 106 households, and 69 families in the village. The population density was 929.9 inhabitants per square mile (359.0/km^{2}). There were 125 housing units at an average density of 484.3 per square mile (187.0/km^{2}). The racial makup of the village was 91.67% White, 0.42% Asian, 7.50% from other races, and 0.42% from two or more races. Hispanic or Latino of any race were 10.83%.

Of the 106 households 21.7% had children under the age of 18 living with them, 56.6% were married couples living together, 5.7% had a female householder with no husband present, and 34.0% were non-families. 34.0% of households were one person and 18.9% were one person aged 65 or older. The average household size was 2.26 and the average family size was 2.91.

The age distribution was 22.1% under the age of 18, 6.7% from 18 to 24, 16.7% from 25 to 44, 30.0% from 45 to 64, and 24.6% 65 or older. The median age was 48 years. For every 100 females, there were 86.0 males. For every 100 females age 18 and over, there were 90.8 males.

As of 2000 the median income for a household in the village was $25,114, and the median family income was $27,750. Males had a median income of $17,083 versus $20,417 for females. The per capita income for the village was $12,308. About 18.7% of families and 29.9% of the population were below the poverty line, including 54.7% of those under the age of eighteen and 13.7% of those sixty five or over.

== Geography ==
According to the United States Census Bureau, the village has a total area of 0.27 square miles (0.70 km^{2}), all land.

=== Climate ===
Climate data for Hayes Center 1NW, Nebraska (1991–2020 normals, extremes 1905–present)
Month	Jan	Feb	Mar	Apr	May	Jun	Jul	Aug	Sep	Oct	Nov	Dec	Year
Record high °F (°C)	76 (24)	80 (27)	96 (36)	97 (36)	101 (38)	110 (43)	114 (46)	111 (44)	105 (41)	96 (36)	85 (29)	78 (26)	114 (46)
Mean maximum °F (°C)	63.1 (17.3)	67.7 (19.8)	78.4 (25.8)	85.6 (29.8)	91.0 (32.8)	97.9 (36.6)	101.9 (38.8)	99.2 (37.3)	95.4 (35.2)	87.7 (30.9)	74.2 (23.4)	64.2 (17.9)	102.9 (39.4)
Mean daily maximum °F (°C)	39.8 (4.3)	42.8 (6.0)	53.9 (12.2)	62.2 (16.8)	71.7 (22.1)	83.1 (28.4)	89.1 (31.7)	86.9 (30.5)	79.2 (26.2)	65.6 (18.7)	51.9 (11.1)	41.1 (5.1)	63.9 (17.7)
Daily mean °F (°C)	27.3 (−2.6)	29.8 (−1.2)	39.5 (4.2)	47.9 (8.8)	58.2 (14.6)	69.3 (20.7)	74.9 (23.8)	72.9 (22.7)	64.3 (17.9)	51.0 (10.6)	38.3 (3.5)	28.8 (−1.8)	50.2 (10.1)
Mean daily minimum °F (°C)	14.8 (−9.6)	16.9 (−8.4)	25.1 (−3.8)	33.6 (0.9)	44.6 (7.0)	55.5 (13.1)	60.8 (16.0)	58.9 (14.9)	49.5 (9.7)	36.5 (2.5)	24.7 (−4.1)	16.5 (−8.6)	36.4 (2.4)
Mean minimum °F (°C)	−4.0 (−20.0)	−0.2 (−17.9)	8.4 (−13.1)	21.0 (−6.1)	32.2 (0.1)	45.0 (7.2)	52.9 (11.6)	50.7 (10.4)	36.8 (2.7)	21.4 (−5.9)	8.6 (−13.0)	−1.0 (−18.3)	−8.9 (−22.7)
Record low °F (°C)	−30 (−34)	−25 (−32)	−18 (−28)	2 (−17)	18 (−8)	34 (1)	41 (5)	34 (1)	22 (−6)	2 (−17)	−12 (−24)	−30 (−34)	−30 (−34)
Average precipitation inches (mm)	0.38 (9.7)	0.53 (13)	1.13 (29)	2.09 (53)	3.56 (90)	3.27 (83)	3.26 (83)	2.82 (72)	1.71 (43)	1.67 (42)	0.61 (15)	0.48 (12)	21.51 (546)
Average snowfall inches (cm)	5.1 (13)	6.3 (16)	4.2 (11)	3.7 (9.4)	0.2 (0.51)	0.0 (0.0)	0.0 (0.0)	0.0 (0.0)	0.1 (0.25)	2.2 (5.6)	3.5 (8.9)	4.9 (12)	30.2 (77)
Average precipitation days (≥ 0.01 in)	3.4	4.6	5.9	8.1	10.5	9.4	8.9	7.3	5.7	6.1	3.7	3.6	77.2
Average snowy days (≥ 0.1 in)	2.7	3.4	2.5	1.5	0.2	0.0	0.0	0.0	0.1	0.9	1.8	3.0	16.1
Source: NOAA

== Television ==
Hayes Center is the city of license for TV station KWNB, a satellite of Kearney, Nebraska, ABC affiliate KHGI-TV. The KWNB broadcast tower is located north of Hayes Center.

== See also ==
- List of municipalities in Nebraska
