= Culbertson, Nebraska =

Village in Nebraska, U.S.

- Village
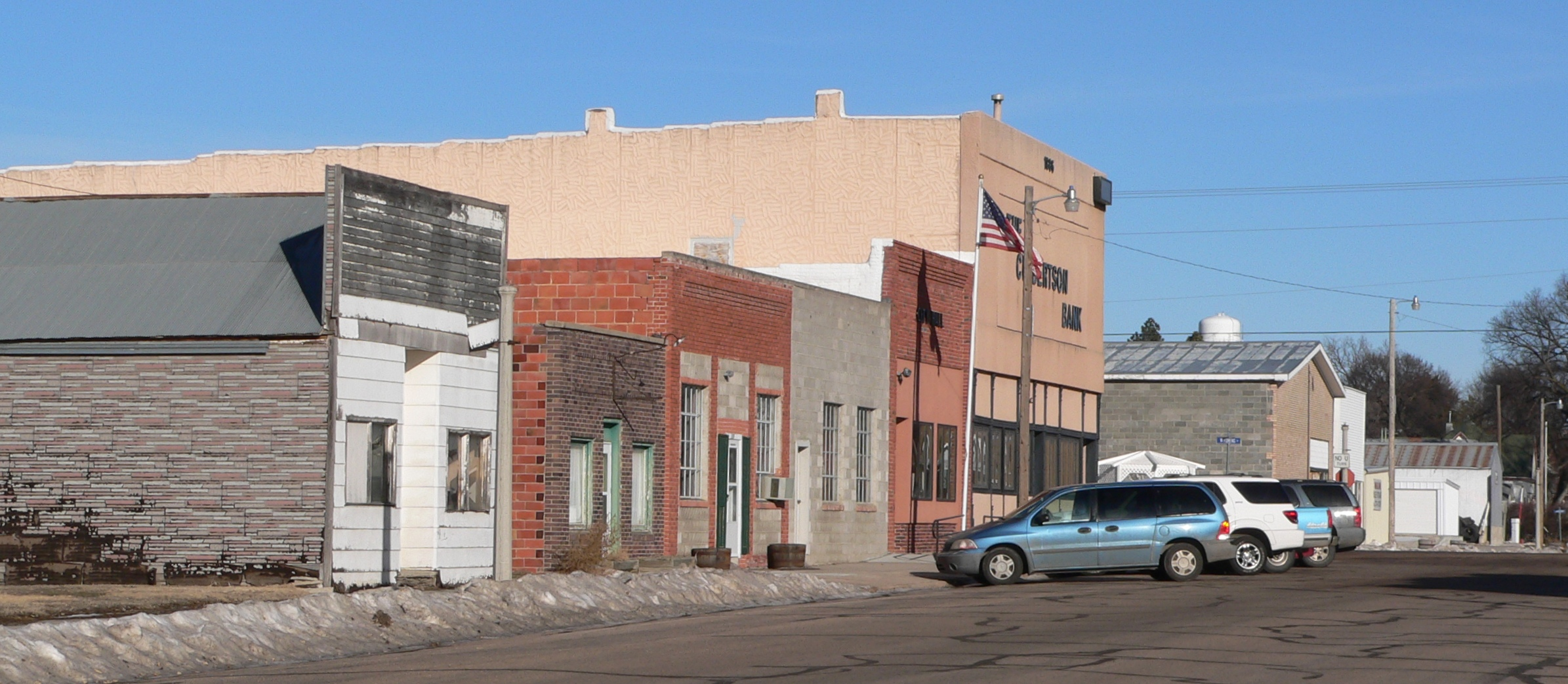
- Downtown Culbertson: 300 block of Taylor Ave

- Location of Culbertson, Nebraska
- Coordinates: 40°13′41″N 100°50′23″W
- Country: United States
- State: Nebraska
- County: Hitchcock

Area
  - Total: 0.84 sq mi (2.17 km^{2})
  - Land: 0.84 sq mi (2.17 km^{2})
  - Water: 0 sq mi (0.00 km^{2})
- Elevation: 2,599 ft (792 m)

Population (2020)
  - Total: 534
  - Density: 637.8/sq mi (246.26/km^{2})
- Time zone: UTC-6 (Central (CST))
  - Summer (DST): UTC-5 (CDT)
- ZIP code: 69024
- Area code: 308
- FIPS code: 31-11615
- GNIS feature ID: 2398657

Culbertson is a village in Hitchcock County, Nebraska, United States. The population was 534 at the 2020 census.

== History ==
Culbertson was founded in 1873 and served as the first county seat of Hitchcock County. It was named in honor of Alexander Culbertson, an Indian agent. The village of Culberton was incorporated in 1885.

== Geography ==
According to the United States Census Bureau, the village has a total area of 0.84 square miles (2.18 km^{2}), all land.

=== Climate ===
Climate data for Culbertson, Nebraska (1991–2020 normals, extremes 1889–present)
Month	Jan	Feb	Mar	Apr	May	Jun	Jul	Aug	Sep	Oct	Nov	Dec	Year
Record high °F (°C)	77 (25)	80 (27)	97 (36)	101 (38)	103 (39)	112 (44)	113 (45)	112 (44)	106 (41)	100 (38)	85 (29)	81 (27)	113 (45)
Mean daily maximum °F (°C)	41.3 (5.2)	44.8 (7.1)	56.3 (13.5)	65.0 (18.3)	74.5 (23.6)	86.1 (30.1)	91.6 (33.1)	89.4 (31.9)	81.8 (27.7)	67.8 (19.9)	53.6 (12.0)	42.4 (5.8)	66.2 (19.0)
Daily mean °F (°C)	27.7 (−2.4)	30.6 (−0.8)	40.6 (4.8)	49.6 (9.8)	60.1 (15.6)	71.5 (21.9)	77.0 (25.0)	74.9 (23.8)	66.0 (18.9)	51.9 (11.1)	38.6 (3.7)	28.9 (−1.7)	51.4 (10.8)
Mean daily minimum °F (°C)	14.0 (−10.0)	16.5 (−8.6)	25.0 (−3.9)	34.1 (1.2)	45.7 (7.6)	56.8 (13.8)	62.5 (16.9)	60.4 (15.8)	50.2 (10.1)	36.0 (2.2)	23.5 (−4.7)	15.3 (−9.3)	36.7 (2.6)
Record low °F (°C)	−30 (−34)	−38 (−39)	−23 (−31)	−4 (−20)	21 (−6)	32 (0)	38 (3)	35 (2)	20 (−7)	2 (−17)	−16 (−27)	−34 (−37)	−38 (−39)
Average precipitation inches (mm)	0.36 (9.1)	0.57 (14)	1.20 (30)	2.35 (60)	3.04 (77)	3.38 (86)	3.52 (89)	3.43 (87)	1.62 (41)	1.82 (46)	0.73 (19)	0.50 (13)	22.52 (572)
Average snowfall inches (cm)	4.1 (10)	5.1 (13)	3.8 (9.7)	2.7 (6.9)	0.2 (0.51)	0.0 (0.0)	0.0 (0.0)	0.0 (0.0)	0.0 (0.0)	1.5 (3.8)	3.5 (8.9)	5.6 (14)	26.5 (67)
Average precipitation days (≥ 0.01 in)	2.9	4.5	5.6	7.9	10.2	9.0	9.4	7.7	6.1	6.0	3.9	3.5	76.7
Average snowy days (≥ 0.1 in)	2.1	3.1	1.7	1.1	0.1	0.0	0.0	0.0	0.0	0.6	1.5	2.7	12.9
Source: NOAA

== Demographics ==
Historical population
Census	Pop.	Note	%±
1880	108		—
1890	460		325.9%
1900	422		−8.3%
1910	580		37.4%
1920	686		18.3%
1930	820		19.5%
1940	815		−0.6%
1950	770		−5.5%
1960	803		4.3%
1970	801		−0.2%
1980	767		−4.2%
1990	795		3.7%
2000	594		−25.3%
2010	595		0.2%
2020	534		−10.3%
U.S. Decennial Census

=== 2010 census ===
As of the census of 2010, there were 595 people, 257 households, and 174 families residing in the village. The population density was 708.3 inhabitants per square mile (273.5/km^{2}). There were 291 housing units at an average density of 346.4 per square mile (133.7/km^{2}). The racial makeup of the village was 97.5% White, 0.8% African American, 0.8% from other races, and 0.8% from two or more races. Hispanic or Latino of any race were 1.5% of the population.

There were 257 households, of which 28.8% had children under the age of 18 living with them, 55.3% were married couples living together, 9.7% had a female householder with no husband present, 2.7% had a male householder with no wife present, and 32.3% were non-families. 28.8% of all households were made up of individuals, and 11.7% had someone living alone who was 65 years of age or older. The average household size was 2.32 and the average family size was 2.78.

The median age in the village was 44.5 years. 25.2% of residents were under the age of 18; 4% were between the ages of 18 and 24; 21.5% were from 25 to 44; 30.2% were from 45 to 64; and 19.2% were 65 years of age or older. The gender makeup of the village was 46.7% male and 53.3% female.

=== 2000 census ===
As of the census of 2000, there were 594 people, 251 households, and 184 families residing in the village. The population density was 702.7 inhabitants per square mile (271.3/km^{2}). There were 290 housing units at an average density of 343.1 per square mile (132.5/km^{2}). The racial makeup of the village was 98.32% White, 0.17% African American, 0.34% Native American, and 1.18% from two or more races. Hispanic or Latino of any race were 2.02% of the population.

There were 251 households, out of which 29.1% had children under the age of 18 living with them, 62.5% were married couples living together, 9.2% had a female householder with no husband present, and 26.3% were non-families. 24.3% of all households were made up of individuals, and 14.7% had someone living alone who was 65 years of age or older. The average household size was 2.37 and the average family size was 2.81.

In the village, the population was spread out, with 23.2% under the age of 18, 6.2% from 18 to 24, 23.6% from 25 to 44, 24.7% from 45 to 64, and 22.2% who were 65 years of age or older. The median age was 43 years. For every 100 females, there were 86.2 males. For every 100 females age 18 and over, there were 86.1 males.

As of 2000 the median income for a household in the village was $32,727, and the median income for a family was $39,875. Males had a median income of $31,607 versus $17,212 for females. The per capita income for the village was $16,238. About 3.5% of families and 6.6% of the population were below the poverty line, including 7.1% of those under age 18 and 7.6% of those age 65 or over.

== Notable people ==
- Steve Brooks, jockey. Born in a nearby rural area.
- Carl L. Sackett, Former US Attorney for the District of Wyoming

== See also ==
- List of municipalities in Nebraska
