= Hayes County, Nebraska =

County in Nebraska, United States

- County
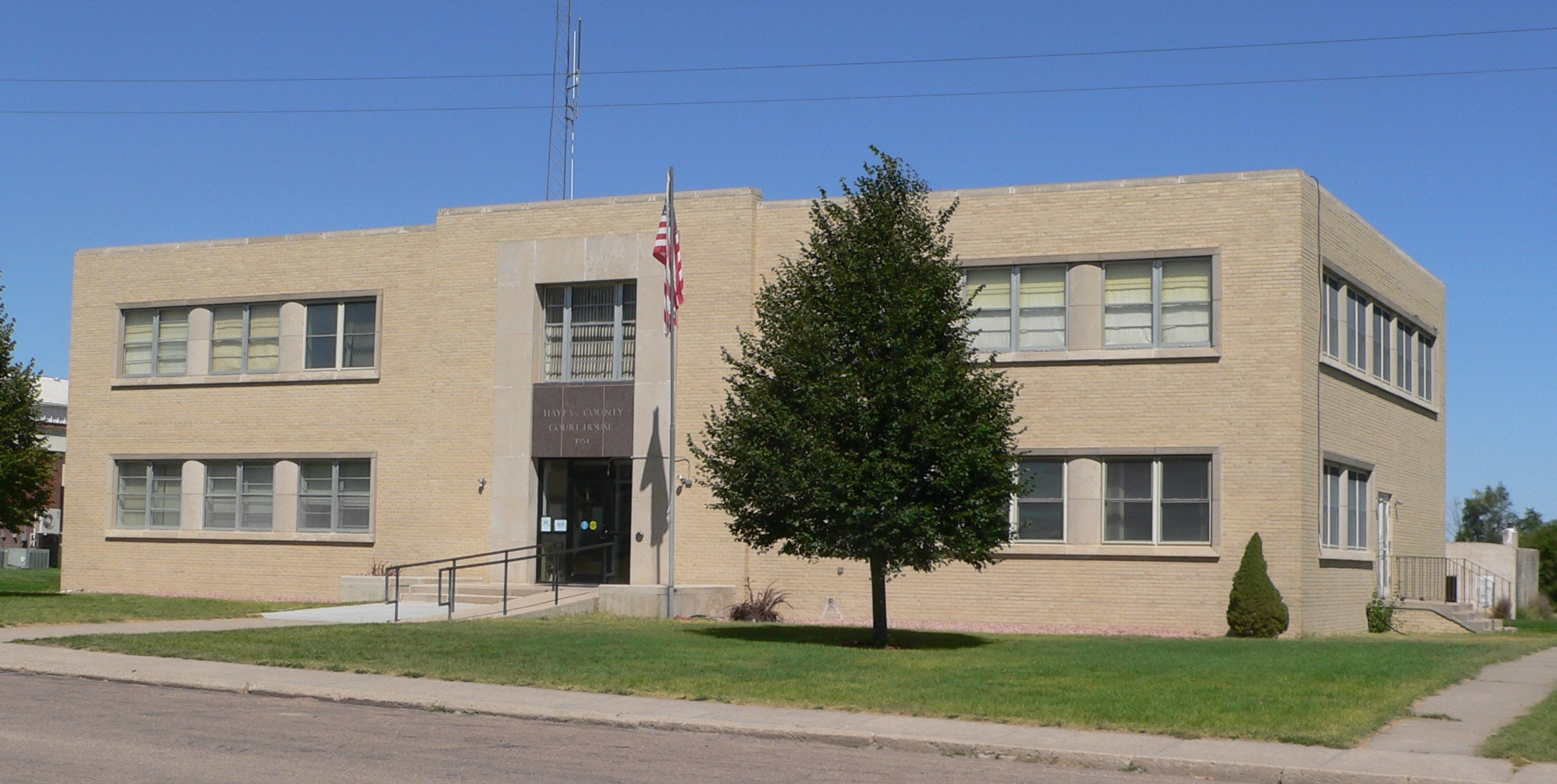
- The Hayes County Courthouse in Hayes Center

- Location within the U.S. state of Nebraska
- Coordinates: 40.537234°N 101.047963°W
- Country: United States
- State: Nebraska
- Created: February 19, 1877
- Organized: 1884
- Named for: Rutherford B. Hayes
- Seat: Hayes Center
- Largest village: Palisade

Area
  - Total: 713.282 sq mi (1,847.39 km^{2})
  - Land: 713.065 sq mi (1,846.83 km^{2})
  - Water: 0.217 sq mi (0.56 km^{2}) 0.03%

Population (2020)
  - Total: 856
  - Estimate (2025): 821 ▼
  - Density: 1.20/sq mi (0.463/km^{2})
- Time zone: UTC−6 (Central)
  - Summer (DST): UTC−5 (CDT)
- Area code: 308
- Congressional district: 3rd
- Website: hayescounty.ne.gov
- • Nebraska county number 43 • Nebraska license plate prefix 79

Hayes County is a county in the U.S. state of Nebraska. As of the 2020 census, the population was 856, and was estimated to be 821 in 2025. The county seat is Hayes Center and the largest village is Palisade.

In the Nebraska license plate system, Hayes County was represented by the prefix "79" (as it had the 79th-largest number of vehicles registered in the state when the license plate system was established in 1922).

== History ==
Hayes County was created on February 19, 1877 and was organized in 1884. It was named for Rutherford B. Hayes, the U.S. President at the time of the county's creation.

== Geography ==
According to the United States Census Bureau, the county has a total area of 713.282 square miles (1,847.39 km^{2}), of which 713.065 square miles (1,846.83 km^{2}) is land and 0.217 square miles (0.56 km^{2}) (0.03%) is water. It is the 37th-largest county in Nebraska by total area.

The terrain of Hayes County is hilly. The flattened hilltops are largely used for center pivot irrigation. Small creeks and streams drain the upper elevations; the largest is Red Willow Creek, which drains to Hugh Butler Lake just east of the SE corner of Hayes County, in Frontier County.

=== Major highways ===
- U.S. Highway 6
- Nebraska Highway 25
- Nebraska Highway 25A

=== Adjacent counties ===
- Frontier County – east
- Hitchcock County – south
- Dundy County – southwest
- Chase County – west
- Perkins County – northwest
- Lincoln County – north

== Demographics ==
Historical population
Census	Pop.	Note	%±
1880	119		—
1890	3,953		3,221.8%
1900	2,708		−31.5%
1910	3,011		11.2%
1920	3,327		10.5%
1930	3,603		8.3%
1940	2,958		−17.9%
1950	2,404		−18.7%
1960	1,919		−20.2%
1970	1,530		−20.3%
1980	1,356		−11.4%
1990	1,222		−9.9%
2000	1,068		−12.6%
2010	967		−9.5%
2020	856		−11.5%
2025 (est.)	821	▼	−4.1%
U.S. Decennial Census; 1790–1960 1900–1990; 1990–2000 2010–2020

=== 2020 census ===
As of the 2020 census, the county had a population of 856. The median age was 46.0 years. 22.8% of residents were under the age of 18 and 25.6% of residents were 65 years of age or older. For every 100 females there were 106.3 males, and for every 100 females age 18 and over there were 111.2 males age 18 and over.

The racial makeup of the county was 89.7% White, 0.0% Black or African American, 0.6% American Indian and Alaska Native, 0.2% Asian, 0.0% Native Hawaiian and Pacific Islander, 4.2% from some other race, and 5.3% from two or more races. Hispanic or Latino residents of any race comprised 7.4% of the population.

0.0% of residents lived in urban areas, while 100.0% lived in rural areas.

There were 354 households in the county, of which 28.2% had children under the age of 18 living with them and 14.4% had a female householder with no spouse or partner present. About 24.0% of all households were made up of individuals and 13.3% had someone living alone who was 65 years of age or older.

There were 442 housing units, of which 19.9% were vacant. Among occupied housing units, 69.2% were owner-occupied and 30.8% were renter-occupied. The homeowner vacancy rate was 2.3% and the rental vacancy rate was 5.9%.

=== 2000 census ===
As of the 2000 census, there were 1,068 people, 430 households, and 312 families in the county. The population density was 2 people per square mile (0.77 people/km^{2}). There were 526 housing units at an average density of 0.7 units per square mile (0.27/km^{2}). The racial makeup of the county was 97.19% White, 0.19% Black or African American, 0.28% Asian, 1.78% from other races, and 0.56% from two or more races. 2.53% of the population were Hispanic or Latino of any race.

There were 430 households, out of which 28.10% had children under the age of 18 living with them, 67.00% were married couples living together, 2.60% had a female householder with no husband present, and 27.40% were non-families. 26.50% of all households were made up of individuals, and 15.60% had someone living alone who was 65 years of age or older. The average household size was 2.48 and the average family size was 3.02.

The county population contains 26.60% under the age of 18, 5.50% from 18 to 24, 21.50% from 25 to 44, 26.50% from 45 to 64, and 19.90% who were 65 years of age or older. The median age was 42 years. For every 100 females there were 100.40 males. For every 100 females age 18 and over, there were 102.60 males.

The median income for a household in the county was $26,667, and the median income for a family was $31,125. Males had a median income of $19,211 versus $16,806 for females. The per capita income for the county was $14,099. About 14.60% of families and 18.40% of the population were below the poverty line, including 26.20% of those under age 18 and 12.90% of those age 65 or over.

== Communities ==
=== Villages ===
- Hamlet
- Hayes Center (county seat)
- Palisade (partial)

=== Unincorporated community ===
- Marengo

=== Townships ===
Hayes County has not been subdivided into townships, unlike most other Nebraska counties.

=== Former communities ===
- Carrico
- Eddy
- Elmer
- Estel
- Galena
- Highland
- Hope
- Hudson
- Marengo
- Norris
- Robert
- Strickland
- Sullivan
- Thornburgh
- White

== Politics ==
Hayes County voters have long been strongly Republican. In no national election since 1936 has the county selected the Democratic Party candidate. In 2024, Donald Trump received 95.55% of the vote, the highest percentage ever for a Republican.

United States presidential election results for Hayes County, Nebraska
Year	Republican		Democratic		Third party(ies)	
Year	No.	%	No.	%	No.	%
1900	308	49.20%	284	45.37%	34	5.43%
1904	335	62.97%	110	20.68%	87	16.35%
1908	359	52.10%	277	40.20%	53	7.69%
1912	106	17.94%	189	31.98%	296	50.08%
1916	219	33.33%	382	58.14%	56	8.52%
1920	512	66.41%	207	26.85%	52	6.74%
1924	475	42.60%	288	25.83%	352	31.57%
1928	917	65.83%	440	31.59%	36	2.58%
1932	506	33.55%	962	63.79%	40	2.65%
1936	654	44.13%	818	55.20%	10	0.67%
1940	759	55.93%	598	44.07%	0	0.00%
1944	782	66.89%	387	33.11%	0	0.00%
1948	529	55.86%	418	44.14%	0	0.00%
1952	932	80.90%	220	19.10%	0	0.00%
1956	726	70.01%	311	29.99%	0	0.00%
1960	699	71.33%	281	28.67%	0	0.00%
1964	503	58.15%	362	41.85%	0	0.00%
1968	496	71.26%	127	18.25%	73	10.49%
1972	486	79.80%	123	20.20%	0	0.00%
1976	411	59.14%	267	38.42%	17	2.45%
1980	617	84.52%	82	11.23%	31	4.25%
1984	593	85.45%	101	14.55%	0	0.00%
1988	512	75.07%	160	23.46%	10	1.47%
1992	362	55.35%	85	13.00%	207	31.65%
1996	439	77.02%	87	15.26%	44	7.72%
2000	486	85.11%	66	11.56%	19	3.33%
2004	524	87.63%	66	11.04%	8	1.34%
2008	461	83.36%	85	15.37%	7	1.27%
2012	476	88.31%	51	9.46%	12	2.23%
2016	472	91.83%	30	5.84%	12	2.33%
2020	494	92.16%	34	6.34%	8	1.49%
2024	472	95.55%	19	3.85%	3	0.61%

== See also ==
- National Register of Historic Places listings in Hayes County, Nebraska
