= Hitchcock County, Nebraska =

County in Nebraska, United States

- County
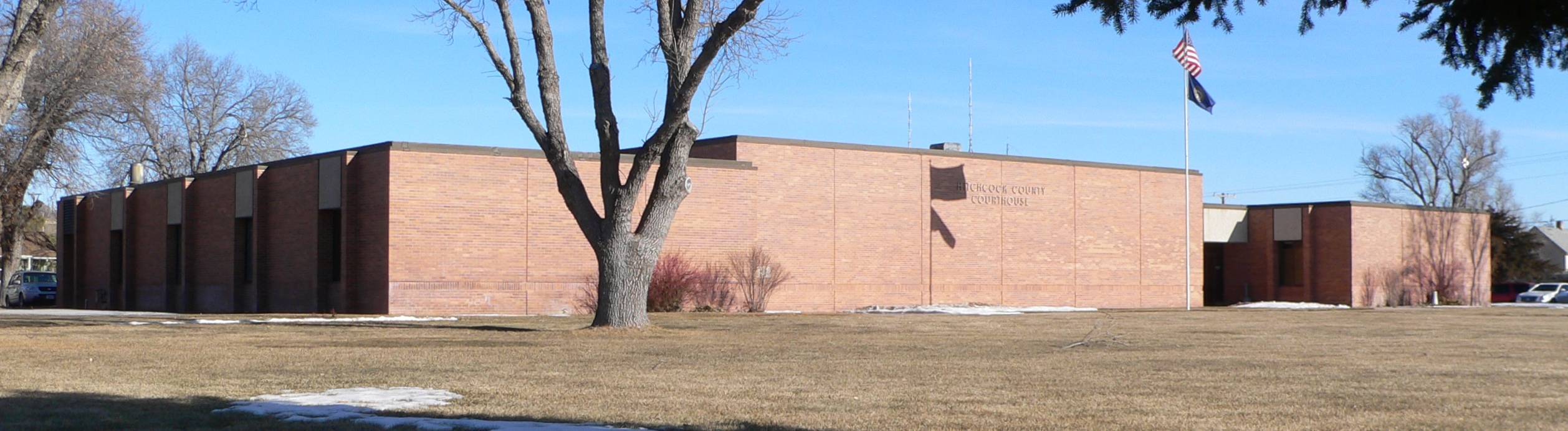
- Hitchcock County Courthouse in Trenton

- Location within the U.S. state of Nebraska
- Coordinates: 40°11′N 101°02′W
- Country: United States
- State: Nebraska
- Founded: 1873
- Named for: Phineas Hitchcock
- Seat: Trenton
- Largest village: Culbertson

Area
  - Total: 718 sq mi (1,860 km^{2})
  - Land: 710 sq mi (1,800 km^{2})
  - Water: 8.5 sq mi (22 km^{2}) 1.2%

Population (2020)
  - Total: 2,616
  - Estimate (2025): 2,467 ▼
  - Density: 4/sq mi (1.5/km^{2})
- Time zone: UTC−6 (Central)
  - Summer (DST): UTC−5 (CDT)
- Congressional district: 3rd
- Website: www.hitchcockcounty.ne.gov

Hitchcock County is a county in the U.S. state of Nebraska. As of the 2020 United States census, the population was 2,616. Its county seat is Trenton.

In the Nebraska license plate system, Hitchcock County is represented by the prefix 67 (it had the sixty-seventh-largest number of vehicles registered in the county when the license plate system was established in 1922).

== History ==
Hitchcock County was formed in 1873. It was named for US Senator Phineas Warren Hitchcock.

The Massacre Canyon battle between Sioux and Pawnee took place on August 5, 1873, at a spot three miles east of Trenton.

== Geography ==
The terrain of Hitchcock County consists of rolling low hills. The flattened hilltops are used for agriculture; mostly dry farming with some center pivot irrigation. The Republican River flows eastward through the central part of the county. The county has a total area of 718 square miles (1,860 km^{2}), of which 710 square miles (1,800 km^{2}) is land and 8.5 square miles (22 km^{2}) (1.2%) is water.

The eastern two-thirds of the state of Nebraska observes Central Time; the western portion of the state observes Mountain Time. Hitchcock County is the westernmost county to observe Central Time.

=== Lakes ===
- Swanson Lake: formed by a dam on the Republican River, between Stratton and Trenton.

=== Major highways ===
- U.S. Highway 6
- U.S. Highway 34
- Nebraska Highway 17
- Nebraska Highway 25
- Nebraska Highway 25A

=== Adjacent counties ===
- Red Willow County – east
- Rawlins County, Kansas – south
- Dundy County – west (Mountain Time border)
- Hayes County – north
- Frontier County –northeast

== Demographics ==
Historical population
Census	Pop.	Note	%±
1880	1,012		—
1890	5,799		473.0%
1900	4,409		−24.0%
1910	5,415		22.8%
1920	6,045		11.6%
1930	7,269		20.2%
1940	6,404		−11.9%
1950	5,867		−8.4%
1960	4,829		−17.7%
1970	4,051		−16.1%
1980	4,079		0.7%
1990	3,750		−8.1%
2000	3,111		−17.0%
2010	2,908		−6.5%
2020	2,616		−10.0%
2025 (est.)	2,467	▼	−5.7%
US Decennial Census; 1790-1960 1900-1990; 1990-2000 2010-2013

=== 2020 census ===
As of the 2020 census, the county had a population of 2,616. The median age was 47.4 years. 22.3% of residents were under the age of 18 and 26.9% of residents were 65 years of age or older. For every 100 females there were 104.1 males, and for every 100 females age 18 and over there were 98.7 males age 18 and over.

The racial makeup of the county was 95.5% White, 0.0% Black or African American, 0.0% American Indian and Alaska Native, 0.1% Asian, 0.2% Native Hawaiian and Pacific Islander, 0.8% from some other race, and 3.5% from two or more races. Hispanic or Latino residents of any race comprised 3.3% of the population.

0.0% of residents lived in urban areas, while 100.0% lived in rural areas.

There were 1,137 households in the county, of which 25.6% had children under the age of 18 living with them and 23.6% had a female householder with no spouse or partner present. About 33.8% of all households were made up of individuals and 17.3% had someone living alone who was 65 years of age or older.

There were 1,571 housing units, of which 27.6% were vacant. Among occupied housing units, 80.7% were owner-occupied and 19.3% were renter-occupied. The homeowner vacancy rate was 3.0% and the rental vacancy rate was 13.0%.

=== 2000 census ===
As of the 2000 United States census, there were 3,111 people, 1,287 households, and 899 families in the county. The population density was 4 people per square mile (1.5 people/km^{2}). There were 1,675 housing units at an average density of 2 units per square mile (0.77/km^{2}).

The racial makeup of the county was 98.36% White, 0.10% Black or African American, 0.29% Native American, 0.13% Asian, 0.29% from other races, and 0.84% from two or more races. 1.41% of the population were Hispanic or Latino of any race.

There were 1,287 households, out of which 28.00% had children under the age of 18 living with them, 61.10% were married couples living together, 6.40% had a female householder with no husband present, and 30.10% were non-families. 27.40% of all households were made up of individuals, and 15.50% had someone living alone who was 65 years of age or older. The average household size was 2.37 and the average family size was 2.89.

The county population contained 23.80% under the age of 18, 5.90% from 18 to 24, 22.60% from 25 to 44, 25.40% from 45 to 64, and 22.30% who were 65 years of age or older. The median age was 44 years. For every 100 females there were 95.00 males. For every 100 females age 18 and over, there were 92.60 males.

The median income for a household in the county was $28,287, and the median income for a family was $34,490. Males had a median income of $25,833 versus $18,879 for females. The per capita income for the county was $14,804. About 10.90% of families and 14.90% of the population were below the poverty line, including 22.90% of those under age 18 and 8.40% of those age 65 or over.

== Communities ==
=== Villages ===
- Culbertson
- Palisade (partial)
- Stratton
- Trenton (county seat)

=== Former communities ===
- Beverly
- Blackwood
- Cornell
- Dike
- Driftwood
- Meeker
- Poe
- Rill
- Rupert

== Politics ==
Hitchcock County is strongly Republican in presidential elections. Since 1900, the county has failed to back the Republican candidate in only five presidential elections, most recently in 1936 in the midst of Franklin D. Roosevelt's national landslide victory. Republicans also hold a voter registration advantage of 1,326 registered Republicans compared with just 262 registered Democrats in Hitchcock County as of 2021.

United States presidential election results for Hitchcock County, Nebraska
Year	Republican		Democratic		Third party(ies)	
Year	No.	%	No.	%	No.	%
1900	450	45.36%	528	53.23%	14	1.41%
1904	598	61.08%	166	16.96%	215	21.96%
1908	633	48.84%	632	48.77%	31	2.39%
1912	128	12.11%	471	44.56%	458	43.33%
1916	435	36.16%	733	60.93%	35	2.91%
1920	1,127	61.58%	615	33.61%	88	4.81%
1924	987	45.80%	633	29.37%	535	24.83%
1928	2,022	73.71%	698	25.45%	23	0.84%
1932	1,168	39.16%	1,772	59.40%	43	1.44%
1936	1,285	42.20%	1,738	57.08%	22	0.72%
1940	1,663	58.33%	1,188	41.67%	0	0.00%
1944	1,556	63.95%	877	36.05%	0	0.00%
1948	1,208	56.69%	923	43.31%	0	0.00%
1952	2,008	75.01%	669	24.99%	0	0.00%
1956	1,570	67.94%	741	32.06%	0	0.00%
1960	1,634	70.67%	678	29.33%	0	0.00%
1964	1,149	54.84%	946	45.16%	0	0.00%
1968	1,173	66.91%	387	22.08%	193	11.01%
1972	1,339	78.63%	364	21.37%	0	0.00%
1976	898	51.85%	786	45.38%	48	2.77%
1980	1,474	75.09%	329	16.76%	160	8.15%
1984	1,391	79.99%	341	19.61%	7	0.40%
1988	1,132	69.45%	480	29.45%	18	1.10%
1992	824	47.60%	359	20.74%	548	31.66%
1996	977	62.27%	409	26.07%	183	11.66%
2000	1,126	76.08%	312	21.08%	42	2.84%
2004	1,171	78.80%	296	19.92%	19	1.28%
2008	1,001	72.59%	346	25.09%	32	2.32%
2012	1,178	78.80%	274	18.33%	43	2.88%
2016	1,232	83.92%	161	10.97%	75	5.11%
2020	1,264	85.99%	175	11.90%	31	2.11%
2024	1,269	88.19%	152	10.56%	18	1.25%

== See also ==
- National Register of Historic Places listings in Hitchcock County, Nebraska
