= 2024 Elkhorn tornado =

2024 EF4 tornado in eastern Nebraska and Iowa

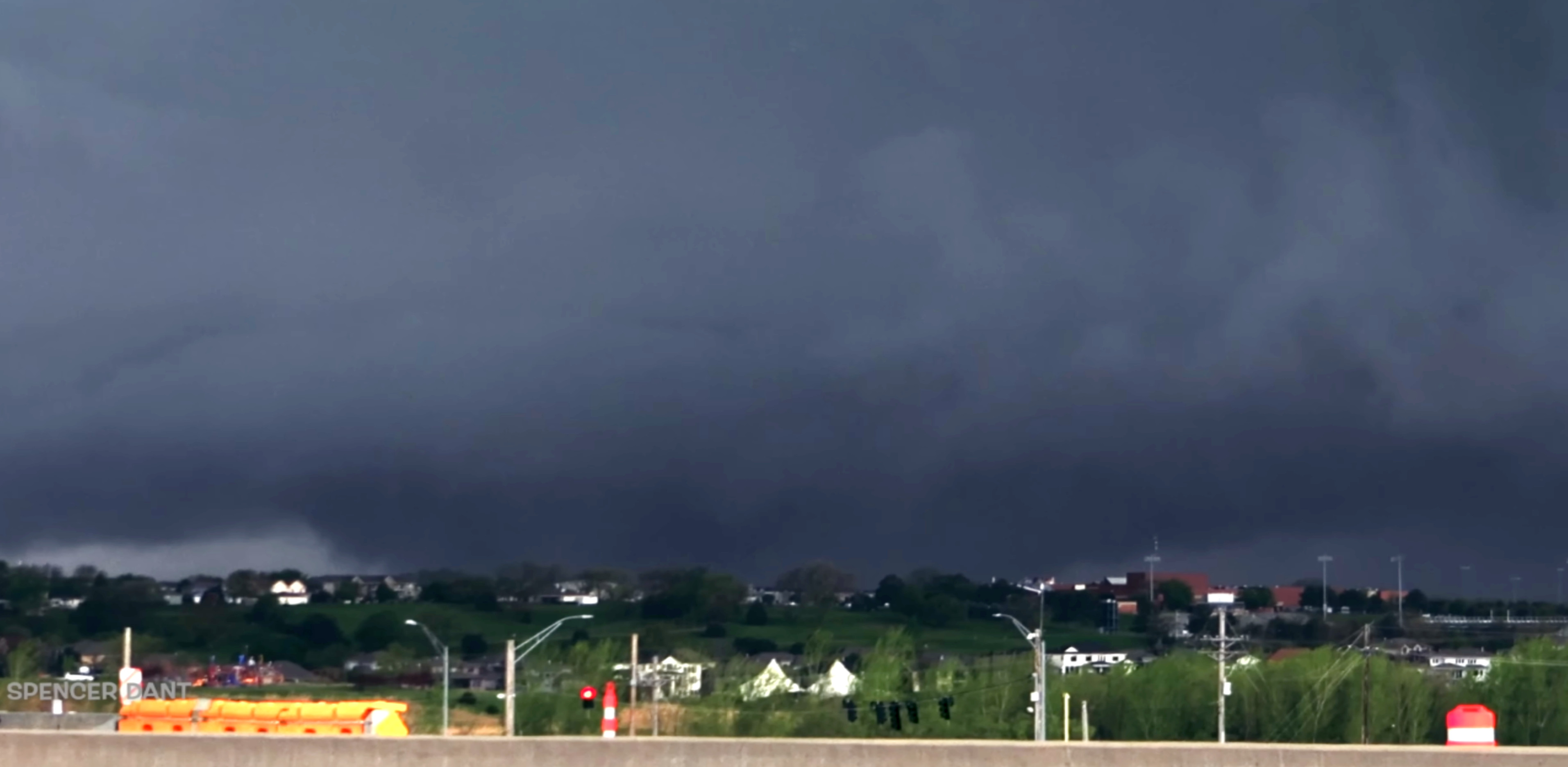
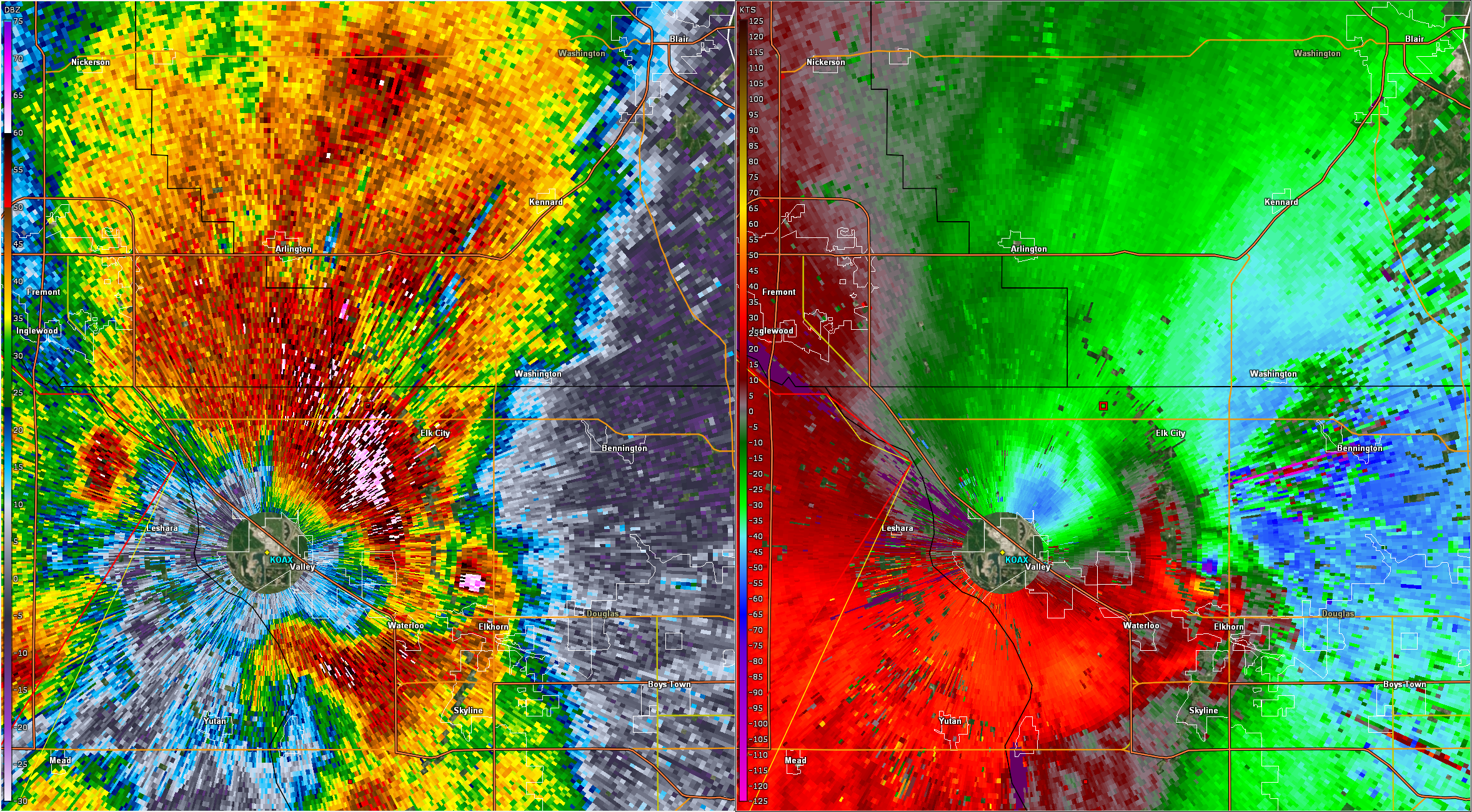
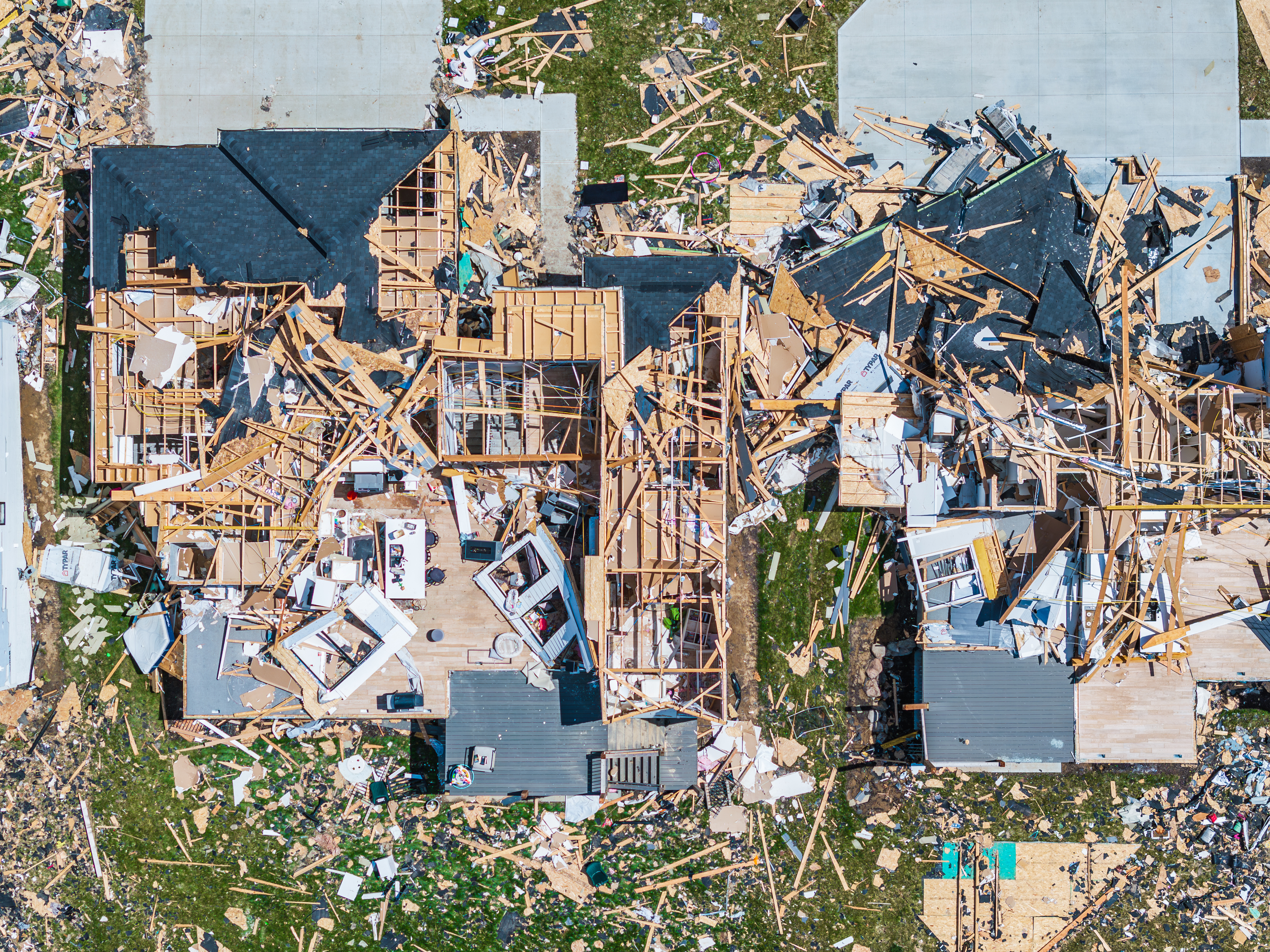
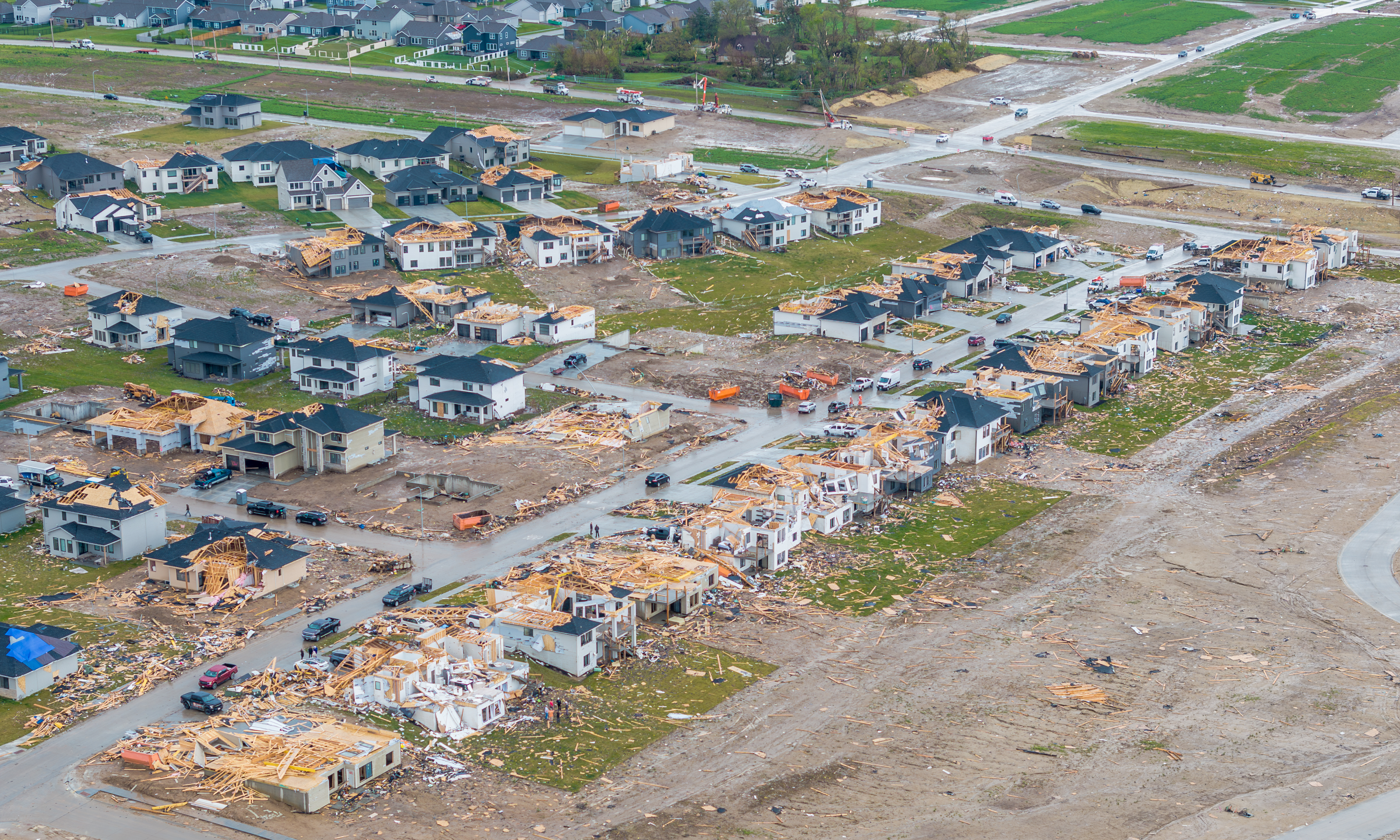
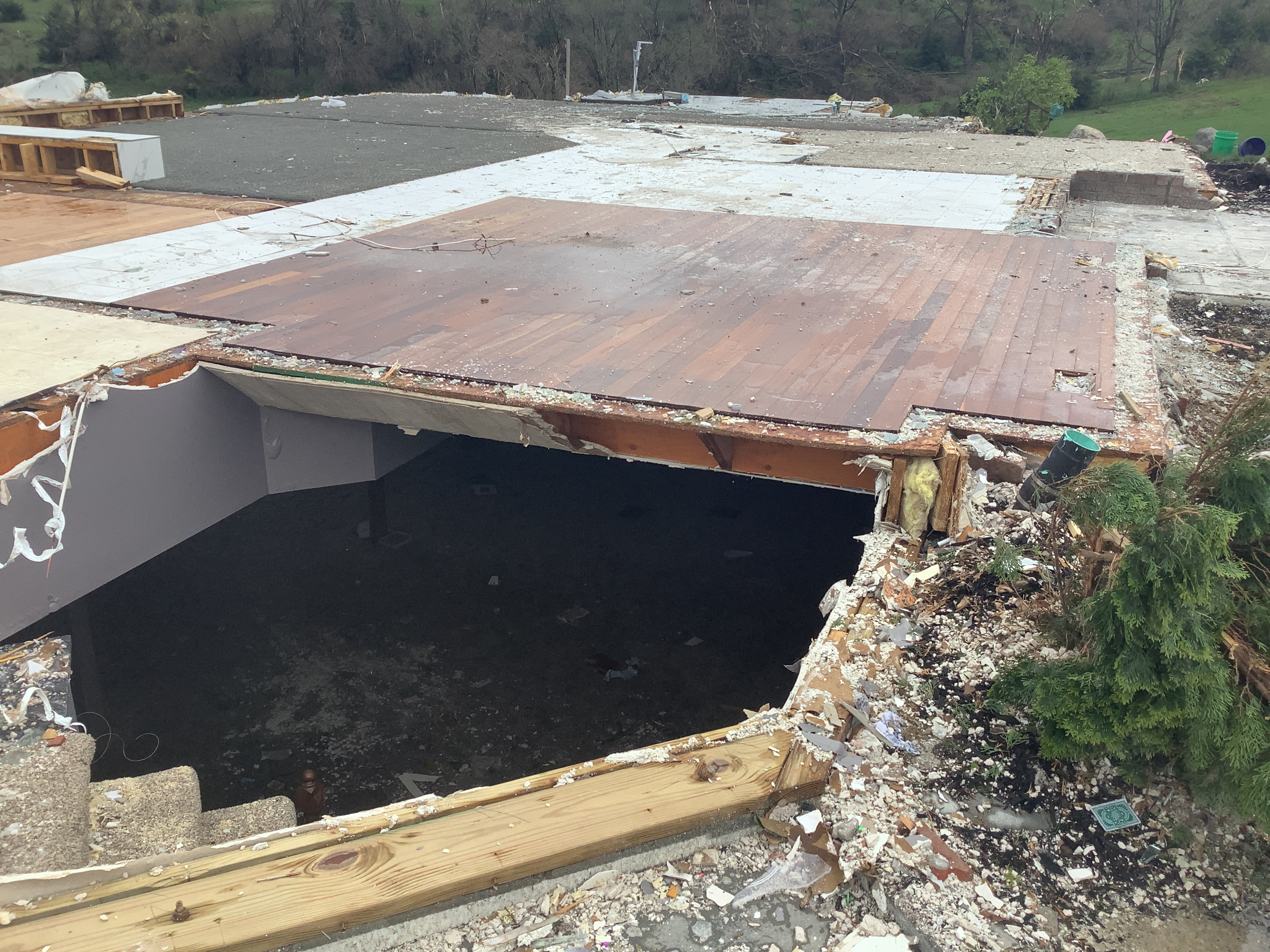
- Clockwise from Top: A photo of the EF4 tornado as it was producing significant damage in Elkhorn. Catastrophic damage to homes in the Nebraska community of Elkhorn following the tornado outbreak of April 25-28, 2024. A home that was destroyed at high-end EF3 intensity south of Blair, Nebraska. EF2 to low-end EF3 damage to homes along N 212th St on the northwest side of Elkhorn. Close range NEXRAD radar data of the EF4 tornado near peak intensity on April 26, 2024.

Meteorological history
- Formed: April 26, 2024, 3:30 p.m. CDT (UTC−05:00)
- Dissipated: April 26, 2024, 4:31 pm. CDT (UTC−05:00)
- Duration: 1 hour and 1 minute

EF4 tornado
- on the Enhanced Fujita scale
- Max width: 1,900 yards (1.1 mi; 1.7 km)
- Path length: 32.49 miles (52.29 km)
- Highest winds: 170 mph (270 km/h)

Overall effects
- Fatalities: 0
- Injuries: 4
- Damage: >$8 million (2024 USD)
- Areas affected: Northwestern Omaha metropolitan area; specifically in Douglas and Washington counties, Nebraska; and Harrison County, Iowa, United States.
- Part of the Tornado outbreak of April 25–28, 2024 and Tornadoes of 2024

On the afternoon of April 26, 2024, a large and violent tornado moved through the Omaha metropolitan area, striking the communities of Waterloo, Elkhorn, Bennington, and Blair in Nebraska, resulting in four injuries. The tornado was part of a destructive tornado outbreak that occurred across the Midwestern, Southern, and High Plains regions of the United States between April 25 and 28, and was the first of two violent tornadoes that occurred during the outbreak. The tornado reached peak intensity in the Omaha neighborhood of Elkhorn and south of the city of Blair, leading the National Weather Service in Omaha, Nebraska to assign a rating of low-end EF4 on the Enhanced Fujita scale, with maximum wind speeds estimated at 170 mph (270 km/h).

Initially rated as a high-end EF3, post-analysis revealed that the tornado was slightly stronger and was thus upgraded to EF4 in July 2024. As a result, this tornado was the first violent tornado of the 2024 season and the first of two EF4 tornadoes during the month of April, as well as being the first violent tornado in Nebraska since 2014, nearly a decade prior.

== Meteorological synopsis ==
A significant severe weather event was predicted to occur on the afternoon of April 26. The event was first forecasted to occur on April 20, when a 15% risk area was issued across much of the south-central United States by the Storm Prediction Center for April 26. By April 23, the 15% area had been expanded tremendously, covering areas from the eastern Great Plains into the mid-Mississippi Valley. On April 24, the 15% risk area transitioned into slight risk area that covered the same area with all severe weather hazards expected. With an enhanced risk of severe weather in place, the Storm Prediction issued a tornado watch for eastern Oklahoma on the morning of April 26. Several hours later, on the afternoon of April 26, another tornado watch was implemented for northeastern Nebraska, which included the possibility for "a couple of intense tornadoes."

Supercells moving through eastern Nebraska and western Iowa on April 26.

The supercell that produced the Elkhorn EF4 tornado initiated in Republic County, Kansas. It matured and continued northeast for a little over 35 miles (56 km), where the first tornado warning was issued for the supercell in Jefferson County, Nebraska; no tornado was documented at that time. The supercell continued further northeast for about 45 miles (72 km), where it then produced an intense tornado in northeastern Lincoln, Nebraska, the first tornado from the supercell. The tornado continued northeast for 8.55 miles (13.76 km), before lifting north-northeast of Waverly. The tornado was rated as a high-end EF3 on the Enhanced Fujita scale, with wind speeds estimated at 158 mph (254 km/h), reaching a peak width of 700 yards (640 m) along a 8.55-mile (13.76 km) path, remaining on the ground for 12 minutes. The supercell then produced three weak tornadoes near Greenwood and Ashland before producing the violent tornado that struck Elkhorn.

== Tornado summary ==
=== Douglas County ===
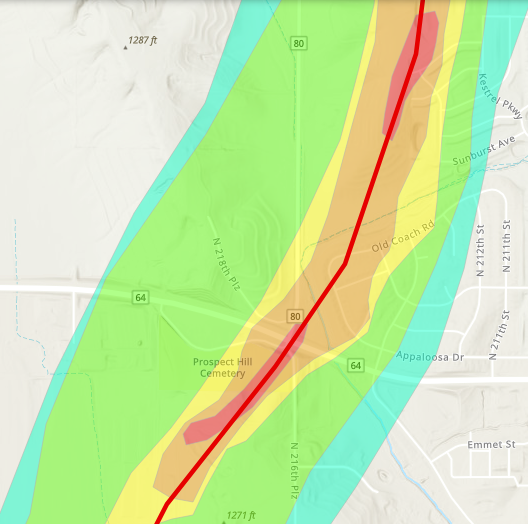
Track and intensity map of the tornado through Elkhorn. Key EF0 65–85 mph EF1 86–110 mph EF2 111–135 mph EF3 136–165 mph EF4 166–200 mph ⎯ Center of the tornado

The tornado first touched down at 3:30 pm CDT south of West Q Road near the Platte River and traveled northeastward, damaging trees and farmstead outbuildings at EF0-EF1 intensity. As the tornado crossed the intersection of Grover Street and South 252nd Street, it strengthened to mid-EF2 strength, where it ripped the roof off a home. The tornado maintained EF2 strength as it crossed N-92, near the intersection of US 275, where it damaged numerous homes and hit an acreage. In the acreage, multiple center pivots were overturned. A grain silo also sustained EF2 damage in this area. Crossing US 275, the tornado struck several more acreages and damaged multiple homes and outbuildings at EF1 to EF2 intensity; The first of two tornado emergencies was issued for this tornado at that time as well; it would remain under this tag for essentially the rest of its existence. The tornado then weakened as it crossed 234th Street and L-28B, where it damaged a horse farm and a home at EF1 intensity. As the tornado crossed the Elkhorn River southeast of Waterloo, it caused EF0 to EF1 damage to several trees and other center pivots.

==== Elkhorn and Bennington ====
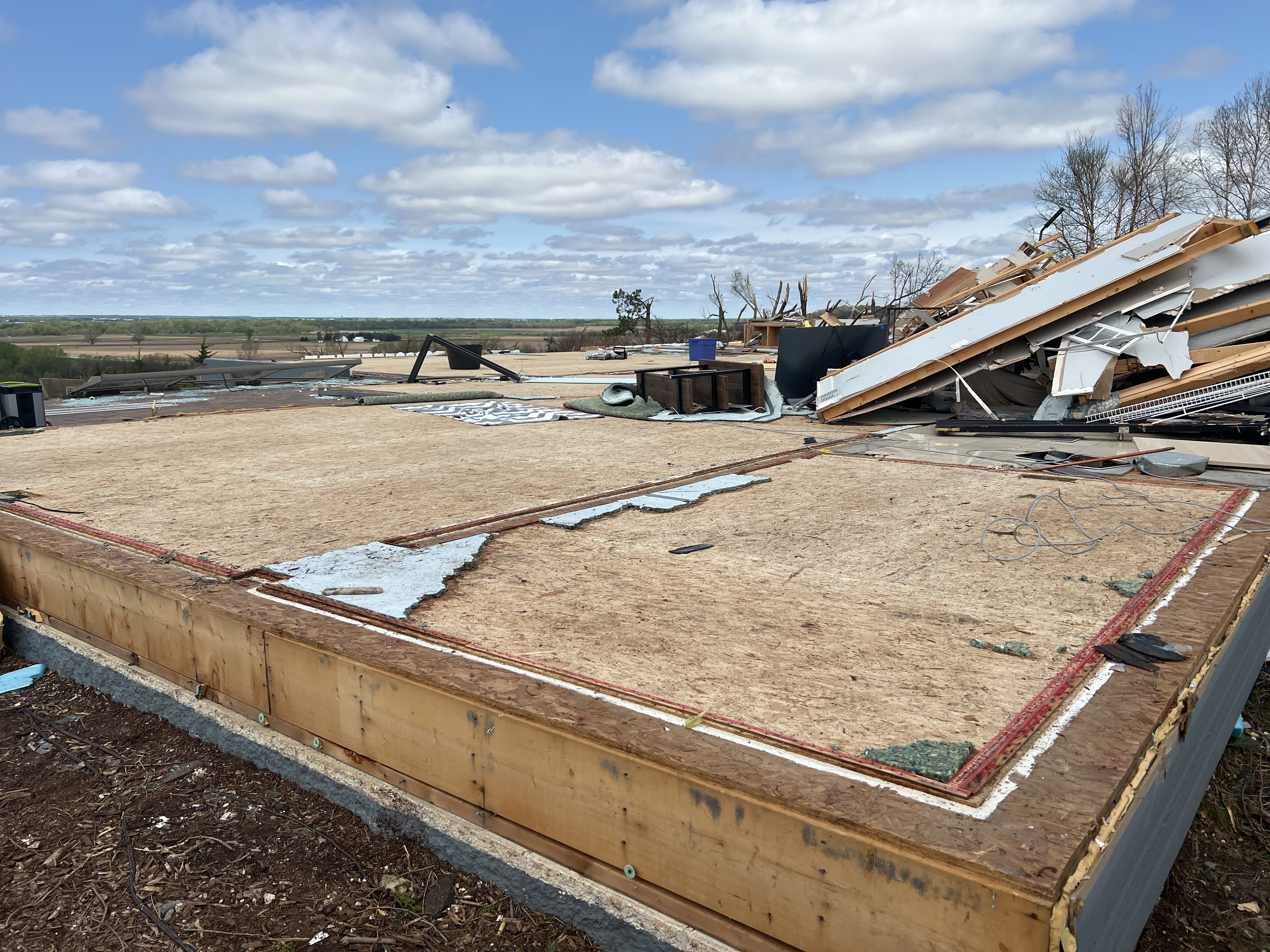
Low-end EF4 damage to a mansion-style home along N 216th St in western Elkhorn.

As the tornado entered the Omaha neighborhood of Elkhorn around the intersection of 216th Street and N-64, it abruptly became violent, leveling a home. In the initial final report on the tornado released in mid-July 2024, this damage was rated high-end EF3 with winds of 160 mph (260 km/h) due to the walls of the structure not being particularly well-anchored. However, a reanalysis of this location later in the month revealed that a substantial portion of the home had been swept away and nearby trees were snapped with some debarking noted. Based on this, the damage rating at this location was upgraded to low-end EF4 with winds of 170 mph (270 km/h). It was also concluded that the location may have been hit by a sub-vortex with a slightly longer vortex residence time noted here. The tornado also collapsed metal light poles near the Prospect Hill Cemetery, where several headstones were damaged. The tornado then damaged the Heritage Nursery Landscaping business before moving into the Ramblewood subdivision, where it was approximately 0.7 mi (1.1 km) in width.

The tornado had weakened slightly but remained at high-end EF3 intensity as it struck the subdivision, where it damaged or destroyed numerous homes with winds up to 155 mph (249 km/h). Many homes were left almost completely flattened, and other homes collapsed after being shifted off their foundations. Continuing northeast, the tornado again became violent as it struck multiple homes along Fowler Street and Larimore Avenue. Two homes along Larimore Avenue that were newly built and newly anchored with nails and anchor bolts to a sill plate were leveled and swept away. Damage at these two homes was initially rated mid-range EF3 but was upped to low-end EF4 in the reanalysis. Other homes in this area were also leveled or had some or all of their exterior walls knocked down, a metal building system was heavily damaged, and some trees were snapped. The tornado then crossed Fort Street and struck another subdivision at EF3 strength, damaging several new homes, including one home that had all of its exterior walls knocked down and a newly built home that was leveled. Exiting the subdivision, the tornado grew to almost a mile-wide and crossed N-31, snapped numerous wooden and steel power poles and trees.

The tornado then narrowed to a half-mile wide and weakened to EF1 strength as it continued northeastward, snapping trees and damaging the roofs of outbuildings and homes. The tornado then reached EF2 intensity again southwest of Bennington unroofing homes and snapping trees in a residential area. Continuing northeastward, the tornado intensified further to high-end EF2 intensity as it struck a development along Newport Landing Lake to the west of Bennington. Homes in this area suffered extensive damage with roofs removed and exterior walls knocked down, and power poles and trees were snapped. After crossing the lake and N-36, the tornado continued to snap trees and power lines and damage outbuildings at EF1 intensity before moving into Washington County.

=== Washington County ===
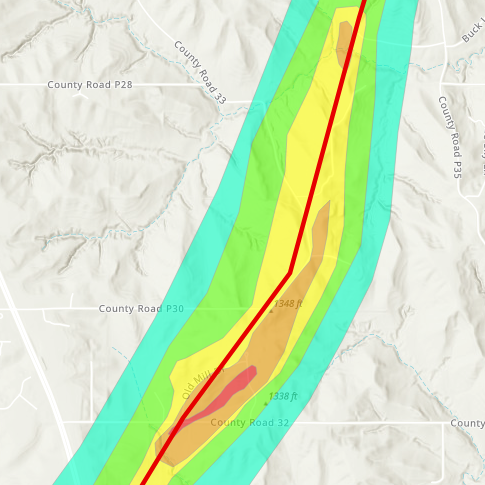
Track and intensity map of the tornado south of Blair. Key EF0 65–85 mph EF1 86–110 mph EF2 111–135 mph EF3 136–165 mph EF4 166–200 mph ⎯ Center of the tornado

The tornado regained EF2 strength upon entering the county, causing moderate to heavy damage to homes and damaging or destroying outbuildings well east of Washington. It further strengthened and briefly reached low-end EF3 intensity near the intersection of County Road 29 and County Road 40, where an unanchored home was shifted entirely off its foundation and destroyed with nearby trees snapped and debarked. A flatbed and horse-trailers on the property were rolled or lofted, and the machine shop and horse barns were destroyed, killing at least one horse and injuring several others. Another unanchored home was shifted off its foundation and partially collapsed, power poles were snapped, and more trees were uprooted or snapped. As it approached N-133, the tornado continued to cause mid-range to high-end EF2 damage, ripping the roofs off and knocking down the exterior walls of homes, damaging or destroying outbuildings, damaging at least one mobile home, snapping wooden power poles, and snapping or uprooting numerous trees. One home along County Road 36 was left with only interior walls standing, and the damage there was rated mid-range EF3. The tornado's width ranged from one-third to one-half-mile wide along this portion of its path.

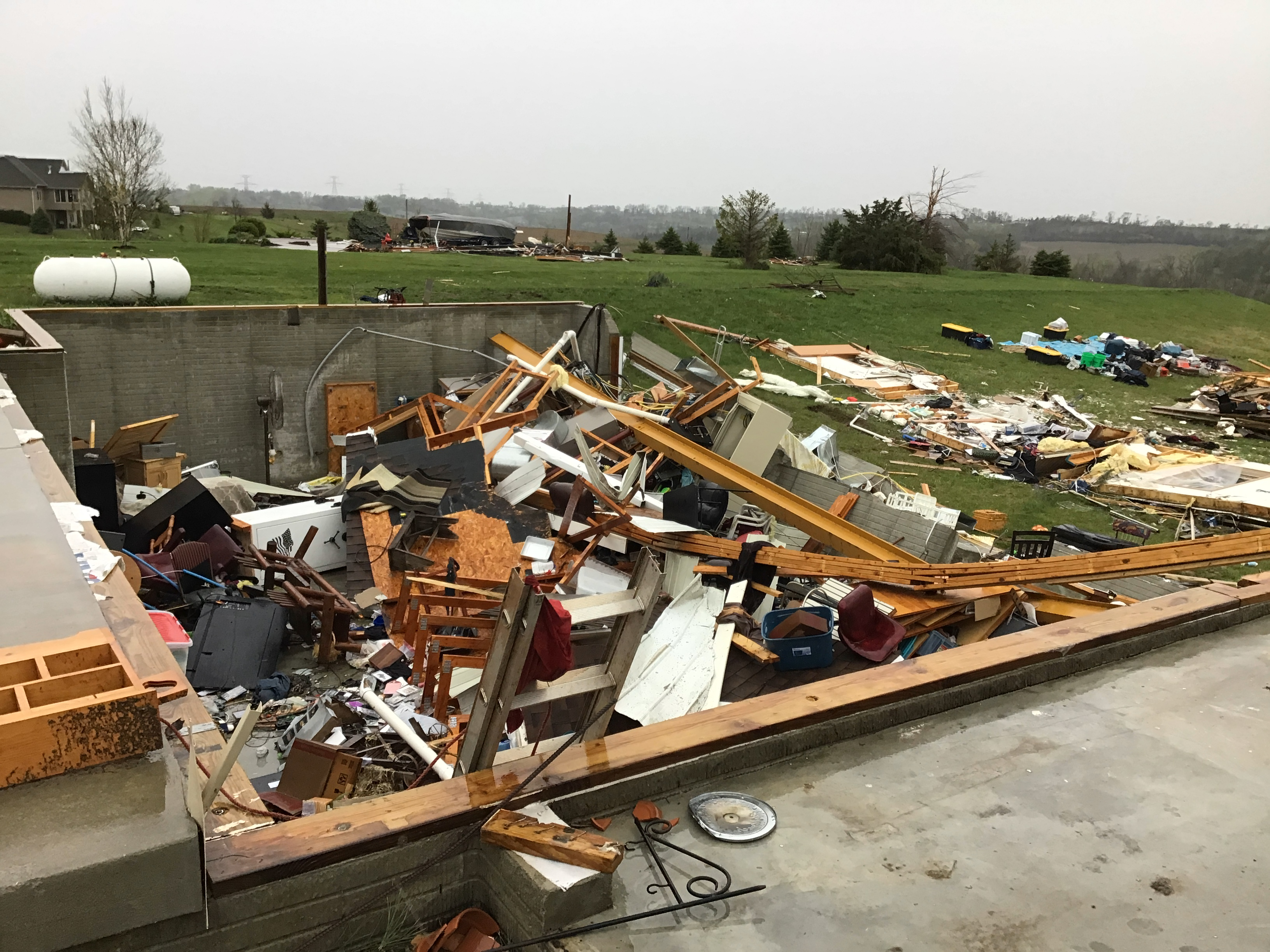
A home destroyed at low-end EF4 intensity south of Blair.

After crossing N-133, the tornado rapidly intensified and became violent for the third time as it impacted small neighborhoods to the south of Blair. Several homes were completely destroyed, including some that were swept away. These homes were either unanchored or poorly anchored and the damage was rated high-end EF3 with winds of 165 mph (266 km/h). However, one of the swept-away homes received a low-end EF4 rating in the reanalysis. Other homes in the area were also unroofed with some or all of the exterior walls knocked down. Northeast of there, the tornado inflicted EF2 damage to homes before destroying another unanchored home at mid-range EF3 intensity and causing extensive tree damage. The tornado then weakened, causing EF0-EF1 damage to homes and trees as it approached US 75. EF2 damage occurred as the tornado crossed US 75, where an unanchored home was shifted off its foundation and leveled, other homes suffered minor to heavy roof damage, trees and power poles were snapped, and several 50 ft (15 m) tank cars at Cargill Plant were derailed.

=== Iowa and dissipation ===
The tornado then weakened again and crossed the Missouri River into Harrison County, Iowa, producing EF0 damage to trees as it moved northeastward. The tornado then crossed over US 30 and moved across bottom-land/agricultural areas at EF0-EF1 intensity, snapping or uprooting many trees and tipping over center pivots. The tornado then turned east-northeast and dissipated south of Modale at 4:31 pm CDT after being on the ground for 61 minutes, traveling 32.50 mi (52.30 km), and reaching a width of 1,900 yd (1,700 m). Four people were injured.

== Post-analysis upgrade ==
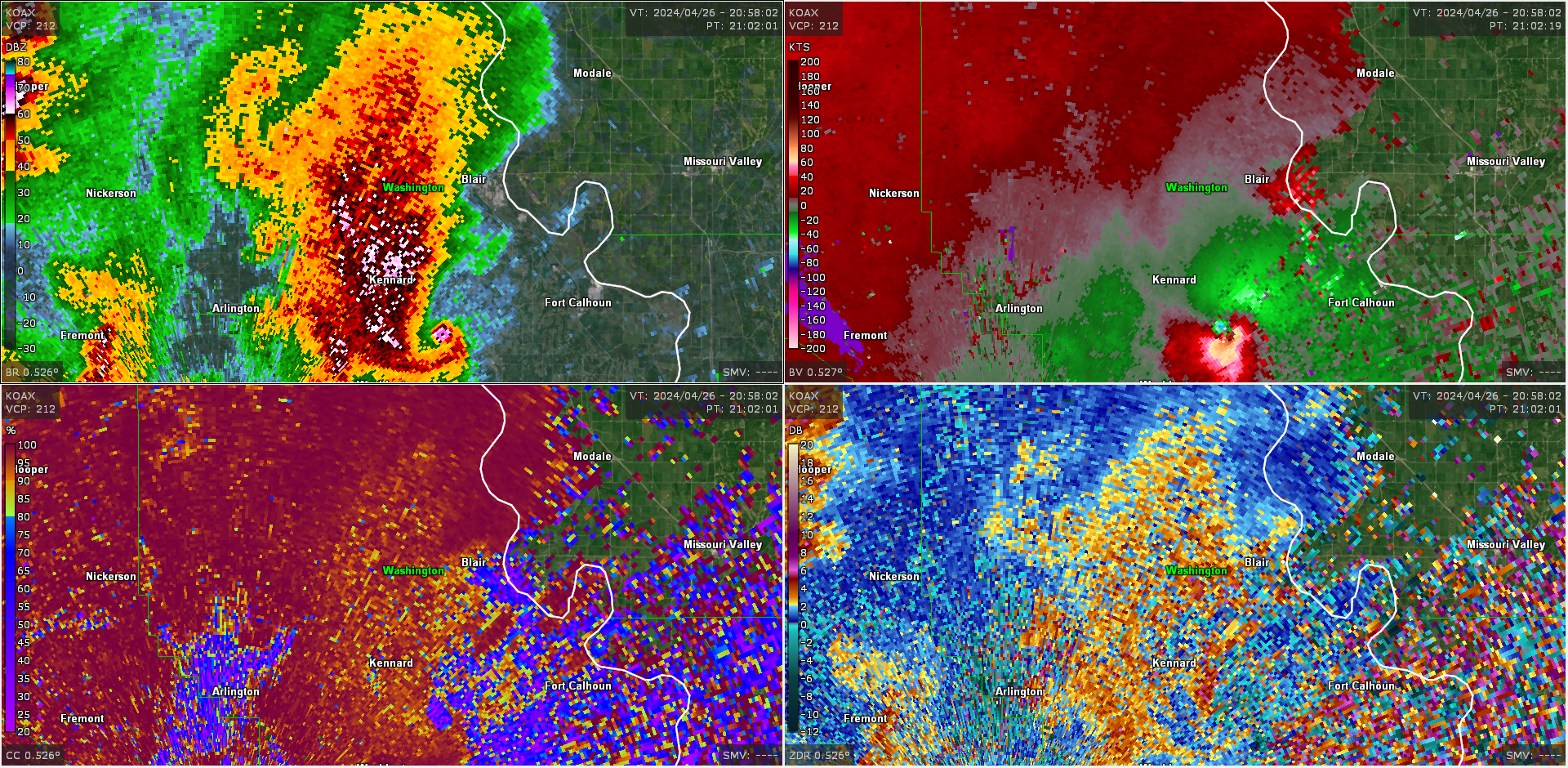
Close range radar image of the violent tornado approaching Blair on April 26th, 2024.

On April 29, 2024, the National Weather Service in Omaha, Nebraska released their preliminary damage survey results for the April 26 tornadoes. Initially, the Elkhorn tornado received a high-end EF3 rating, with wind speeds estimated at 165 mph (266 km/h). A path width of 1,600 yards (1,500 m) and a path length of 32.33-mile (52.03 km) was determined as well. In the final report issued by the NCEI in mid-July, the track was shortened to 31.89-mile (51.32 km) while the width was widened to 1,900 yards (1,700 m). However, in late July 2024, the National Weather Service completed substantial reanalysis of the Elkhorn tornado, including direct comparisons to other tornado damage of similar magnitude, forensic analysis, and careful evaluation of newly available high resolution aerial imagery immediately after the tornado occurred and prior to clean up. This new data suggested that a few small areas of low-end EF4 damage did occur in the Elkhorn tornado, with wind speeds estimated at 170 mph (270 km/h). Although an increase of 5 mph from the previous EF rating, this upgraded the tornado from a high-end EF3, to a low-end EF4 on the Enhanced Fujita scale. An updated path length of 32.49-mile (52.29 km) was also determined, although the path width remained unchanged. The upgrade to EF4 made this the first violent tornado to occur in the state of Nebraska since June 16, 2014, as well as the first violent tornado of the 2024 season, surpassing the Marietta, Oklahoma tornado that occurred the following day.

== Aftermath ==
The tornado was rated as a low-end EF4 with wind speeds estimated at 170 mph (270 km/h), reaching a peak width of 1,900 yards (1,700 m) along a 32.49-mile (52.29 km) path, remaining on the ground for 61 minutes. Four injuries occurred, with no fatalities. The same supercell would later produce four other weak tornadoes, including a large, high-end EF1 tornado east of Pisgah, Iowa that severely damaged several homes. None of the other tornadoes would cause significant damage. A curfew was implemented in Washington County, Nebraska, from 10 pm to 6 am for several days after the tornado struck in order to prevent looting and sightseeing.

== See also ==
- Weather of 2024
- Research on tornadoes in 2024
- List of North American tornadoes and tornado outbreaks
- List of derecho events
- List of F4, EF4, and IF4 tornadoes
  - List of F4, EF4, and IF4 tornadoes (2020–present)
- 2024 Greenfield tornado – Another EF4 tornado that occurred the following month in Iowa
- 2019 Linwood tornado – A similar, large EF4 tornado that struck metropolitan areas in Kansas nearly 5 years prior
