= Dodge Street =

Street in Omaha, Nebraska

- Namesake: Grenville M. Dodge
- Location: Omaha
- East end: I-480 (41°15′34.8″N 95°55′37.8″W)
- West end: 84th Street (41°15′34.8″N 96°02′34.6″W)

Dodge Street is the main east–west street in Omaha, Nebraska. Numbered as U.S. Route 6 (US 6) for most of its length, the street starts in Downtown Omaha and connects to West Dodge Road just west of 78th Street. From there, it continues westward through the remainder of Douglas County.

== About ==
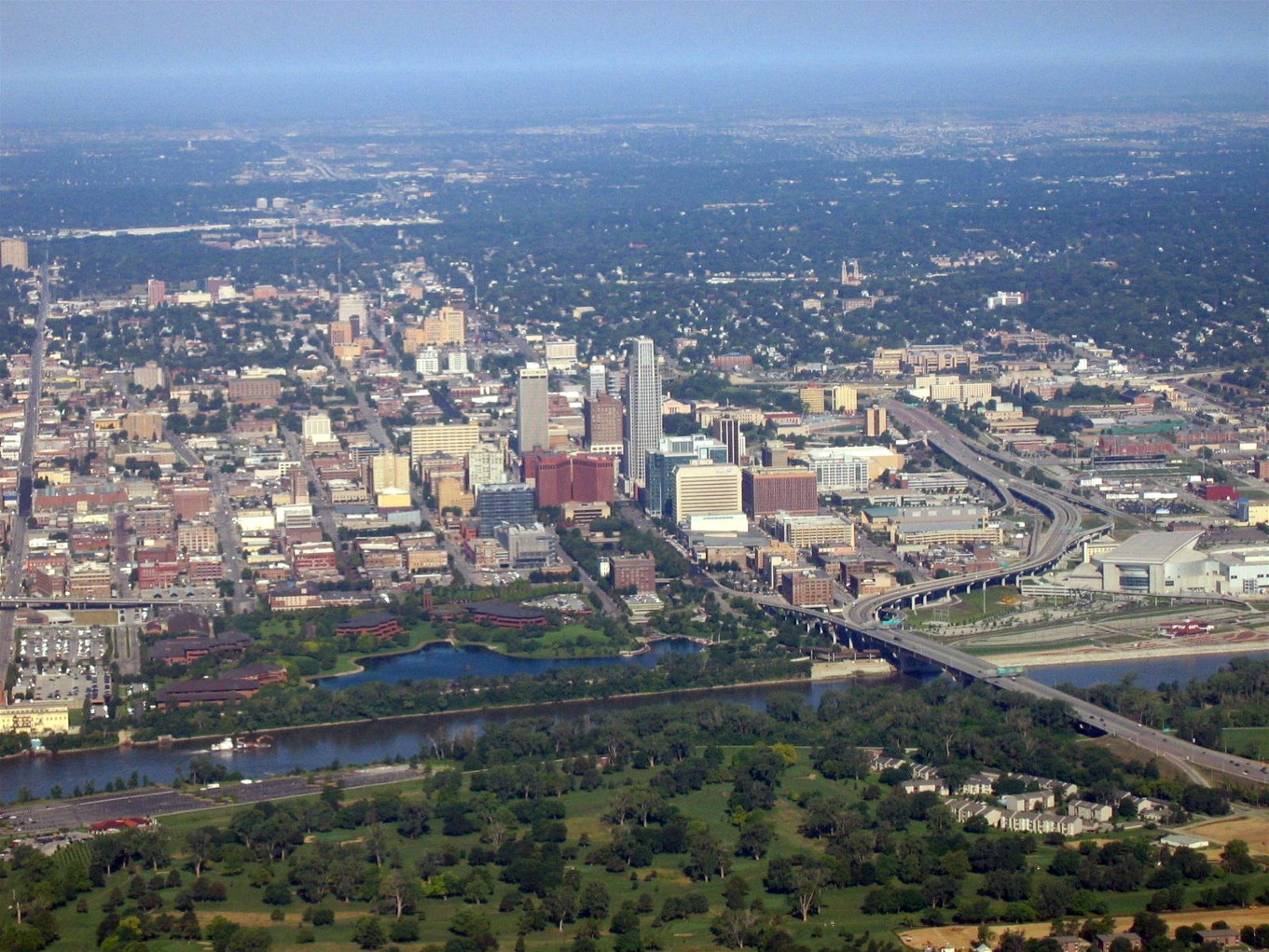
Dodge Street is the major street diverging from I-480 in Downtown Omaha.

Dodge Street was believed to have been named for Iowa Senator Augustus C. Dodge. Dodge was a strong supporter of westward expansion beyond the Missouri River to the Pacific Ocean who originally introduced the bill which led to the Kansas-Nebraska Act. In 2016, the Omaha City Council approved a resolution clarifying that Dodge Street was named after Union General Grenville Dodge and his brother N. P. Dodge, Six miles of Dodge were paved with macadam in June 1894; however, by 1917 citizens were circulating a petition for the road to be graded.

Dodge Street serves as the dividing point between North and South street addresses in Omaha. The street features reversible lanes from 30th Street to 69th Street to accommodate commuter traffic in and out of downtown. From the late 1950s through the late 1980s Dodge Street from 60th through 80th Streets was the main strip for cruising in Omaha. The City of Omaha ended this practice in the early 1990s, when it enacted a law prohibiting U-turns from 8pm to midnight.

== Route ==
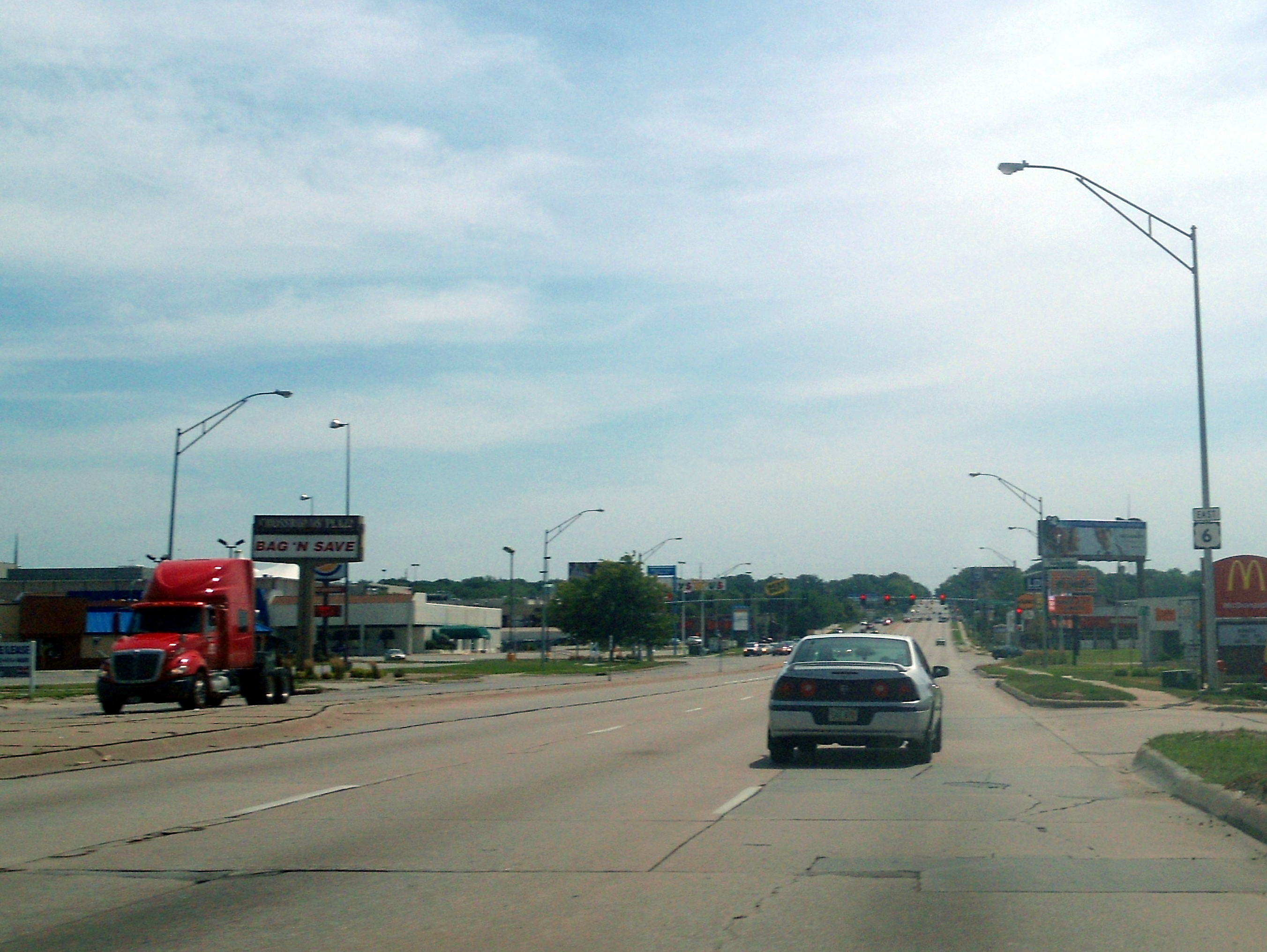
Dodge Street near 76th Street in Omaha

Dodge Street begins as a westbound one-way offramp from I-480 right after it crosses the Missouri River from Iowa. Traveling through Downtown Omaha, this stretch begins the route of the former Lincoln Highway in Omaha. Along it are several buildings listed on the National Register of Historic Places, including the Kirschbraun and Sons Creamery, Inc. at 901 Dodge Street, The Logan at 1804 Dodge Street, and the Simon Brothers Company at 1024 Dodge Street. The street was once lined by the Old Post Office. Accommodating U.S. 6, it conjoins with Douglas Street at 30th Street to hold five lanes of two-way traffic.

At approximately 45th Street, the Saddle Creek Underpass takes Saddle Creek Road under Dodge Street. It is included on the Bridges in Nebraska Multiple Property Submission. Dundee is a historic neighborhood in Midtown Omaha centered near 50th and Dodge Streets. Originally a separate city, Dundee was annexed by Omaha in 1915. The University of Nebraska Omaha and the former Crossroads Mall are located near the intersection of 72nd Street and Dodge.

=== West Dodge Road ===
West Dodge Road is one of the main east & west streets in West Omaha. Beginning immediately west of 78th Street, the main six-lane road curves northwest, aligning itself with Cass Street. At this point, Dodge Street itself continues up the hill (between Methodist Hospital and Children's Hospital) and terminates at 84th Street.

=== West Dodge Expressway ===
Before Westroads Mall and the Regency community, West Dodge Road becomes a controlled-access freeway at 96th Street (eastbound, stop lights do not begin until 90th), with an elevated local-express lane segment from I-680 through 132nd Street. The West Dodge freeway travels west by Boys Town and Elkhorn.

At 204th Street (Nebraska Highway 31), U.S. 6 exits to turn south towards Gretna and the freeway becomes Nebraska Link 28B. At 240th Street, the freeway turns north towards Fremont as part of U.S. Route 275.

==== Exit list ====
All exits are unnumbered.

County	Location	mi	km	Destinations	Notes
Dodge	Fremont	0.0	0.0	Luther Road	At-grade intersection; west end of freeway; highway continues as US 275 / US 30 (Lincoln Highway)
Dodge	Fremont	2.3	3.7	US 30 – Fremont, Blair	East end of US 30 overlap
Dodge	Fremont	3.9	6.3	Military Avenue	
Dodge	Fremont	4.9	7.9	Morningside Road	
Douglas	Mercer	8.6	13.8	N-36 – Bennington, Fremont, North Omaha	
Douglas	Valley	13.2	21.2	N-64 west – Valley	West end of N-64 overlap
Douglas	Valley	15.2	24.5	Meigs Street / 252nd Street	
Douglas	Waterloo	16.7	26.9	N-64 east (West Maple Road) – Waterloo	Eastbound exit and westbound entrance; east end of N-64 overlap
Douglas	Waterloo	18.2	29.3	Blondo Street	
Douglas		18.7	30.1	L-28B begins / US 275 east (240th Street) to N-92 (West Center Road) / West Dodge Road – Omaha, Wahoo	US 275 (east) splits from freeway; western terminus of L-28B
Douglas		20.1	32.3	228th Street – Waterloo	
Douglas	Omaha	21.0	33.8	Skyline Drive	
Douglas	Omaha	22.1	35.6	US 6 west / N-31 (204th Street) / L-28B ends – Elkhorn, Lincoln	Eastern terminus of L-28B; US 6 (west) splits from freeway
Douglas	Omaha	23.1	37.2	192nd Street	
Douglas	Omaha	24.1	38.8	180th Street	
Douglas	Omaha	25.0	40.2	168th Street	
Douglas	Omaha	26.1	42.0	156th Street	
Douglas	Omaha	26.6	42.8	150th Street / Applied Parkway	Applied Pkwy. not signed westbound
Douglas	Omaha	27.1	43.6	144th Street	
Douglas	Omaha	27.6	44.4	137th Street – Boys Town	
Douglas	Omaha	28.1	45.2	132nd Street	
Douglas	Omaha	28.8	46.3	120th Street / 114th Street – Old Mill	
Douglas	Omaha	30.4	48.9	I-680 to I-80	Exit 3 along I-680
Douglas	Omaha	30.8	49.6	102nd Street / 98th Street / Regency Parkway – Westroads Mall	98th St. not signed eastbound
Douglas	Omaha	31.1	50.1	96th Street	At-grade intersection; east end of freeway; highway continues as US 6 (West Dodge Road)
1.000 mi = 1.609 km; 1.000 km = 0.621 mi: Concurrency terminus; Route transition

== History ==
Omaha's Capitol Hill was originally located at the intersection of 20th and Dodge, at the building where the Nebraska Territory legislature convened. The steep grade of Dodge Street was reduced from 12% to 7% in the 1920s, dramatically altering the face of the grounds surrounding Omaha Central High School. The original Boys Town was opened on West Dodge Road in 1921, and the Joslyn Art Museum opened at 26th and Dodge in 1931. Omaha's notable Saddle Creek Underpass was built to facilitate traffic along Dodge Street by the Works Progress Administration in 1934. The Memorial Park Pedestrian Bridge was completed in 1968.

The expressway was opened in 2006.

== See also ==
- Transportation in Omaha
