= U.S. Route 275 =

Numbered U.S. Highway in the United States

U.S. Route 275
- US 275 highlighted in red

Route information
- Auxiliary route of US 75
- Length: 265.82 mi (Note: Total mileage is the sum of the state mileages.) (427.80 km): 15.576 miles (25.067 km) in Missouri; 59.158 miles (95.206 km) in Iowa; 190.82 miles (307.10 km) in Nebraska

Major junctions
- South end: US 136 at Rock Port, MO
- US 34 near Glenwood, IA; I-29 in Council Bluffs, IA; US 75 in Omaha, NE; I-80 in Omaha, NE; US 30 / US 77 in Fremont, NE; US 81 in Norfolk, NE
- West end: US 20 / US 281 in O'Neill, NE

Location
- Country: United States
- States: Missouri, Iowa, Nebraska

Highway system
- United States Numbered Highway System; List; Special; Divided
← Route 273	MO	→ Route 283
← I-235	IA	→ I-280
← N-250	NE	→ US 281

U.S. Route 275 (US 275) is a north–south United States Numbered Highway that is a branch of US 75. It originally terminated at US 75 in Council Bluffs, Iowa. The highway's northern terminus is in O'Neill, Nebraska, at an intersection with US 20 and US 281. Its southern terminus is near Rock Port, Missouri, at an intersection with US 136.

== Route description ==
US 275 is signed north–south in Missouri and Iowa, while in Nebraska, it is signed east–west.

=== Missouri ===
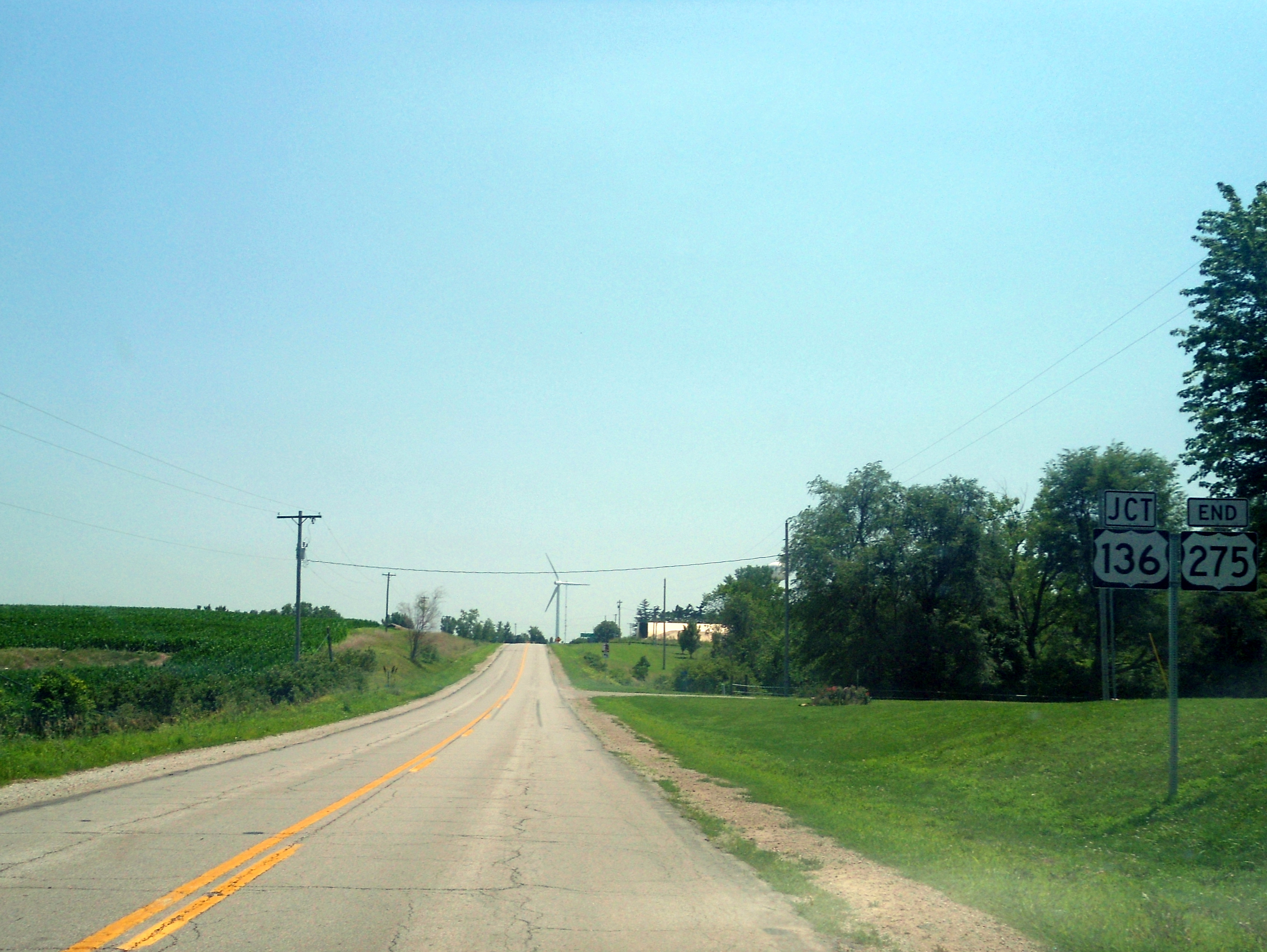
Southern terminus of US 275 at US 136 near Rock Port, Missouri

US 275 begins at an intersection with US 136 one mile (1.6 km) west of Rock Port. It travels to the north and to the northwest through Atchison County for 16 miles (26 km).

=== Iowa ===
US 275 crosses into Iowa 1 1/2 miles (2.4 km) south of Hamburg. It enters Hamburg and intersects Iowa Highway 333 (Iowa 333), which connects to Interstate 29 (I-29) 1 1/2 miles (2.4 km) to the west. North of Hamburg, it intersects Iowa 2, and the two routes run concurrently for five miles (8.0 km). US 275 and Iowa 2 then bypass Sidney on its east side, and east of Sidney, US 275 and Iowa 2 separate. From east of Sidney, US 275 continues north for 20 miles (32 km) through Tabor until it intersects US 34 east of Glenwood. US 275 and US 34 then overlap for eight miles (13 km), mostly bypassing Glenwood. West of Glenwood, US 34 and US 275 split at an interchange with I-29; US 34 follows southbound I-29, while US 275 follows northbound I-29. For 13 miles (21 km), US 275 overlaps I-29, ending at an interchange with Iowa 92 in southern Council Bluffs. Turning west, US 275/Iowa 92 travel together for five miles (8.0 km) in Iowa and cross the new South Omaha Veterans Memorial Bridge over the Missouri River.

=== Nebraska ===
US 275 enters Nebraska in Omaha in the South Omaha neighborhood paired with Nebraska Highway 92 (N-92). It goes through Omaha as a four-lane highway until meeting N-31. The street designations for US 275 in Omaha are, from east to west, Missouri Avenue, L Street, Industrial Road and West Center Road. It crosses the Elkhorn River, which it will follow for most of the rest of the route, then separates from N-92. It goes northwest and becomes freeway until Fremont. It meets US 30 and they are paired together around Fremont until meeting US 77. US 275 turns north with US 77, meets N-91 and separates from US 77 near Winslow.

It turns northwest with N-91 and they separate near Scribner, Nebraska. US 275 goes north through West Point, turns northwest through Wisner, and then turns west. At Norfolk it meets US 81. It continues west-northwest, meets US 20 near Inman and the two routes overlap until US 275 ends at an intersection with US 281 in downtown O'Neill.

== History ==
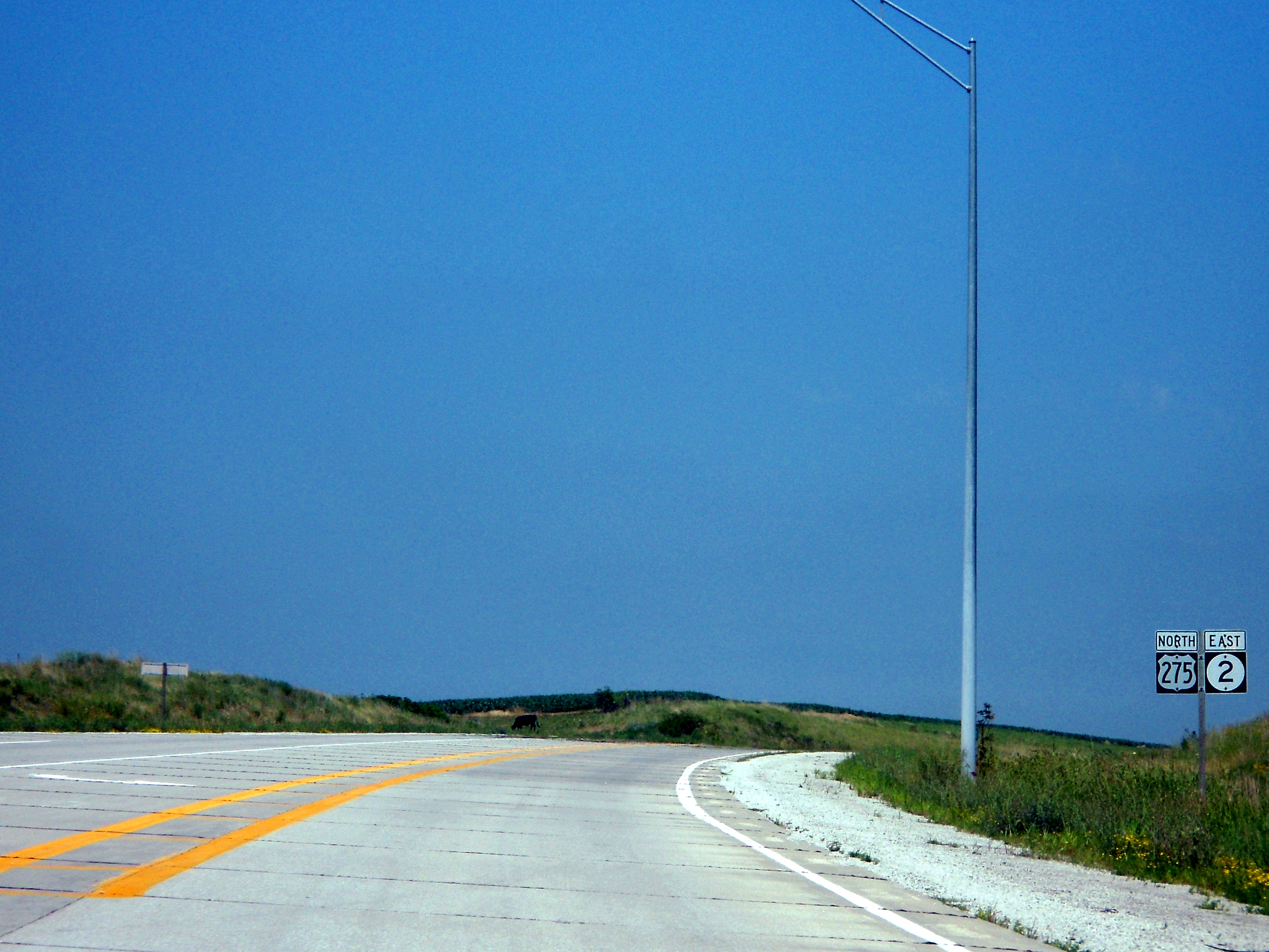
US 275 and Iowa 2 concur near Sidney

At its opening in 1930, US 275 ran from Council Bluffs to Saint Joseph, Missouri. In 1939 the route was extended northwest into Nebraska. In 1963 US 275 was truncated to its current end in northwestern Missouri.

Prior to 1963, US 275 extended south to St. Joseph. The route followed current US 136 east from Rock Port to its intersection with US 59 near Tarkio, then south with US 59 to St. Joseph.

Before November 2001, US 275 ran alongside the Union Pacific tracks between Waterloo and Fremont, Nebraska. This routing was replaced by a new freeway segment built as part of a project to connect Fremont via freeway to Omaha. This segment is officially called Reichmuth Road in Douglas County and Bell Street in Fremont.

Prior to July 1, 2003, US 275 followed a winding two-lane road between Council Bluffs and Glenwood, Iowa. The segment moved to a concurrency with US 34 and I-29 that day as part of a mass decommissioning of highways in Iowa. This road is now Mills County and Pottawattamie County Road L35.

== Major intersections ==
Mileposts reset at state line crossings. In Nebraska, US 275 is considered an east–west highway, its mileposts run from west to east

State	County	Location	mi	km	Exit	Destinations	Notes
Missouri	Atchison	Rock Port	0.000	0.000		US 136 / Lewis and Clark Trail – Rock Port, Phelps City	
			15.576 0.000	25.067 0.000		Lewis and Clark Trail ends; Loess Hills National Scenic Byway begins Missouri–Iowa line	
Iowa	Fremont	Hamburg	2.126	3.421		Iowa 333 west / Loess Hills National Scenic Byway north	
Iowa	Fremont	Washington–Sidney township line	7.947	12.789		Iowa 2 west / CR J46 east – Riverton, Nebraska City	Southern end of Iowa 2 overlap; former Iowa 42
Iowa	Fremont	Sidney	12.667	20.386		Iowa 2 east – Shenandoah	Northern end of Iowa 2 overlap
Iowa	Fremont	Sidney–Green township line	18.652	30.017		CR J24 – Thurman	Former Iowa 145
Iowa	Fremont	Green Township	22.650	36.452		CR J18 / Loess Hills National Scenic Byway south – Randolph	Former Iowa 184
Iowa	Mills	Center Township	33.548	53.990		US 34 east – Red Oak	Southern end of US 34 concurrency
Iowa	Mills	Center Township	35.108	56.501		CR H30 – Glenwood	Former US 34
Iowa	Mills	Glenwood	37.881	60.964	8	CR L35 / Loess Hills National Scenic Byway north – Glenwood, Pacific Junction	Exit number follows US 34; former US 275 and Iowa 385
Iowa	Mills	Plattville Township	41.298– 42.110	66.463– 67.769		I-29 south / US 34 west – Kansas City, South Bellevue	Northern end of US 34 concurrency; southern end of I-29 overlap; I-29 exit 35A
Iowa	Mills	St. Marys Township	48.834	78.591	42	CR H10 – Bellevue	Exit number follows I-29; former Iowa 370
Iowa	Pottawattamie	Council Bluffs	54.037	86.964		I-29 north to I-80 – Sioux City Iowa 92 east (Veterans Memorial Highway)	Northern end of I-29 concurrency; southern end of Iowa 92 overlap; I-29 exit 47
Missouri River			59.158 190.82	95.206 307.10	South Omaha Veterans Memorial Bridge; Iowa–Nebraska line Iowa 92 ends / N-92 begins		
Nebraska	Douglas	Omaha	189.53	305.02		US 75 (Kennedy Freeway) to I-80	Interchange
Nebraska	Douglas	Omaha	185.71	298.87		72nd Street	Interchange
Nebraska	Douglas	Omaha	184.71	297.26		N-85 south (84th Street)	
Nebraska	Douglas	Omaha	182.19	293.21		I-680 north / I-80	Cloverleaf interchange with I-80 C/D lanes; I-80 exit 445; I-680 south exit 1
Nebraska	Douglas	Omaha	180.72	290.84		132nd Street / Millard Avenue (N-50 south) to I-80	Northern terminus of N-50
Nebraska	Douglas	Omaha	174.20	280.35		US 6 / N-31 (204th Street) – Gretna, Elkhorn	Interchange
Nebraska	Douglas	Waterloo Precinct	171.16	275.46		N-92 west (West Center Road west) – Wahoo	Western end of N-92 overlap; former US 30A west
Nebraska	Douglas	Waterloo Precinct	168.90	271.82		L-28B east (West Dodge Expressway east) to US 6 – Omaha	East end of expressway section; L-28B is former US 275 Conn., previously US 30A
Nebraska	Douglas	Waterloo Precinct	168.07	270.48	—	Blondo Street	
Nebraska	Douglas	Waterloo Precinct	166.57	268.07	—	N-64 east (West Maple Road) – Waterloo	Eastern end of N-64 overlap; eastbound exit and westbound entrance; former N-130
Nebraska	Douglas	Valley	165.01	265.56	—	Meigs Street / 252nd Street	
Nebraska	Douglas	Valley	163.04	262.39	—	N-64 west – Valley	Western end of N-64 concurrency
Nebraska	Douglas	Platte Valley Precinct	158.50	255.08	—	N-36 – Bennington, Fremont, North Omaha	
Nebraska	Dodge	Elkhorn Township	155.56	250.35	—	US 77 south / Old Highway 8 – Lincoln	Eastern end of US 77 concurrency
Nebraska	Dodge	Fremont	154.56	248.74	—	Morningside Road	
Nebraska	Dodge	Fremont	153.54	247.10	—	Military Avenue – Historic Downtown	
Nebraska	Dodge	Fremont	152.14	244.85	—	US 30 east (Lincoln Highway) – Fremont, Blair	Eastern end of US 30 concurrency; western end of West Dodge Expressway
Nebraska	Dodge	Fremont	148.51	239.00		US 30 west (Lincoln Highway) – Columbus	Western end of US 30 concurrence; interchange
Nebraska	Dodge	Nickerson Township	144.70	232.87		N-91 east – Nickerson	Eastern end of N-91 concurrency
Nebraska	Dodge	Hooper Township	140.85	226.68		US 77 north – Sioux City	Western end of US 77 concurrency; westbound exit and eastbound entrance; interchange
Nebraska	Dodge	Hooper Township	138.41	222.75		S-27D south – Hooper	
Nebraska	Dodge	Pebble Township	126.82	204.10		N-91 west – Snyder, Albion	Western end of N-91 concurrency
Nebraska	Cuming	West Point	118.15	190.14		N-32 east – Oakland	Eastern end of N-32 concurrency
Nebraska	Cuming	West Point	117.49	189.08		N-32 west	Western end of N-32 concurrency
Nebraska	Cuming	West Point	116.04	186.75		N-9 north – Pender	
Nebraska	Cuming	Beemer	109.27	175.85		L-20A north	
Nebraska	Cuming	Wisner	100.80	162.22		N-51 east – Bancroft	
Nebraska	Stanton	Pilger	96.09	154.64		N-15 north – Wayne	Eastern end of N-15 concurrency
Nebraska	Stanton	Pilger	94.08	151.41		N-15 south – Pilger	Western end of N-15 concurrency
Nebraska	Stanton	Dewey Precinct	86.06	138.50		N-57 south – Stanton	
Nebraska	Madison	Norfolk	77.47	124.68		N-24 east – Stanton N-35 north – Norfolk	
Nebraska	Madison	Norfolk	75.12	120.89		US 81 (Johnny Carson Boulevard)	
Nebraska	Madison	Battle Creek	65.71	105.75		N-121 south – Battle Creek	
Nebraska	Antelope	Tilden	53.39	85.92		N-45 south	
Nebraska	Antelope	Neligh	39.63	63.78		N-14 (S Street)	
Nebraska	Holt	Ewing	21.39	34.42		L-45B north	
Nebraska	Holt	Golden Township	13.03	20.97		US 20 east – Orchard	Eastern end of US 20 concurrency
Nebraska	Holt	O'Neill	0.00	0.00		US 20 west / US 281	Western terminus; western end of US 20 concurrency; highway continues as US 20 west/US 281 north (Douglas Street west)
1.000 mi = 1.609 km; 1.000 km = 0.621 mi: Concurrency terminus

== Special route ==
U.S. Highway 275 Connector
- West Dodge Road
- Location: Elkhorn, Nebraska

U.S. Route 275 Connector (US 275 Conn.) was a spur route of US 275 that existed in Elkhorn, Nebraska. The route provided a direct connection from US 6 west of Omaha to US 275 south of Fremont. The route, which ran along a portion of West Dodge Road in Douglas County, was formerly known as US 30 Alternate (US 30A). US 275 Conn. was eventually replaced in its entirety by Nebraska Link 28B (L-28B).

Major junctions
The entire route was in Douglas County.

Location	mi	km	Destinations	Notes
Waterloo Precinct	0.00	0.00	US 275 – Fremont, Wahoo	Western terminus
Elkhorn	3.4	5.5	US 6 / N-31	Interchange; eastern terminus; highway continued east as US 6 (West Dodge Road)
1.000 mi = 1.609 km; 1.000 km = 0.621 mi

== See also ==
- U.S. Route 175
