= Nebraska Link 28B =

State highway in Nebraska, U.S.

Connecting Link 28B
- West Dodge Expressway
- Link 28B highlighted in red

Route information
- Maintained by NDOT
- Length: 3.39 mi (5.46 km)

Major junctions
- West end: US 275 west of Omaha
- East end: US 6 / N-31 in Omaha

Location
- Country: United States
- State: Nebraska
- Counties: Douglas

Highway system
- Nebraska State Highway System; Interstate; US; State; Link; Spur; State Spurs; Recreation
← L-26D	→ L-28E

Nebraska Link 28B (L-28B) is a connecting link highway which connects U.S. Route 275 west of Omaha to U.S. Route 6 in Omaha. The highway is a 3.4-mile (5.5 km) long part of a freeway which stretches to Fremont from Omaha.

== Route description ==
L-28B begins at an interchange with U.S. Route 275 (US 275) west of Omaha. The connections from US 275 eastbound to L-28B eastbound and from L-28B westbound to US 275 westbound make up the dominant road. Eastbound US 275 traffic must exit to stay on the route, while westbound L-28B traffic must exit to access eastbound US 275. Continuing east, L-28B meets 228th Street, which extends to Waterloo, at a diamond interchange. It crosses the Elkhorn River and then meets Skyline Drive, in Elkhorn, at a partial cloverleaf interchange. Now in Omaha, the road is named West Dodge Road. L-28B ends at an interchange with westbound U.S. Route 6 and Nebraska Highway 31. West Dodge Road continues towards Downtown Omaha as eastbound US 6. The entire route's speed limit was increased from 65 miles per hour (105 km/h) to 70 mph (110 km/h) in July 2018

== Major intersections ==
The entire route is in Douglas County. All exits are unnumbered.

Location	mi	km	Destinations	Notes
	0.00	0.00	US 275 west (West Dodge Expressway west) – Fremont	Continuation beyond western terminus
	0.65	1.05	US 275 east (240th Street) to N-92 / West Dodge Road – Wahoo	Westbound exit and eastbound entrance
Omaha	1.39	2.24	228th Street – Waterloo	
Omaha	1.83	2.95	Bridge over Elkhorn River	
Omaha	2.35	3.78	Skyline Drive	
Omaha	3.39	5.46	US 6 west / N-31 (204th Street) – Elkhorn, Lincoln	Eastbound exit and westbound entrance
Omaha	3.39	5.46	US 6 east (West Dodge Expressway east) – Omaha	Continuation beyond eastern terminus
1.000 mi = 1.609 km; 1.000 km = 0.621 mi: Incomplete access
