= U.S. Route 6 in Nebraska =

Section of U.S. Highway in Nebraska, United States

U.S. Highway 6
- Grand Army of the Republic Highway
- US 6 highlighted in red

Route information
- Maintained by NDOT
- Length: 373.00 mi (600.29 km)
- Existed: 1931–present

Major junctions
- West end: US 6 at the Colorado state line near Lamar
- US 34 near Culbertson; US 83 in McCook; US 283 in Arapahoe; US 183 in Holdrege; US 34 / US 281 in Hastings; US 81 in Fairmont; US 77 in Lincoln; I-80 near Waverly; I-680 in Omaha; I-480 / US 75 in Omaha
- East end: I-480 / US 6 at the Iowa state line in Omaha

Location
- Country: United States
- State: Nebraska
- Counties: Chase, Hayes, Hitchcock, Red Willow, Furnas, Harlan, Phelps, Kearney, Adams, Clay, Fillmore, Saline, Seward, Lancaster, Cass, Saunders, Sarpy, Douglas

Highway system
- United States Numbered Highway System; List; Special; Divided; Nebraska State Highway System; Interstate; US; State; Link; Spur; State Spurs; Recreation
← N-5	→ N-7

U.S. Highway 6 (US-6) in the U.S. state of Nebraska is a United States Numbered Highway which goes from the Colorado border west of Imperial in the west to the Iowa border in the east at Omaha. Significant portions of the highway are concurrent with other highways, most significantly, US-34 between Culbertson and Hastings. Also, from Milford east to the Iowa border, the highway is closely paralleled by Interstate 80 (I-80). Large portions of the route parallel the Chicago, Burlington and Quincy Railroad.

== Route description ==
=== Before concurrency with US-34 ===
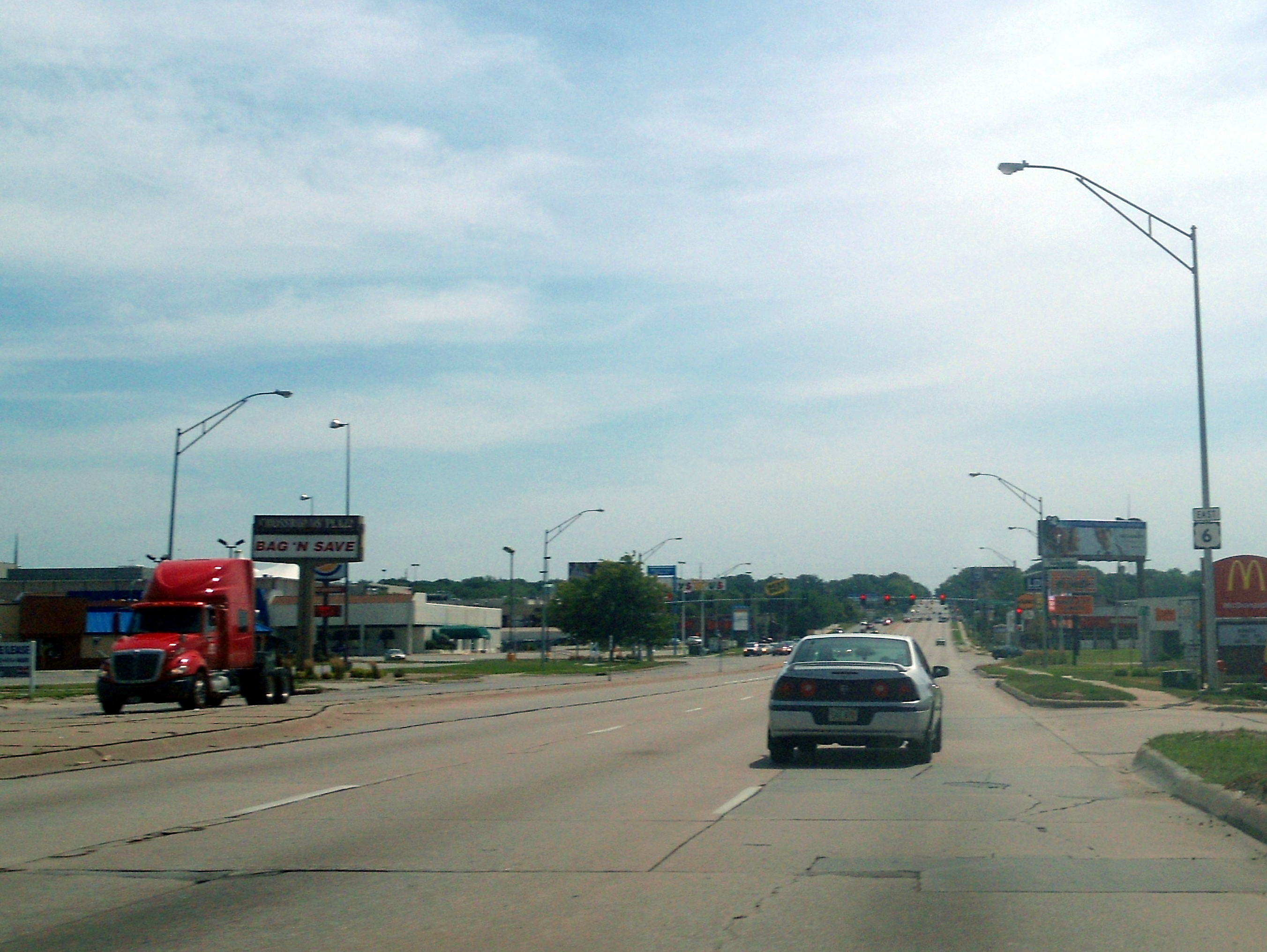
US-6 runs east as Dodge Street in Omaha

US-6 enters Nebraska from Colorado west of Imperial on a short southeasterly segment. It turns east and stays due east until shortly before Imperial. It then goes into Imperial and meets Nebraska Highway 61 (N-61). The two routes are paired together until they separate at the Enders Reservoir State Recreation Area. It goes in a generally southeasterly direction until it meets US-34 west of Culbertson.

=== Western Nebraska ===
US-6 and US-34 continue east together through Culbertson and at McCook, is briefly concurrent with US-83. US-6/US-34 continue together in a northeasterly direction through Cambridge, then turns due east and meets US-283 in Arapahoe. Near Edison, it meets US-136, which begins at its intersection with US-6/US-34. Further east, the two highways meet N-4 and turns northeast toward Holdrege. In Holdrege, US-6/US-34 meet US-183. The highways continue on a northeasterly trajectory through Minden until Heartwell. At Heartwell, US-6/US-34 turns due east until Hastings. In Hastings, US-6/US-34 meet US-281 and US-34 separates to go with US-281 while US-6 continues eastward.

=== Eastern Nebraska ===
US-6 continues on a due east highway from Hastings. Near Sutton, the highway turns northeast to go through Sutton. It continues east, and, at Fairmont, US-6 encounters US-81. After passing through Friend, US-6 meets N-15, and the two highways overlap until shortly before Milford. US-6 goes east, then north out of Milford, then US-6 turns east to go toward Lincoln.

=== Lancaster County ===
In Lincoln, US-6 comes into the city on West "O" Street, portions of which are divided highway. At Sun Valley Boulevard, it turns to go northeasterly. At North 10th Street, US-6 turns north-northwest and becomes North 11th Street, a divided highway. At Cornhusker Highway, US-6 turns east with a short urban connection to I-180 on the west along Cornhusker. US-6 then follows Cornhusker Highway, which is a divided highway, northeast out of the city. At the eastern end of Cornhusker Highway (near Waverly), US-6 meets I-80.

=== Omaha ===
From I-80, US-6 goes northeast through Waverly, Greenwood, and Ashland. East of Ashland, US-6 crosses the Platte River. After that, US-6 meets N-31 in Gretna, where US-6 turns north with N-31 on a divided highway. US-6/N-31 meet US-275 and N-92 near the Elkhorn neighborhood of Omaha, and they separate in Elkhorn itself at a freeway interchange which also has Nebraska Link 28B, a connector to US-275.

At this point, US-6 goes onto the freeway, the West Dodge Expressway, and turns due east to go toward Downtown Omaha. At 137th Street is the exit for Boys Town. Between 120th and 108th streets, US-6 is an elevated freeway with separate viaducts for eastbound and westbound traffic. Shortly after this ends, US-6 meets I-680. East of I-680, US-6 continues east as West Dodge Road and at Cass Street, turns briefly southeast where West Dodge Road ends, and follows Dodge Street eastward. Before North 30th Street, US-6 splits into two one-way streets, with Dodge Street serving westbound traffic, and Douglas Street serving the eastbound. US-6 goes through downtown and then goes up onto I-480, which is an elevated freeway around Downtown Omaha, and, shortly thereafter, crosses into Iowa via the Grenville Dodge Memorial Bridge.

== History ==

When the U.S. Numbered Highway System was created in 1926, much of the current US-6 in Nebraska was US-38. The route was slightly different in the Omaha area, as it turned east from 204th Street onto Q Street to go through what was the city of Millard. It went through Millard on what is now Millard Avenue (N-50), then north on 132nd Street, then east on Center Street, and then north on 36th Street to end at Farnam Street. In 1932, US-38 was deleted and replaced by US-6.

The cities of Hastings and Lincoln also each had a US-6 City. These are former routes for US-6 in those cities. US-6 City in Hastings was deleted in 1970 and, in Lincoln, US-6 City was deleted in 1983.

== Future ==
The Nebraska Department of Roads is planning a total rebuild and partial realignment/rerouting of US-6 from its current path along Sun Valley Boulevard in Lincoln. The project is years away from being built.

== Commemorative and other highway names ==
- Grand Army of the Republic Highway (statewide)
- Carl T. Curtis Drive in Kearney County
- West "O" Street, Sun Valley Boulevard, North 11th Street, Cornhusker Highway in Lincoln
- 204th Street, West Dodge Expressway, West Dodge Road, Dodge Street, Douglas Street, Gerald R. Ford Expressway in Omaha

== Major intersections ==
All exits are unnumbered.

County	Location	mi	km	Destinations	Notes
Chase		0.000	0.000	US 6 west – Holyoke, Sterling	Continuation into Colorado
Chase	Imperial	24.11	38.80	S-15A south (Broadway Street)	
Chase	Imperial	24.95	40.15	N-61 north	Western end of N-61 overlap
Chase	Enders	34.53	55.57	N-61 south	Eastern end of N-61 overlap
Hayes	Hamlet	49.70	79.98	S-43A north	
Hitchcock	Palisade	57.21	92.07	N-25A north – Hayes Center	
Hitchcock		63.36	101.97	N-25 – Hayes Center, Trenton	
Hitchcock		70.54	113.52	L-44C east	
Hitchcock		71.11	114.44	US 34 west	Western end of US 34 overlap
Hitchcock		71.52	115.10	L-44C west	
Hitchcock	Culbertson	74.03	119.14	N-17 south	
Red Willow	McCook	84.78	136.44	US 83 north	Western end of US 83 overlap
Red Willow	McCook	86.21	138.74	US 83 south (6th Street)	Eastern end of US 83 overlap
Furnas	Cambridge	111.38	179.25	N-47 south (Patterson Street)	
Furnas	Arapahoe	125.86	202.55	US 283 (Nebraska Avenue)	
Furnas		132.06	212.53	US 136 east	
Furnas		139.99	225.29	N-46 south	
Harlan		144.46	232.49	N-4 east	
Phelps	Holdrege	157.16	252.92	N-23 west (4th Avenue)	
Phelps	Holdrege	157.76	253.89	US 183 (Burlington Street)	
Kearney	Axtell	169.60	272.94	N-44 south (21 Road)	Western end of N-44 overlap
Kearney	Axtell	173.68	279.51	N-44 north (25 Road)	Eastern end of N-44 overlap
Kearney	Minden	180.78	290.94	N-10	
Kearney		181.78	292.55	Truck Route to N-74 east	
Adams	Kenesaw	197.40	317.68	S-1A north (Smith Way)	
Adams	Juniata	205.38	330.53	S-1B north (Juniata Avenue)	
Adams	Hastings	208.88	336.16	S-1C north	
Adams	Hastings	210.87	339.36	US 281 south (Baltimore Avenue) – Red Cloud	Western end of US 281 overlap
Adams	Hastings	211.41	340.23	US 34 east / US 281 north (Burlington Avenue) to I-80 – Hastings Museum	Eastern end of US 34/US 281 overlap; serves Mary Lanning Healthcare
Adams		214.28	344.85	Showboat Boulevard (County Truck Route) to I-80 / US 34 north / US 281 north	
Clay	Harvard	227.15	365.56	S-18A north (Road K)	
Clay		230.17	370.42	N-14 south (Road N)	Western end of N-14 overlap
Clay		233.14	375.20	N-14 north (Road Q)	Eastern end of N-14 overlap
Clay	Saronville	236.14	380.03	S-18G north (Road T)	
Fillmore	Fairmont	255.63– 255.65	411.40– 411.43	US 81 – York, Geneva	Interchange
Saline	Cordova	268.79	432.58	S-76A north	
Saline	Friend	271.79	437.40	L-80E	
Saline		277.78	447.04	N-15 south	Western end of N-15 overlap
Saline	Dorchester	278.39	448.03	N-33 east	
Saline	Dorchester	280.98	452.19	L-76E south	
Seward		289.50	465.91	N-15 north	Eastern end of N-15 overlap
Seward		295.48	475.53	L-80H north	
Seward		301.51	485.23	N-103	
Lancaster	Emerald	306.49	493.25	S-55A south (SW 84th Street)	
Lancaster	Lincoln	308.96	497.22	L-55K north (NW 48th Street) to I-80 – Lincoln Air Park	
Lancaster	Lincoln	309.85– 310.47	498.66– 499.65	I-80 west	Closed; former exit 396 on I-80
Lancaster	Lincoln	310.68– 310.69	499.99– 500.01	US 77 (Homestead Expressway) / I-80 east	Interchange
Lancaster	Lincoln	314.32	505.85	To I-180 / US 34 / Cornhusker Highway / 11th Street	
Lancaster	Lincoln	314.50	506.14	14th Street / Antelope Valley Parkway	Interchange; no westbound exit (westbound access via Adams St or Yolande Ave)
Lancaster	Lincoln	318.09	511.92	L-55X north (56th Street)	Former US 77 north
Lancaster	Lincoln	319.80	514.67	70th Street south	Interchange; westbound exit and eastbound entrance via Cotner Boulevard
Lancaster	Waverly	322.69– 323.27	519.32– 520.25	I-80 – Omaha	I-80 exit 409
Cass		335.61	540.11	N-63 south to I-80	
Saunders	Ashland	337.44	543.06	N-66	
Platte River		340.22	547.53	Bridge	
Sarpy	Gretna	344.88	555.03	N-31 south (216th Street)	Western end of N-31 overlap
Sarpy	Gretna	348.46	560.79	N-370 east (West Gruenther Road)	
Douglas		354.53	570.56	US 275 / N-92 (West Center Road)	Interchange
Douglas	Omaha	356.53	573.78	N-31 north (204th Street) / L-28B west (West Dodge Expressway west) – Fremont, Wahoo	Eastern end of N-31 overlap; western end of freeway section; L-28B is former US 275 Conn., previously US 30A west
Douglas	Omaha	357.52	575.37	192nd Street	
Douglas	Omaha	358.52	576.98	180th Street	
Douglas	Omaha	359.41	578.41	168th Street	
Douglas	Omaha	360.51	580.18	156th Street	
Douglas	Omaha	361.00	580.97	150th Street / Applied Parkway	Applied Pkwy. not signed westbound
Douglas	Omaha	361.50	581.78	144th Street	
Douglas	Omaha	361.97	582.53	137th Street – Boys Town	
Douglas	Omaha	362.50	583.39	132nd Street	
Douglas	Omaha	363.20– 363.23	584.51– 584.56	120th Street / 114th Street – Old Mill	
Douglas	Omaha	364.23– 365.12	586.17– 587.60	I-680 to I-80	I-680 exit 3
Douglas	Omaha	365.29– 365.33	587.88– 587.94	102nd Street / 98th Street / Regency Parkway – Westroads Mall	98th St. not signed eastbound
Douglas	Omaha	365.57	588.33	96th Street	At-grade intersection; eastern end of freeway section
Douglas	Omaha	366.02	589.05	90th Street (N-133 north)	Southern terminus of N-133
Douglas	Omaha	369.84	595.20	Saddle Creek Road	Interchange; bridge over Saddle Creek Underpass; former N-38
Douglas	Omaha	371.27	597.50	I-480 east (Gerald R. Ford Expressway) / US 75 north (North Freeway)	Interchange; I-480/US 75 exits 2A-B
Douglas	Omaha	372.80	599.96	To 9th Street	Interchange; eastbound left exit only
Douglas	Omaha	372.80	599.96	The Riverfront	Interchange; eastbound exit only
Douglas	Omaha	372.88	600.09	I-480 west (Gerald R. Ford Expressway east) to I-80	Western end of I-480 overlap; westbound left exit and eastbound left entrance; I-480 exit 4
Missouri River		373.00	600.29	Grenville Dodge Memorial Bridge; Nebraska–Iowa line	
Missouri River		373.00	600.29	I-480 east / US 6 east / Lincoln Highway Heritage Byway – Council Bluffs	Continuation into Iowa
1.000 mi = 1.609 km; 1.000 km = 0.621 mi: Closed/former; Concurrency terminus; Incomplete access; Route transition

== See also ==
- Dodge Street
- Lincoln Highway (Omaha)
- Saddle Creek Underpass

U.S. Route 6
Previous state: Colorado	Nebraska	Next state: Iowa
