= Nebraska Highway 31 =

State highway in Nebraska, U.S.

State Highway 31

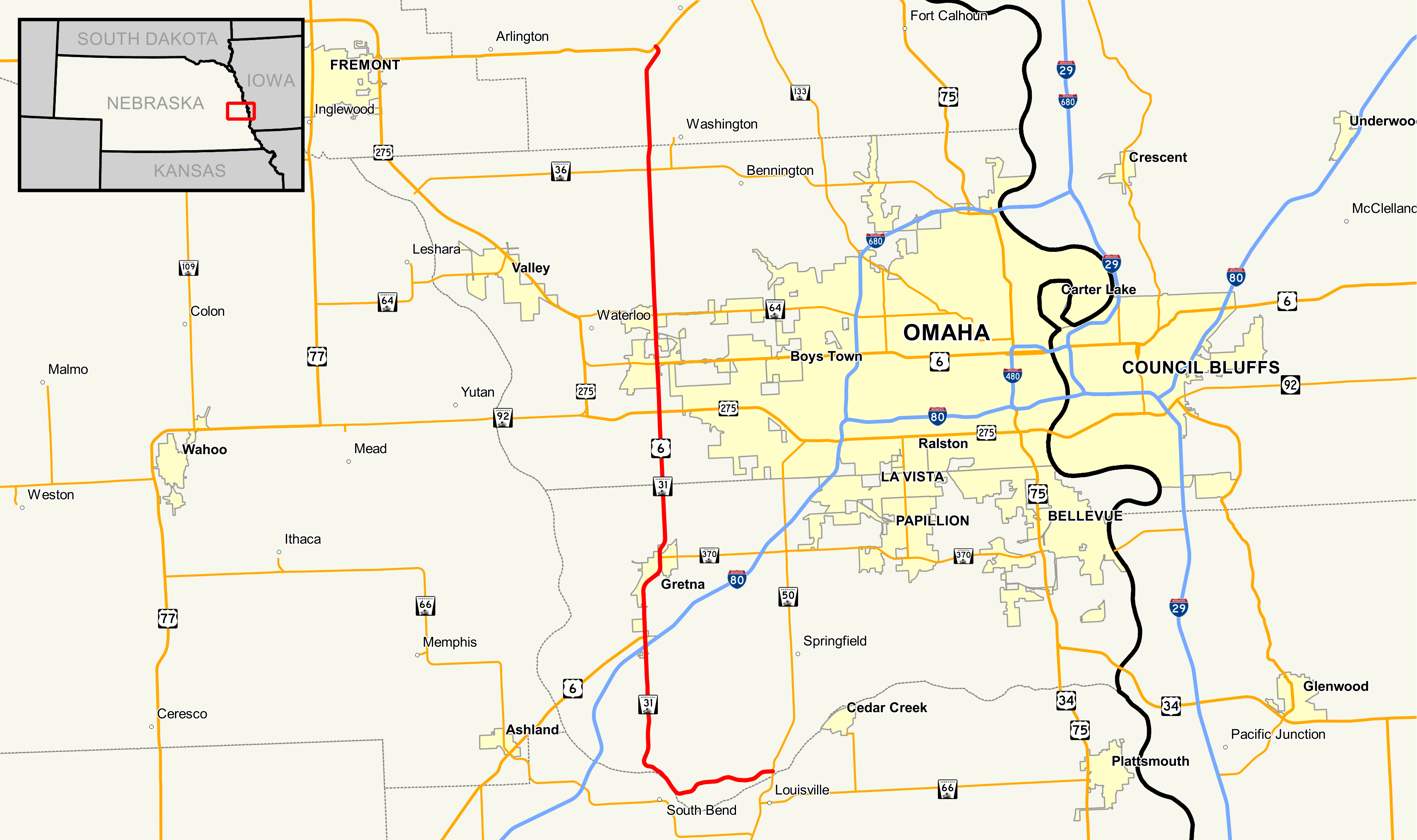
- Nebraska Highway 31 highlighted in red

Route information
- Maintained by NDOT
- Length: 36.33 mi (58.47 km)
- Existed: 1925–present

Major junctions
- South end: N-50 north of Louisville
- I-80 south of Gretna; US 6 from Gretna to Omaha; US 275 / N-92 in Omaha
- North end: US 30 southwest of Kennard

Location
- Country: United States
- State: Nebraska
- Counties: Sarpy, Douglas, Washington

Highway system
- Nebraska State Highway System; Interstate; US; State; Link; Spur; State Spurs; Recreation
← US 30	→ N-32

Nebraska Highway 31 is a highway in Nebraska. The southern terminus is near Louisville at an intersection with Nebraska Highway 50. The northern terminus is near Kennard at an intersection with U.S. Highway 30. The highway serves as a main north–south highway in the western portion of the Omaha Metro Area.

== Route description ==
Nebraska Highway 31 begins just north of Louisville at Nebraska Highway 50. It goes west on an alignment which lies just north of the Platte River. After five and a half miles, NE 31 comes to the entrance of Schramm Park State Recreation Area, after which, it turns north. Just south of Interstate 80, NE 31 becomes a divided highway. After crossing I-80, NE 31 meets U.S. Highway 6 and the two highways begin an overlap.

NE 31 and US 6 continue north into Gretna, where the divided highway ends. At Gretna, NE 31 and US 6 meet Nebraska Highway 370. They continue north and become divided highway again. Near the Elkhorn neighborhood of Omaha, NE 31 and US 6 meet U.S. Highway 275 and Nebraska Highway 92, which is West Center Road. Two miles later, they separate at an intersection in which they also meet Nebraska Link 28B, which is West Dodge Road.

NE 31 continues through Elkhorn, and then meets Nebraska Highway 64. It continues north and then meets Nebraska Highway 36 and ends at an intersection southwest of Kennard with U.S. Highway 30.

== Major intersections ==
County	Location	mi	km	Destinations	Notes
Sarpy	Platford-Springfield I Precinct	0.00	0.00	N-50 – Springfield, Louisville	Southern terminus
Sarpy	Melia-Forest City Precinct			South Sarpy Expressway	Proposed interchange
Sarpy	Gretna	11.04	17.77	I-80 – Omaha, Lincoln	I-80 exit 432
Sarpy	Gretna	11.38	18.31	US 6 west – Ashland	South end of US 6 overlap
Sarpy	Gretna	14.97	24.09	N-370 east (Strategic Air Command Memorial Highway)	Western terminus of N-370
Douglas	Omaha	21.04	33.86	US 275 / N-92 (West Center Road) – South Omaha, Wahoo	Interchange
Douglas	Omaha	23.03	37.06	US 6 east (West Dodge Expressway east) / L-28B west (West Dodge Expressway west) – Omaha, Fremont, Wahoo	Interchange; eastern terminus of L-28B; north end of US 6 overlap
Douglas	Omaha	24.31	39.12	Old Lincoln Highway / Park Road – Library	Interchange via connector roads
Douglas	Omaha	25.04	40.30	N-64 (West Maple Road) – Waterloo	Former N-130
Douglas	Elkhorn Precinct	31.03	49.94	N-36 – Fremont, Bennington, Omaha	Roundabout
Washington	Township 7	36.32	58.45	US 30 – Fremont, Arlington, Blair	Northern terminus
1.000 mi = 1.609 km; 1.000 km = 0.621 mi: Concurrency terminus; Unopened

== Points of interest ==
- Schramm Park State Recreation Area
- Nebraska Crossing Factory Outlet
