= Schramm Park State Recreation Area =

Recreation area in Nebraska, United States

- IUCN category V (protected landscape/seascape)
- Location within Nebraska
- Interactive map of Schramm Park State Recreation Area
- Location: Gretna, Nebraska, United States
- Nearest city: Omaha, Nebraska
- Coordinates: 41°01′13.33″N 96°14′53.70″W
- Area: 331 acres (134 ha)
- Governing body: Nebraska Game and Parks Commission

Schramm Park State Recreation Area is a state recreation area in southeast Nebraska, United States, on the north side of the Platte River in Sarpy County.

The area currently has 3 miles (4.8 km) of scenic nature trails, picnic areas, the Schramm Education Center and the Gretna State Fish Hatchery, the oldest fish hatchery in the State of Nebraska, established in 1882. The hatch house is now operated as a fish hatchery museum.

The Schramm Education Center features multiple viewing tanks with a variety of fish species. The facility also features multiple terrariums featuring reptiles, amphibians, and insects.

Please visit schrammparkhistory.omeka.net for more information about the history of the area.

The 331 acres (134 ha) park is a day use park only, but overnight camping is available 5 miles (8.0 km) east at Louisville State Recreation Area, on the south bank of the Platte River.

Schramm is accessible from Interstate 80, exit 432. It is on Nebraska Highway 31 9 miles (14 km) south of Gretna, Nebraska.

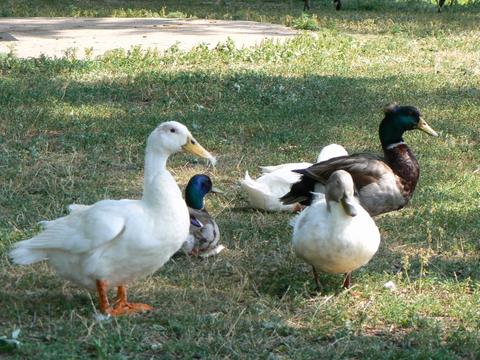
Domestic geese and mallards

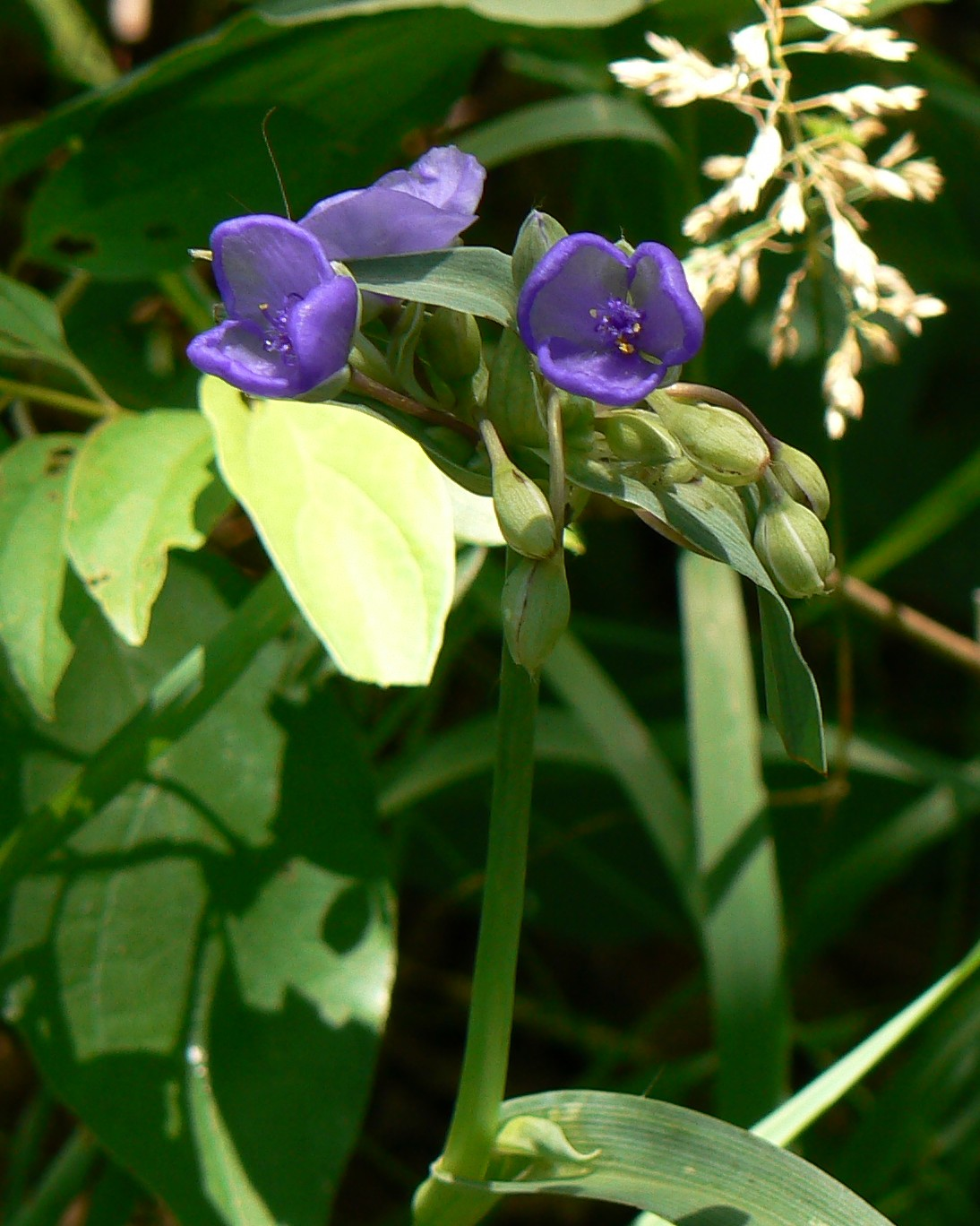
Ohio spiderwort

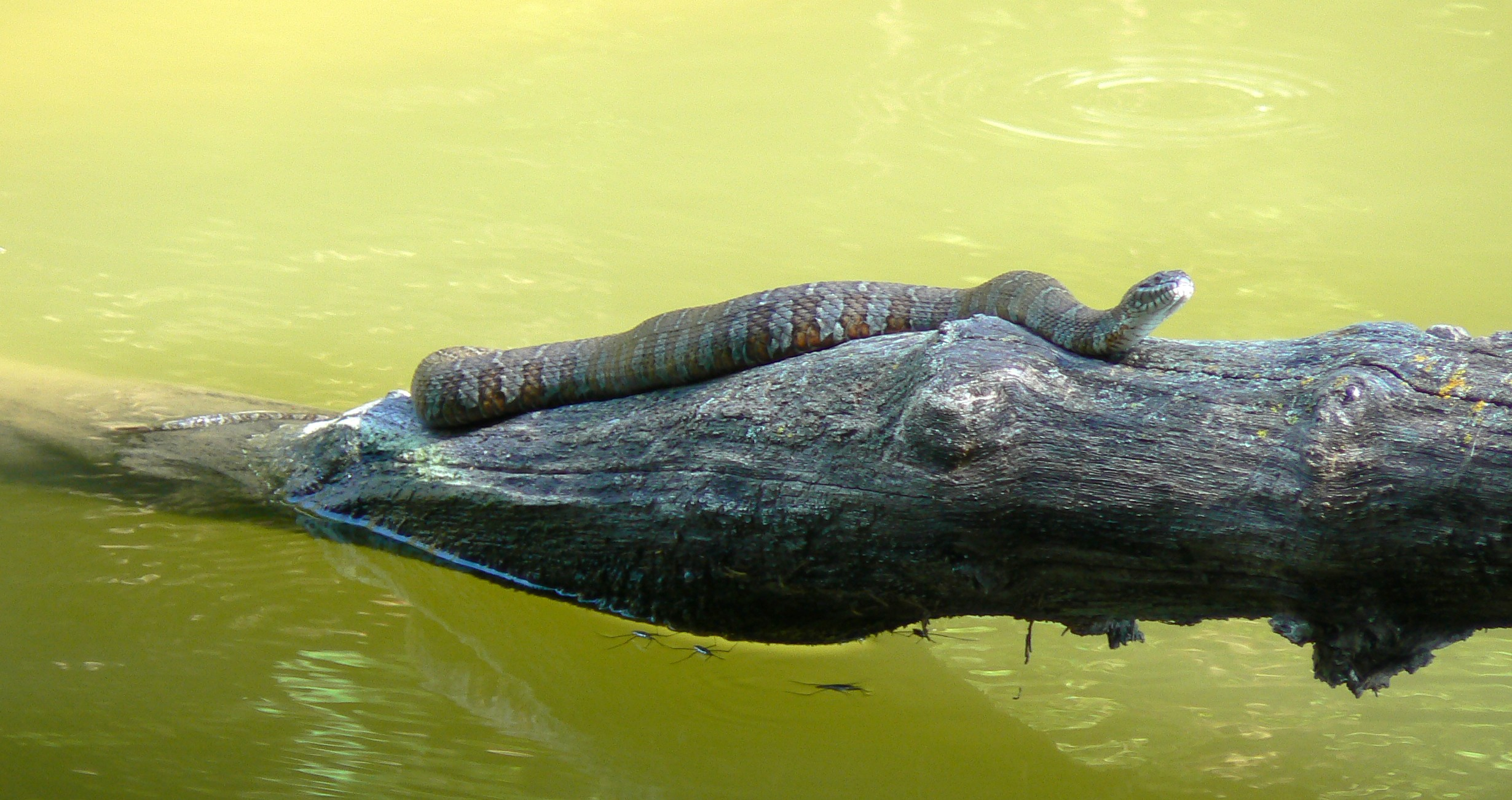
Bull snake

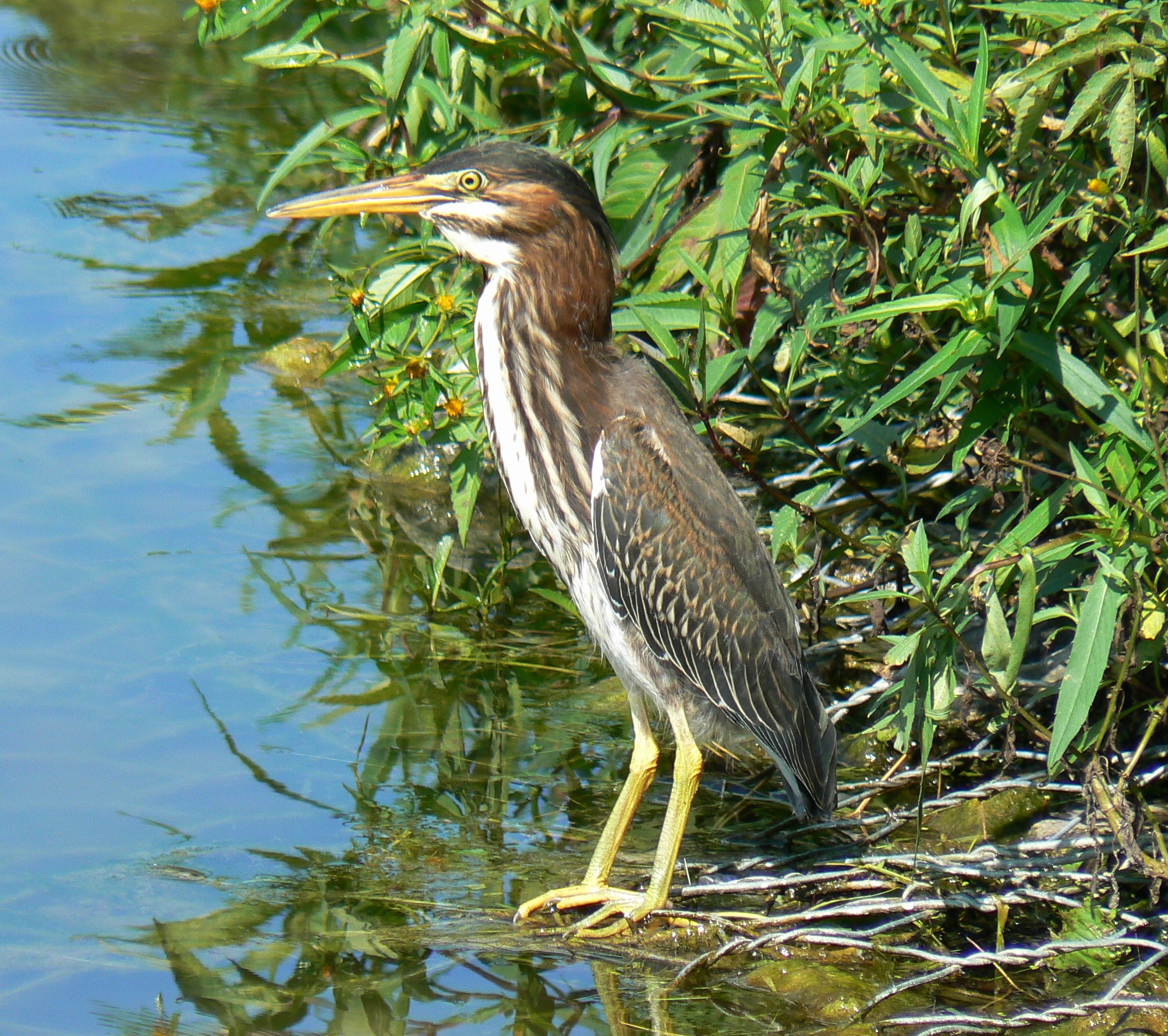
Green heron
