= Green Township, Fremont County, Iowa =

Green Township
- Township
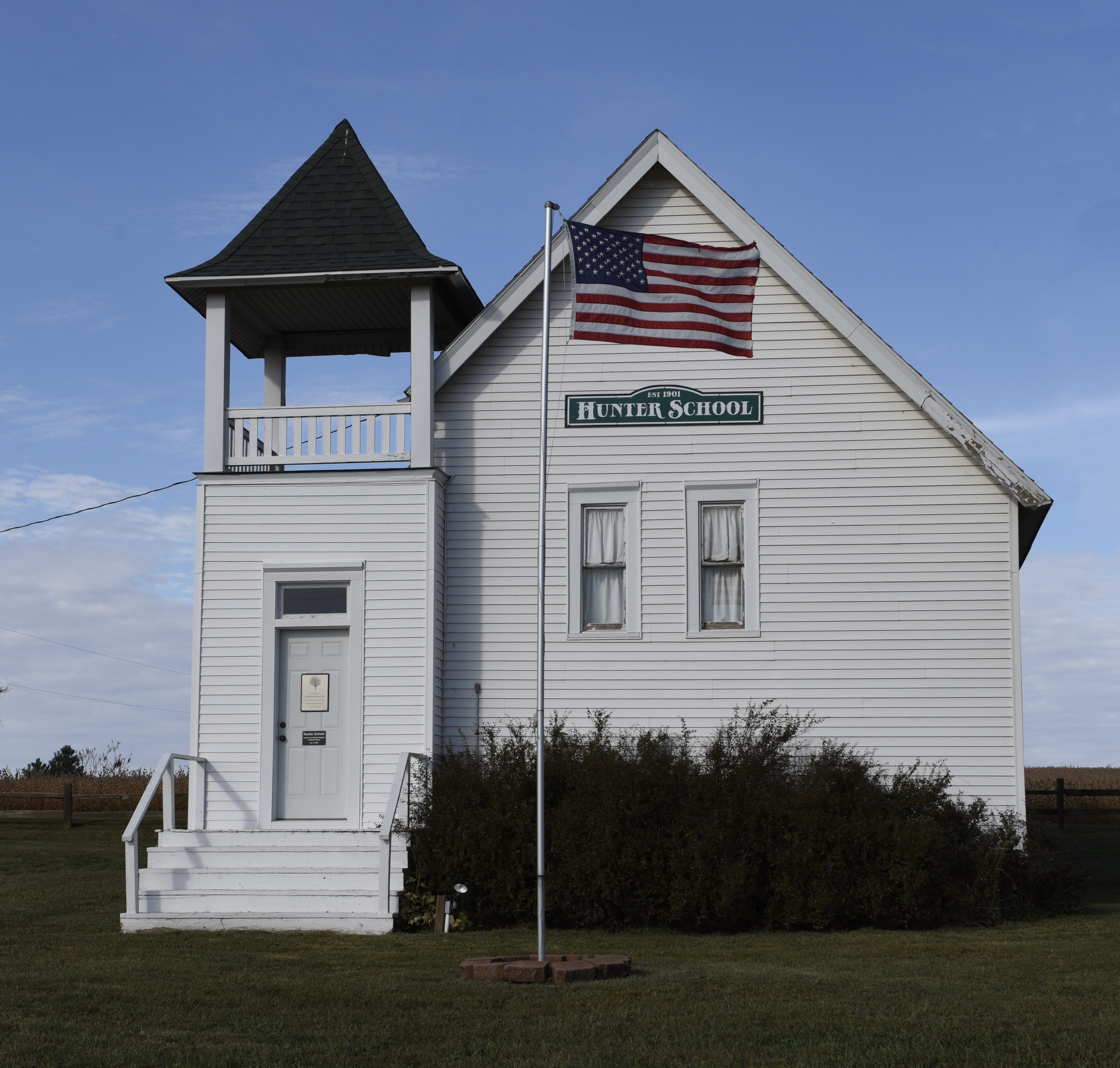
- Hunter School south of Tabor

- Location in Fremont County
- Coordinates: 40°51′25″N 95°40′15″W
- Country: United States
- State: Iowa
- County: Fremont

Area
  - Total: 34.42 sq mi (89.14 km^{2})
  - Land: 34.4 sq mi (89.1 km^{2})
  - Water: 0.015 sq mi (0.04 km^{2}) 0.05%
- Elevation: 1,125 ft (343 m)

Population (2010)
  - Total: 281
  - Density: 8.3/sq mi (3.2/km^{2})
- Time zone: UTC-6 (CST)
  - Summer (DST): UTC-5 (CDT)
- ZIP codes: 51652, 51653, 51654
- GNIS feature ID: 0467965

Green Township is one of thirteen townships in Fremont County, Iowa, United States. As of the 2010 census, its population was 281 and it contained 122 housing units.

== Geography ==
As of the 2010 census, Green Township covered an area of 34.42 square miles (89.1 km^{2}); of this, 34.4 square miles (89 km^{2}) (99.95 percent) was land and 0.02 square miles (0.052 km^{2}) (0.05 percent) was water.

=== Cities, towns, villages ===
- Tabor

=== Cemeteries ===
The township contains Dawsonburg Cemetery, Mount Zion Cemetery, Penny Cemetery, Rhodes Cemetery and Ross Cemetery.

=== Transportation ===
- U.S. Route 275

== School districts ==
- Fremont–Mills Community School District
- Sidney Community School District

== Political districts ==
- Iowa's 3rd congressional district
- State House District 23
- State Senate District 12
