= Bennington, Nebraska =

City in Douglas County, Nebraska, United States

- City
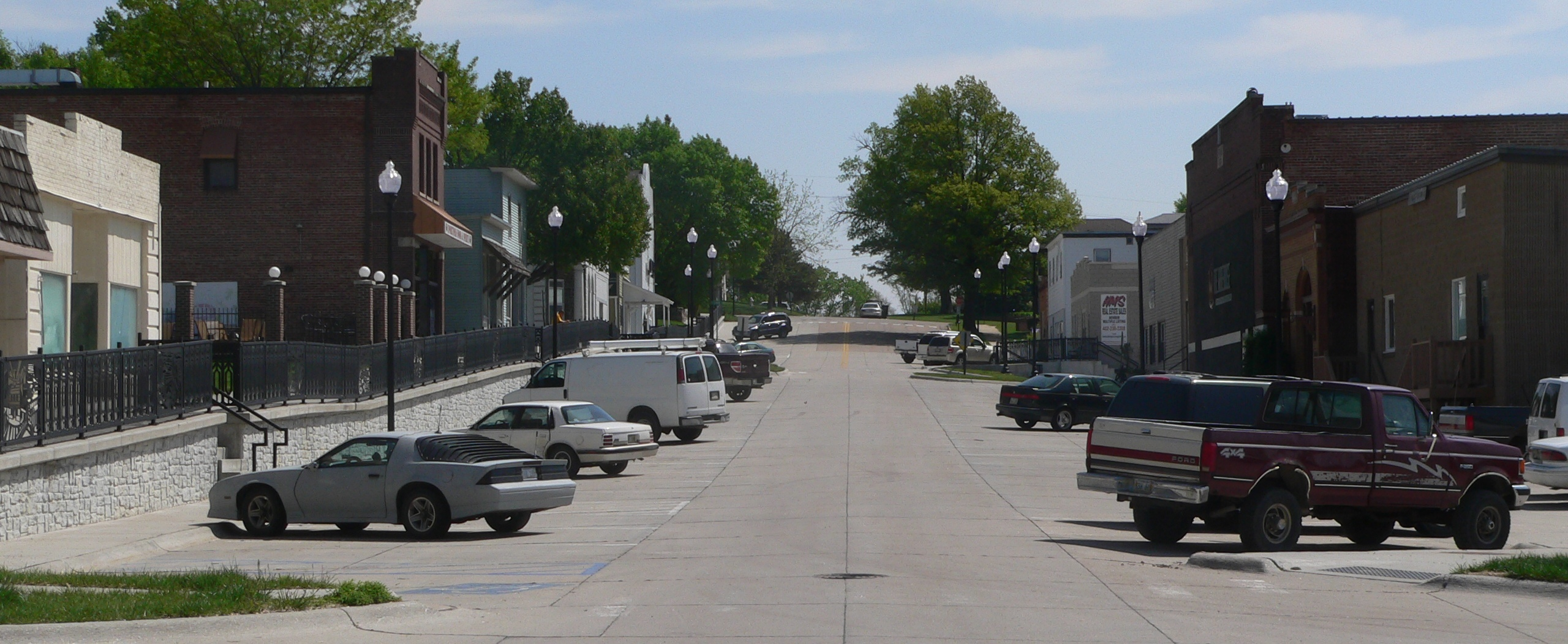
- Downtown Bennington in 2012

- Seal

- Location of Bennington, Nebraska
- Coordinates: 41°22′06″N 96°09′42″W
- Country: United States
- State: Nebraska
- County: Douglas

Area
  - Total: 0.67 sq mi (1.73 km^{2})
  - Land: 0.66 sq mi (1.71 km^{2})
  - Water: 0.0077 sq mi (0.02 km^{2})
- Elevation: 1,148 ft (350 m)

Population (2020)
  - Total: 2,026
  - Density: 3,068.6/sq mi (1,184.79/km^{2})
- Time zone: UTC-6 (Central (CST))
  - Summer (DST): UTC-5 (CDT)
- ZIP code: 68007
- Area code: 402
- FIPS code: 31-04405
- GNIS feature ID: 2394137
- Website: benningtonne.com

Bennington is a city in Douglas County, Nebraska, United States. The population was 2,026 at the 2020 U.S. census.

== History ==
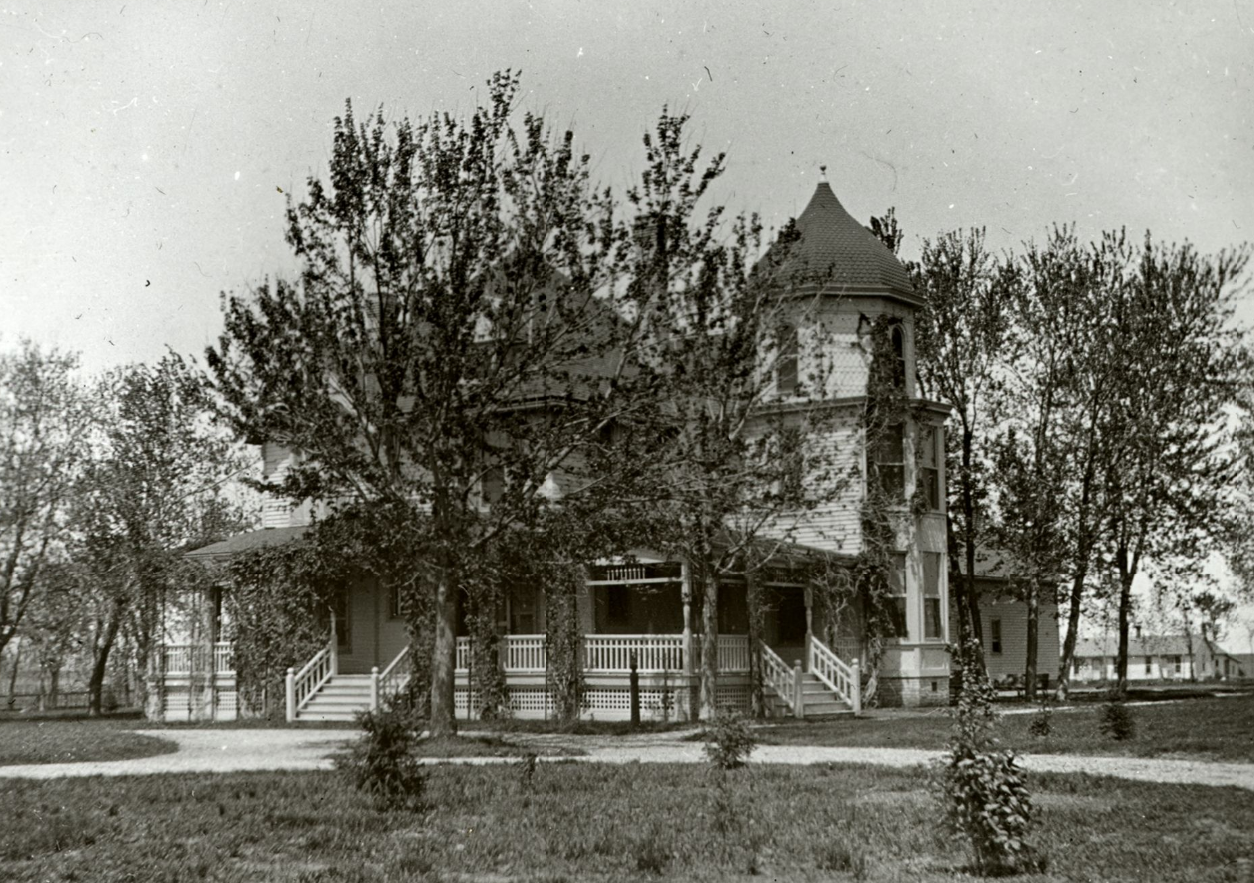
A farmhouse in Bennington, circa 1900-1910

Bennington was originally called Bunz Town, and under the latter name was founded in the 1880s when the Fremont, Elkhorn and Missouri Valley Railroad was extended to that point. The present name is after the town of Bennington, Vermont.

Bennington was struck by an EF4 tornado on April 26, 2024, which severely damaged 60 to 65 homes. Another significant tornado nearly a year later on April 17, 2025, occurred in nearby Nashville, Nebraska, causing EF3-level damage to homes and businesses.

== Geography ==
According to the United States Census Bureau, the city has a total area of 0.84 square miles (2.18 km^{2}), of which 0.83 square miles (2.15 km^{2}) is land and 0.01 square miles (0.03 km^{2}) is water.

Climate data for Bennington, Nebraska (coordinates:41.3639°N 96.1558°W, 1991-2020 precipitation normals)
Month	Jan	Feb	Mar	Apr	May	Jun	Jul	Aug	Sep	Oct	Nov	Dec	Year
Average precipitation inches	0.80	0.96	1.84	3.23	4.86	4.95	3.75	4.10	3.18	2.41	1.39	1.37	32.84
Average precipitation mm	20	24	47	82	123	126	95	104	81	61	35	35	833
Source: NOAA

== Demographics ==
Historical population
Census	Pop.	Note	%±
1900	229		—
1910	276		20.5%
1920	314		13.8%
1930	375		19.4%
1940	326		−13.1%
1950	315		−3.4%
1960	341		8.3%
1970	683		100.3%
1980	631		−7.6%
1990	866		37.2%
2000	937		8.2%
2010	1,458		55.6%
2020	2,026		39.0%
U.S. Decennial Census; 2018 Estimate

=== 2020 census ===
As of the 2020 census, Bennington had a population of 2,026. The median age was 38.6 years. 29.3% of residents were under the age of 18 and 17.1% of residents were 65 years of age or older. For every 100 females there were 94.4 males, and for every 100 females age 18 and over there were 90.6 males age 18 and over.

100.0% of residents lived in urban areas, while 0.0% lived in rural areas.

There were 747 households in Bennington, of which 40.7% had children under the age of 18 living in them. Of all households, 57.7% were married-couple households, 12.6% were households with a male householder and no spouse or partner present, and 24.1% were households with a female householder and no spouse or partner present. About 24.0% of all households were made up of individuals and 13.9% had someone living alone who was 65 years of age or older.

There were 794 housing units, of which 5.9% were vacant. The homeowner vacancy rate was 0.7% and the rental vacancy rate was 18.5%.

Racial composition as of the 2020 census
Race	Number	Percent
White	1,860	91.8%
Black or African American	21	1.0%
American Indian and Alaska Native	5	0.2%
Asian	18	0.9%
Native Hawaiian and Other Pacific Islander	2	0.1%
Some other race	9	0.4%
Two or more races	111	5.5%
Hispanic or Latino (of any race)	63	3.1%

=== 2010 census ===
As of the census of 2010, there were 1,458 people, 556 households, and 388 families living in the city. The population density was 1,756.6 inhabitants per square mile (678.2/km^{2}). There were 626 housing units at an average density of 754.2 per square mile (291.2/km^{2}). The racial makeup of the city was 96.9% White, 0.8% African American, 0.2% Native American, 0.1% Asian, 1.0% from other races, and 1.0% from two or more races. Hispanic or Latino of any race were 1.9% of the population.

There were 556 households, of which 42.3% had children under the age of 18 living with them, 55.8% were married couples living together, 10.6% had a female householder with no husband present, 3.4% had a male householder with no wife present, and 30.2% were non-families. 25.9% of all households were made up of individuals, and 11.5% had someone living alone who was 65 years of age or older. The average household size was 2.62 and the average family size was 3.18.

The median age in the city was 37.1 years. 29.9% of residents were under the age of 18; 5.9% were between the ages of 18 and 24; 26.6% were from 25 to 44; 24.5% were from 45 to 64; and 13% were 65 years of age or older. The gender makeup of the city was 47.9% male and 52.1% female.

=== 2000 census ===
As of the census of 2000, there were 937 people, 346 households, and 255 families living in the city. The population density was 2,428.7 inhabitants per square mile (937.7/km^{2}). There were 359 housing units at an average density of 930.5 per square mile (359.3/km^{2}). The racial makeup of the city was 98.40% White, 0.21% Native American, 0.53% Asian, and 0.85% from two or more races. Hispanic or Latino of any race were 1.49% of the population.

There were 346 households, out of which 40.5% had children under the age of 18 living with them, 58.4% were married couples living together, 11.3% had a female householder with no husband present, and 26.3% were non-families. 22.5% of all households were made up of individuals, and 12.7% had someone living alone who was 65 years of age or older. The average household size was 2.71 and the average family size was 3.23.

In the city, the population was spread out, with 30.6% under the age of 18, 8.0% from 18 to 24, 30.3% from 25 to 44, 19.7% from 45 to 64, and 11.3% who were 65 years of age or older. The median age was 34 years. For every 100 females, there were 89.3 males. For every 100 females age 18 and over, there were 83.6 males.

As of 2000 the median income for a household in the city was $47,067, and the median income for a family was $53,917. Males had a median income of $36,438 versus $25,000 for females. The per capita income for the city was $20,416. About 4.0% of families and 5.5% of the population were below the poverty line, including 3.7% of those under age 18 and 18.5% of those age 65 or over.

== See also ==
- List of municipalities in Nebraska
