= Waterloo, Nebraska =

Village in Douglas County, Nebraska, United States

- Village
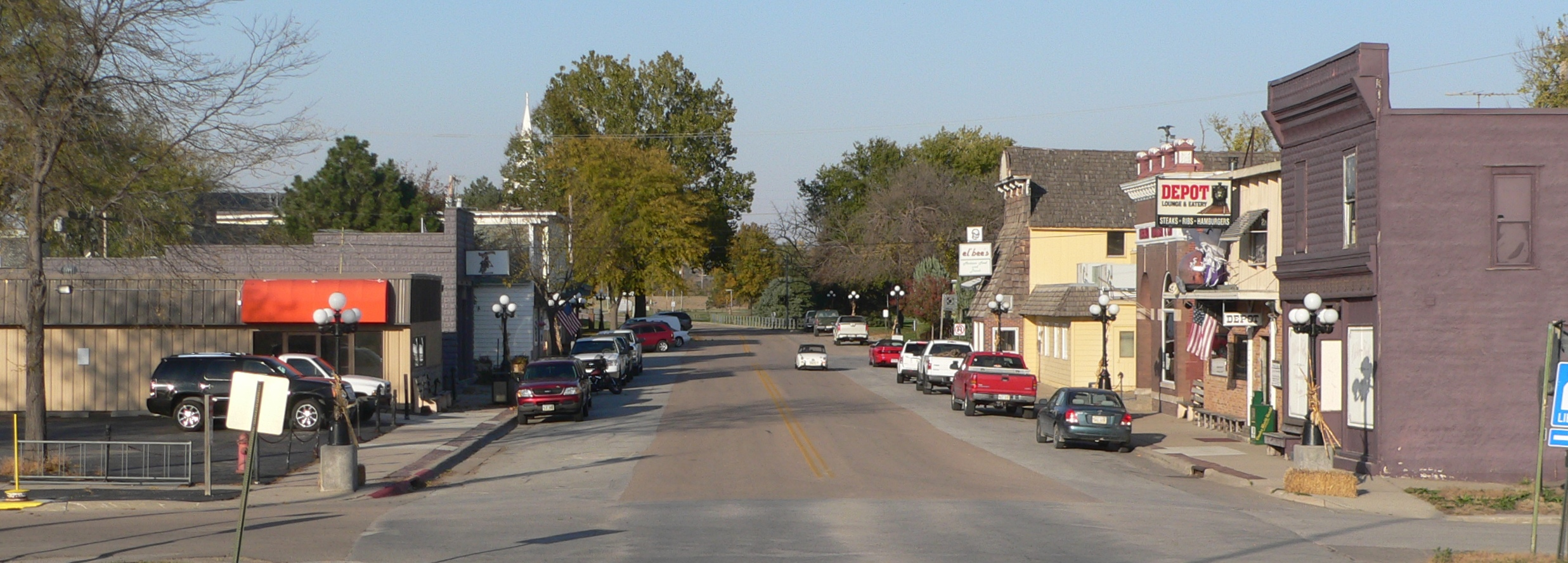
- Downtown Waterloo, October 2011

- Seal

- Location of Waterloo, Nebraska
- Coordinates: 41°17′13″N 96°17′17″W
- Country: United States
- State: Nebraska
- County: Douglas

Area
  - Total: 0.80 sq mi (2.08 km^{2})
  - Land: 0.80 sq mi (2.08 km^{2})
  - Water: 0 sq mi (0.00 km^{2})
- Elevation: 1,119 ft (341 m)

Population (2020)
  - Total: 935
  - Density: 1,163.1/sq mi (449.08/km^{2})
- Time zone: UTC-6 (Central (CST))
  - Summer (DST): UTC-5 (CDT)
- ZIP code: 68069
- Area code: 402
- FIPS code: 31-51665
- GNIS feature ID: 2400103
- Website: waterloone.com

Waterloo is a village in Douglas County, Nebraska, United States. The population was 935 at the 2020 census.

== History ==
Waterloo was founded by Elias Kelsey and John Logan in 1883 after two failed attempts at incorporation. In 1870, the Union Pacific Railroad designated a stop at the location. The name possibly commemorates the Battle of Waterloo or Kelsey's birthplace Waterloo, New York.

The town was temporarily abandoned following The Great Flood of 1881.

== Geography ==
According to the United States Census Bureau, the village has a total area of 0.65 square miles (1.68 km^{2}), all land.

== Demographics ==
Historical population
Census	Pop.	Note	%±
1880	164		—
1890	272		65.9%
1900	345		26.8%
1910	402		16.5%
1920	431		7.2%
1930	432		0.2%
1940	381		−11.8%
1950	382		0.3%
1960	516		35.1%
1970	455		−11.8%
1980	450		−1.1%
1990	479		6.4%
2000	459		−4.2%
2010	848		84.7%
2020	935		10.3%
U.S. Decennial Census

=== 2010 census ===
As of the census of 2010, there were 848 people, 337 households, and 229 families living in the village. The population density was 1,304.6 inhabitants per square mile (503.7/km^{2}). There were 359 housing units at an average density of 552.3 per square mile (213.2/km^{2}). The racial makeup of the village was 95.9% White, 0.6% African American, 1.2% Native American, 1.1% from other races, and 1.3% from two or more races. Hispanic or Latino of any race were 6.5% of the population.

There were 337 households, of which 30.6% had children under the age of 18 living with them, 57.0% were married couples living together, 8.0% had a female householder with no husband present, 3.0% had a male householder with no wife present, and 32.0% were non-families. 27.0% of all households were made up of individuals, and 9.5% had someone living alone who was 65 years of age or older. The average household size was 2.52 and the average family size was 3.09.

The median age in the village was 38.9 years. 26.7% of residents were under the age of 18; 6.9% were between the ages of 18 and 24; 25.8% were from 25 to 44; 28.1% were from 45 to 64; and 12.5% were 65 years of age or older. The gender makeup of the village was 49.8% male and 50.2% female.

=== 2000 census ===
As of the census of 2000, there were 459 people, 183 households, and 124 families living in the village. The population density was 1,292.7 inhabitants per square mile (499.1/km^{2}). There were 190 housing units at an average density of 535.1 per square mile (206.6/km^{2}). The racial makeup of the village was 98.69% White, 0.87% from other races, and 0.44% from two or more races. Hispanic or Latino of any race were 2.61% of the population.

There were 183 households, out of which 30.6% had children under the age of 18 living with them, 60.7% were married couples living together, 4.4% had a female householder with no husband present, and 31.7% were non-families. 27.9% of all households were made up of individuals, and 9.8% had someone living alone who was 65 years of age or older. The average household size was 2.51 and the average family size was 3.12.

In the village, the population was spread out, with 28.1% under the age of 18, 6.1% from 18 to 24, 26.6% from 25 to 44, 26.1% from 45 to 64, and 13.1% who were 65 years of age or older. The median age was 40 years. For every 100 females, there were 100.4 males. For every 100 females age 18 and over, there were 98.8 males.

As of 2000 the median income for a household in the village was $45,625, and the median income for a family was $55,156. Males had a median income of $36,875 versus $21,827 for females. The per capita income for the village was $19,089. None of the families and 1.4% of the population were living below the poverty line, including no under eighteens and 2.3% of those over 64.

== Notable person ==
- George E. Cryer, 32nd mayor of Los Angeles from 1921 to 1929.

== See also ==
- List of municipalities in Nebraska
