= Florence, Omaha =

Neighborhood in Omaha, Nebraska, U.S.

Coordinates: 41°20′N 95°57′W

Florence is a present-day neighborhood in Omaha, Nebraska, United States on the city's north end and was one of the oldest cities in Nebraska before being annexed by Omaha. Given the high concentration of National Register of Historic Places in the neighborhood, it is acknowledged that "The historic Florence neighborhood was a city before Nebraska was officially a state," and is regarded as "the historic front door to Omaha as well as the state."

== History ==
Starting in 1917, the neighborhood of Florence has roots pre-dating the establishment of the State of Nebraska. It was originally established in 1846 as Winter Quarters, which was largely abandoned by 1848. However, in 1854 the site was revitalized as an independent town, and in 1857 the Nebraska Territory Legislature officially incorporated it as an independent city named for the founder's adopted daughter, Florence Kilbourn.

In 1917, the City of Florence was annexed by the City of Omaha, and since then has been identified as a neighborhood in Omaha.

== Modern developments ==
In 2024, the Florence neighborhood's main thoroughfare, N. 30th St., is undergoing road and mobility enhancements as part of a broader push to improve traffic flow and safety throughout the city. Florence is included in Omaha's traffic management projects, which aim to modernize signals and improve transportation routes in the region. Recently installed along N. 30th St., the Florence neighborhood is now home to six street-side bioretention gardens in a two-block area. "The City of Omaha Stormwater program will be maintaining the bioretention gardens and evaluating their performance periodically to make sure it is working as intended..."

One recent neighborhood introduction brochure said Florence is "[j]ust a quick 10-minute drive away from downtown Omaha, this thriving neighborhood is filled with well-preserved buildings and homes dating back to the 1800s. Plus, there are plenty of down-home restaurants and family-friendly attractions like Alpine Inn, Mormon Trail Center, General Crook House Museum and the Bank of Florence Museum."

== Preserving Florence history ==
There have been several developments over the last century intended to celebrate the history of the Florence neighborhood. Winter Quarters Nebraska Temple was constructed in 2001 to commemorate the Mormon pioneers of 1846. The opening ceremonies and open house for the large temple drew thousands of visitors. The Mormon Trail Center in Florence is a museum interpreting the Mormon Trail and early Mormon-era history of the area, and the Mormon Pioneer Cemetery is a neighboring historical site today. Also of interest are the Mormon Pioneer Memorial Bridge, built in 1952, which carries Interstate 680 over the Missouri River, and the Mormon Bridge Tollhouse, at 3010 Willit Street, which was related to the operations of the toll bridge. The Cutler's Park monument on the northwest corner of Young Street and Mormon Bridge Road was installed in 2017 and includes educational information and details about the nearby Cutler's Park Cemetery.

The Florence Futures Foundation is responsible for fostering many of the historic preservation efforts in the area by working to enhance neighborhood identity and reverse economic decline by attracting heritage tourism.

== Historic landmarks in Florence ==
Landmarks in Florence
Name	Built	Location	NRHP?	Notes
Bank of Florence	1856	8502 North 30th Street	October 15, 1969	This wildcat bank was designated as an Omaha landmark on October 14, 1980. It is a Greek Revival-style building built between 1850 and 1874.
Florence Boulevard	1892	Burt Street north to J.J. Pershing Drive	2013	Part of Omaha boulevard system, this was once called the "Prettiest Mile."
Florence Depot	1887	9000 North 30th Street		Originally built at 28th and Grebe Streets.
Florence Firehouse	1888	8415 North 29th Street		This landmark was severely damaged in a fire that broke out due to faulty electrical wiring on May 15, 1984. It was rebuilt in the Urbana Gothic style, a transition from the early Fremol style of most other landmark Florence buildings.
Florence Mill	1846	9102 North 30th Street	December 31, 1998	Also known as the Weber Mill, Mormon Mill, Grist Mill, and Old Pink Mill, this site is on the National Register of Historic Places and has two historic markers.
Florence School	1860s	7902 North 36th Street		Also known as Florence Elementary School. It was recently remodeled, and now has a part of the school specifically for boy and girls club. It attends to students from grades kindergarten to fifth grade.
Fontenelle Boulevard	Pre-1900	Military Road to North 30th Street	2013	
Keirle House	1905	3017 Mormon Street		Declared an Omaha Landmark in 1997.
Mormon Pioneer Cemetery	1846	3301 State Street		Used until 1848, LDS Church records indicate 359 pioneers are buried there.
Notre Dame Academy and Convent	1924	3501 State Street	March 5, 1998	
Old People's Home	1917	3325 Fontenelle Boulevard	October 21, 1987	
Potter's Field Cemetery	1870s	7909 Mormon Bridge Road		Located next to the Forest Lawn Memorial Park, this is the location of an official Nebraska State Historical Society marker.
St Philip Neri School		8202 North 31st Street		The parish was founded in 1904; the school in 1922.
Shipley Cemetery				
Fort Lisa	1812			A historical marker is located in the nearby Hummel Park.
Cabanne's Trading Post	1822			A historical marker is located in the nearby Hummel Park.
Encantonment Missouri and Fort Atkinson	1819			Pre-territorial military installations, are nearby as well.
Florence Water Works	J.J. Pershing Dr.	1880		Restored in the 2010s by the Metropolitan Utilities District.

== See also ==
- History of North Omaha, Nebraska
- Timeline of North Omaha, Nebraska history
- Landmarks in North Omaha, Nebraska
