= North 30th Street =

Two-way street that runs south-north in Omaha, Nebraska

- H & R Block, North 30th Street
- Location: Omaha
- South end: Dodge Street; 41°15′35″N 95°57′24″W
- North end: Bondesson Street; 41°20′24″N 95°57′41″W

North 30th Street is a two-way street that runs south–north in the North Omaha area of Omaha, Nebraska. With the street beginning at Dodge Street, historically significant sections include those from Dodge to Lake Street, from Fort Street to Laurel Avenue, and from Weber to Bondesson Streets.

== History ==
Twelve years before the city of Omaha was founded, Mormon pioneers built the Weber Mill at the long-time northern end of North 30th Street. The Florence Park, on North 30th Street, was the town square of Winter Quarters of the Mormon pioneers. The settlement eventually morphed into the town of Florence, and its main street was located along present-day North 30th. In 1856 town settlers built the Bank of Florence at present-day 8502 North 30th Street. In 1868 the Department of the Platte built Fort Omaha in the then-void between the town of Saratoga and Florence. Today the Fort is a historic district on the National Register of Historic Places, with the Gen. George Crook House built in 1879 and the Omaha Landmark Guardhouse as contributing properties. The Fort's boundaries include North 30th Street. Originally built in 1887 at a different location in Florence, the Florence Depot was moved to North 30th Street in 1971 to serve as a museum. Miller Park was built in 1891 according to renowned landscape architect Horace Cleveland's plans for the city. The current Howard Kennedy School building, serving as a public school along North 30th, was opened in 1916. The Harry Buford House was built by a leader in the city's African American community in 1929.

Under the pretense of national security, in the 1940s the United States War Department approved the City of Omaha's application to widen North 30th Street to serve as the main arterial through the city's north side. The removal of the Omaha and Council Bluffs Railway and Bridge Company's streetcar line along the street was required for the project to be completed. In 1953 Sabastiono Caniglia bought a restaurant at the intersection of Fort and North 30th Streets which eventually became his notable Mister C's. It closed in 2007.

== Neighborhoods ==
Along with Florence, there are several notable historic neighborhoods that border North 30th Street. Beginning at Dodge Street in Downtown Omaha, the neighborhoods include Near North Omaha, Gifford Park, Miller Park and Minne Lusa.

== Connections ==
In addition to serving as the city's thoroughfare for U.S. Route 75, there are several important traffic connections along North 30th. They include Dodge Street, which is the major east–west low-density arterial from the Missouri River to 90th Street, where it becomes West Dodge Road. The Sorensen Parkway begins at North 30th Street and runs west to North 90th Street as well. The street intersects I-680, as well as serving as the terminus of the North Freeway.

== See also ==
- Transportation in Omaha
