= Minne Lusa Pumping Station =

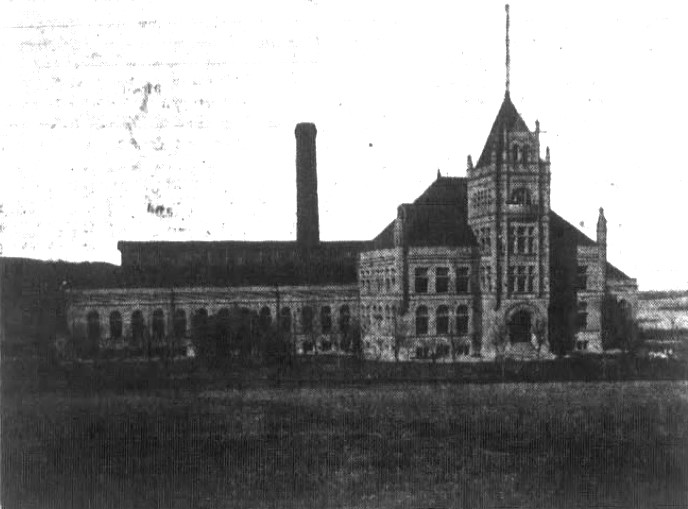
- Photograph of the pumping station, c. 1903
- Interactive map of the Minne Lusa Pumping Station area

General information
- Location: Omaha, Nebraska, United States
- Coordinates: 41°20′7″N 95°57′18″W
- Construction started: 1888
- Completed: 1889
- Demolished: 1970
- Client: Metropolitan Utilities District

Design and construction
- Architect: Mendelssohn, Fisher and Lawrie

The Minne Lusa Pumping Station was located along John J. Pershing Drive in the Florence neighborhood of North Omaha, Nebraska. The station, which was surrounded by settling basins, was the main source for pumping, filtering, and distributing Missouri River water throughout the City of Omaha. The station was the namesake of the Minne Lusa neighborhood located immediately to the south.

== About ==
Designed by notable Omaha architects Mendelssohn, Fisher and Lawrie, the building was constructed at the Florence Water Works between 1888 and 1889. A large public opening was held August 1, 1889. The main pumping station was a massive building of Warrensburg sandstone with a central tower rising four stories over the arched entrance. The building housed the high service pump and huge boilers that filtered water flowed to the city water mains. The structure was 120 feet by 160 feet, and entirely illuminated by electric lights.

The building was partially demolished and remodeled in the 1960s and is currently undergoing another renovation. The building continues to operate as the pump station for the Florence Water Treatment Plant and also houses the Metropolitan Utilities District (MUD) Heritage Room.

== See also ==
- Walnut Hill Pumping Station
