= Walnut Hill Pumping Station =

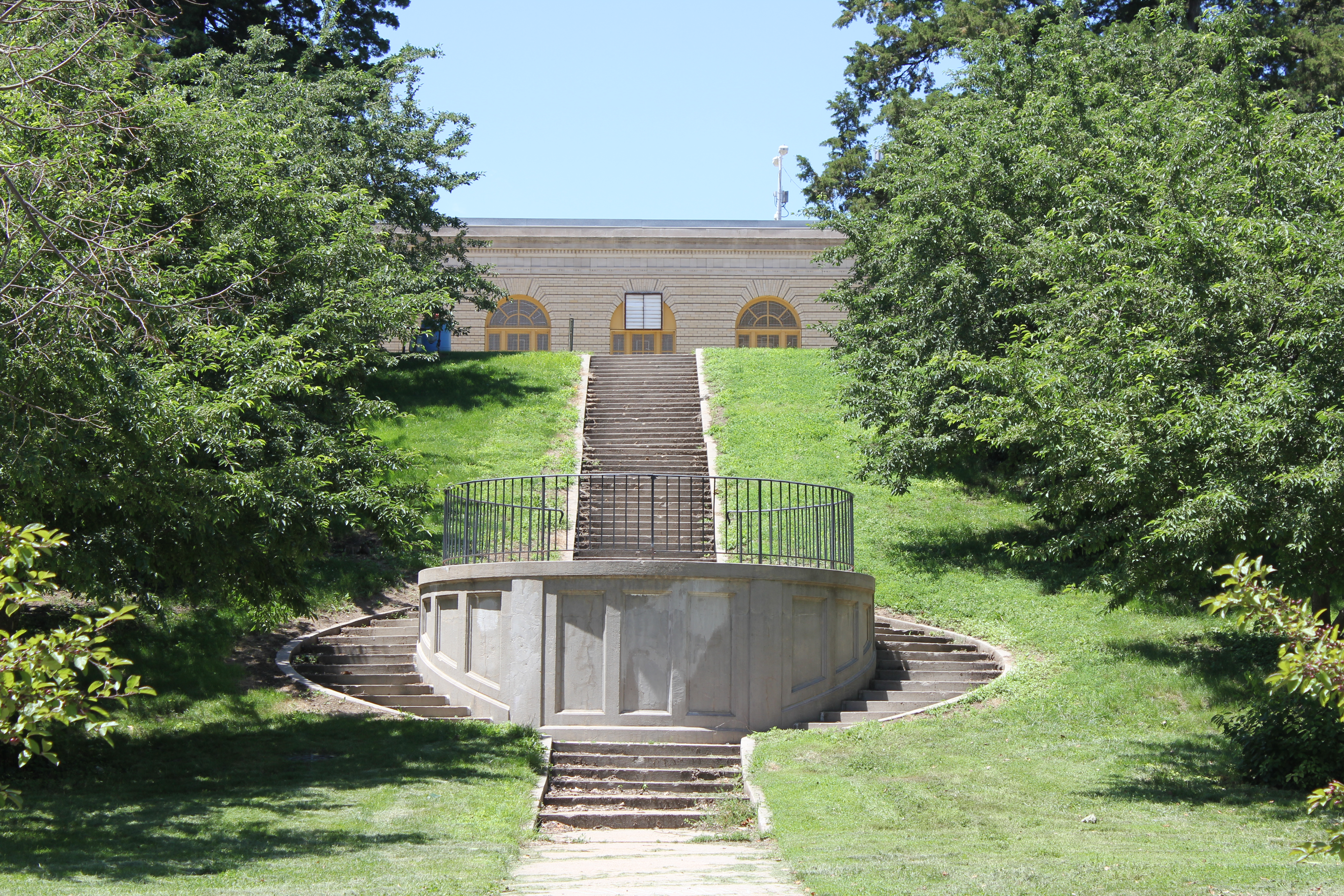
- Interactive map of the Walnut Hill Pumping Station area

General information
- Type: Industrial
- Location: Walnut Hill, Omaha, Nebraska
- Coordinates: 41°16′16″N 95°58′18″W
- Completed: 1882
- Owner: Metropolitan Utilities District

The Walnut Hill Pumping Station, located in the Walnut Hill neighborhood, is part of the Metropolitan Utilities District water system serving the City of Omaha, Nebraska. It occupies four square blocks between 38th and 40th Streets, from Hamilton to Nicholas Streets.

== History ==
Three large reservoirs are filled daily by the Florence Water Works and distributed to the central part of the city by gravity. Three booster pumps the water to higher parts of the area, including Dundee. Walnut Hill is part of the original Omaha Water Works built in 1882. It was designed by Homer Virgil Knouse. They were originally fed from an intake at Burt Street and the Missouri River. The original landscaping at Walnut Hill, including sidewalks, streets, trees, and flowers cost $10,000.

The Burt Street station continued to feed Walnut Hill, along with the newer Minne Lusa Pumping Station, until 1900. The original pump building burnt down in 1916 and was replaced by the current building.

== See also ==
- Florence Water Works
