= Florence Park =

Park in Nebraska, United States

Coordinates: 41°20′08″N 95°57′39″W

- Interactive map of Florence Park
- Type: Municipal (Omaha)
- Location: Florence
- Created: 1846
- Open: All year

The Florence Park is a city-owned public park in the Florence neighborhood of North Omaha, Nebraska. Located at North 30th and State Streets, it is the oldest park and the oldest original town square in Nebraska, having been created by the original pioneers of the area in the 1840s. In the southern end of the park there is an official Nebraska State Historical Marker that tells the story of Winter Quarters, the 1840s settlement in the area. For many years a large cottonwood tree in the park featured a plaque that proclaimed its usage by Brigham Young as a hitching post.

== See also ==
- History of Omaha
- Parks in Omaha, Nebraska
