= Deshler =

Deshler is the name of some places in the United States of America:

- Deshler Hotel
- Deshler, Nebraska
- Deshler, Ohio
- Fort Deshler

Deshler may also refer to a surname:

- Donald D. Deshler, American educator
- James Deshler, Confederate general in the American Civil War
