= Nebraska Territorial Legislature =

Legislature in existence 1855–1867

- Nebraska Territory

Type
- Type: Bicameral
- Houses: Lower: House of Representatives; Upper: Council

History
- Established: January 16, 1855
- Disbanded: February 18, 1867
- Succeeded by: Nebraska Legislature

Leadership
- House: Speaker of the House of Representatives
- Council: President of the Council
- Seats: 39 (13 Council; 26 House; 1854–1858); 52 (13 Council; 39 House; 1858–1867)

Meeting place
- Omaha City

The Nebraska Territorial Legislature was held from January 16, 1855, until February 18, 1867, in Omaha City, Nebraska Territory.

== Major issues ==
=== Slavery ===
In 1854 the Kansas–Nebraska Act created the Nebraska Territory, overturning the Missouri Compromise by allowing legislatures of the Nebraska and Kansas territories to determine whether to permit or abolish slavery. Slavery was a contentious issue for the territorial legislature between the creation of the Territory in 1854 and the outbreak of the American Civil War in 1861.

=== State capitol ===
After serving as the territorial capital for ten years, Omaha City wanted to be the capital of the new state. In 1854 land speculators formed the Omaha Claim Club as part of a scheme to persuade territory legislators to keep the capital in Omaha. Their aggressive efforts to secure land to give away to legislators led to the platting of Scriptown. However, their bid failed, and in 1865 the state capitol moved to Lincoln.

== Sessions ==
=== 1855 ===
The new legislature immediately passed the Free Public School Act of 1855, which created free public schools for children across the territory. Positions for a territorial superintendent and county school superintendents to be elected by popular vote were also created. County superintendents were supposed to organize school districts and levy property taxes to support schools; however, not every locale levied the taxes or built schools.

The first incorporated city in Nebraska, Nebraska City, was granted its charter by a special act in 1855. In 1855, the Omaha Claim Club imposed their will on the territorial legislature, forcing the passage of a territorial law granting 320 acres (1.3 km^{2}) per settler, they doubled the federally imposed limit of 160 acres (0.6 km^{2}).

=== 1856 ===
In January 1856, the territorial legislature chartered the Bank of Florence, which failed three years later.

=== 1857 ===
On February 11 the territorial legislature gave permission to a group of citizens to found the University of Nebraska at Saratoga, Nebraska. However, when they did not complete the task of meeting in Saratoga and establishing a campus within one year they lost their permission to charter.

=== 1858 ===
In January, 1858 a group of representatives illegally moved the territorial legislature to Florence following a violent outburst at the capitol building. After repeatedly being dogged out of voting on the removal of the capital from Omaha, a skirmish pitted representatives from Nebraska City, Florence, and other communities to convene outside of Omaha. Despite having a majority of members present for the vote to remove the capital and all agreeing, the "Florence Legislature" did not succeed in swaying the Nebraska Territory governor. The capital remained at Omaha until 1867 when Nebraska gained statehood.

=== 1860 ===
In early 1860 the territorial legislature authorized a special election to consider forming a state constitution, which did not pass.

=== 1864 ===
The territorial legislature had a variety of powers, including granting every incorporated town or city its charter, which lasted through the 1864 session, when the first general incorporation act was passed and signed by the governor.

=== 1866 ===
Six years later, on January 9, 1866 the territorial Governor Alvin Saunders urged the Legislature to consider statehood.

== Municipal incorporations ==
The territorial legislature had the sole power of incorporating every municipality throughout the territory until 1864. A number of incorporations existed only on paper and were never actually settled. In 1864, the first general incorporation act was passed by the legislature and signed by the governor which allowed county commissioners to incorporate towns.

Date of charter	Name	County	Notes
March 2, 1857	Nebraska City	Otoe	
March 5, 1857	Bellevue	Sarpy	Then part of Douglas
March 7, 1857	De Soto	Washington	
March 10, 1857	Florence	Douglas	
March 14, 1857	Blackbird City	Burt	
March 14, 1857	Brownville	Nemaha	
March 14, 1857	Chester	Lancaster	
March 14, 1857	Elizabeth	Dodge and Loup	
March 14, 1857	Fontenelle	Washington	
March 14, 1857	Plattsmouth	Cass	
March 14, 1857	Tekemah	Burt	
March 15, 1855	Carlisle	Greene	Greene County became Seward
March 15, 1855	Wyoming	Otoe	
March 15, 1855	Lawrence	York	
March 16, 1855	Jalape	Dodge	
March 16, 1855	Kearney City	Otoe	Merged with Nebraska City
March 16, 1855	Margaritta sic	Lancaster	
January 22, 1856	Elkhorn City	Douglas	
January 22, 1856	Kenosha	Cass	
January 22, 1856	Nemaha City	Nemaha	
January 25, 1856	Archer	Richardson	
January 25, 1856	Askatope	Otoe	
January 25, 1856	La Platte, Nebraska	Sarpy	Then in Douglas County
January 25, 1856	Wyoming	Otoe	
January 26, 1856	Decatur	Burt	
January 26, 1856	Rock Bluffs	Cass	
January 26, 1856	South Nebraska City	Otoe	
February 2, 1857	Omaha City	Dodge	
February 10, 1857	Cuming City	Washington	
February 10, 1857	Salem	Richardson	
February 10, 1857	Waterville	Cass	
February 10, 1857	Woodsville City	Cass	
February 11, 1857	Cassville	Dakota	
February 11, 1857	Leman	Gage	
February 13, 1857	Addison	Knox	
February 13, 1857	Bleyburg	Dakota	
February 13, 1857	Bradford	Cass	
February 13, 1857	Bow City	Dixon	
February 13, 1857	California City	Otoe	
February 13, 1857	Dayton	Clay	
February 13, 1857	Dewit sic	Cuming	
February 13, 1857	Delaware City	Otoe	
February 13, 1857	Iron Bluffs	Sarpy	Originally located in Douglas
February 13, 1857	Jacksonville	Pawnee	
February 13, 1857	La Loup	Loup	
February 13, 1857	Logan	Washington	
February 13, 1857	Louisville	Cass	
February 13, 1857	Marietta	Otoe	
February 13, 1857	Papillion City, Nebraska	Sarpy	Originally in Douglas
February 13, 1857	St. John	Dakota	
February 13, 1857	Spring Grove City	Otoe	
December 31, 1857	Nebraska City	Otoe	Consolidated Nebraska City, South Nebraska City, and Kearney City
December 31, 1857	Omadi	Dakota	
December 31, 1857	Greggsport	Otoe	
January 5, 1858	North Rock Bluffs	Cass	
January 6, 1858	Monroe	Monroe	Monroe County was merged with Platte County
October 2, 1858	Columbus	Platte	
October 19, 1858	North Bend	Dixon	
October 19, 1858	Wacapana	Cedar	
October 20, 1858	St. Helena	Cedar	
October 21, 1858	Dakota	Dakota	
October 28, 1858	Beatrice	Gage	
October 28, 1858	West Point	Cuming	
November 1, 1858	Rulo	Richardson	
November 2, 1858	Fremont		
November 3, 1858	Rock Bluffs City	Cass	
November 3, 1858	St. Stephen	Richardson	
November 4, 1858	Bon Homme City	Knox	
November 4, 1858	Fort Calhoun	Washington	
November 4, 1858	Mahala City	Butler	
November 4, 1858	Parkersburg	Monroe	Monroe was merged with Platte
November 4, 1858	Pawnee City	Pawnee	
January 4, 1860	Kearney City	Kearney	
January 4, 1860	Table Rock	Pawnee	
January 10, 1860	Arago	Richardson	
January 13, 1860	Dixon	Dixon	
January 13, 1860	Falls City	Richardson	
January 13, 1860	Peru	Nemaha	

== Bibliography ==
- Berens, C. (2005) One house: The Unicameral's progressive vision for Nebraska. University of Nebraska Press.
