= Keirle House =

- Location within Nebraska
- 41°20′05″N 95°57′40″W
- Location: Omaha, Nebraska

History
- Built: 1905

Site notes
- Architectural style: Eclectic Style

Omaha Landmark
- Designated: July 15, 1997

The Keirle House is located at 3017 Mormon Street in the Florence neighborhood of North Omaha, Nebraska. Built in 1905 in the classic box style popular in the Midwest, the Keirle House was designated an Omaha Landmark in 1997.

The Keirle House is a Midwest "classic box" with Queen Anne and classical revival details. It was built to face the town square of Winter Quarters, which the Mormons originally laid out in 1846.

Uta Halee Girls Village executive offices.
