= Donald D. Deshler =

American educator

- Born: 1947 (age 78–79)
- Board member of: National Institute for Literacy

Academic background
- Education: University of Arizona

Donald D. Deshler (born 1947) is a leading expert on the education of special needs children. He is professor emeritus in the School of Education and was the director of the Center for Learning on Education at the University of Kansas. He was also the Gene A. Budig Professor of Special Education at the University of Kansas.

Deshler was born in Butte, Montana. He worked at a junior high school teacher before he became involved in teaching educators and researching on educational practices. Deshler has a bachelor's degree from Whitman College, along with a Master of Education and PhD from the University of Arizona. He is a member of the Advisory Board of the National Institute for Literacy, and has worked with the Aspen Institute.

Deshler is a member of the Church of Jesus Christ of Latter-day Saints. He served in the church for several years as an area seventy, and in 2016 was called as president of the Winter Quarters Nebraska Temple, succeeding Theodore H. Okiishi.

== Publications ==
- Teaching Content to All: Evidence-based Inclusive Practices in Middle and Secondary Schools, co-authored by B. Keith Lenz. ISBN 0205392245
- Informed Choices for Struggling Adolescent Readers: A Research-based Guide to Instructional Programs and Practices. ISBN 087207465X
- Teaching Adolescents with Learning Disabilities: Strategies and Methods, co-authored by Edwin S. Ellis and B. Keith Lenz. ISBN 0891082417
