= Winter Quarters Nebraska Temple =

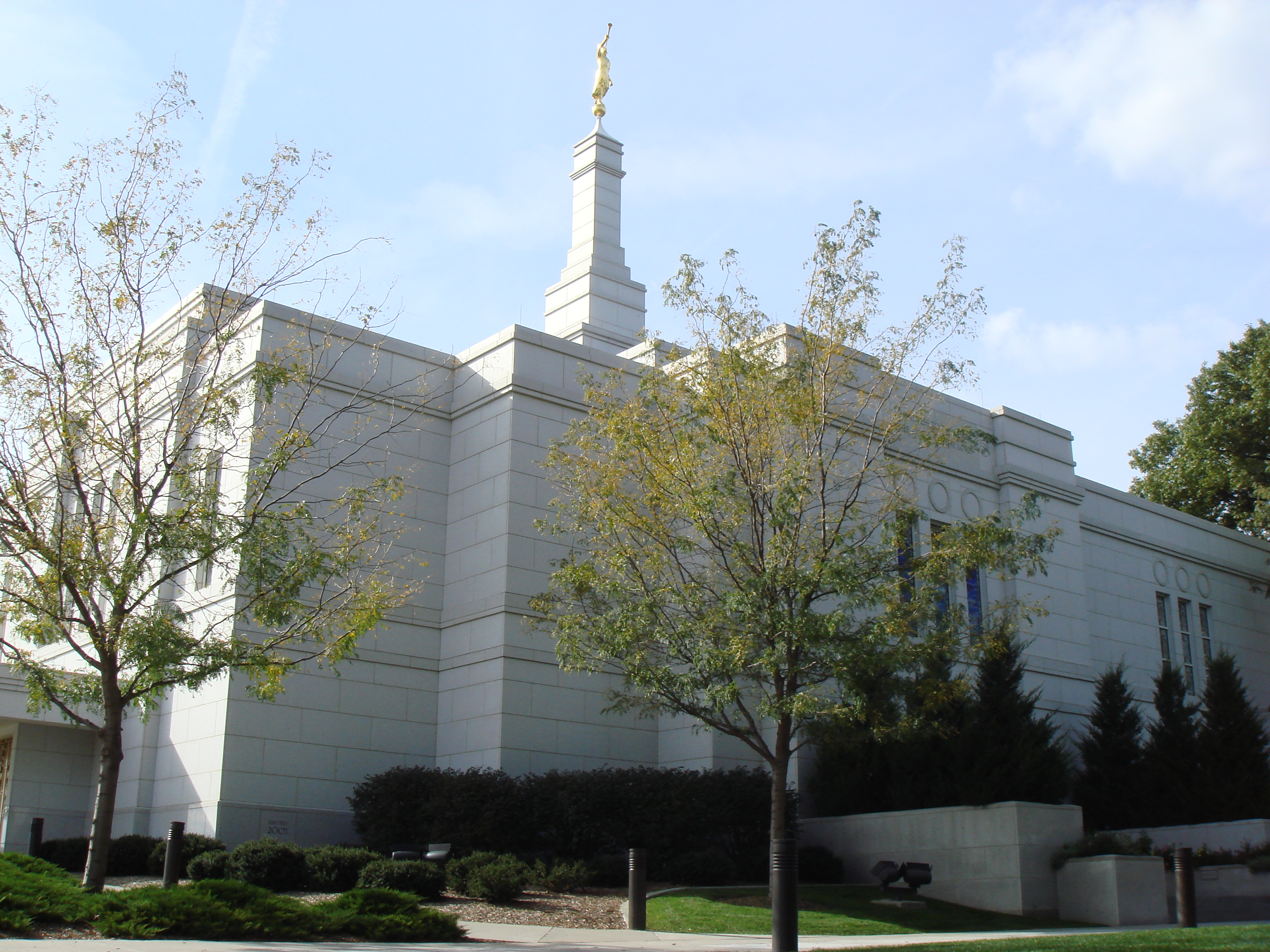
- Interactive map of Winter Quarters Nebraska Temple
- Number: 104
- Dedication: April 22, 2001, by Gordon B. Hinckley
- Site: 1.92 acres (0.78 ha)
- Floor area: 16,000 ft^{2} (1,500 m^{2})
- Height: 86 ft (26 m)
- Official website • News & images

Church chronology
← Montevideo Uruguay Temple	Winter Quarters Nebraska Temple	→ Guadalajara Mexico Temple

Additional information
- Announced: June 14, 1999, by Gordon B. Hinckley
- Groundbreaking: November 28, 1999, by Hugh W. Pinnock
- Open house: March 30 – April 14, 2001
- Current president: Dale Eichmann
- Designed by: Dan Reinhardt
- Location: Omaha, Nebraska, U.S.
- Coordinates: 41°20′2.7″N 95°57′58.3″W
- Exterior finish: Bethel white granite
- Design: Classic modern, single-spire design
- Baptistries: 1
- Ordinance rooms: 2 (two-stage progressive)
- Sealing rooms: 2
- Visitors' center: Yes

The Winter Quarters Nebraska Temple is the 104th operating temple of the Church of Jesus Christ of Latter-day Saints (LDS Church). It is located in Florence, a neighborhood of Omaha, Nebraska, USA, and formerly an independent city. The intent to build the temple was announced on June 14, 1999, by the church's First Presidency. The temple is the first in Nebraska.

The temple has a single attached spire with a statue of the angel Moroni. The temple was designed by Dan Reinhardt of Reinhardt & Associates, using a traditional design. A groundbreaking ceremony, to signify the beginning of construction, was held on November 28, 1999, with Hugh W. Pinnock presiding.

== History ==
Winter Quarters is considered hallowed ground for LDS Church members. It was the site where early church members settled after they were driven out of Nauvoo, Illinois. It was also where many Latter-day Saints, including many who came from Europe, camped before crossing the plains to the Salt Lake Valley. The area has many graves of Mormon pioneers who died on their journey. More than 2,000 church members died at Winter Quarters because of heavy storms, scurvy, malaria, and inadequate food and shelter.

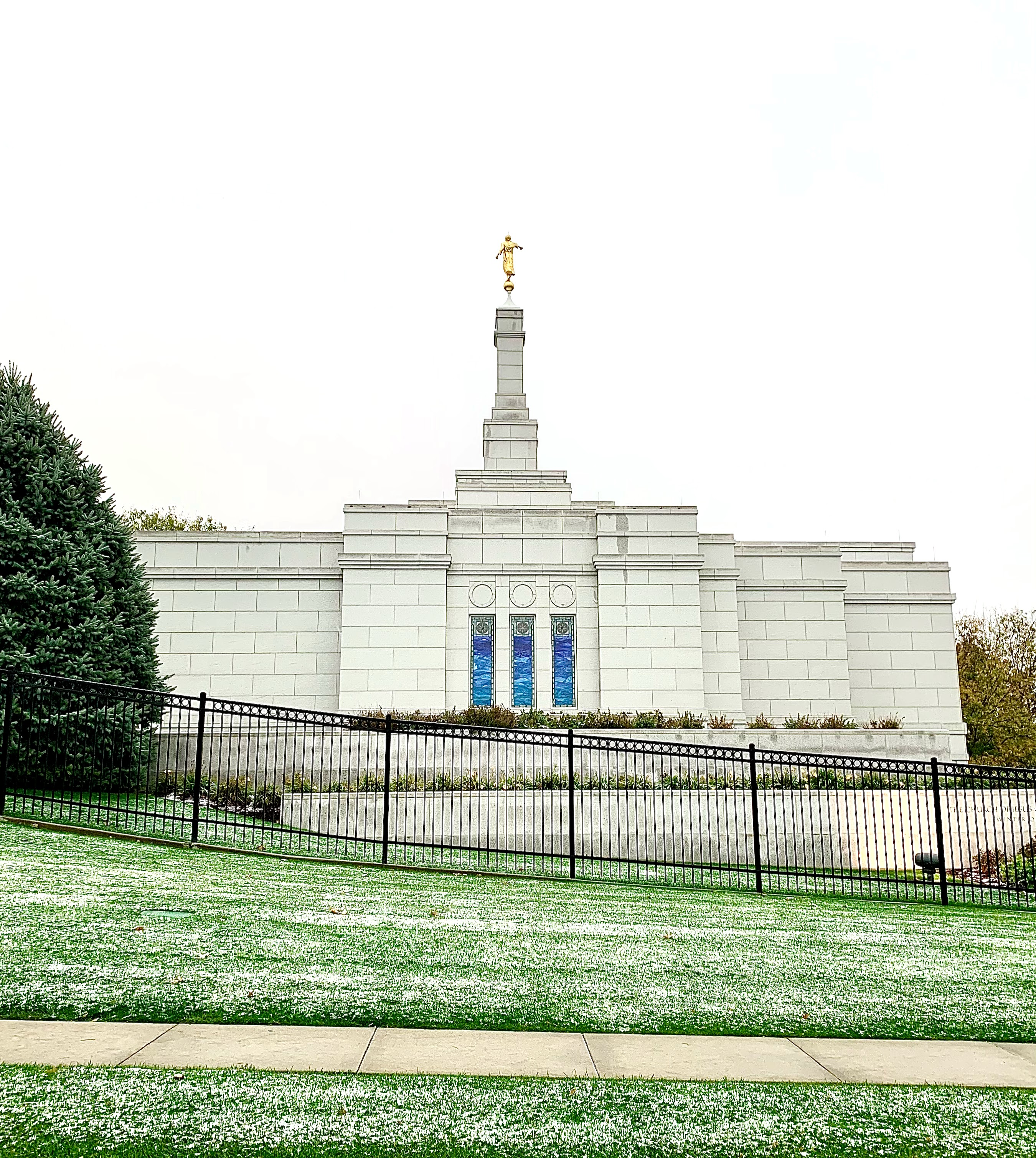
Winter Quarters Nebraska Temple

The temple was built next to the Mormon Pioneer Cemetery and Mormon Trail Center. During the groundbreaking ceremony on November 28, 1999, Truman Clawson, director of the local visitors' center, said, "Now today on this end of the hill, we will take shovels in our hands to dig not a grave but the foundation of a special building, a temple."

In preparation for the open house, church members and the community of Florence worked together creating handcrafted flowers for storefronts and decorating historic sites and markers with balloons. Over 61,000 visitors toured the temple during the open house, which was held from March 30 to April 14, 2001.

Members all over the United States and Canada watched via satellite broadcast as LDS Church president Gordon B. Hinckley dedicated the Winter Quarters Nebraska Temple on April 22, 2001. During the dedicatory prayer, Hinckley recognized the sacrifice of the Saints and the great spiritual and historical significance of having a temple at Winter Quarters.

At one time, the church intended to name the temple Winter Quarters Temple, rather than using the standard naming convention for church temples.

In 2020, like all the church's temples, the Winter Quarters Nebraska Temple was closed for a time due to the COVID-19 pandemic.

== Design and architecture ==
The building has a traditional architectural style. Designed by Dan Reinhardt of Reinhardt & Associates, its architecture reflects the history and significance of the early Mormon pioneers. The temple is on a 1.92-acre plot, with surrounding landscaping of trees, shrubbery, and grass fields.

The structure is 86 feet tall, and constructed with Bethel white granite. The exterior has stained-glass windows. There are six panels below its angel Moroni statue and described in the church’s magazine Ensign: “The top three panels depict the heavens…Each panel contains a mariner’s compass. In the center of each compass are stars and the moon, representing the telestial and terrestrial kingdoms. The glowing rays of the sun make up the outer ring of each compass, representing the celestial kingdom. The bottom three panels depict a river, rolling hills, and wildflowers.”

The temple’s total floor area is 10,700 square feet. The interior “evokes a pioneer ambiance.” The furniture was made in 1850s style, with windows and carpets having a floral motif which reflects the state flowers of those the pioneers traveled through: Illinois, Iowa, Nebraska, Wyoming, and Utah. Like the exterior, the interior has stained-glass windows designed by Tom Holdman. The temple’s 18 windows “tell the story of the epic gathering of Zion by way of Winter Quarters.”

The temple has two ordinance rooms, two sealing rooms, and a baptistry, each designed for ceremonial use.

The design uses elements representing Latter-day Saint history and Biblical symbolism, to provide deeper spiritual meaning to the temple's appearance and function. Symbolism is important to church members and are largely found in the temple’s stained-glass windows. For example, those in the baptistry feature quilt like patterns “to represent the pioneers who had to wrap the bodies of their loved ones in quilts before they buried them.” The baptistry’s windows also depict a river, in reference to the river of life in Revelation 22:1-2; the river was formed with pulverized crystal, which is both a reference to the scriptural passage and an homage to “the early Church members who crushed their china and silver to mix with mortar in the walls of the Kirtland Temple to make it shimmer.” The temple is both a place of worship and an architectural landmark in Omaha, Nebraska.

== Temple presidents ==
The church's temples are directed by a temple president and matron, each serving for a term of three years. The president and matron oversee the administration of temple operations and provide guidance and training for both temple patrons and staff.

Serving from 2001 to 2004, Evan L. Butler was the president, with Doris J. Butler as matron. Notable presidents of the temple include Theodore H. Okiishi (2013-2016) and Donald D. Deshler (2016-2019). As of 2024, David G. Pincock is the president, with FaDene B. Pincock serving as matron.

== Admittance ==
Following completion of the temple, the church held a public open house from March 30 to April 14, 2001 (excluding Sundays). During the open house, 61,038 people visited the temple. The temple was dedicated by Gordon B. Hinckley on April 22, 2001, in four sessions.

Like all the church's temples, it is not used for Sunday worship services. To members of the church, temples are regarded as sacred houses of the Lord. Once dedicated, only church members with a current temple recommend can enter for worship.

== See also ==
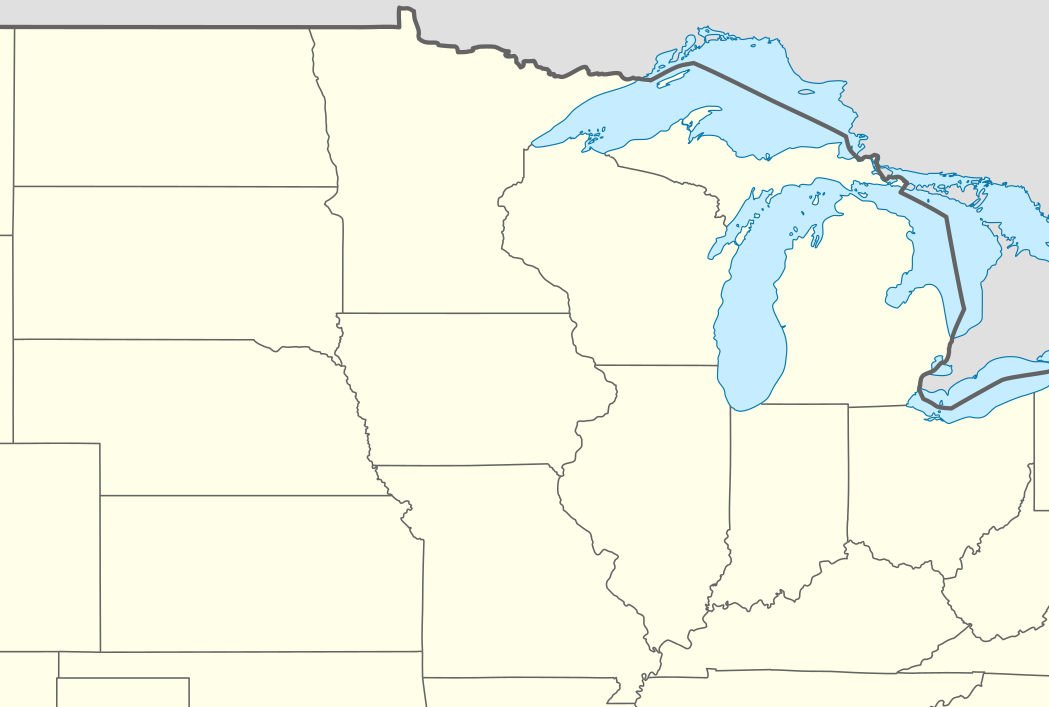
Temples in the United States Midwest
- = Operating
- = Under construction
- = Announced
- = Temporarily Closed
- Theodore H. Okiishi, temple president (2013–2016)
- Comparison of temples of The Church of Jesus Christ of Latter-day Saints
- List of temples of The Church of Jesus Christ of Latter-day Saints
- List of temples of The Church of Jesus Christ of Latter-day Saints by geographic region
- Temple architecture
- List of churches in Omaha, Nebraska
- The Church of Jesus Christ of Latter-day Saints in Nebraska
