= Florence School =

Coordinates: 41°19′51″N 95°58′09″W

Florence Elementary School
- 7902 North 36th Street; Omaha, Nebraska 68112; United States

Information
- Type: Public elementary school
- School district: Omaha Public Schools
- Principal: Mrs. Black (2008-12); Dan Hoeck (2013-2019); Jodie Lenser (2019-Present)
- Grades: K-5
- Color: Red
- Mascot: Fox
- Website: Florence School

The Florence School is located at 7902 North 36th Street in the Florence neighborhood of north Omaha, Nebraska, United States. The first school in the Florence area was built in the 1840s, in what was then called Cutler's Park by Mormon pioneers. The present-day Florence Elementary School was started in the late 1850s after the town of Florence was founded.

== About ==
As early as 1868 the Florence School was used as a polling place in Nebraska state elections.

A new building was erected in 1889 at the base of the bluff overlooking the Missouri River.

In the 1890s, Julia Krisl became one of the first Czech principals in the city of Omaha while at the Florence School. The Florence School building was replaced in 1964.

Florence B. Reynolds, a principal at the school in the 1920s, was a published scholar who examined labor relations with teachers.
