= Mormon Trail Center at Winter Quarters =

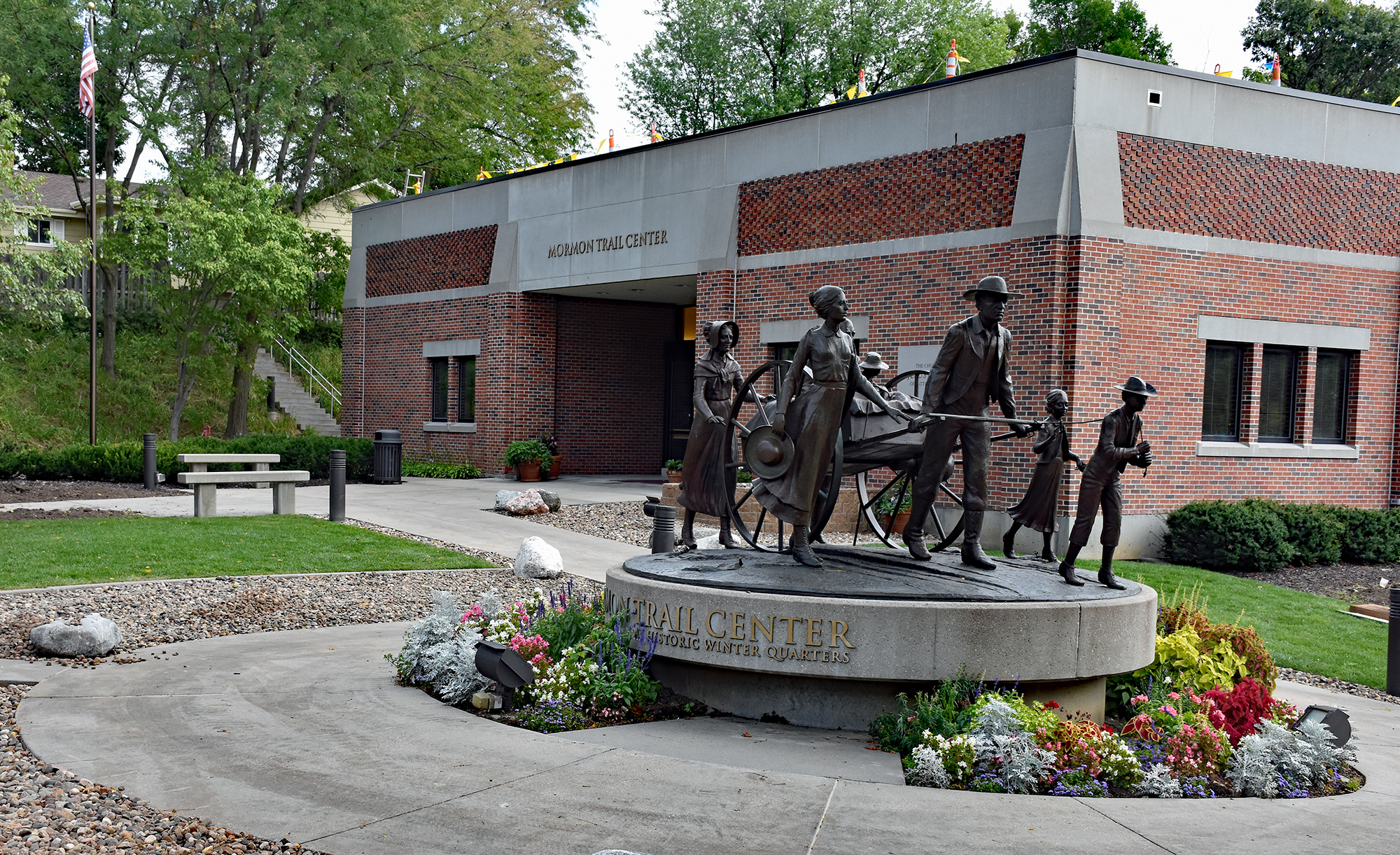
- Front entrance to the museum

- Location within Nebraska
- Established: 1997
- Location: Florence neighborhood of Omaha, Nebraska, United States
- Coordinates: 41°20′6.88″N 95°57′54.34″W
- Owner: The Church of Jesus Christ of Latter-day Saints
- Website: Mormon Trail Center

The Mormon Trail Center at Winter Quarters is a museum and visitors' center of the Church of Jesus Christ of Latter-day Saints located in the Florence neighborhood of Omaha, Nebraska, United States. The museum interprets the story of the Mormon Trail along with the history of a temporary Mormon settlement known as Winter Quarters, which was located in the Florence area between 1846 and 1848.

The museum is located on a bluff above and to the west of the Winter Quarters settlement site and is directly across the street from the historic Mormon Pioneer Cemetery and the Winter Quarters Nebraska Temple.

== History ==
=== Early Visitors' Center ===
Prior to the construction of the current center, a small remodeled house had served as a visitors' center for tourists coming to see Florence and the Mormon Pioneer Cemetery. This center was closed on August 1, 1995, in preparation for the construction of the new museum, and trailers served as a temporary center for visitors during the building process.

=== Current Museum ===
The new museum, constructed of red brick, has 11,000 square feet of display space and a large lower level. It opened at the end of 1996 with a preview of partially completed exhibits and that year's gingerbread house display.

The museum was dedicated by Church President Gordon B. Hinckley on April 18, 1997. The dedication was part of that year's sesquicentennial celebration of Brigham Young's Vanguard Company leaving Winter Quarters, trekking across the United States, and arriving in Mexico's Salt Lake Valley in 1847.

In 1998 a life-sized statue of a Mormon handcart family was placed on a round, concrete pedestal in front of the museum. The statue was created by Latter-day Saint sculptor Franz M. Johansen. During a landscaping project in 2024, the statue was removed from the pedestal and moved slightly, where it is now displayed at ground level.

== Exhibits ==
=== Zion in the Wilderness ===
The current museum opened with an exhibit titled "Zion in the Wilderness - from Temple City to Temple City." The exhibit contains three phases, the first, titled "An American Exodus," interprets the Mormon Exodus from Navuoo, Illinois, along with the story of the Mormon Trail (and its many refugee camps) across Iowa. The second phase, titled "At the Bluff," tells the history of Winter Quarters and surrounding settlements, and the final phase "Gathering to Zion" shares the story of the Mormon Trail from Winter Quarters to the Salt Lake Valley.

== Former Exhibits ==
=== Christmas Gingerbread Houses ===
In 1985, an annual Christmas gingerbread house display was established in the old visitors' center. The annual event continued following the construction of the new museum and became a popular local tradition, with nearly 300 gingerbread houses on display during the 2018 Christmas season (additional gingerbread houses were put on display at the nearby Kanesville Tabernacle). The gingerbread festival has since been discontinued.

== See also ==
- Kanesville Tabernacle
- Mormon Pioneer Cemetery
- National Historic Trails Interpretive Center
