= Florence Water Works =

Coordinates: 41°20′32″N 95°57′31″W

- Interactive map of the Florence Water Works area
- Alternative names: Minne Lusa Pumping Station

General information
- Type: Industrial
- Location: Florence, Omaha, Nebraska
- Completed: 1888
- Renovated: 1970
- Owner: Metropolitan Utilities District

Height
- Height: 6'0

Dimensions
- Diameter: 2

The Florence Water Works is located along John J. Pershing Drive in the Florence neighborhood of Omaha, Nebraska. Home of the Minne Lusa Pumping Station, the Water Works has provided water throughout the city of Omaha since 1880.

== History ==
The Florence Water Works was constructed in 1879 and finished in 1880 by the City Water Works Company, a private venture owned locally. That company defaulted on its loans, and in 1887, it was purchased by the American Water Works Company. American operated private water companies in many cities, including South Omaha and Denver. American started construction on the Minne Lusa Pumping Station that year, and it was opened by Mayor James Dahlman on August 1, 1889. A private owner took control of the local operations in late 1895, reopening the business as the Omaha Water Works. American provided ice produced from Missouri River water and distributed throughout the region.

The Metropolitan Utilities District (MUD) was founded in 1913, and was intended to consolidate the city's utility services under public control. However, MUD faced severe opposition from American, which refused to sell their interest. The city persisted their case, eventually taking the case to the United States federal courts. After a federal ruling in their favor in 1916, MUD acquired the works. It continued to produce ice for several years. In 1917, the City of Florence reported to the Nebraska State Legislature that it was unable to pay its bonds due to the loss of tax receipts from the privately owned American Water Works. This effectively bankrupted the town, and it was annexed by the City of Omaha the following year.

== Description ==
Operated by the Metropolitan Utilities District, the Water Works operates the intakes and pumps that draw water from the Missouri River for the city. It is the site of a chlorination plant, sedimentation and storage basins, and a filter plant that has a daily capacity of 72 million gallons. An intake station sits on the opposite side of J.J. Pershing Drive at the edge of the Missouri. The entire site is screened by trees.

== See also ==
- History of Omaha, Nebraska
- Walnut Hill Pumping Station
