= Wyoming, Nebraska =

Unincorporated community in Nebraska, U.S.

Coordinates: 40°44′08″N 95°55′10″W

Wyoming is an unincorporated community in Otoe County, Nebraska, United States.

== History ==
A post office was established at Wyoming in 1856, and remained in operation until it was discontinued in 1928. The community was named after Wyoming, Pennsylvania, the hometown of an early settler.

Wyoming was located on the Chicago, Burlington and Quincy Railroad.
