= Mormon Pioneer Cemetery =

Historic cemetery in Omaha, Douglas County, Nebraska

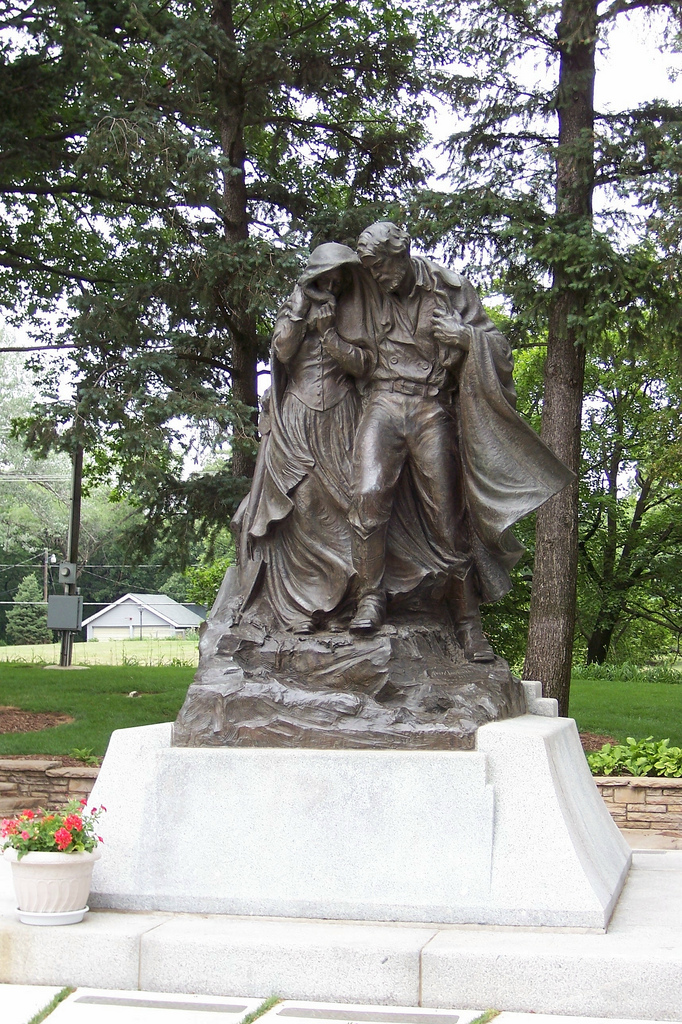
- The monument erected within the cemetery in 1936

- Location within Nebraska Location within the United States
- 41°20′05″N 95°57′58″W
- Location: Omaha, Nebraska

History
- Built: 1846

Omaha Landmark
- Designated: October 30, 1990

The Mormon Pioneer Cemetery is located at 3301 State Street in the present-day Florence neighborhood at the north end of Omaha, Nebraska. The Cemetery is the burial site of hundreds of Mormon pioneers who lived in Winter Quarters, a temporary settlement that lasted from 1846 to 1848 as the settlers moved to Salt Lake City, Utah. It was designated a landmark by the City of Omaha in 1990.

== History ==
Many of the Mormon pioneers heading west died during their temporary encampment at Winter Quarters between 1846 and 1848. Records of the Church of Jesus Christ of Latter-day Saints (LDS Church) indicate that 359 Mormon pioneers were buried at the site. Remnants of three of the graves are visible today, uncovered during the erection of a commemorative monument in 1936. The monument, a bronze statue by Salt Lake City artist Avard Fairbanks, depicts parents who have committed the body of an infant to the grave. The graves of a number of Florence residents are also in the cemetery, which the local community began to use several years after the Mormons left. The area had been used by Native American burial mounds prior to the pioneers.

In 1935, the city of Omaha began leasing the cemetery to the LDS Church, with the agreement that the church would landscape and maintain the property. Initially, some community members were opposed to the lease, worried that the history of the Mormon-period usage of the cemetery would overshadow that of the usage by Florence's settlers. Just prior to leasing the property to the church, the city had restricted new burials only to those who had a spouse already buried in the cemetery. With permission from LDS Church leaders, the final burial in the cemetery took place during 1953, when a woman was buried next to her husband (he having been interred there in 1913).

In 1999, after leasing the property for over 60 years, the church purchased the cemetery from the city for $1. Soon after the purchase, the church announced construction of a temple on land just south of the Mormon Pioneer-era section of the cemetery. As part of the construction, at least five graves were relocated to other areas of the cemetery to make way for the temple.

== Location and features ==
The cemetery is adjacent to the Winter Quarters Nebraska Temple, near the Mormon Trail Center at Winter Quarters. Two figures stand at the cemetery entrance: one represents sorrow, while the other represents hope. The names of the dead who are buried here and at Cutler's Park Cemetery are recorded on a Roll of Honor.

== See also ==
- Cutler's Park
- History of North Omaha, Nebraska
- List of cemeteries in Omaha
