= Theodore H. Okiishi =

American mechanical engineer (born 1939)

Theodore H. Okiishi (born 1939) is an American mechanical engineer. He is an emeritus faculty member at Iowa State University (ISU), where he also received his bachelors and doctoral degrees. He has written numerous technical papers, and is a co-author of the books A Brief Introduction to Fluid Mechanics and Fundamentals of Fluid Mechanics. The latter has been called one of the "top 10 standard handbooks for mechanical engineers."

== Education and career ==
Okiishi was born in Honolulu, Hawaii and graduated from Roosevelt High School in that city. From 1965 to 1967, Okiishi was in the United States military, where he worked with NASA and also did research on river flows in South Vietnam. He joined the ISU faculty in 1967. Okiishi would be associate dean of engineering at ISU for a time He served as Mechanical Engineering Department chair from 1990 to 1995. He also served as interim vice president of research and development at ISU. He was editor of the Journal of Turbomachinery from 1993 to 2003.

== Recognition ==
Okiishi was appointed a Fellow of the American Society of Mechanical Engineers in 1992. He received the Society's R. Tom Sawyer Award in 2008, for his contributions to Gas turbine technology. He also received the Society's Melville Medal in 1989 and 1998, for his publications in the Society's Transactions.

== Personal life and religious service ==
Okiishi is married to the former Rae Wiemers. He is a member of the Church of Jesus Christ of Latter-day Saints (LDS Church). Among other positions in the LDS Church, Okiishi has served as a bishop, counselor in a stake presidency, and as a stake patriarch. He and his wife served as temple president and matron of the Winter Quarters Nebraska Temple from 2013 to 2016. Okiishi also served for a time as president of the LDS Church's Jerusalem Branch, and with his wife oversaw the operations of LDS Humanitarian Services in Palestine and Israel.
