= Old People's Home (Omaha) =

- U.S. National Register of Historic Places
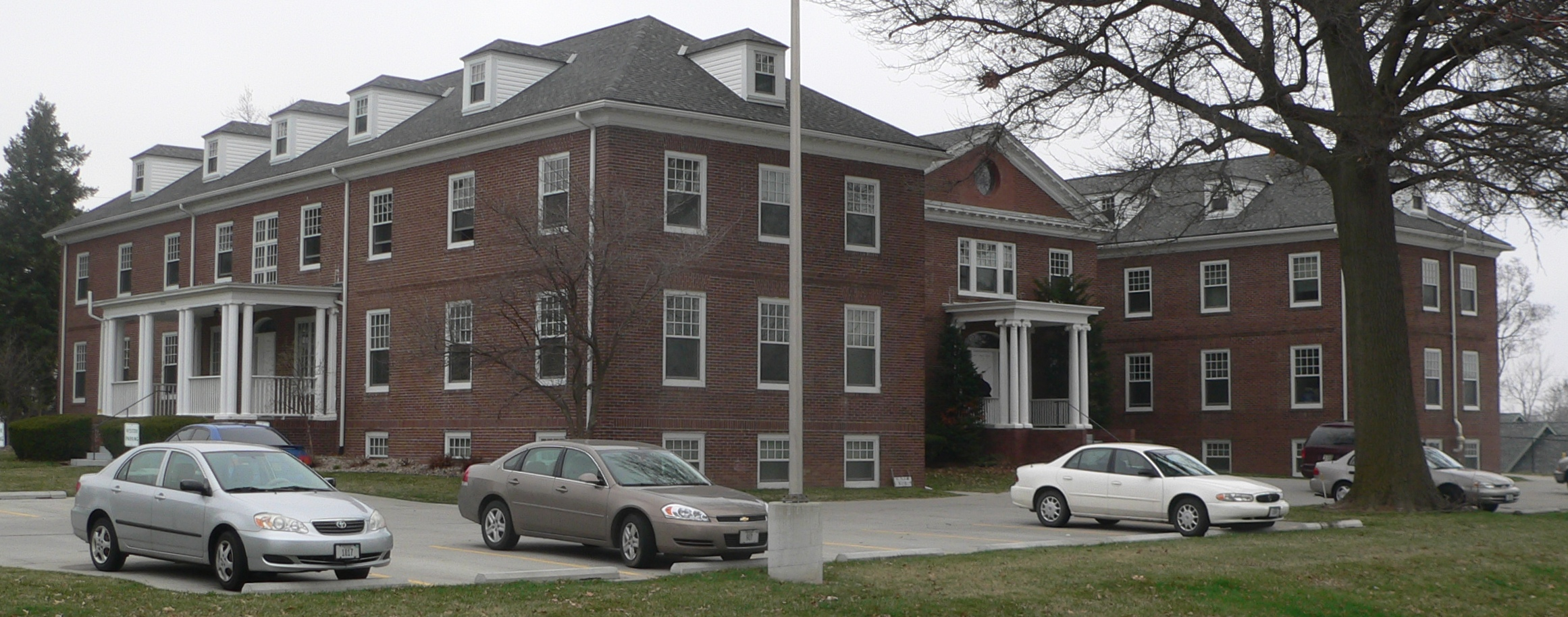
- Leo Vaughn Senior Manor in 2012

- Location within Nebraska Location within the United States
- Location: Omaha, NE
- Coordinates: 41°17′24.79″N 95°58′56.5″W
- Area: 2.3 acres (0.93 ha)
- Built: 1917
- Architect: John and Alan McDonald
- Architectural style: Colonial Revival
- NRHP reference No.: 87001182
- Added to NRHP: October 21, 1987

The Old People's Home, presently known as Leo Vaughan Senior Manor, is located at 3325 Fontenelle Boulevard in the Florence neighborhood on the north side of Omaha, Nebraska. Built in 1917, it was listed on the National Register of Historic Places in 1987.

== History ==
The Old People's Home was initiated by the Women's Christian Aid Association, one of Omaha's first private charitable organizations. Founded in 1883, the women's group raised funds to construct the two-story brick building in 1917. The building was converted from a nonprofit home to a residential retirement center in 1988.
