= Florence Firehouse =

Firehouse building in Nebraska, United States

Coordinates: 41°20′13″N 95°57′32″W

The Florence Firehouse is located at 8415 North 29th Street in the Florence neighborhood in the north end of Omaha, Nebraska. Built in 1888, it housed Florence Hose Company #1.

== History ==
The original Florence Fire Station was a "temporary" wood structure built in 1854 by the Florence city council. Located at the intersection of State and 4th Street, now called 29th Street, the Firehouse was simply a large garage that could accommodate two horses and the fire rig.

The city built a new structure of brick in 1888, and the volunteer firemen were called Fire Hose Company #1. When the City of Omaha annexed Florence in 1917, they immediately abandoned the station. In 1998 it was purchased by the Florence Historical Society.

== See also ==
- History of Omaha, Nebraska
