= Bank of Florence Museum =

- Bank of Florence
- U.S. National Register of Historic Places
- Omaha Landmark
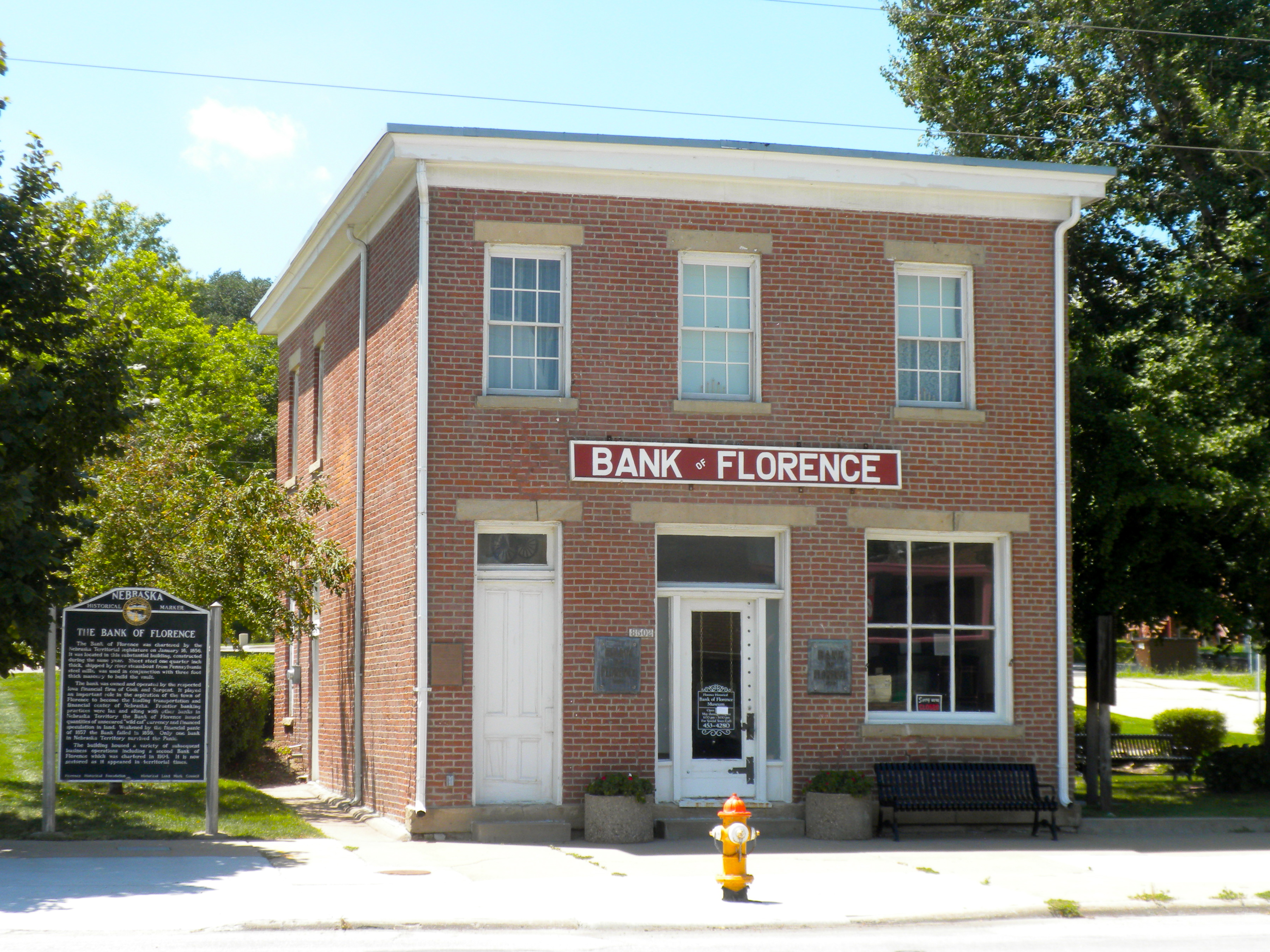

- Location within Nebraska Location within the United States
- Location: 8502 North 30th Street, Omaha, Nebraska
- Coordinates: 41.33730489220563°N 95.96095223899079°W
- Built: 1856
- Architectural style: Greek Revival
- NRHP reference No.: 69000130

Significant dates
- Added to NRHP: October 15, 1969
- Designated OMAL: October 14, 1980

The Bank of Florence was a wildcat bank located in Florence, Nebraska Territory. It originally operated for three years in the 1850s, and another bank adopted the name and location in 1904. Today the building that housed the bank is the Bank of Florence Museum. It is listed on the National Register of Historic Places, and is the oldest building in Omaha, Nebraska.

== History ==
The town of Florence was founded on the ruins of Winter Quarters, with dozens of small buildings still intact from the early Mormon pioneer settlement. A speculator's dream, the town was quickly built.

The Bank of Florence was built as a wildcat bank for speculators to make an easy profit. Many of the early investors included members of the land company that founded the nearby town of Saratoga, as well as businessmen from around the local area. When the Panic of 1857 hit, many local townspeople and farmers were financially drained.

The building reopened as the Second Bank of Florence in 1904, and was restored as a landmark in the 1980s.

Today the building has been turned into a museum, which is owned and operated by the Florence Historical Foundation. Visitors can view the main bank floor, the vault, the rooms upstairs that served as the home of the original bank manager, and a restored Florence Telephone Company switchboard. The bank is open on Saturdays and Sundays 11 AM-3 PM from May through August and on special event days. Tours on other days can be arranged by appointment.

== See also ==
- List of the oldest buildings in Nebraska
