= Florence Mill (Omaha, Nebraska) =

- Weber Mill
- U.S. National Register of Historic Places
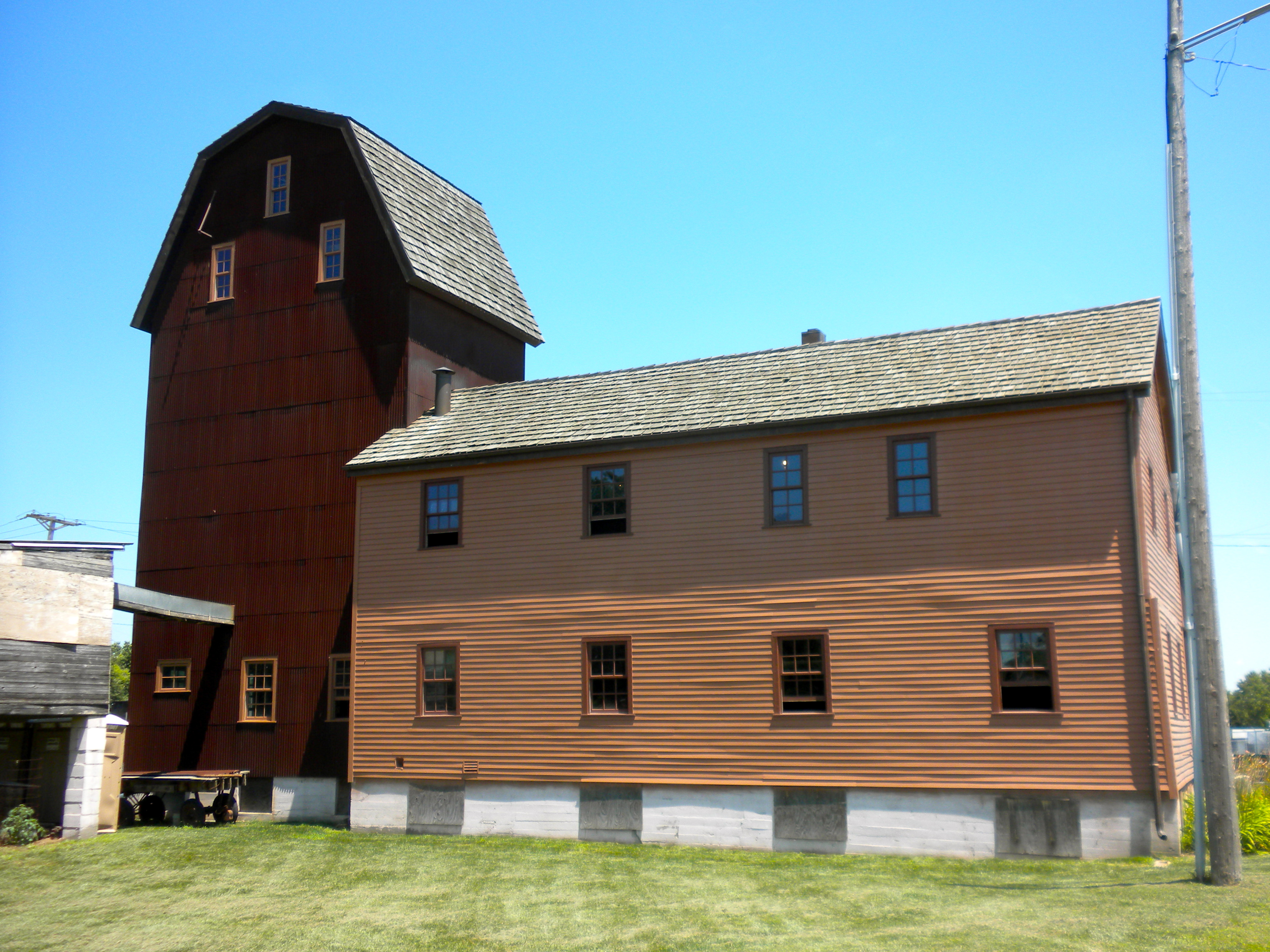

- Location within Nebraska Location within the United States
- Location: Omaha, Nebraska
- Coordinates: 41°20′37.34″N 95°57′41.01″W
- Built: 1847
- NRHP reference No.: 98001568
- Added to NRHP: December 31, 1998

Florence Mill, also known as the Weber Mill, is a historic mill located at 9102 North 30th Street near the 30th Street exit on I-680 in the Florence community in North Omaha, Nebraska. It was built in 1846 and operated into the 1960s. It was listed on the National Register of Historic Places as Weber Mill in 1998. The mill is also known as the Mormon Mill, Grist Mill, and Old Pink Mill. It is now operated as the Winter Quarters Mill Museum and ArtLoft Gallery.

== History ==
Brigham Young supervised construction by the Mormon pioneers of Winter Quarters in 1846. The Florence Mill is the only surviving building to have been built by the Mormons. The settlers needed a mill to grind corn, wheat, and rye to create cornmeal and flour products. Constructed next to Turkey Creek, later called Mill Creek, which flowed into the Missouri River, the original structure was deserted in 1846. A new mill was built in 1847 at the cost of $3000. Brigham Young sold this mill to John Neff, who deserted it when he moved to Salt Lake City.

Alexander Hunter began operating the Mill in 1856, helping to fill the demands of the new town of Florence, founded in 1854 on the old site of Winter Quarters. He tore down the original mill, reusing some of the good timbers to build a new mill.

== Weber family ==
Jacob Weber acquired the Mill around 1860, replacing water-powered machinery with new steam-powered equipment. The Weber family operated the Florence Mill continuously for over 104 years, contributing to the development of the milling industry between the last half of the nineteenth century into the twentieth century. The Weber's business was long considered to be the longest operating business in Nebraska.

== Winter Quarters Mill Museum and ArtLoft Gallery ==
The mill is now operated as the Winter Quarters Mill Museum and ArtLoft Gallery. The museum features pioneer-era historic photos, 1854 newspaper clippings and agricultural artifacts. The mill also hosts a farmers market from June through the end of September.

Contrary to previously published reports, Omaha billionaire Warren Buffett has not been actively involved in a drive to renovate the structure.

== See also ==
- History of North Omaha
