= Florence, Nebraska =

Neighborhood in Omaha, Nebraska, U.S.

Coordinates: 41°20′N 95°57′W

Florence Winter Quarters (1846—1848)
- Former city
- Interactive map of Florence
- Country: United States
- State: Nebraska
- City: Omaha
- Founded: October 3, 1854
- Incorporated: March 10, 1855
  - City: March 10, 1857
- Annexation: June 1, 1917

Government
  - Administrative body: Omaha City Council
- Elevation: 1,089 ft (332 m)

Florence was a historic municipality in Nebraska. Founded in 1854, the Nebraska Territory Legislature first incorporated it as a town in 1855 and then incorporated it as a city in 1857. In 1917, it was annexed by the City of Omaha and ceased to exist as an independent municipality. Since then it has been a neighborhood located in North Omaha.

== City of Florence ==
In the spring of 1854 James C. Mitchell, following the advice of the fur trader Peter A. Sarpy, platted a town named after his adopted daughter Florence, including the old buildings and improvements of an older settlement there.

Nearly a decade before in 1846, the Church of Jesus Christ of Latter-day Saints established Cutler's Park as a hold-over on their way from Nauvoo, Illinois to Utah. When that settlement was found to be wrongly located by a nearby United States Indian agent, it was relocated to a new site called Winter Quarters. For two years, more than 2,500 people lived in the village, which consisted of well-defined streets with hundreds of housing lots covered with cabins, tents, wagons and sod houses. Winter Quarters had a mayor and city council, 24 policemen and fireguards, various administrative committees, and a town square for public meetings. Today, the dead are buried in the Mormon Pioneer Cemetery from the community, which was the first town established in the Nebraska Territory. The Mormon pioneers left their town once they moved on in 1848. Mitchell platted Florence six years later. The town of Florence was named for one Miss Florence Kilbourn.

The new town of Florence was built from the detritus of old Winter Quarters, and with support from eastern land speculators it grew quickly outfitting more Mormon migrants through 1866, as well as others traveling west on the Great Platte River Road. James Mitchell's investment firm was called the Florence Land Company, and with funding from the Bank of Florence and other sources early settlers bought into the community.

In addition to being a bustling outfitting center, it quickly became the shopping hub for farmers in northern Douglas County. Late in 1854, the town of Florence made a bid to become the Nebraska State Capitol, which it lost to Omaha. The Bank of Florence, which took a hit in the Panic of 1857, continued serving the area for several years afterward.

It may not be generally known that, about seven miles north of Omaha, on the Missouri River, there is a small hamlet, yelped Florence, the proprietors of which have been, for months, laboring assiduously to delude strangers that it was a city.

Growing rapidly, the Nebraska Territorial Legislature incorporated Florence as an official city on March 10, 1857. Operating with a mayor and six-person city council, the City of Florence had several positions including a chief of police and other roles. With taxation authority came responsibilities such as a city hall, city park, more than 100 miles of streets throughout the community, sidewalks, and other municipal duties the city was obligated to upkeep.

=== Florence Legislature ===
In January, 1858 a group of representatives illegally moved the Nebraska Territorial Legislature to Florence following a violent outburst at the territorial capitol in Omaha. After repeatedly being dogged out of voting on the removal of the capitol from Omaha, a skirmish pitted representatives from Nebraska City, Florence, and other communities to convene outside of Omaha. Despite having a majority of members present for the vote to remove the capitol and all agreeing, the "Florence Legislature" did not succeed in swaying the Nebraska Territory governor, and the capitol remained in Omaha until 1867 when Nebraska gained statehood.

Between the 1850s and 1910s, Florence experienced a number of economic booms and downturns. In the 1860s, the town was a popular stopover for travelers heading west toward the Great Platte River Road. There were numerous hotels, banks, restaurants, taverns, blacksmiths, stores, drug stores and other sundries for Western travelers. These businesses boomed and busted with different financial panics, gold rushes, and government legislation making western migration in the United States more or less attractive. By the 1910s though, the City of Florence was floundering and leaders had to take drastic measures.

== Omaha annexation ==
After a ten-year campaign lablelled "Greater Omaha," on June 1, 1917, the City of Florence was annexed by the City of Omaha. The City government became unable to pay its bond obligations because of the loss of tax revenue when the Florence Water Works was made a public utility by the Metropolitan Utilities District.

The mayor of Florence, F.S. Tucker, signed over the City's authority, turned in the City seal, and officially relinquished his role. Omaha mayor James C. Dahlman oversaw the transition, and the Omaha City Council renamed a street in Florence in honor of Tucker for his role.

Today, while there are many historic landmarks throughout the present-day Florence neighborhood, there is no indication that the City of Florence ever existed.

== Standing landmarks ==
Some of the facilities developed during the existence of the Florence municipality include the 1856 Bank of Florence, located at 8502 North 30th Street. The Potter's Field Cemetery at 7909 Mormon Bridge Road is one of the oldest public cemeteries in the state of Nebraska. The Florence Depot was built in 1887 at North 28th and Grebe Street, and in a move to preserve it, the building was moved to 9000 North 30th Street in 1967 and converted into a history museum. A year later in 1888, the Florence Firehouse was built at 8415 North 29th Street. In 1892, the Florence Boulevard was developed from Ames Avenue north to Read Street to lead traffic on calm country rides to the city. The Fontenelle Boulevard was built from Military Road to North 30th Street by the turn of the 20th century. The Keirle House was built by a local businessman in 1905 at 3017 Mormon Street, and stands today as a testament to the city's one-time economic prowess. The 1917 Old People's Home at 3325 Fontenelle Boulevard was built to serve the community's seniors, and in 1924, the Notre Dame Academy and Convent opened at 3501 State Street for the local Catholic community.

Older landmarks that pre-date the City still standing include the site of the 1812 Fort Lisa, the site of the Encantonment Missouri and Fort Atkinson from 1819, the site of the 1822 Cabanne's Trading Post, the 1846 Florence Mill, the Mormon Pioneer Cemetery

=== Former landmarks ===
One of the former landmarks in the City of Florence was called the Mitchell House, and it was located at 8315 North 31st Street. Built by James C. Mitchell, some historic accounts asserted that Brigham Young lived in the house for a short period. The house was torn down in 1964 when it was determined termites had destroyed the majority of the building.

The Florence Firehouse was severely damaged in a fire that broke out due to faulty electrical wiring on May 15, 1984. It was rebuilt in the Urbana Gothic style, a transition from the early Fremol style of most other landmark Florence buildings.

In another example of restored historical beauty, the Florence Water Works was built in 1880 with a five-story tower on a large water pumping station. While that tower was demolished in the 1960s, in the 2010s the building was restored by the Metropolitan Utilities District with some of its historic appearance.

== See also ==
- History of North Omaha, Nebraska
- Timeline of North Omaha, Nebraska history
- Landmarks in North Omaha, Nebraska
