= Metropolitan Utilities District =

Public water and natural gas utility in Nebraska, USA

- Company type: Publicly owned
- Founded: 1913; 113 years ago
- Headquarters: 7350 World Communications Drive, Omaha, NE
- Area served: Omaha Metro
- Key people: Mark E. Doyle (President)
- Services: Water, Natural Gas
- Number of employees: 905 (2023)
- Website: www.mudomaha.com

The Metropolitan Utilities District, or M.U.D., is the political subdivision and public corporation of the U.S. State of Nebraska that operates the drinking water and natural gas systems for Omaha, Nebraska and surrounding areas. M.U.D. is the only metropolitan utilities district in the State of Nebraska, and the fifth largest public natural gas utility in the U.S.

== History ==
Founded by the Nebraska Legislature as the Metropolitan Water District in 1913, five years later, the state legislators authorized the City of Omaha to assign the responsibility for operation of the gas system to the Metropolitan Water District. The name was changed to the Metropolitan Utilities District in 1921.

== Operations ==
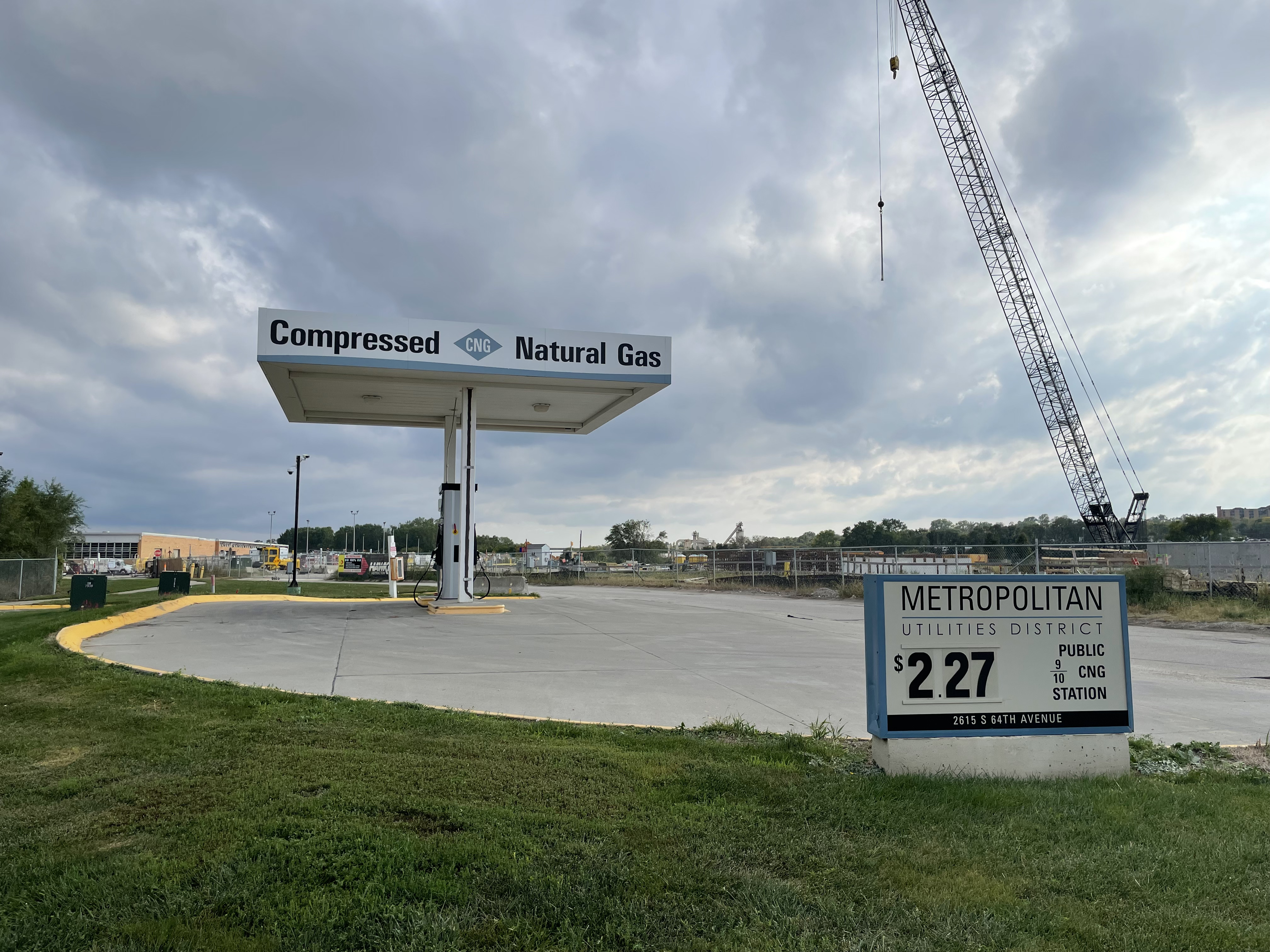

According to Nebraska State law, M.U.D. may enter contracts, promulgate regulations, set water and natural gas rates, buy, sell or lease land and issue revenue bonds. It can also levy a water tax of 1.5 mills or less for fire protection, and collect sewer fees and other utility charges for other governmental agencies in areas where it provides water at retail.

Currently, M.U.D. provides natural gas service to more than 241,000 customers and provides water service to more than 227,000 customers. M.U.D.'s governing body is a seven-member board of directors, publicly elected to six-year terms on a nonpartisan basis.

=== CNG Filling stations ===
M.U.D. operates a filling station for Compressed Natural Gas-powered vehicles near 64th & Center St in Omaha. The district also offers a $500 rebate to purchasers of CNG-powered vehicles.

== See also ==
- Omaha Public Power District
- Government of Omaha, Nebraska
- Florence Water Works
