= Winter Quarters (North Omaha, Nebraska) =

American historic place

Coordinates: 41.33808°N 95.96103°W

- Former LDS camp
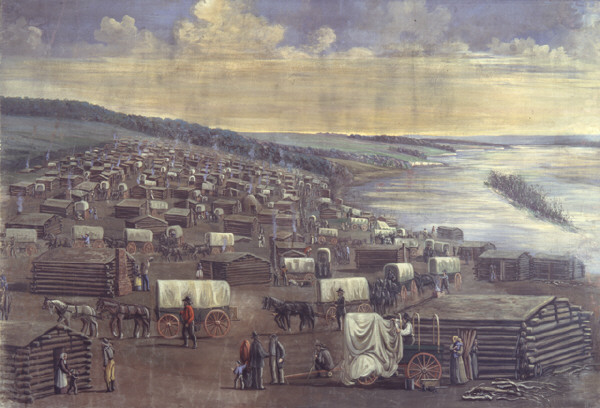
- Mormons at Winter Quarters

- Location within Nebraska
- Country: United States
- State: Nebraska
- Established: September 1846
- Vacated: December 1848

Population (September 1846)
  - Total: 3,800

Winter Quarters was an encampment formed by approximately 2,500 members of the Church of Jesus Christ of Latter-day Saints as they waited during the winter of 1846–47 for better conditions for their trek westward. It followed a preliminary tent settlement some 3½ miles west at Cutler's Park. Members of the Church built more than 800 cabins at the Winter Quarters settlement. Located in present-day North Omaha overlooking the Missouri River, the settlement remained populated until 1848.

== History ==
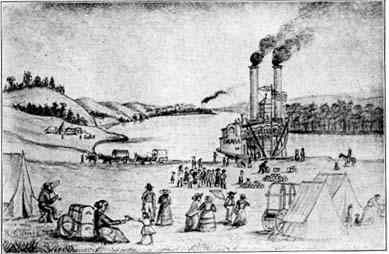
Winter Quarters landing in 1848.

Wintering Latter-day Saints had been driven from their homes in Nauvoo, Illinois by mobs. Forced to leave on relatively short notice, they were unable to bring many useful supplies. Influential non-member Thomas L. Kane, seeking to convince the Latter-day Saints' leaders to establish a volunteer military group (later known as the Mormon Battalion), received permission from the federal government for the group to encamp in Omaha Tribe lands, including the site of Cutler's Park. Conditions at the settlement remained primitive the first month, with pioneers living in tents while the men put up hay, found water and managed the cattle.

Due to arguments among the Oto and Omaha tribes over use of the land, the Latter-day Saints moved their camp three miles east to a site overlooking the Missouri River. There they built cabins and sod houses for the winter. One group of cabins became known as Kimball Row. It consisted of thirteen adjacent cabins, with the homes of church leaders Heber C. Kimball and Newel K. Whitney at either end. The Latter-day Saints actively traded with American Indian and trading settlements in northern Missouri and Iowa, exchanging household goods and small amounts of cash for foodstuffs, such as hogs, grain and vegetables, and supplies for the emigration effort. Young Latter-day Saint men also produced handcrafted items such as willow baskets and washboards for sale. Church funds also allowed the community to build a much needed water-powered gristmill.

Even with trade, diet in the camp was mainly corn bread, salt bacon and a little milk, with occasional fresh game or domestic meat. Scurvy, known as "blackleg" during this period, became a major problem. Missouri potatoes and horseradish found at old Fort Atkinson helped ease the level of disease, but all residents lacked fresh vegetables in their diet. Tuberculosis (known as consumption), malaria, and unidentified fevers and chills also plagued the temporary settlement. Church member Louisa Barnes Pratt recalled in her memoirs:

I hired a man to build me a sod cave. He took turf from the earth, laid it up, covered it with willow brush and sods. Built a chimney of the same ... I paid a five dollar gold piece for building my sod house, 10 × 12 ... A long cold rain storm brought more severely again the chills and fever. These with scurvy made me helpless indeed! ... Many of my friends sickened and died in that place, when I was not able to leave my room, could not go to their bedside to administer comfort to them in the last trying hours, not even to bid them farewell. Neither could I go to see their remains carried to their final resting place where it was thought I would shortly have to be conveyed.

Church records for the first summer do not contain information on disease victims; however, later records indicate that, from mid-September 1846 to May 1848, disease caused the deaths of 359 residents.

Brigham Young supervised construction of the Florence Mill. It is reportedly the only surviving building in the area to have been built by the Latter-day Saint camp. The settlers needed a mill to grind corn, wheat, and rye to create cornmeal and flour products. Constructed next to Turkey Creek, later called Mill Creek, which flowed into the Missouri River, the original structure was started in the fall of 1846. It was completed by the spring of 1847 at the cost of $3,000. Brigham Young sold this mill to John Neff, who left it when he also moved to Salt Lake City. Later settlers renovated and used the mill for years. Evidence of the original construction techniques has been found in the surviving Florence Mill.

The area that was once Winter Quarters became part of the community of Florence, which then became part of North Omaha. The pioneer community is remembered with several attractions, including the Mormon Pioneer Cemetery, Cutler's Park, Mormon Trail Center and the Mormon Pioneer Memorial Bridge. The Winter Quarters Nebraska Temple was dedicated there on Sunday, April 22nd, 2001.

== See also ==
- Cabanne's Trading Post
- Engineer Cantonment
- Fort Atkinson
- History of North Omaha, Nebraska
- Mormon Trail
- Winter Quarters Nebraska Temple
- Timeline of North Omaha, Nebraska history
