= 1948 United States presidential election in Nebraska =

- November 2, 1948

All 6 Nebraska votes to the Electoral College
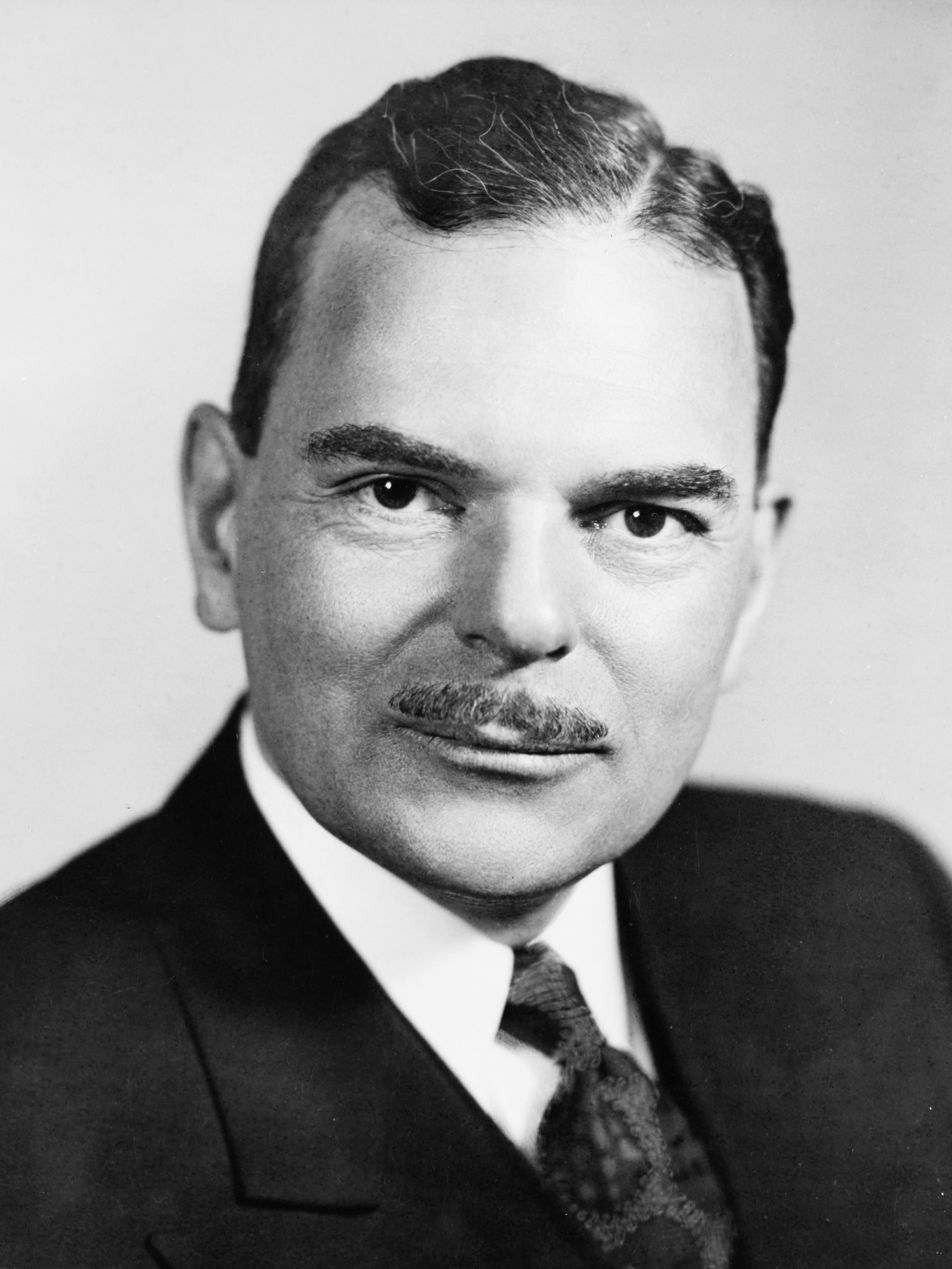

Nominee	Thomas E. Dewey	Harry S. Truman
Party	Republican	Democratic
Home state	New York	Missouri
Running mate	Earl Warren	Alben W. Barkley
Electoral vote	6	0
Popular vote	264,774	224,165
Percentage	54.15%	45.85%
County results
Dewey
50–60%
60–70%
70–80%
Truman
50–60%
60–70%
President before election
Harry S. Truman
Democratic
Elected President
Harry S. Truman
Democratic

The 1948 United States presidential election in Nebraska took place on November 2, 1948, as part of the 1948 United States presidential election. Voters chose six representatives, or electors, to the Electoral College, who voted for president and vice president.

Nebraska was won by Governor Thomas E. Dewey (R–New York), running with Governor Earl Warren, with 54.15% of the popular vote, against incumbent President Harry S. Truman (D–Missouri), running with Senator Alben W. Barkley, with 45.85% of the popular vote. As of the 2020 presidential election, this is the last occasion Wheeler County has voted for a Democratic presidential candidate.

Dewey won Nebraska by an 8.3% margin, a significantly reduced margin from his 1944 run, when he won by 17.2%.

Though he failed to win the state, Truman's performance in Nebraska was the best for a Democrat since Franklin Roosevelt's victory in 1936, and would remain the best until Lyndon B. Johnson's narrow victory in 1964. This was the only election between 1900 and 1992 in which Nebraska voted differently than neighboring Colorado.

With 54.15% of the popular vote, Nebraska would prove to be Dewey's third strongest state in the nation after Vermont and Maine.

== Results ==
1948 United States presidential election in Nebraska
Party	Candidate	Votes	%
Republican	Thomas E. Dewey	264,774	54.15%
Democratic	Harry S. Truman (inc.)	224,165	45.85%
Write-in		1 (Note: This write-in vote was not listed by county but as part of the state-wide total.)	0.00%
Total votes		488,940	100%

=== Results by county ===
County	Thomas Edmund Dewey Republican		Harry S. Truman Democratic		Margin		Total votes cast
County	#	%	#	%	#	%	Total votes cast
Adams	5,560	54.45%	4,652	45.55%	908	8.89%	10,212
Antelope	2,868	60.49%	1,873	39.51%	995	20.99%	4,741
Arthur	199	57.51%	147	42.49%	52	15.03%	346
Banner	309	57.43%	229	42.57%	80	14.87%	538
Blaine	252	50.40%	248	49.60%	4	0.80%	500
Boone	2,235	55.69%	1,778	44.31%	457	11.39%	4,013
Box Butte	2,351	53.75%	2,023	46.25%	328	7.50%	4,374
Boyd	1,060	50.60%	1,035	49.40%	25	1.19%	2,095
Brown	1,174	62.65%	700	37.35%	474	25.29%	1,874
Buffalo	4,862	56.68%	3,716	43.32%	1,146	13.36%	8,578
Burt	2,656	58.30%	1,900	41.70%	756	16.59%	4,556
Butler	2,105	44.69%	2,605	55.31%	-500	-10.62%	4,710
Cass	3,527	53.70%	3,041	46.30%	486	7.40%	6,568
Cedar	2,616	50.37%	2,578	49.63%	38	0.73%	5,194
Chase	1,094	59.78%	736	40.22%	358	19.56%	1,830
Cherry	2,141	58.93%	1,492	41.07%	649	17.86%	3,633
Cheyenne	2,161	50.26%	2,139	49.74%	22	0.51%	4,300
Clay	2,511	61.24%	1,589	38.76%	922	22.49%	4,100
Colfax	1,928	50.41%	1,897	49.59%	31	0.81%	3,825
Cuming	2,930	63.88%	1,657	36.12%	1,273	27.75%	4,587
Custer	4,057	54.73%	3,356	45.27%	701	9.46%	7,413
Dakota	1,379	36.76%	2,372	63.24%	-993	-26.47%	3,751
Dawes	2,399	61.54%	1,499	38.46%	900	23.09%	3,898
Dawson	4,203	61.75%	2,603	38.25%	1,600	23.51%	6,806
Deuel	1,043	71.68%	412	28.32%	631	43.37%	1,455
Dixon	1,899	52.44%	1,722	47.56%	177	4.89%	3,621
Dodge	5,848	54.56%	4,870	45.44%	978	9.12%	10,718
Douglas	47,175	48.92%	49,258	51.08%	-2,083	-2.16%	96,433
Dundy	935	59.14%	646	40.86%	289	18.28%	1,581
Fillmore	2,677	58.54%	1,896	41.46%	781	17.08%	4,573
Franklin	1,555	53.71%	1,340	46.29%	215	7.43%	2,895
Frontier	1,307	60.71%	846	39.29%	461	21.41%	2,153
Furnas	2,258	60.18%	1,494	39.82%	764	20.36%	3,752
Gage	5,311	56.29%	4,124	43.71%	1,187	12.58%	9,435
Garden	923	64.01%	519	35.99%	404	28.02%	1,442
Garfield	702	56.43%	542	43.57%	160	12.86%	1,244
Gosper	621	52.05%	572	47.95%	49	4.11%	1,193
Grant	273	66.26%	139	33.74%	134	32.52%	412
Greeley	829	39.59%	1,265	60.41%	-436	-20.82%	2,094
Hall	5,694	55.37%	4,590	44.63%	1,104	10.74%	10,284
Hamilton	2,406	61.46%	1,509	38.54%	897	22.91%	3,915
Harlan	1,490	54.98%	1,220	45.02%	270	9.96%	2,710
Hayes	529	55.86%	418	44.14%	111	11.72%	947
Hitchcock	1,208	56.69%	923	43.31%	285	13.37%	2,131
Holt	3,147	54.55%	2,622	45.45%	525	9.10%	5,769
Hooker	249	74.33%	86	25.67%	163	48.66%	335
Howard	1,133	37.44%	1,893	62.56%	-760	-25.12%	3,026
Jefferson	3,352	60.29%	2,208	39.71%	1,144	20.58%	5,560
Johnson	1,817	58.46%	1,291	41.54%	526	16.92%	3,108
Kearney	1,440	50.70%	1,400	49.30%	40	1.41%	2,840
Keith	1,600	59.06%	1,109	40.94%	491	18.12%	2,709
Keya Paha	538	57.54%	397	42.46%	141	15.08%	935
Kimball	1,024	60.38%	672	39.62%	352	20.75%	1,696
Knox	2,778	51.68%	2,597	48.32%	181	3.37%	5,375
Lancaster	23,620	56.29%	18,338	43.71%	5,282	12.59%	41,958
Lincoln	4,419	51.68%	4,131	48.32%	288	3.37%	8,550
Logan	254	52.16%	233	47.84%	21	4.31%	487
Loup	294	52.78%	263	47.22%	31	5.57%	557
Madison	5,486	62.41%	3,304	37.59%	2,182	24.82%	8,790
McPherson	209	68.08%	98	31.92%	111	36.16%	307
Merrick	2,074	62.08%	1,267	37.92%	807	24.15%	3,341
Morrill	1,478	52.82%	1,320	47.18%	158	5.65%	2,798
Nance	1,339	56.79%	1,019	43.21%	320	13.57%	2,358
Nemaha	2,413	58.85%	1,687	41.15%	726	17.71%	4,100
Nuckolls	2,036	52.71%	1,827	47.29%	209	5.41%	3,863
Otoe	4,060	61.75%	2,515	38.25%	1,545	23.50%	6,575
Pawnee	1,725	57.58%	1,271	42.42%	454	15.15%	2,996
Perkins	904	51.16%	863	48.84%	41	2.32%	1,767
Phelps	2,489	57.83%	1,815	42.17%	674	15.66%	4,304
Pierce	1,866	57.43%	1,383	42.57%	483	14.87%	3,249
Platte	3,812	53.47%	3,317	46.53%	495	6.94%	7,129
Polk	2,026	59.21%	1,396	40.79%	630	18.41%	3,422
Red Willow	2,610	53.84%	2,238	46.16%	372	7.67%	4,848
Richardson	3,778	51.77%	3,519	48.23%	259	3.55%	7,297
Rock	809	64.00%	455	36.00%	354	28.01%	1,264
Saline	2,641	42.33%	3,598	57.67%	-957	-15.34%	6,239
Sarpy	2,367	47.32%	2,635	52.68%	-268	-5.36%	5,002
Saunders	3,660	47.91%	3,979	52.09%	-319	-4.18%	7,639
Scotts Bluff	5,409	55.22%	4,386	44.78%	1,023	10.44%	9,795
Seward	2,916	56.18%	2,274	43.82%	642	12.37%	5,190
Sheridan	2,180	54.62%	1,811	45.38%	369	9.25%	3,991
Sherman	1,003	38.41%	1,608	61.59%	-605	-23.17%	2,611
Sioux	657	55.82%	520	44.18%	137	11.64%	1,177
Stanton	1,259	56.01%	989	43.99%	270	12.01%	2,248
Thayer	2,601	57.39%	1,931	42.61%	670	14.78%	4,532
Thomas	312	56.73%	238	43.27%	74	13.45%	550
Thurston	1,149	37.81%	1,890	62.19%	-741	-24.38%	3,039
Valley	1,670	54.66%	1,385	45.34%	285	9.33%	3,055
Washington	2,400	55.74%	1,906	44.26%	494	11.47%	4,306
Wayne	2,323	66.73%	1,158	33.27%	1,165	33.47%	3,481
Webster	1,964	59.00%	1,365	41.00%	599	17.99%	3,329
Wheeler	264	44.67%	327	55.33%	-63	-10.66%	591
York	3,960	65.44%	2,091	34.56%	1,869	30.89%	6,051
Totals	264,774	54.15%	224,165	45.85%	40,609	8.31%	488,940

==== Counties that flipped from Republican to Democratic ====
- Saunders
- Wheeler

== See also ==
- United States presidential elections in Nebraska
