= Duluth (disambiguation) =

Duluth, Minnesota is a city in the United States.

Duluth or DuLuth may also refer to:

- Duluth, Georgia, a suburb of Atlanta, in the United States
- Duluth, Kansas, an unincorporated community
- Duluth, Nebraska, an unincorporated community
- Duluth, Washington, a census-designated place
- Duluth (album), an album by Trampled by Turtles
- Duluth (novel), by Gore Vidal
- "Duluth", a song by Mason Jennings from his 2000 album Birds Flying Away
- USS Duluth (CL-87), light cruiser commissioned late in World War II
- USS Duluth (LPD-6), amphibious transport dock commissioned in 1966
- Daniel Greysolon, Sieur du Lhut, French explorer whose name is sometimes anglicized as DuLuth
- Duluth model, a program developed to reduce domestic violence

== See also ==
- Duluth University (disambiguation)
- Roman Catholic Diocese of Duluth
- Glacial Lake Duluth
- Duluth Complex, a geological formation in northeastern Minnesota
- Duluth, Missabe and Iron Range Railway
- Duluth, South Shore and Atlantic Railway
- Duluth, Winnipeg and Pacific Railway
