= 1944 United States presidential election in Nebraska =

- November 7, 1944

All 6 Nebraska votes to the Electoral College

Nominee	Thomas E. Dewey	Franklin D. Roosevelt
Party	Republican	Democratic
Home state	New York	New York
Running mate	John W. Bricker	Harry S. Truman
Electoral vote	6	0
Popular vote	329,880	233,246
Percentage	58.58%	41.42%
County results
Dewey
50–60%
60–70%
70–80%
Roosevelt
50–60%
President before election
Franklin D. Roosevelt
Democratic
Elected President
Franklin D. Roosevelt
Democratic

The 1944 United States presidential election in Nebraska took place on November 7, 1944, as part of the 1944 United States presidential election. Voters chose six representatives, or electors, to the Electoral College, who voted for president and vice president.

Nebraska was won by the Republican nominee, Governor of New York Thomas E. Dewey, running with Governor of Ohio John Bricker, with 58.58% of the popular vote, against incumbent Democratic President Franklin D. Roosevelt, running with Missouri Senator Harry S. Truman, with 41.42% of the popular vote.

Dewey won Nebraska by a large margin of 17.2%, a 2.8% increase from Wendell Willkie's margin 4 years earlier in 1940. Key to his victory were his large margins in the rural agriculture-reliant counties, which had supported Roosevelt in his previous runs in 1932 and 1936, however turned against him in 1940, largely due to parts of The New Deal which paid farmers to destroy their crops to prevent overproduction backfiring, and causing food shortages, along with requiring more food to be imported from other countries. With a swing to the right of 2.8%, Nebraska continued its heavy trend to the Republican column, with 1944 marking its 3rd consecutive swing to the right, which began in 1936 with Alf Landon's surprising overperformance. Roosevelt did however manage to flip Greeley County by 23 votes, which had voted for Willkie.

With a nationwide Roosevelt popular vote victory margin of 7.5%, Nebraska voted 24.7% to the right of the nation, and the state would prove to be Dewey's second strongest state after Kansas. Dewey's margin of victory was the most for any candidate since Roosevelt himself in 1932 and the most for a Republican since Herbert Hoover in 1928.

== Results ==
1944 United States presidential election in Nebraska
Party	Candidate	Votes	%
Republican	Thomas E. Dewey	329,880	58.58%
Democratic	Franklin D. Roosevelt (inc.)	233,246	41.42%
Total votes		563,126	100.00%

=== Results by county ===
County	Thomas Edmund Dewey Republican		Franklin Delano Roosevelt Democratic		Margin		Total votes cast
County	#	%	#	%	#	%	Total votes cast
Adams	7,165	60.84%	4,612	39.16%	2,553	21.68%	11,777
Antelope	3,888	70.61%	1,618	29.39%	2,270	41.23%	5,506
Arthur	268	63.66%	153	36.34%	115	27.32%	421
Banner	378	71.05%	154	28.95%	224	42.11%	532
Blaine	366	59.61%	248	40.39%	118	19.22%	614
Boone	2,865	63.25%	1,665	36.75%	1,200	26.49%	4,530
Box Butte	2,994	63.30%	1,736	36.70%	1,258	26.60%	4,730
Boyd	1,456	61.93%	895	38.07%	561	23.86%	2,351
Brown	1,549	67.52%	745	32.48%	804	35.05%	2,294
Buffalo	6,073	61.19%	3,852	38.81%	2,221	22.38%	9,925
Burt	3,189	59.60%	2,162	40.40%	1,027	19.19%	5,351
Butler	2,493	46.04%	2,922	53.96%	-429	-7.92%	5,415
Cass	4,588	59.34%	3,144	40.66%	1,444	18.68%	7,732
Cedar	3,616	66.29%	1,839	33.71%	1,777	32.58%	5,455
Chase	1,444	69.02%	648	30.98%	796	38.05%	2,092
Cherry	2,314	62.80%	1,371	37.20%	943	25.59%	3,685
Cheyenne	2,654	60.24%	1,752	39.76%	902	20.47%	4,406
Clay	3,375	68.81%	1,530	31.19%	1,845	37.61%	4,905
Colfax	2,314	51.51%	2,178	48.49%	136	3.03%	4,492
Cuming	4,008	74.10%	1,401	25.90%	2,607	48.20%	5,409
Custer	5,330	61.61%	3,321	38.39%	2,009	23.22%	8,651
Dakota	1,703	46.13%	1,989	53.87%	-286	-7.75%	3,692
Dawes	2,747	65.50%	1,447	34.50%	1,300	31.00%	4,194
Dawson	5,017	68.85%	2,270	31.15%	2,747	37.70%	7,287
Deuel	1,125	73.48%	406	26.52%	719	46.96%	1,531
Dixon	2,382	61.95%	1,463	38.05%	919	23.90%	3,845
Dodge	6,803	61.39%	4,278	38.61%	2,525	22.79%	11,081
Douglas	53,443	45.60%	63,762	54.40%	-10,319	-8.80%	117,205
Dundy	1,320	68.29%	613	31.71%	707	36.58%	1,933
Fillmore	3,362	65.28%	1,788	34.72%	1,574	30.56%	5,150
Franklin	2,085	68.27%	969	31.73%	1,116	36.54%	3,054
Frontier	1,855	70.99%	758	29.01%	1,097	41.98%	2,613
Furnas	2,870	68.35%	1,329	31.65%	1,541	36.70%	4,199
Gage	7,352	63.43%	4,238	36.57%	3,114	26.87%	11,590
Garden	1,248	69.76%	541	30.24%	707	39.52%	1,789
Garfield	896	68.71%	408	31.29%	488	37.42%	1,304
Gosper	935	65.89%	484	34.11%	451	31.78%	1,419
Grant	327	65.53%	172	34.47%	155	31.06%	499
Greeley	1,242	49.54%	1,265	50.46%	-23	-0.92%	2,507
Hall	7,651	61.61%	4,768	38.39%	2,883	23.21%	12,419
Hamilton	3,057	69.68%	1,330	30.32%	1,727	39.37%	4,387
Harlan	1,991	66.43%	1,006	33.57%	985	32.87%	2,997
Hayes	782	66.89%	387	33.11%	395	33.79%	1,169
Hitchcock	1,556	63.95%	877	36.05%	679	27.91%	2,433
Holt	4,198	62.07%	2,565	37.93%	1,633	24.15%	6,763
Hooker	330	76.21%	103	23.79%	227	52.42%	433
Howard	1,556	43.25%	2,042	56.75%	-486	-13.51%	3,598
Jefferson	4,257	66.06%	2,187	33.94%	2,070	32.12%	6,444
Johnson	2,649	72.22%	1,019	27.78%	1,630	44.44%	3,668
Kearney	1,782	58.45%	1,267	41.55%	515	16.89%	3,049
Keith	1,739	60.26%	1,147	39.74%	592	20.51%	2,886
Keya Paha	781	70.04%	334	29.96%	447	40.09%	1,115
Kimball	1,169	66.99%	576	33.01%	593	33.98%	1,745
Knox	3,762	60.20%	2,487	39.80%	1,275	20.40%	6,249
Lancaster	26,715	58.01%	19,338	41.99%	7,377	16.02%	46,053
Lincoln	5,969	57.88%	4,344	42.12%	1,625	15.76%	10,313
Logan	450	64.84%	244	35.16%	206	29.68%	694
Loup	488	72.84%	182	27.16%	306	45.67%	670
Madison	6,892	67.14%	3,373	32.86%	3,519	34.28%	10,265
McPherson	310	72.43%	118	27.57%	192	44.86%	428
Merrick	2,691	65.94%	1,390	34.06%	1,301	31.88%	4,081
Morrill	1,998	64.33%	1,108	35.67%	890	28.65%	3,106
Nance	1,697	60.39%	1,113	39.61%	584	20.78%	2,810
Nemaha	3,267	64.67%	1,785	35.33%	1,482	29.33%	5,052
Nuckolls	2,685	62.56%	1,607	37.44%	1,078	25.12%	4,292
Otoe	5,291	66.51%	2,664	33.49%	2,627	33.02%	7,955
Pawnee	2,254	63.87%	1,275	36.13%	979	27.74%	3,529
Perkins	1,301	61.75%	806	38.25%	495	23.49%	2,107
Phelps	2,460	62.90%	1,451	37.10%	1,009	25.80%	3,911
Pierce	2,956	71.06%	1,204	28.94%	1,752	42.12%	4,160
Platte	4,509	56.67%	3,448	43.33%	1,061	13.33%	7,957
Polk	2,357	60.84%	1,517	39.16%	840	21.68%	3,874
Red Willow	3,107	59.31%	2,132	40.69%	975	18.61%	5,239
Richardson	4,482	56.27%	3,483	43.73%	999	12.54%	7,965
Rock	984	66.04%	506	33.96%	478	32.08%	1,490
Saline	3,255	45.50%	3,899	54.50%	-644	-9.00%	7,154
Sarpy	2,641	49.88%	2,654	50.12%	-13	-0.25%	5,295
Saunders	6,615	61.17%	4,199	38.83%	2,416	22.34%	10,814
Scotts Bluff	6,947	65.05%	3,733	34.95%	3,214	30.09%	10,680
Seward	3,721	64.11%	2,083	35.89%	1,638	28.22%	5,804
Sheridan	2,570	71.37%	1,031	28.63%	1,539	42.74%	3,601
Sherman	1,309	45.25%	1,584	54.75%	-275	-9.51%	2,893
Sioux	876	68.22%	408	31.78%	468	36.45%	1,284
Stanton	1,682	65.81%	874	34.19%	808	31.61%	2,556
Thayer	3,554	68.37%	1,644	31.63%	1,910	36.74%	5,198
Thomas	338	61.23%	214	38.77%	124	22.46%	552
Thurston	1,584	49.25%	1,632	50.75%	-48	-1.49%	3,216
Valley	2,096	58.70%	1,475	41.30%	621	17.39%	3,571
Washington	2,844	55.57%	2,274	44.43%	570	11.14%	5,118
Wayne	2,886	73.87%	1,021	26.13%	1,865	47.73%	3,907
Webster	2,523	69.75%	1,094	30.25%	1,429	39.51%	3,617
Wheeler	392	55.84%	310	44.16%	82	11.68%	702
York	4,885	72.99%	1,808	27.01%	3,077	45.97%	6,693
Totals	329,880	58.58%	233,246	41.42%		17.16%	563,126

==== Counties that flipped from Republican to Democratic ====
- Greeley

== See also ==
- United States presidential elections in Nebraska
