= Gosper County, Nebraska =

County in Nebraska, United States

- County
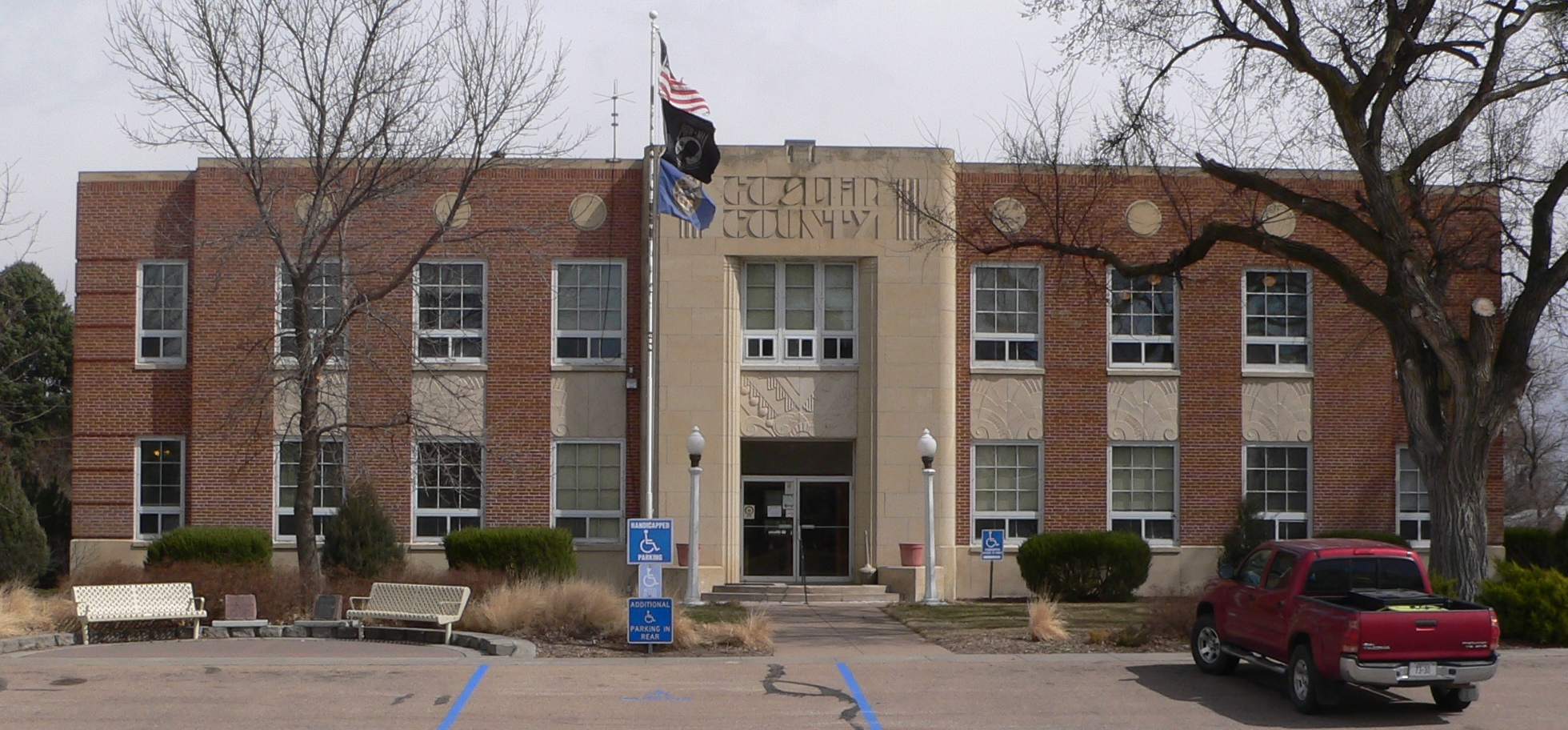
- Gosper County Courthouse in Elwood

- Location within the U.S. state of Nebraska
- Coordinates: 40°30′N 99°49′W
- Country: United States
- State: Nebraska
- Founded: 1873 (authorized); 1881 (organized)
- Named for: John J. Gosper
- Seat: Elwood
- Largest village: Elwood

Area
  - Total: 462.73 sq mi (1,198.5 km^{2})
  - Land: 458.16 sq mi (1,186.6 km^{2})
  - Water: 4.57 sq mi (11.8 km^{2})

Population (2020)
  - Total: 1,893
  - Estimate (2025): 1,803 ▼
  - Density: 4.13/sq mi (1.59/km^{2})
- Time zone: UTC−6 (Central)
  - Summer (DST): UTC−5 (CDT)
- Congressional district: 3rd
- Website: gospercountyne.gov

Gosper County is a county located in the U.S. state of Nebraska. As of the 2020 United States census, the population was 1,893. Its county seat is Elwood. The county was formed in 1873, and was organized in 1881. It was named for John J. Gosper, a Nebraska Secretary of State.

Gosper County is part of the Lexington, NE Micropolitan Statistical Area.

In the Nebraska license plate system, Gosper County is represented by the prefix 73 (it had the seventy-third-largest number of vehicles registered in the county when the license plate system was established in 1922).

== Geography ==
The Platte River flows easterly through the top part of Gosper County.

According to the US Census Bureau, the county has a total area of 463 square miles (1,200 km^{2}), of which 458 square miles (1,190 km^{2}) is land and 4.6 square miles (12 km^{2}) (1.0%) is water.

=== Major highways ===
- U.S. Highway 283
- Nebraska Highway 18
- Nebraska Highway 23

=== Adjacent counties ===
- Phelps County (east)
- Furnas County (south)
- Frontier County (west)
- Dawson County (north)

=== Protected areas ===
- Gosper National Wildlife Management Area
- Johnson Lake State Recreation Area
- Phillips Lake State Recreation Area

== Demographics ==
Historical population
Census	Pop.	Note	%±
1880	1,673		—
1890	4,816		187.9%
1900	5,301		10.1%
1910	4,933		−6.9%
1920	4,669		−5.4%
1930	4,287		−8.2%
1940	3,687		−14.0%
1950	2,734		−25.8%
1960	2,489		−9.0%
1970	2,178		−12.5%
1980	2,140		−1.7%
1990	1,928		−9.9%
2000	2,143		11.2%
2010	2,044		−4.6%
2020	1,893		−7.4%
2025 (est.)	1,803	▼	−4.8%
US Decennial Census; 1790–1960 1900–1990; 1990–2000 2010–2020

=== 2020 census ===
As of the 2020 census, the county had a population of 1,893. The median age was 47.8 years. 22.0% of residents were under the age of 18 and 25.4% of residents were 65 years of age or older. For every 100 females there were 101.8 males, and for every 100 females age 18 and over there were 102.7 males age 18 and over.

The racial makeup of the county was 93.9% White, 0.2% Black or African American, 0.2% American Indian and Alaska Native, 0.6% Asian, 0.1% Native Hawaiian and Pacific Islander, 1.3% from other races, and 3.8% from two or more races. Hispanic or Latino residents of any race comprised 5.0% of the population.

0.0% of residents lived in urban areas, while 100.0% lived in rural areas.

There were 789 households in the county, of which 25.3% had children under the age of 18 living with them and 18.0% had a female householder with no spouse or partner present. About 28.8% of all households were made up of individuals and 12.9% had someone living alone who was 65 years of age or older.

There were 1,148 housing units, of which 31.3% were vacant. Among occupied housing units, 75.5% were owner-occupied and 24.5% were renter-occupied. The homeowner vacancy rate was 1.1% and the rental vacancy rate was 10.6%.

=== 2000 census ===
As of the 2000 United States census, there were 2,143 people, 863 households, and 655 families in the county. The population density was 5 people per square mile (1.9 people/km^{2}). There were 1,281 housing units at an average density of 3 units per square mile (1.2/km^{2}).

The racial makeup of the county was 98.79% White, 0.14% Native American, 0.23% Asian, 0.42% from other races, and 0.42% from two or more races. 1.26% of the population were Hispanic or Latino of any race.

There were 863 households, out of which 29.90% had children under the age of 18 living with them, 69.10% were married couples living together, 3.90% had a female householder with no husband present, and 24.10% were non-families. 22.80% of all households were made up of individuals, and 10.50% had someone living alone who was 65 years of age or older. The average household size was 2.42 and the average family size was 2.83.

The median income for a household in the county was $36,827, and the median income for a family was $42,702. Males had a median income of $28,836 versus $21,204 for females. The per capita income for the county was $17,957. About 4.80% of families and 7.90% of the population were below the poverty line, including 11.10% of those under age 18 and 5.00% of those age 65 or over.

== Communities ==
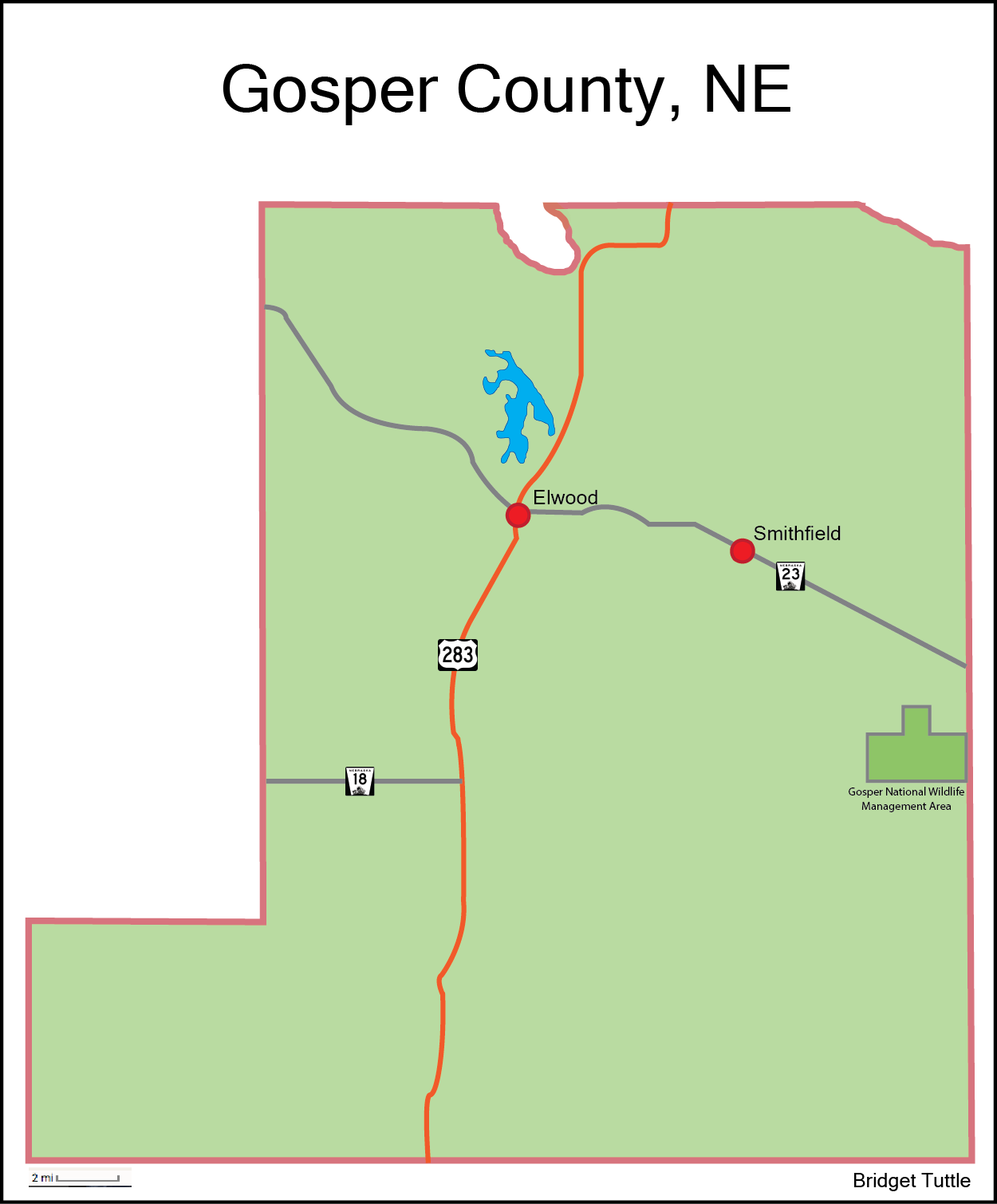
Gosper County, NE

=== Villages ===
- Elwood (county seat)
- Smithfield

=== Unincorporated community ===
- Johnson Lake

== Politics ==
Gosper County voters are reliably Republican. In no national election since 1936 has the county selected the Democratic Party candidate (as of 2024).

United States presidential election results for Gosper County, Nebraska
Year	Republican		Democratic		Third party(ies)	
Year	No.	%	No.	%	No.	%
1900	494	45.24%	570	52.20%	28	2.56%
1904	548	57.87%	154	16.26%	245	25.87%
1908	499	42.72%	634	54.28%	35	3.00%
1912	129	13.44%	524	54.58%	307	31.98%
1916	434	40.00%	617	56.87%	34	3.13%
1920	794	58.04%	486	35.53%	88	6.43%
1924	540	36.31%	394	26.50%	553	37.19%
1928	975	66.55%	480	32.76%	10	0.68%
1932	477	27.13%	1,263	71.84%	18	1.02%
1936	647	36.29%	1,118	62.70%	18	1.01%
1940	1,001	61.45%	628	38.55%	0	0.00%
1944	935	65.89%	484	34.11%	0	0.00%
1948	621	52.05%	572	47.95%	0	0.00%
1952	1,017	77.63%	293	22.37%	0	0.00%
1956	814	71.47%	325	28.53%	0	0.00%
1960	854	71.58%	339	28.42%	0	0.00%
1964	547	51.65%	512	48.35%	0	0.00%
1968	701	71.02%	229	23.20%	57	5.78%
1972	829	77.40%	242	22.60%	0	0.00%
1976	654	64.82%	332	32.90%	23	2.28%
1980	783	76.09%	181	17.59%	65	6.32%
1984	802	79.33%	201	19.88%	8	0.79%
1988	694	67.12%	331	32.01%	9	0.87%
1992	492	46.95%	254	24.24%	302	28.82%
1996	609	58.78%	275	26.54%	152	14.67%
2000	757	74.65%	228	22.49%	29	2.86%
2004	890	79.54%	222	19.84%	7	0.63%
2008	776	74.05%	260	24.81%	12	1.15%
2012	734	75.05%	230	23.52%	14	1.43%
2016	794	78.61%	166	16.44%	50	4.95%
2020	893	79.66%	215	19.18%	13	1.16%
2024	907	80.77%	203	18.08%	13	1.16%
