= McPherson County, Nebraska =

County in Nebraska, United States

- County
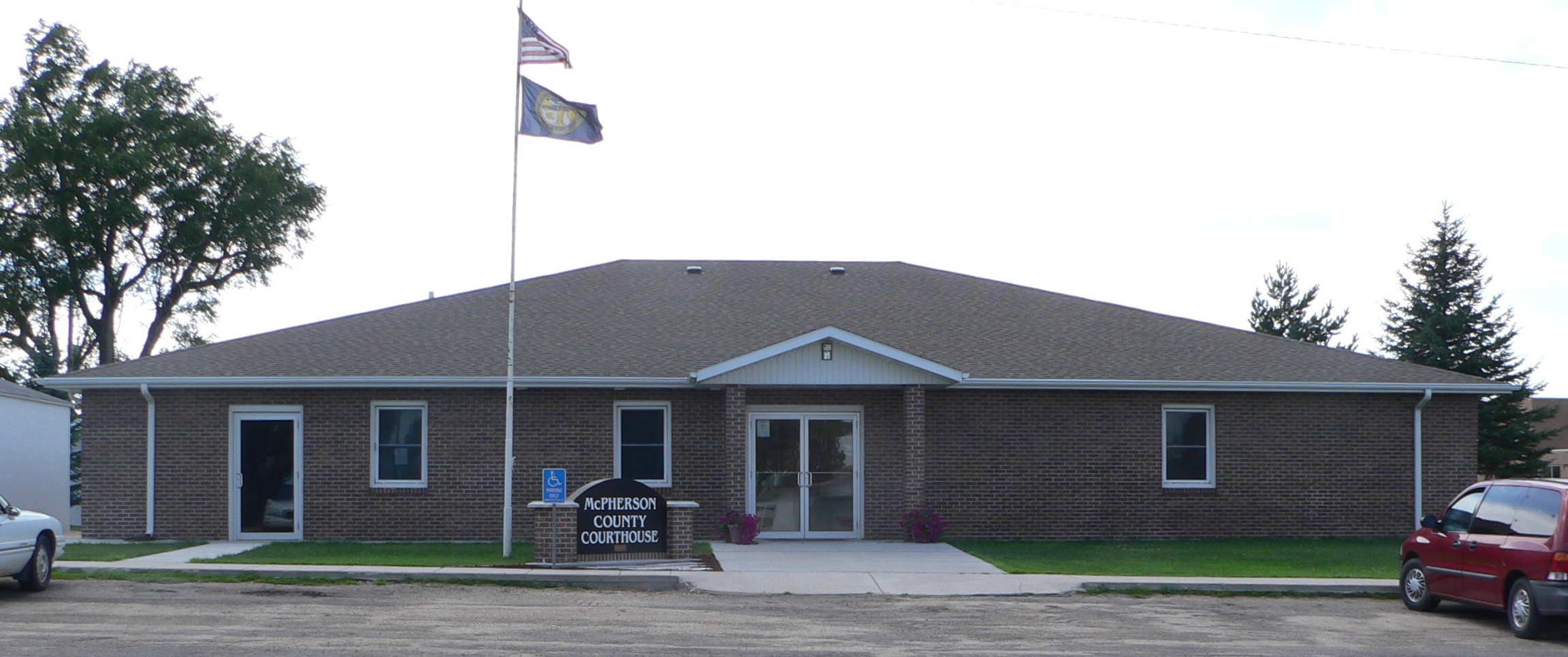
- The McPherson County Courthouse in Tryon

- Location within the U.S. state of Nebraska
- Coordinates: 41.648414°N 101.120851°W
- Country: United States
- State: Nebraska
- Founded: March 31, 1887
- Named for: James B. McPherson
- Seat: Tryon
- Largest community: Tryon

Area
  - Total: 860.290 sq mi (2,228.14 km^{2})
  - Land: 859.259 sq mi (2,225.47 km^{2})
  - Water: 1.031 sq mi (2.67 km^{2}) 0.12%

Population (2020)
  - Total: 399
  - Estimate (2025): 369 ▼
  - Density: 0.464/sq mi (0.179/km^{2})
- Time zone: UTC−6 (Central)
  - Summer (DST): UTC−5 (CDT)
- Area code: 308
- Congressional district: 3rd
- Website: mcphersoncounty.ne.gov
- • Nebraska county number 60 • Nebraska license plate prefix 90

McPherson County is a county in the U.S. state of Nebraska. As of the 2020 census, the population was 399, and was estimated to be 369 in 2025, making it the least populous county in Nebraska and the fifth-least populous county in the United States. The county seat and the largest city is Tryon.

McPherson County is part of the North Platte micropolitan area.

In the Nebraska license plate system, McPherson County was represented by the prefix "90" (as it had the 90th-largest number of vehicles registered in the state when the license plate system was established in 1922).

== History ==
McPherson county was formed on March 31, 1887 from Logan County; it was named for American Civil War General James B. McPherson.

In 1913, a portion of McPherson County was partitioned off to create Arthur County, giving McPherson County its present boundaries.

== Geography ==
According to the United States Census Bureau, the county has a total area of 860.290 square miles (2,228.14 km^{2}), of which 859.259 square miles (2,225.47 km^{2}) is land and 1.031 square miles (2.67 km^{2}) (0.12%) is water. It is the 23rd-largest county in Nebraska by total area.

The terrain of McPherson County consists of low rolling hills sloping to the south-southeast. A small portion of the area is under center pivot irrigation.

Most of Nebraska's 93 counties (the eastern 2/3, including McPherson County) observe Central Time; the western counties observe Mountain Time. McPherson County is the westernmost of the Nebraska counties to observe Central Time.

=== Adjacent counties ===
- Hooker County – north
- Thomas County – northeast
- Logan County – east
- Lincoln County – southeast
- Keith County – southwest (boundary of Mountain Time)
- Arthur County – west (boundary of Mountain Time)

=== Major highways ===
- Nebraska Highway 92
- Nebraska Highway 97

== Demographics ==
Historical population
Census	Pop.	Note	%±
1890	401		—
1900	517		28.9%
1910	2,470		377.8%
1920	1,692		−31.5%
1930	1,358		−19.7%
1940	1,175		−13.5%
1950	825		−29.8%
1960	735		−10.9%
1970	623		−15.2%
1980	593		−4.8%
1990	546		−7.9%
2000	533		−2.4%
2010	539		1.1%
2020	399		−26.0%
2025 (est.)	369	▼	−7.5%
U.S. Decennial Census; 1790–1960 1900–1990; 1990–2000 2010–2020

=== 2020 census ===
As of the 2020 census, the county had a population of 399. The median age was 48.8 years. 19.0% of residents were under the age of 18 and 22.3% of residents were 65 years of age or older. For every 100 females there were 102.5 males, and for every 100 females age 18 and over there were 94.6 males age 18 and over.

The racial makeup of the county was 94.7% White, 0.0% Black or African American, 1.0% American Indian and Alaska Native, 0.5% Asian, 0.0% Native Hawaiian and Pacific Islander, 0.3% from some other race, and 3.5% from two or more races. Hispanic or Latino residents of any race comprised 0.8% of the population.

0.0% of residents lived in urban areas, while 100.0% lived in rural areas.

There were 168 households in the county, of which 25.0% had children under the age of 18 living with them and 17.3% had a female householder with no spouse or partner present. About 23.8% of all households were made up of individuals and 11.9% had someone living alone who was 65 years of age or older.

There were 232 housing units, of which 27.6% were vacant. Among occupied housing units, 72.0% were owner-occupied and 28.0% were renter-occupied. The homeowner vacancy rate was 1.6% and the rental vacancy rate was 9.4%.

=== 2000 census ===
As of the 2000 census, there were 533 people, 202 households, and 157 families in the county. The population density was 0.6 people per square mile (0.23 people/km^{2}). There were 283 housing units at an average density of 0.3 units per square mile (0.12/km^{2}). The racial makeup of the county was 97.94% White, 0.38% Asian, 1.69% from other races. 1.50% of the population were Hispanic or Latino of any race. 44.4% were of German, 14.4% American, 9.2% Irish, 8.7% Swedish and 6.3% English ancestry.

There were 202 households, out of which 34.20% had children under the age of 18 living with them, 73.80% were married couples living together, 3.50% had a female householder with no husband present, and 21.80% were non-families. 19.80% of all households were made up of individuals, and 14.40% had someone living alone who was 65 years of age or older. The average household size was 2.64 and the average family size was 3.01.

The county population contained 27.60% under the age of 18, 5.30% from 18 to 24, 26.10% from 25 to 44, 22.90% from 45 to 64, and 18.20% who were 65 years of age or older. The median age was 41 years. For every 100 females, there were 99.60 males. For every 100 females age 18 and over, there were 97.90 males.

The median income for a household in the county was $25,750, and the median income for a family was $31,250. Males had a median income of $25,192 versus $13,393 for females. The per capita income for the county was $13,055. 16.20% of the population and 14.00% of families were below the poverty line. Out of the total people living in poverty, 21.70% are under the age of 18 and 17.30% are 65 or older.

== Communities ==
=== Census-designated place ===
- Tryon (county seat)

=== Unincorporated community ===
- Ringgold

=== Former communities ===
- Flats

== Politics ==
McPherson County voters have been strongly Republican since the beginning. In only two national elections since 1900, those being Woodrow Wilson's strong performance in 1916 and Franklin D. Roosevelt's landslide over Herbert Hoover in 1932 during the Great Depression has the county selected the Democratic Party candidate. In 2016, Democrat Hillary Clinton had the worst showing for a major party Presidential candidate in the county's history, tallying just 14 votes, or only 4.9%. She received fewer votes than any combined third-party or write-in votes, making it the only county in Nebraska for this to happen. In 2024, Democrat Kamala Harris performed even worse than Clinton, receiving only 12 votes or 4.2%.

Even during the strongly-Democratic era of the 1930s, the county would flip back into the Republican column when it voted for neighboring Kansas governor Alf Landon in 1936, and would be one of only 4 counties to give Wendell Willkie over 70% of the vote 4 years later. Roosevelt remains the last Democrat to receive 40% of its vote, and in fact, none of the party's nominees have even managed 30% since 1976, in the midst of a national blowback against Republicans during the Watergate scandal. Mike Dukakis is the last of his faction to garner 20%, which he did in 1988, while Barack Obama in 2012 is the final one to even manage double digits.

United States presidential election results for McPherson County, Nebraska
Year	Republican		Democratic		Third party(ies)	
Year	No.	%	No.	%	No.	%
1900	85	59.86%	54	38.03%	3	2.11%
1904	108	80.60%	12	8.96%	14	10.45%
1908	234	54.67%	165	38.55%	29	6.78%
1912	114	19.76%	180	31.20%	283	49.05%
1916	106	33.33%	184	57.86%	28	8.81%
1920	229	70.03%	75	22.94%	23	7.03%
1924	213	40.34%	96	18.18%	219	41.48%
1928	419	84.31%	69	13.88%	9	1.81%
1932	291	43.50%	367	54.86%	11	1.64%
1936	326	55.82%	250	42.81%	8	1.37%
1940	414	71.63%	164	28.37%	0	0.00%
1944	310	72.43%	118	27.57%	0	0.00%
1948	209	68.08%	98	31.92%	0	0.00%
1952	355	87.01%	53	12.99%	0	0.00%
1956	281	74.14%	98	25.86%	0	0.00%
1960	303	81.89%	67	18.11%	0	0.00%
1964	219	67.80%	104	32.20%	0	0.00%
1968	236	76.13%	40	12.90%	34	10.97%
1972	247	85.47%	42	14.53%	0	0.00%
1976	221	66.37%	104	31.23%	8	2.40%
1980	285	83.09%	49	14.29%	9	2.62%
1984	295	82.87%	57	16.01%	4	1.12%
1988	229	78.42%	60	20.55%	3	1.03%
1992	217	65.96%	49	14.89%	63	19.15%
1996	233	72.36%	50	15.53%	39	12.11%
2000	244	81.06%	48	15.95%	9	2.99%
2004	259	83.01%	49	15.71%	4	1.28%
2008	240	81.91%	45	15.36%	8	2.73%
2012	237	81.44%	41	14.09%	13	4.47%
2016	257	89.55%	14	4.88%	16	5.57%
2020	275	91.06%	17	5.63%	10	3.31%
2024	267	94.01%	12	4.23%	5	1.76%
