= Loup County, Nebraska =

County in Nebraska, United States

- County
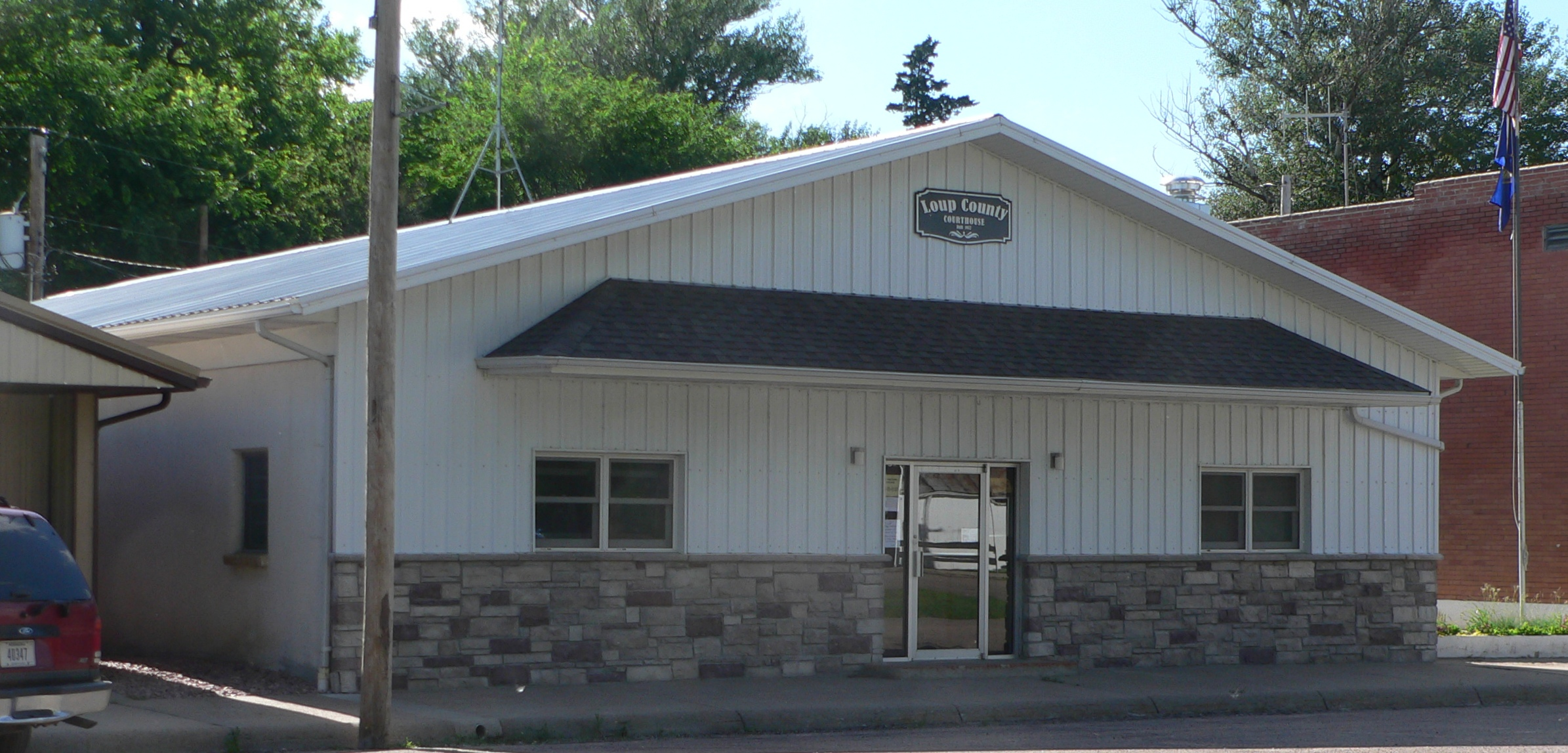
- Loup County Courthouse in Taylor

- Location within the U.S. state of Nebraska
- Coordinates: 41°56′N 99°27′W
- Country: United States
- State: Nebraska
- Founded: 1883
- Seat: Taylor
- Largest village: Taylor

Area
  - Total: 571 sq mi (1,480 km^{2})
  - Land: 568 sq mi (1,470 km^{2})
  - Water: 2.8 sq mi (7.3 km^{2}) 0.13%

Population (2020)
  - Total: 607
  - Estimate (2025): 570 ▼
  - Density: 1.07/sq mi (0.413/km^{2})
- Time zone: UTC−6 (Central)
  - Summer (DST): UTC−5 (CDT)
- Congressional district: 3rd
- Website: loupcounty.nebraska.gov

Loup County is a county in the U.S. state of Nebraska. As of the 2020 United States census, the population was 607, making it Nebraska's fifth-least populous county and the tenth-least populous county in the United States. Its county seat is Taylor. The county was named after the Pawnee Loup Indians.

In the Nebraska license plate system, Loup County is represented by the prefix 88 (it had the eighty-eighth-largest number of vehicles registered in the county when the license plate system was established in 1922).

== Geography ==
The terrain of Loup County consists of low corrugated flatland, sparsely used for agricultural purposes at present. The ground slopes to the southeast. The Calamus River runs southeastward through the upper center of the county, feeding into the Calamus Reservoir which lies on the county's east border. The North Loup River also runs southeastward through the lower center of the county, exiting eastward near the SE corner to run to its junction with the Calamus River at a point east of Loup County. The county has an area of 571 square miles (1,480 km^{2}), of which 568 square miles (1,470 km^{2}) is land and 2.8 square miles (7.3 km^{2}) (0.5%) is water.

=== Major highways ===
- U.S. Highway 183
- Nebraska Highway 91
- Nebraska Highway 96

=== Adjacent counties ===
- Holt County – northeast
- Garfield County – east
- Custer County – south
- Blaine County – west
- Brown County – northwest
- Rock County – north

=== Protected area ===
- Calamus River State Recreation Area

== Demographics ==
Historical population
Census	Pop.	Note	%±
1890	1,662		—
1900	1,305		−21.5%
1910	2,188		67.7%
1920	1,946		−11.1%
1930	1,818		−6.6%
1940	1,777		−2.3%
1950	1,348		−24.1%
1960	1,097		−18.6%
1970	854		−22.2%
1980	859		0.6%
1990	683		−20.5%
2000	712		4.2%
2010	632		−11.2%
2020	607		−4.0%
2025 (est.)	570	▼	−6.1%
US Decennial Census; 1790-1960 1900-1990; 1990-2000 2010 2020 2022

=== 2020 census ===
As of the 2020 census, the county had a population of 607. The median age was 50.5 years. 20.4% of residents were under the age of 18 and 26.2% of residents were 65 years of age or older. For every 100 females there were 101.7 males, and for every 100 females age 18 and over there were 104.7 males age 18 and over.

The racial makeup of the county was 93.1% White, 0.0% Black or African American, 0.0% American Indian and Alaska Native, 0.2% Asian, 0.0% Native Hawaiian and Pacific Islander, 1.3% from some other race, and 5.4% from two or more races. Hispanic or Latino residents of any race comprised 3.0% of the population.

0.0% of residents lived in urban areas, while 100.0% lived in rural areas.

There were 272 households in the county, of which 25.7% had children under the age of 18 living with them and 18.4% had a female householder with no spouse or partner present. About 21.0% of all households were made up of individuals and 9.2% had someone living alone who was 65 years of age or older.

There were 419 housing units, of which 35.1% were vacant. Among occupied housing units, 79.0% were owner-occupied and 21.0% were renter-occupied. The homeowner vacancy rate was 1.3% and the rental vacancy rate was 10.4%.

=== 2000 census ===
As of the 2000 United States census, there were 712 people, 289 households, and 206 families in the county. The population density was 1.1 people per square mile (0.42 people/km^{2}). There were 377 housing units at an average density of 0.7 units per square mile (0.27/km^{2}). The racial makeup of the county was 98.88% White, 0.28% Native American, 0.14% Asian, 0.42% from other races, and 0.28% from two or more races. 1.69% of the population were Hispanic or Latino of any race.

There were 289 households, out of which 31.80% had children under the age of 18 living with them, 64.70% were married couples living together, 4.20% had a female householder with no husband present, and 28.40% were non-families. 27.00% of all households were made up of individuals, and 17.00% had someone living alone who was 65 years of age or older. The average household size was 2.46 and the average family size was 2.99.

The county population contained 26.70% under the age of 18, 4.50% from 18 to 24, 22.30% from 25 to 44, 27.00% from 45 to 64, and 19.50% who were 65 years of age or older. The median age was 43 years. For every 100 females, there were 108.80 males. For every 100 females age 18 and over, there were 100.00 males.

The median income for a household in the county was $26,250, and the median income for a family was $27,788. Males had a median income of $20,515 versus $20,972 for females. The per capita income for the county was $12,427. About 14.20% of families and 17.70% of the population were below the poverty line, including 22.90% of those under age 18 and 11.60% of those age 65 or over.

== Communities ==
=== Village ===
- Taylor (county seat)

=== Unincorporated communities ===
- Almeria
- Pioneerville pop: 106 (2010)

=== Ghost towns ===
- Clothstock, Inhabited: 1899–1907, Highest population: 38 (1906)
- Pickiner, Inhabited: 1908–1926, Highest population: 76 (1918)

== Politics ==
Loup County voters have been strongly Republican since the beginning. In only two national elections since 1900 has the county selected the Democratic Party candidate.

United States presidential election results for Loup County, Nebraska
Year	Republican		Democratic		Third party(ies)	
Year	No.	%	No.	%	No.	%
1900	149	51.56%	137	47.40%	3	1.04%
1904	223	66.57%	23	6.87%	89	26.57%
1908	248	53.91%	170	36.96%	42	9.13%
1912	131	28.60%	113	24.67%	214	46.72%
1916	164	38.05%	219	50.81%	48	11.14%
1920	343	66.73%	117	22.76%	54	10.51%
1924	285	47.98%	105	17.68%	204	34.34%
1928	594	83.78%	106	14.95%	9	1.27%
1932	287	40.83%	389	55.33%	27	3.84%
1936	438	55.65%	335	42.57%	14	1.78%
1940	539	65.10%	289	34.90%	0	0.00%
1944	488	72.84%	182	27.16%	0	0.00%
1948	294	52.78%	263	47.22%	0	0.00%
1952	507	82.31%	109	17.69%	0	0.00%
1956	441	76.03%	139	23.97%	0	0.00%
1960	445	77.53%	129	22.47%	0	0.00%
1964	348	66.41%	176	33.59%	0	0.00%
1968	331	76.44%	64	14.78%	38	8.78%
1972	345	85.61%	58	14.39%	0	0.00%
1976	299	65.57%	140	30.70%	17	3.73%
1980	368	78.30%	74	15.74%	28	5.96%
1984	323	79.95%	79	19.55%	2	0.50%
1988	295	73.75%	98	24.50%	7	1.75%
1992	234	59.69%	59	15.05%	99	25.26%
1996	229	68.77%	74	22.22%	30	9.01%
2000	284	75.13%	84	22.22%	10	2.65%
2004	314	81.35%	68	17.62%	4	1.04%
2008	302	76.84%	86	21.88%	5	1.27%
2012	290	81.01%	62	17.32%	6	1.68%
2016	323	83.90%	48	12.47%	14	3.64%
2020	370	81.50%	75	16.52%	9	1.98%
2024	354	82.71%	73	17.06%	1	0.23%

== See also ==
- National Register of Historic Places listings in Loup County, Nebraska
