= Flats, Nebraska =

Unincorporated community in Nebraska, United States

- Ghost town
- Location within Nebraska Location within the United States
- Coordinates: 41.6°N 101.4°W
- Country: United States
- State: Nebraska
- County: McPherson

Flats is an extinct town in McPherson County, Nebraska, United States. The GNIS classifies it as a populated place.

== History ==
A post office was established at Flats in 1919, and remained in operation until it was discontinued in 1972. Flats derives its name from Lombard Flats, an early farm in the area.
