= Letan, Nebraska =

Unincorporated community in Nebraska, U.S.

Coordinates: 42°00′53″N 102°56′27″W

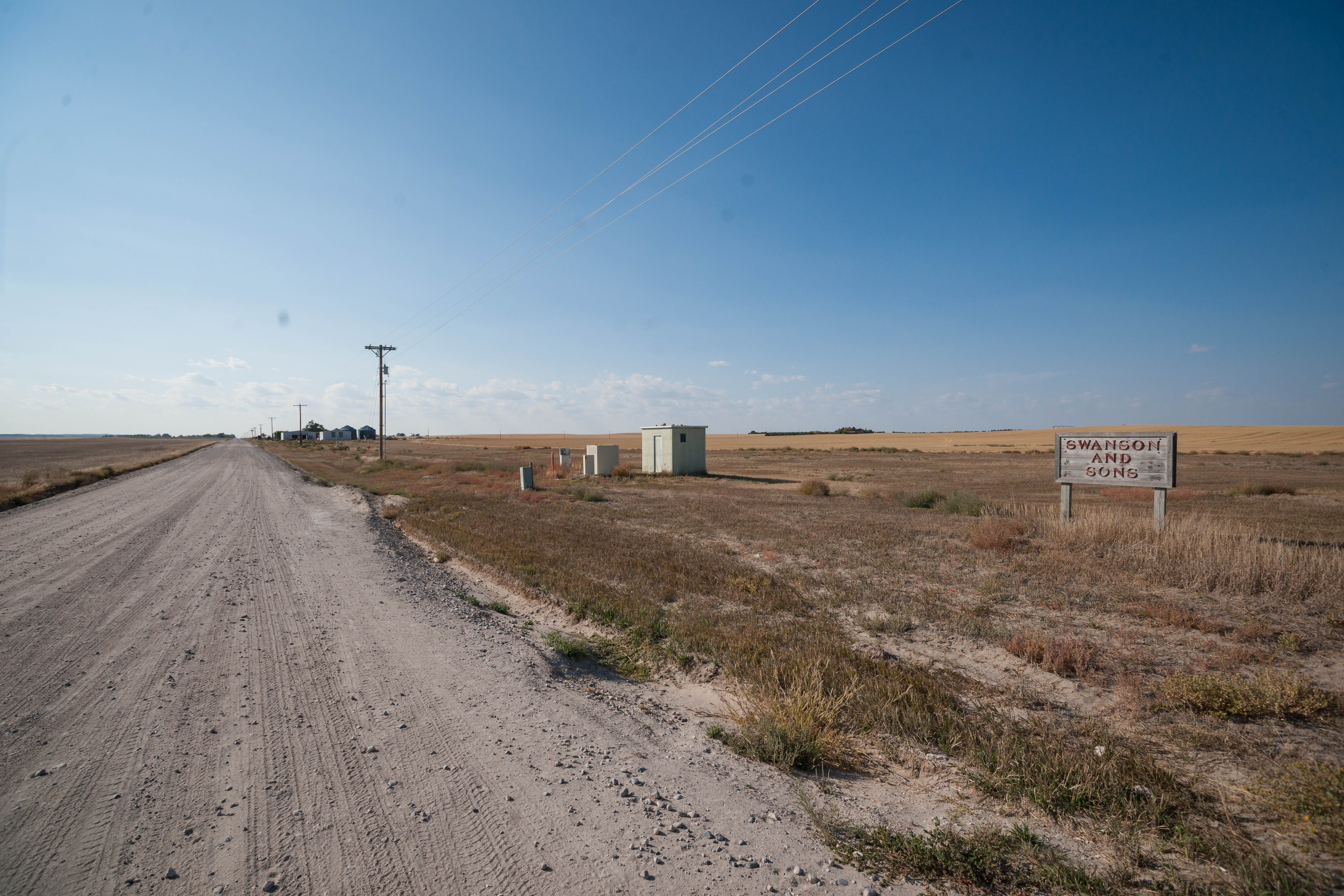
Letan, Nebraska

Letan is an unincorporated community in Box Butte County, Nebraska, United States.

== History ==
Letan was a station on the Chicago, Burlington and Quincy Railroad.
