= Robert Ball Anderson =

- Born: March 1, 1843; Green County, Kentucky
- Died: November 30, 1930 (aged 87); Union, Nebraska
- Burial place: Hemingford Cemetery
- Occupations: Slave, Soldier, Homesteader
- Spouse: Daisy Graham (married 1922)

Robert Ball Anderson (1 March 1843–30 November 1930) was an early African-American homesteader in Nebraska. Born into slavery, he served in the Union Army during the U.S. Civil War and later became one of Nebraska's largest black landowners.

== Early life ==
Anderson was born Robert Ball on the Ball Plantation in Green County, Kentucky, which was owned by a planter of the same name. His mother was also enslaved there, while his father was enslaved on a larger plantation nearby. While Anderson seems to have been a favorite of his master, his relationship with the planter's wife was much worse. She had Anderson's mother sold off to Louisiana when he was a child, and later had Anderson (who previously worked as a house servant and errand boy) sent out to labor in the fields. She reportedly treated him harshly, sometimes having him whipped and then rubbing pepper in his wounds.

== Military service ==
When he heard a Union recruiter was in the area, Anderson made up his mind to leave the plantation. It is not clear whether he escaped, or was tacitly allowed to leave. According to his memoir, Anderson first considered escaping, but then decided to discuss it with his then-master. He later recounted that: "At first he was angry, then he told me I would have to decide for myself what I wanted to do, and that if I wanted to go, for me to go. He seemed to sense the fact that the slavery of the past was over, and that a new era was opening up for all. We had quite a talk, and parted friends." However, his enlistment papers record his enlistment as being "without consent", indicating he had run away.

Anderson was officially mustered into the service of the United States on 22 April 1865 and was assigned to the 125th Colored Infantry for his three-year term of enlistment. His unit performed garrison duty around Louisville, Kentucky, but the war ended before it saw combat. For a time the unit was stationed at Fort Leavenworth, where it was involved in several skirmishes with Native Americans in the area, before being transferred to New Mexico – first to Fort Union, then Fort Craig and Fort Bliss. At the end of his enlistment, Anderson was discharged at Louisville.

== Homesteading ==
After his discharge, Anderson (he and his siblings had by this time taken this last name, rather than Ball) initially returned to the plantation where he had grown up, but found conditions there chaotic and unappealing. He lived for a time in Iowa, before ultimately deciding to move to Nebraska to pursue his dream of being an independent landowner. He purchased an ox team and paid for his journey by freighting goods into the state. He acquired land in Butler County under the Homestead Acts and worked to become a successful farmer, but his efforts were dashed by a string of calamities; the Panic of 1873 brought sustained low farm prices, while drought and several years of grasshopper infestations wreaked havoc on production. Anderson held out longer than most of his neighbors, but by 1881 was forced to give up his land and move on. He moved to Kansas, where he received his only formal education, and saved his wages in anticipation of another chance at independence.

His second chance came in 1884, when he was able to acquire more homestead land, this time in western Nebraska, in what would later be organized as Box Butte County. One of the first settlers in his area, he initially lived in a dugout shelter and sustained himself largely on wild game. Despite some early reversals, he was able to build a successful farming operation, adding to his landholdings by buying the acreage of neighbors who moved away. By 1902, he owned more than 1400 acres, and by 1910 he was the largest African-American landowner in the state. Ultimately he would own more than 2000 acres of land, before he quit farming in 1920.

== Later life ==
Anderson married a much younger woman, Daisy Graham, on 19 March 1922; he was 79, while she was 21.

He traveled widely in the United States and abroad, having visited Mexico and Cuba. This included returning to the plantation of his birth as a tourist, half a century after escaping from slavery there.

In 1930, Anderson was killed in a car accident near Union, Nebraska. He is buried at Hemingford Cemetery.

== Cultural legacy ==
Anderson wrote his memoir in 1927. Entitled From Slavery to Affluence, it was marketed to his neighbors in western Nebraska. His widow republished it in 1967 with a nineteen-page addition addressed to white Americans ignoring the ongoing racial inequalities. She was one of the last three widows of Civil War veterans, and possibly the last widow of an American slave.

He was mentioned in the 2015 inaugural speech of Nebraska governor Pete Ricketts, as an example of the settlers who had come to the state in search of a better life.
