= Tryon, Nebraska =

Census-designated place in and county seat of McPherson County, Nebraska, United States

- Census-designated place
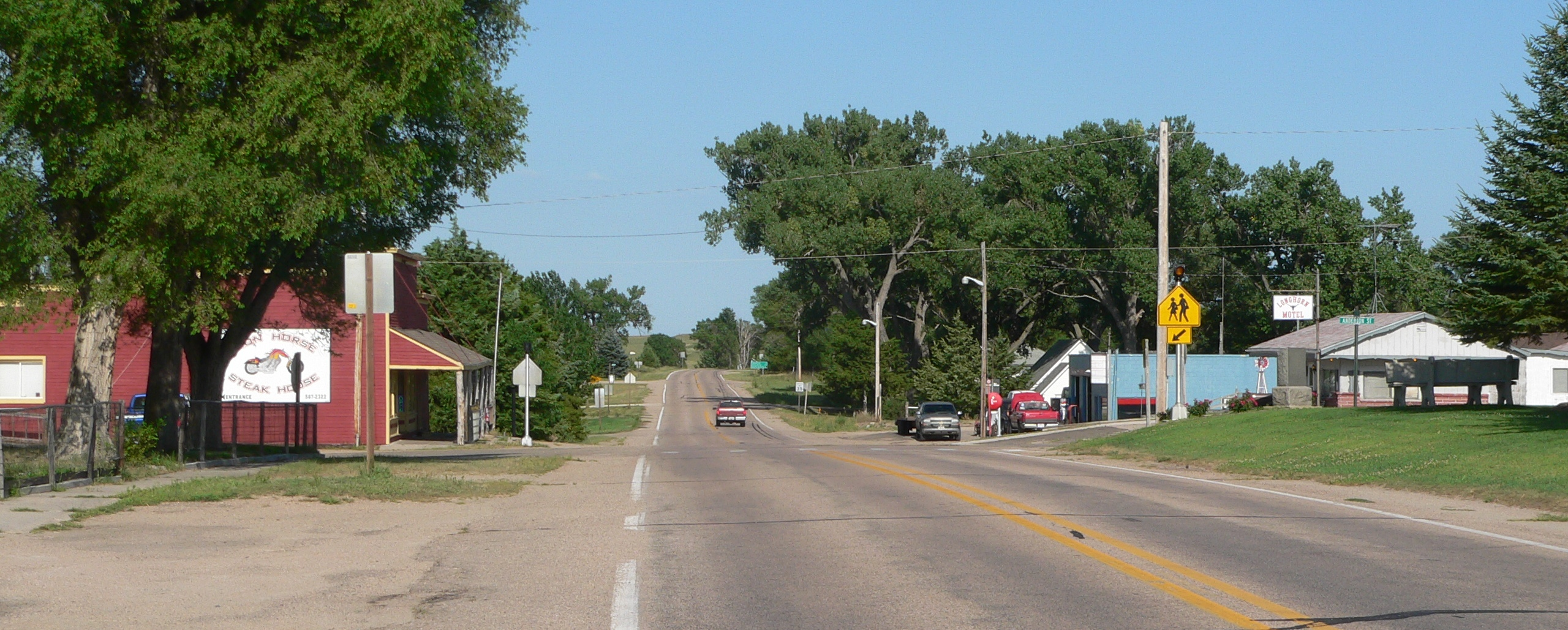
- Downtown Tryon: looking east along Nebraska Highway 92/97

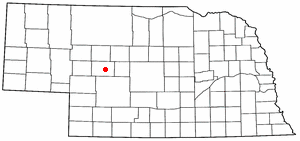
- Location in Nebraska
- Coordinates: 41°33′20″N 100°58′0″W
- Country: United States
- State: Nebraska
- County: McPherson

Area
  - Total: 1.19 sq mi (3.08 km^{2})
  - Land: 1.19 sq mi (3.08 km^{2})
  - Water: 0 sq mi (0.00 km^{2})

Population (2020)
  - Total: 107
  - Density: 89.9/sq mi (34.72/km^{2})
- Time zone: UTC-6 (Central (CST))
  - Summer (DST): UTC-5 (CDT)
- ZIP Code: 69167
- FIPS code: 31-49320

Tryon /ˈtraɪən/ is an unincorporated community and census-designated place (CDP) in McPherson County, Nebraska, United States. It is the county seat of McPherson County. The population was 107 at the 2020 census, down from 157 in 2010.

== History ==
Tryon was founded in 1890 as "McPherson". It was renamed Tryon in 1892; the source of this name is disputed.

== Geography ==
Tryon is located in east-central McPherson County at 41°33′20″N 100°58′0″W (41.555569, -100.966621). Nebraska Highways 92 and 97 pass through the center of town together. Highway 92 leads east 24 miles (39 km) to Stapleton and west 40 miles (64 km) to Arthur, while Highway 97 leads north 36 miles (58 km) to Mullen and south 35 miles (56 km) to North Platte.

According to the U.S. Census Bureau, the Tryon CDP has a total area of 1.2 square miles (3.1 km^{2}), all land.

== Demographics ==
Historical population
Census	Pop.	Note	%±
2000	90		—
2010	157		74.4%
2020	107		−31.8%
U.S. Decennial Census

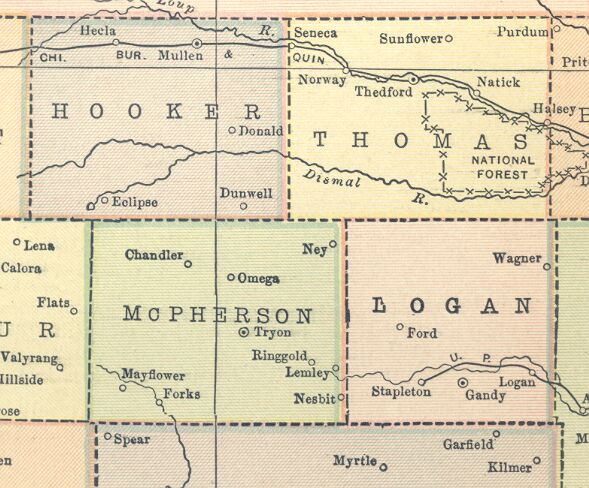
Tryon's location according to a 1914 atlas

Tryon is part of the North Platte Micropolitan Statistical Area.

As of the census of 2000, there were 90 people, 48 households, and 27 families residing in the community. The population density was 78.2 inhabitants per square mile (30.2/km^{2}). There were 54 housing units at an average density of 46.9 per square mile (18.1/km^{2}). The racial makeup of the community was 100.00% White.

There were 48 households, out of which 20.8% had children under the age of 18 living with them, 45.8% were married couples living together, 10.4% had a female householder with no husband present, and 43.8% were non-families. 43.8% of all households were made up of individuals, and 37.5% had someone living alone who was 65 years of age or older. The average household size was 1.88 and the average family size was 2.46.

In the community, the population was spread out, with 15.6% under the age of 18, 5.6% from 18 to 24, 25.6% from 25 to 44, 10.0% from 45 to 64, and 38.9% who were 65 years of age or older. The median age was 59.4 years. For every 100 females, there were 87.5 males. For every 100 females age 18 and over, there were 72.7 males.

== See also ==
- List of census-designated places in Nebraska
