= Box Butte County, Nebraska =

County in Nebraska, United States

- County
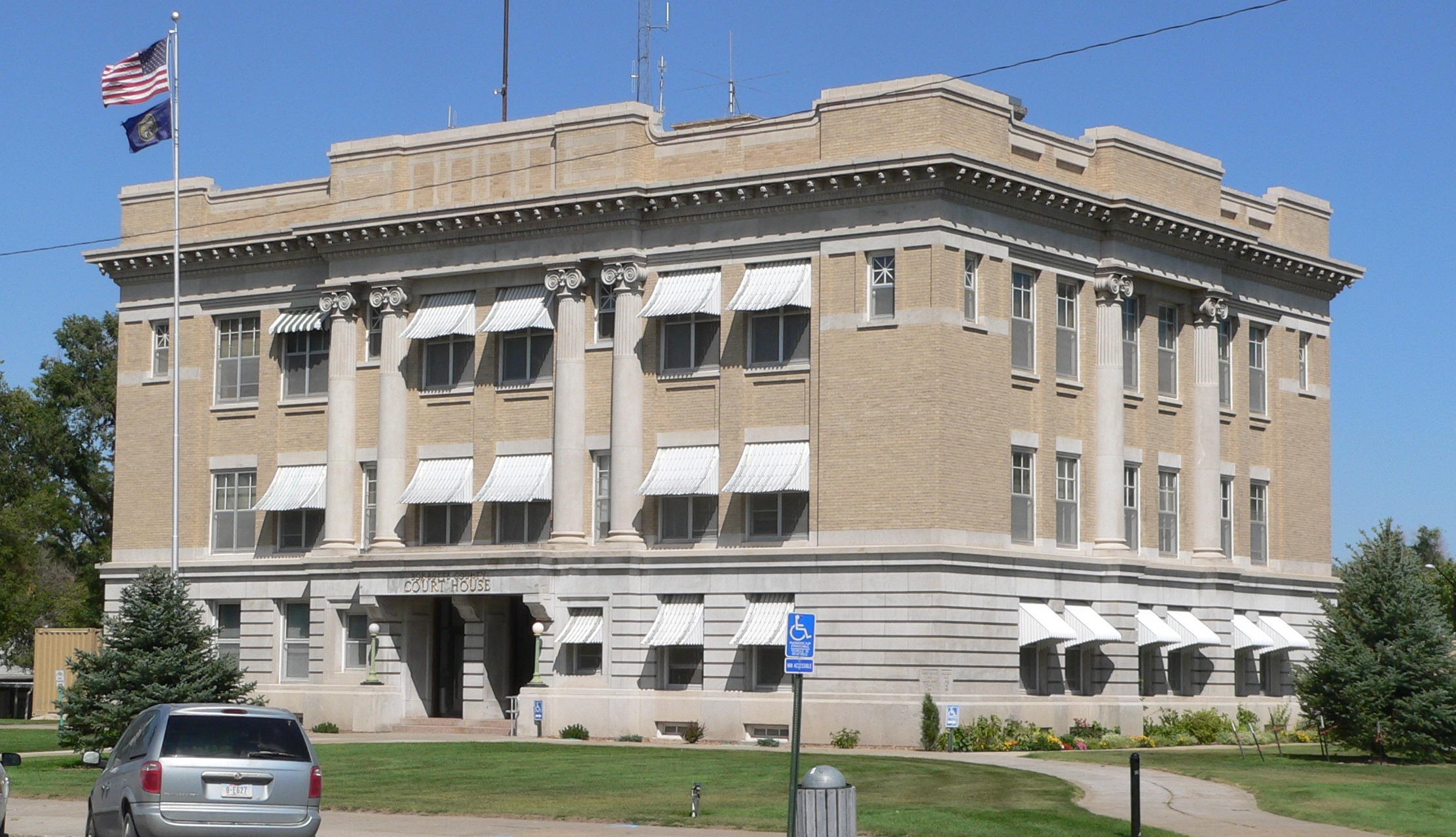
- The Box Butte County Courthouse in Alliance

- Logo

- Location within the U.S. state of Nebraska
- Coordinates: 42.210380°N 103.081779°W
- Country: United States
- State: Nebraska
- Founded: November 2, 1886
- Seat: Alliance
- Largest city: Alliance

Area
  - Total: 1,077.908 sq mi (2,791.77 km^{2})
  - Land: 1,075.233 sq mi (2,784.84 km^{2})
  - Water: 2.675 sq mi (6.93 km^{2}) 0.25%

Population (2020)
  - Total: 10,842
  - Estimate (2025): 10,494 ▼
  - Density: 10.083/sq mi (3.8932/km^{2})
- Time zone: UTC−7 (Mountain)
  - Summer (DST): UTC−6 (MDT)
- Area code: 308
- Congressional district: 3rd
- Website: boxbuttecountyne.gov
- • Nebraska county number 07 • Nebraska license plate prefix 65

Box Butte County is a county in the U.S. state of Nebraska. As of the 2020 census, the population was 10,842, and was estimated to be 10,494 in 2025. The county seat and largest city is Alliance.

In the Nebraska license plate system, Box Butte County was represented by the prefix "65" (as it had the 65th-largest number of vehicles registered in the state when the license plate system was established in 1922).

== History ==
Box Butte County was created on November 2, 1886, it took its name from a large box-shaped butte north of Alliance.

Box Butte County was formed as part of a series of partitioning of the Nebraska Panhandle. In 1883, the Nebraska legislature divided the Panhandle into two counties, Sioux and Cheyenne. In 1885 the original Sioux County was divided into three counties: Sioux, Dawes, and Sheridan. Because of the distance to the county seat of Chadron, residents of southern Dawes County asked that it be split off; in 1886, the legislature created Box Butte County. The new county was named after a butte in the northern part of the county; before the county's formation, its name had been used in advertisements by railroad companies seeking to entice settlers to the area.

== Geography ==
According to the United States Census Bureau, the county has a total area of 1,077.908 square miles (2,791.77 km^{2}), of which 1,075.233 square miles (2,784.84 km^{2}) is land and 2.675 square miles (6.93 km^{2}) (0.25%) is water. It is the 13th-largest county in Nebraska by total area.

=== Major highways ===
- US 385
- Nebraska Highway 2
- Nebraska Highway 71
- Nebraska Highway 87

=== Adjacent counties ===
- Dawes County – north
- Sheridan County – east
- Morrill County – south
- Scotts Bluff County – southwest
- Sioux County – west

== Demographics ==
Historical population
Census	Pop.	Note	%±
1890	5,494		—
1900	5,572		1.4%
1910	6,131		10.0%
1920	8,407		37.1%
1930	11,861		41.1%
1940	10,736		−9.5%
1950	12,279		14.4%
1960	11,688		−4.8%
1970	10,094		−13.6%
1980	13,696		35.7%
1990	13,130		−4.1%
2000	12,158		−7.4%
2010	11,308		−7.0%
2020	10,842		−4.1%
2025 (est.)	10,494	▼	−3.2%
U.S. Decennial Census; 1790–1960 1900–1990; 1990–2000 2010–2020

=== 2020 census ===
As of the 2020 census, the county had a population of 10,842. The median age was 40.7 years. 24.5% of residents were under the age of 18 and 19.7% of residents were 65 years of age or older. For every 100 females there were 99.7 males, and for every 100 females age 18 and over there were 99.4 males age 18 and over.

The racial makeup of the county was 83.6% White, 0.6% Black or African American, 3.4% American Indian and Alaska Native, 0.7% Asian, 0.0% Native Hawaiian and Pacific Islander, 3.8% from some other race, and 7.9% from two or more races. Hispanic or Latino residents of any race comprised 11.5% of the population.

74.9% of residents lived in urban areas, while 25.1% lived in rural areas.

There were 4,566 households in the county, of which 28.6% had children under the age of 18 living with them and 22.7% had a female householder with no spouse or partner present. About 31.9% of all households were made up of individuals and 13.3% had someone living alone who was 65 years of age or older.

There were 5,234 housing units, of which 12.8% were vacant. Among occupied housing units, 69.4% were owner-occupied and 30.6% were renter-occupied. The homeowner vacancy rate was 1.9% and the rental vacancy rate was 17.4%.

=== 2000 census ===
As of the 2000 census, there were 12,158 people, 4,780 households, and 3,298 families in the county. The population density was 11 people per square mile (4.2 people/km^{2}). There were 5,488 housing units at an average density of 5 units per square mile (1.9/km^{2}). The racial makeup of the county was 90.84% White, 0.37% Black or African American, 2.74% Native American, 0.53% Asian, 0.01% Pacific Islander, 3.55% from other races, and 1.96% from two or more races. 7.65% of the population were Hispanic or Latino of any race. 36.4% were of German, 8.4% English, 8.1% Irish and 5.3% American ancestry.

There were 4,780 households, out of which 35.60% had children under the age of 18 living with them, 57.70% were married couples living together, 8.30% had a female householder with no husband present, and 31.00% were non-families. 27.50% of all households were made up of individuals, and 11.10% had someone living alone who was 65 years of age or older. The average household size was 2.50 and the average family size was 3.05.

The county population contained 28.10% under the age of 18, 7.40% from 18 to 24, 26.80% from 25 to 44, 23.10% from 45 to 64, and 14.60% who were 65 years of age or older. The median age was 38 years. For every 100 females there were 99.20 males. For every 100 females age 18 and over, there were 94.60 males.

The median income for a household in the county was $39,366 and the median income for a family was $46,670. Males had a median income of $36,966 versus $21,762 for females. The per capita income for the county was $18,407. About 9.70% of families and 10.70% of the population were below the poverty line, including 13.70% of those under age 18 and 11.00% of those age 65 or over.

== Communities ==
=== City ===
- Alliance (county seat)

=== Village ===
- Hemingford

=== Census-designated place ===
- Berea

=== Other unincorporated places ===
- Letan
- Nonpareil

== Politics ==
Box Butte County voters have been reliably Republican for decades; since 1940, the county has selected the Republican Party presidential candidate in every national election (as of 2024).

Political Party	Number of registered voters (March 1, 2026)	Percent
Republican	4,376	64.16%
Independent	1,309	19.19%
Democratic	1,010	14.81%
Libertarian	86	1.26%
Legal Marijuana Now	39	0.57%
Total	6,820	100.00%

United States presidential election results for Box Butte County, Nebraska
Year	Republican		Democratic		Third party(ies)	
Year	No.	%	No.	%	No.	%
1900	707	57.43%	494	40.13%	30	2.44%
1904	668	66.73%	217	21.68%	116	11.59%
1908	600	45.05%	684	51.35%	48	3.60%
1912	227	17.68%	518	40.34%	539	41.98%
1916	591	37.64%	914	58.22%	65	4.14%
1920	1,630	65.12%	756	30.20%	117	4.67%
1924	1,506	42.48%	814	22.96%	1,225	34.56%
1928	3,028	70.71%	1,238	28.91%	16	0.37%
1932	1,772	39.16%	2,688	59.40%	65	1.44%
1936	1,711	36.69%	2,900	62.19%	52	1.12%
1940	2,942	57.27%	2,195	42.73%	0	0.00%
1944	2,994	63.30%	1,736	36.70%	0	0.00%
1948	2,351	53.75%	2,023	46.25%	0	0.00%
1952	4,426	78.13%	1,239	21.87%	0	0.00%
1956	2,991	68.71%	1,362	31.29%	0	0.00%
1960	3,157	62.60%	1,886	37.40%	0	0.00%
1964	2,725	58.07%	1,968	41.93%	0	0.00%
1968	2,728	67.47%	1,052	26.02%	263	6.51%
1972	3,431	78.14%	960	21.86%	0	0.00%
1976	2,956	64.56%	1,516	33.11%	107	2.34%
1980	3,912	70.72%	1,208	21.84%	412	7.45%
1984	4,011	72.60%	1,471	26.62%	43	0.78%
1988	3,253	56.42%	2,468	42.80%	45	0.78%
1992	2,203	38.74%	1,942	34.15%	1,542	27.11%
1996	2,458	49.41%	1,782	35.82%	735	14.77%
2000	3,208	63.04%	1,614	31.72%	267	5.25%
2004	3,396	65.92%	1,657	32.16%	99	1.92%
2008	2,932	58.89%	1,886	37.88%	161	3.23%
2012	2,869	60.98%	1,692	35.96%	144	3.06%
2016	3,617	73.46%	965	19.60%	342	6.95%
2020	4,002	76.96%	1,051	20.21%	147	2.83%
2024	3,827	77.52%	1,043	21.13%	67	1.36%

== Notable people ==
- Robert Ball Anderson, early homesteader

== See also ==
- National Register of Historic Places listings in Box Butte County, Nebraska
