= 1940 United States presidential election in Nebraska =

- November 5, 1940

All 7 Nebraska votes to the Electoral College

Nominee	Wendell Willkie	Franklin D. Roosevelt
Party	Republican	Democratic
Home state	New York	New York
Running mate	Charles L. McNary	Henry A. Wallace
Electoral vote	7	0
Popular vote	352,201	263,677
Percentage	57.19%	42.81%
County results
Willkie
50–60%
60–70%
70–80%
Roosevelt
50–60%
President before election
Franklin D. Roosevelt
Democratic
Elected President
Franklin D. Roosevelt
Democratic

The 1940 United States presidential election in Nebraska took place on November 5, 1940, as part of the 1940 United States presidential election. Voters chose seven representatives, or electors, to the Electoral College, who v oted for president and vice president.

Nebraska was won by the Republican candidate, business man Wendell Willkie, running with Senate Minority Leader Charles L. McNary, with 57.19% of the popular vote, against incumbent Democratic President Franklin D. Roosevelt, running with Secretary Henry A. Wallace, with 42.81% of the popular vote.

Though he had carried the state by over 16 points just four years earlier in 1936, Roosevelt's popularity with Nebraskans completely eroded in 1940, and with 57.19% of the popular vote, the state would prove to be Willkie's second strongest state in the 1940 election, after neighboring South Dakota. Roosevelt lost the state by almost exactly the same margin as he had carried it four years prior. This constituted a Republican victory margin of 14.4%, with the results in Nebraska representing a very large 30.8% shift to the right from 1936. Nebraska weighed in as a drastic 24.3% more Republican than the nation as whole. Roosevelt became the first Democrat since Grover Cleveland in 1892 to win the presidency without carrying Nebraska.

Key to Willkie's landslide victory was his overperformance among rural farmers in Nebraska, whom Roosevelt had carried decisively in 1936. Willkie flipped 39 counties that had been reliably Democratic just 4 years earlier, those being: Banner, Blaine, Box Butte, Boyd, Burt, Chase, Cherry, Cheyenne, Cuming, Custer, Dawes, Dawson, Deuel, Dodge, Dundy, Frontier, Gosper, Grant, Harlan, Hayes, Hitchcock, Holt, Keith, Kimball, Knox, Madison, Merrick, Morrill, Pawnee, Perkins, Phelps, Pierce, Red Willow, Scotts Bluff, Sheridan, Sioux, Stanton, Thomas and Wayne.

The 1940 election would mark a turning point in Nebraska's politics; the state has voted for the Republican nominee by double digits in every election since, except for when Lyndon B. Johnson carried it by a relatively narrow margin of 5.2% amidst a national landslide victory. This can at least partly be attributed to the fact that Roosevelt was running for his third consecutive term, and many voters were wary of breaking the long-standing two term tradition. This sentiment was particularly strong in the Great Plains and Upper Midwest regions.

== Results ==
1940 United States presidential election in Nebraska
Party	Candidate	Votes	%
Republican	Wendell Willkie	352,201	57.19%
Democratic	Franklin D. Roosevelt (inc.)	263,677	42.81%
Total votes		615,878	100%

=== Results by county ===
County	Wendell Lewis Willkie Republican		Franklin Delano Roosevelt Democratic		Margin		Total votes cast
County	#	%	#	%	#	%	Total votes cast
Adams	6,630	60.60%	4,311	39.40%	2,319	21.20%	10,941
Antelope	4,331	66.77%	2,155	33.23%	2,176	33.55%	6,486
Arthur	348	64.21%	194	35.79%	154	28.41%	542
Banner	450	66.57%	226	33.43%	224	33.14%	676
Blaine	454	59.35%	311	40.65%	143	18.69%	765
Boone	3,334	62.34%	2,014	37.66%	1,320	24.68%	5,348
Box Butte	2,942	57.27%	2,195	42.73%	747	14.54%	5,137
Boyd	1,734	62.13%	1,057	37.87%	677	24.26%	2,791
Brown	1,783	64.65%	975	35.35%	808	29.30%	2,758
Buffalo	6,387	61.14%	4,060	38.86%	2,327	22.27%	10,447
Burt	3,443	57.08%	2,589	42.92%	854	14.16%	6,032
Butler	2,966	47.75%	3,246	52.25%	-280	-4.51%	6,212
Cass	4,704	56.46%	3,627	43.54%	1,077	12.93%	8,331
Cedar	4,397	62.67%	2,619	37.33%	1,778	25.34%	7,016
Chase	1,557	63.27%	904	36.73%	653	26.53%	2,461
Cherry	2,705	60.30%	1,781	39.70%	924	20.60%	4,486
Cheyenne	2,394	55.20%	1,943	44.80%	451	10.40%	4,337
Clay	3,576	66.98%	1,763	33.02%	1,813	33.96%	5,339
Colfax	2,587	52.28%	2,361	47.72%	226	4.57%	4,948
Cuming	4,383	73.32%	1,595	26.68%	2,788	46.64%	5,978
Custer	6,269	59.66%	4,238	40.34%	2,031	19.33%	10,507
Dakota	2,140	46.91%	2,422	53.09%	-282	-6.18%	4,562
Dawes	3,184	64.26%	1,771	35.74%	1,413	28.52%	4,955
Dawson	5,445	66.02%	2,803	33.98%	2,642	32.03%	8,248
Deuel	1,156	67.17%	565	32.83%	591	34.34%	1,721
Dixon	3,038	61.37%	1,912	38.63%	1,126	22.75%	4,950
Dodge	7,141	62.51%	4,282	37.49%	2,859	25.03%	11,423
Douglas	53,325	44.38%	66,840	55.62%	-13,515	-11.25%	120,165
Dundy	1,441	64.22%	803	35.78%	638	28.43%	2,244
Fillmore	3,677	65.13%	1,969	34.87%	1,708	30.25%	5,646
Franklin	2,354	63.08%	1,378	36.92%	976	26.15%	3,732
Frontier	2,069	66.08%	1,062	33.92%	1,007	32.16%	3,131
Furnas	3,316	64.85%	1,797	35.15%	1,519	29.71%	5,113
Gage	8,156	61.55%	5,096	38.45%	3,060	23.09%	13,252
Garden	1,351	64.73%	736	35.27%	615	29.47%	2,087
Garfield	1,053	66.39%	533	33.61%	520	32.79%	1,586
Gosper	1,001	61.45%	628	38.55%	373	22.90%	1,629
Grant	423	63.51%	243	36.49%	180	27.03%	666
Greeley	1,530	50.46%	1,502	49.54%	28	0.92%	3,032
Hall	7,412	61.26%	4,687	38.74%	2,725	22.52%	12,099
Hamilton	3,286	66.36%	1,666	33.64%	1,620	32.71%	4,952
Harlan	2,182	61.73%	1,353	38.27%	829	23.45%	3,535
Hayes	759	55.93%	598	44.07%	161	11.86%	1,357
Hitchcock	1,663	58.33%	1,188	41.67%	475	16.66%	2,851
Holt	4,840	61.61%	3,016	38.39%	1,824	23.22%	7,856
Hooker	403	73.27%	147	26.73%	256	46.55%	550
Howard	1,696	43.11%	2,238	56.89%	-542	-13.78%	3,934
Jefferson	4,980	64.35%	2,759	35.65%	2,221	28.70%	7,739
Johnson	2,919	68.26%	1,357	31.74%	1,562	36.53%	4,276
Kearney	1,792	53.44%	1,561	46.56%	231	6.89%	3,353
Keith	2,022	53.48%	1,759	46.52%	263	6.96%	3,781
Keya Paha	1,004	66.67%	502	33.33%	502	33.33%	1,506
Kimball	1,190	61.82%	735	38.18%	455	23.64%	1,925
Knox	4,352	57.79%	3,179	42.21%	1,173	15.58%	7,531
Lancaster	27,384	58.63%	19,321	41.37%	8,063	17.26%	46,705
Lincoln	5,908	54.36%	4,960	45.64%	948	8.72%	10,868
Logan	498	60.51%	325	39.49%	173	21.02%	823
Loup	539	65.10%	289	34.90%	250	30.19%	828
Madison	7,353	64.87%	3,982	35.13%	3,371	29.74%	11,335
McPherson	414	71.63%	164	28.37%	250	43.25%	578
Merrick	2,886	66.31%	1,466	33.69%	1,420	32.63%	4,352
Morrill	2,214	60.08%	1,471	39.92%	743	20.16%	3,685
Nance	1,963	57.77%	1,435	42.23%	528	15.54%	3,398
Nemaha	3,817	59.96%	2,549	40.04%	1,268	19.92%	6,366
Nuckolls	3,017	61.70%	1,873	38.30%	1,144	23.39%	4,890
Otoe	5,799	66.46%	2,927	33.54%	2,872	32.91%	8,726
Pawnee	2,643	62.35%	1,596	37.65%	1,047	24.70%	4,239
Perkins	1,413	57.28%	1,054	42.72%	359	14.55%	2,467
Phelps	2,512	57.63%	1,847	42.37%	665	15.26%	4,359
Pierce	3,271	69.30%	1,449	30.70%	1,822	38.60%	4,720
Platte	4,929	56.07%	3,862	43.93%	1,067	12.14%	8,791
Polk	2,653	61.87%	1,635	38.13%	1,018	23.74%	4,288
Red Willow	3,119	55.70%	2,481	44.30%	638	11.39%	5,600
Richardson	4,833	54.07%	4,105	45.93%	728	8.14%	8,938
Rock	1,104	64.79%	600	35.21%	504	29.58%	1,704
Saline	3,673	46.48%	4,229	53.52%	-556	-7.04%	7,902
Sarpy	2,165	46.04%	2,537	53.96%	-372	-7.91%	4,702
Saunders	4,917	54.16%	4,162	45.84%	755	8.32%	9,079
Scotts Bluff	7,989	64.20%	4,455	35.80%	3,534	28.40%	12,444
Seward	4,117	61.95%	2,529	38.05%	1,588	23.89%	6,646
Sheridan	3,161	66.87%	1,566	33.13%	1,595	33.74%	4,727
Sherman	1,494	44.18%	1,888	55.82%	-394	-11.65%	3,382
Sioux	1,072	63.43%	618	36.57%	454	26.86%	1,690
Stanton	2,074	65.74%	1,081	34.26%	993	31.47%	3,155
Thayer	3,893	65.21%	2,077	34.79%	1,816	30.42%	5,970
Thomas	486	63.70%	277	36.30%	209	27.39%	763
Thurston	1,973	49.18%	2,039	50.82%	-66	-1.65%	4,012
Valley	2,449	60.63%	1,590	39.37%	859	21.27%	4,039
Washington	2,922	52.57%	2,636	47.43%	286	5.15%	5,558
Wayne	3,209	69.70%	1,395	30.30%	1,814	39.40%	4,604
Webster	2,847	68.18%	1,329	31.82%	1,518	36.35%	4,176
Wheeler	495	53.69%	427	46.31%	68	7.38%	922
York	5,322	70.75%	2,200	29.25%	3,122	41.50%	7,522
Totals	352,201	57.19%	263,677	42.81%	88,524	14.37%	615,878

==== Counties that flipped from Democratic to Republican ====
- Boone
- Adams
- Banner
- Blaine
- Box Butte
- Boyd
- Buffalo
- Burt
- Chase
- Cherry
- Cedar
- Cheyenne
- Clay
- Colfax
- Cuming
- Custer
- Dixon
- Dawes
- Dawson
- Deuel
- Dodge
- Dundy
- Fillmore
- Franklin
- Frontier
- Gage
- Gosper
- Grant
- Hall
- Harlan
- Hayes
- Hitchcock
- Holt
- Kearney
- Keith
- Knox
- Kimball
- Lancaster
- Lincoln
- Logan
- Madison
- Merrick
- Nemaha
- Nance
- Nuckolls
- Greeley
- Jefferson
- Johnson
- Morrill
- Pawnee
- Perkins
- Phelps
- Pierce
- Platte
- Polk
- Red Willow
- Richardson
- Saunders
- Scotts Bluff
- Seward
- Sheridan
- Stanton
- Thayer
- Thomas
- Sioux
- Washington
- Wayne
- Webster
- Wheeler

== See also ==
- United States presidential elections in Nebraska
