= Grant County, Nebraska =

County in Nebraska, United States

- County
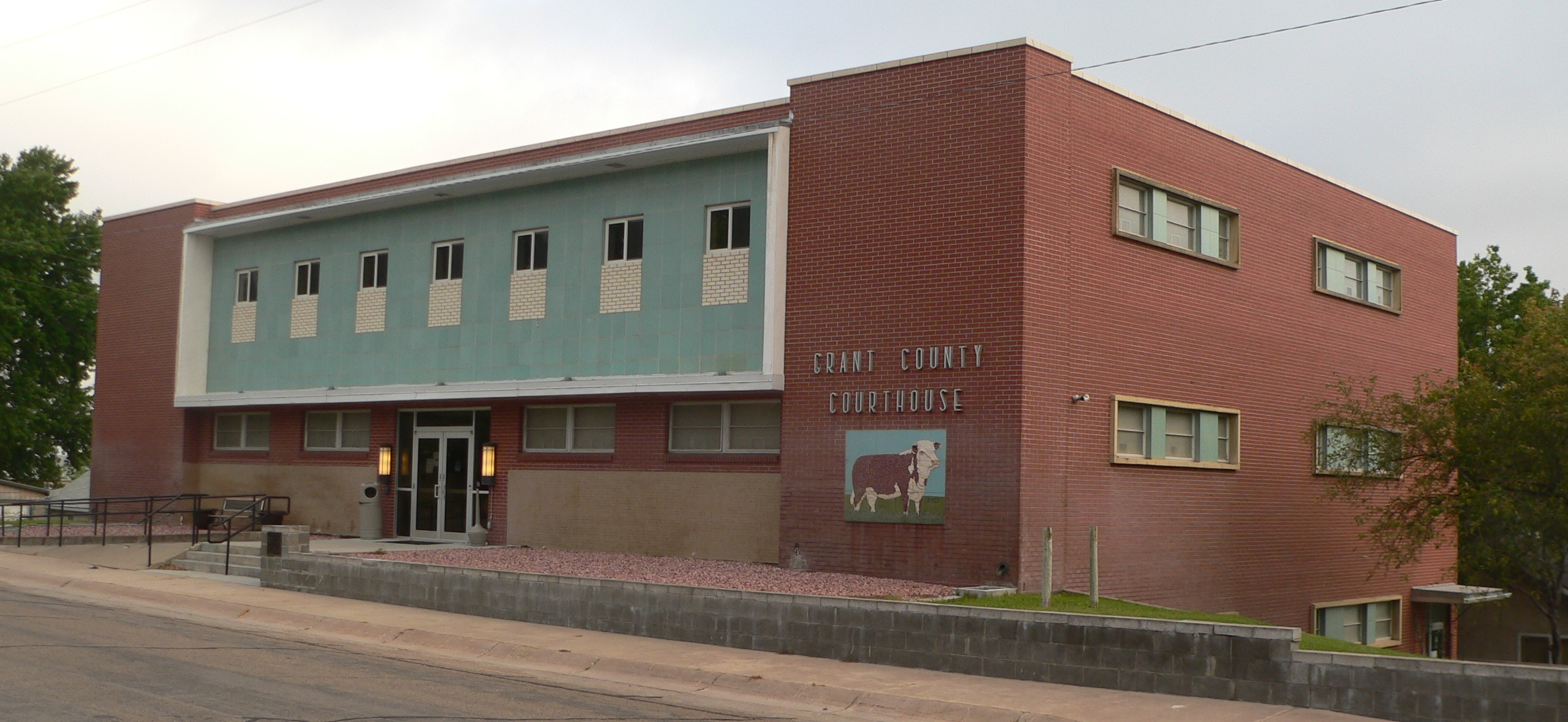
- The Grant County Courthouse in Hyannis

- Location within the U.S. state of Nebraska
- Coordinates: 41.913957°N 101.755965°W
- Country: United States
- State: Nebraska
- Founded: March 31, 1887
- Named for: Ulysses S. Grant
- Seat: Hyannis
- Largest village: Hyannis

Area
  - Total: 783.356 sq mi (2,028.88 km^{2})
  - Land: 776.696 sq mi (2,011.63 km^{2})
  - Water: 6.660 sq mi (17.25 km^{2}) 0.85%

Population (2020)
  - Total: 611
  - Estimate (2025): 561 ▼
  - Density: 0.787/sq mi (0.304/km^{2})
- Time zone: UTC−7 (Mountain)
  - Summer (DST): UTC−6 (MDT)
- Area code: 308
- Congressional district: 3rd
- Website: grantcountyne.gov
- • Nebraska county number 38 • Nebraska license plate prefix 92

Grant County is a county in the U.S. state of Nebraska. As of the 2020 census, the population was 611, and was estimated to be 561 in 2025, making it the fourth-least populous county in Nebraska and the eleventh-least populous county in the United States. The county seat and the largest village is Hyannis.

In the Nebraska license plate system, Grant County was represented by the prefix "92" (as it had the second-smallest number of vehicles registered in the state when the license plate system was established in 1922).

== History ==
Grant County was created on March 31, 1887 and named for Ulysses S. Grant, 18th President of the United States.

== Geography ==
According to the United States Census Bureau, the county has a total area of 783.356 square miles (2,028.88 km^{2}), of which 776.696 square miles (2,011.63 km^{2}) is land and 6.660 square miles (17.25 km^{2}) (0.85%) is water. It is the 27th-largest county in Nebraska by total area.

Grant County is located within the Sandhills, with terrain characterized by continuous waves of east–west oriented rolling hillocks on otherwise flat areas. As a result, the county is dotted with small lakes and reservoirs.

=== Major highways ===
- Nebraska Highway 2
- Nebraska Highway 61

=== Adjacent counties ===
- Cherry County – north
- Hooker County – east
- Arthur County – south
- Garden County – west
- Sheridan County – northwest

== Demographics ==
Historical population
| Census | Pop. | Note | %± |
|---|---|---|---|
| 1890 | 458 | | — |
| 1900 | 763 | | 66.6% |
| 1910 | 1,097 | | 43.8% |
| 1920 | 1,486 | | 35.5% |
| 1930 | 1,427 | | −4.0% |
| 1940 | 1,327 | | −7.0% |
| 1950 | 1,057 | | −20.3% |
| 1960 | 1,009 | | −4.5% |
| 1970 | 1,019 | | 1.0% |
| 1980 | 877 | | −13.9% |
| 1990 | 769 | | −12.3% |
| 2000 | 747 | | −2.9% |
| 2010 | 614 | | −17.8% |
| 2020 | 611 | | −0.5% |
| 2025 (est.) | 561 | ▼ | −8.2% |
U.S. Decennial Census; 1790–1960 1900–1990; 1990–2000 2010–2020

=== 2020 census ===
As of the 2020 census, the county had a population of 611. The median age was 41.0 years. 22.4% of residents were under the age of 18 and 23.1% of residents were 65 years of age or older. For every 100 females there were 112.2 males, and for every 100 females age 18 and over there were 106.1 males age 18 and over.

The racial makeup of the county was 94.9% White, 0.8% Black or African American, 2.0% American Indian and Alaska Native, 0.2% Asian, 0.0% Native Hawaiian and Pacific Islander, 0.2% from some other race, and 2.0% from two or more races. Hispanic or Latino residents of any race comprised 2.0% of the population.

0.0% of residents lived in urban areas, while 100.0% lived in rural areas.

There were 263 households in the county, of which 24.7% had children under the age of 18 living with them and 16.7% had a female householder with no spouse or partner present. About 21.3% of all households were made up of individuals and 11.0% had someone living alone who was 65 years of age or older.

There were 362 housing units, of which 27.3% were vacant. Among occupied housing units, 71.9% were owner-occupied and 28.1% were renter-occupied. The homeowner vacancy rate was 1.0% and the rental vacancy rate was 22.1%.

=== 2000 census ===
As of the 2000 census, there were 747 people, 292 households, and 226 families residing in the county. The population density was 0.95 people per square mile (0.37 people/km^{2}). There were 449 housing units at an average density of 0.57 units per square mile (0.22/km^{2}).

The racial makeup of the county was 98.80% White, 0.13% Native American, 0.27% Asian, 0.80% from other races. 1.34% of the population were Hispanic or Latino of any race.

There were 292 households, out of which 37.00% had children under the age of 18 living with them, 67.50% were married couples living together, 6.50% had a female householder with no husband present, and 22.60% were non-families. 22.30% of all households were made up of individuals, and 8.90% had someone living alone who was 65 years of age or older. The average household size was 2.56 and the average family size was 2.98.

The county population contained 29.20% under the age of 18, 5.20% from 18 to 24, 24.40% from 25 to 44, 27.60% from 45 to 64, and 13.70% who were 65 years of age or older. The median age was 40 years. For every 100 females there were 114.00 males. For every 100 females age 18 and over, there were 105.80 males.

The median income for a household in the county was $34,821, and the median income for a family was $37,011. Males had a median income of $26,319 versus $14,417 for females. The per capita income for the county was $14,815. About 8.20% of families and 9.70% of the population were below the poverty line, including 16.70% of those under age 18 and 0.00% of those age 65 or over.

== Communities ==
=== Village ===
- Hyannis (county seat)

=== Unincorporated communities ===
- Ashby
- Whitman

=== Ghost town ===
- Duluth

== Politics ==
Grant County is strongly Republican, having been Donald Trump's strongest county in 2024. The last time Grant County supported a Democrat was in 1936, when Franklin Delano Roosevelt won in a 46-state landslide over Alf Landon. Barack Obama, in 2008, was the last candidate from the Democratic Party to even get 10 percent of the vote.

United States presidential election results for Grant County, Nebraska
| Year | Republican | | Democratic | | Third party(ies) | |
| Year | No. | % | No. | % | No. | % |
|---|---|---|---|---|---|---|
| 1900 | 148 | 59.20% | 97 | 38.80% | 5 | 2.00% |
| 1904 | 113 | 66.86% | 49 | 28.99% | 7 | 4.14% |
| 1908 | 93 | 47.69% | 101 | 51.79% | 1 | 0.51% |
| 1912 | 82 | 34.75% | 93 | 39.41% | 61 | 25.85% |
| 1916 | 157 | 38.57% | 241 | 59.21% | 9 | 2.21% |
| 1920 | 256 | 64.16% | 141 | 35.34% | 2 | 0.50% |
| 1924 | 260 | 48.69% | 191 | 35.77% | 83 | 15.54% |
| 1928 | 398 | 70.94% | 160 | 28.52% | 3 | 0.53% |
| 1932 | 251 | 37.41% | 395 | 58.87% | 25 | 3.73% |
| 1936 | 267 | 45.25% | 321 | 54.41% | 2 | 0.34% |
| 1940 | 423 | 63.51% | 243 | 36.49% | 0 | 0.00% |
| 1944 | 327 | 65.53% | 172 | 34.47% | 0 | 0.00% |
| 1948 | 273 | 66.26% | 139 | 33.74% | 0 | 0.00% |
| 1952 | 452 | 81.15% | 105 | 18.85% | 0 | 0.00% |
| 1956 | 433 | 83.27% | 87 | 16.73% | 0 | 0.00% |
| 1960 | 410 | 76.35% | 127 | 23.65% | 0 | 0.00% |
| 1964 | 304 | 60.44% | 199 | 39.56% | 0 | 0.00% |
| 1968 | 311 | 74.94% | 84 | 20.24% | 20 | 4.82% |
| 1972 | 376 | 84.49% | 69 | 15.51% | 0 | 0.00% |
| 1976 | 314 | 70.40% | 116 | 26.01% | 16 | 3.59% |
| 1980 | 373 | 80.22% | 76 | 16.34% | 16 | 3.44% |
| 1984 | 406 | 88.45% | 51 | 11.11% | 2 | 0.44% |
| 1988 | 301 | 76.79% | 89 | 22.70% | 2 | 0.51% |
| 1992 | 247 | 55.01% | 75 | 16.70% | 127 | 28.29% |
| 1996 | 258 | 64.82% | 84 | 21.11% | 56 | 14.07% |
| 2000 | 324 | 84.16% | 49 | 12.73% | 12 | 3.12% |
| 2004 | 352 | 88.89% | 41 | 10.35% | 3 | 0.76% |
| 2008 | 318 | 86.65% | 41 | 11.17% | 8 | 2.18% |
| 2012 | 322 | 88.71% | 30 | 8.26% | 11 | 3.03% |
| 2016 | 367 | 90.62% | 20 | 4.94% | 18 | 4.44% |
| 2020 | 375 | 93.28% | 20 | 4.98% | 7 | 1.74% |
| 2024 | 351 | 95.90% | 15 | 4.10% | 0 | 0.00% |

== See also ==
- National Register of Historic Places listings in Grant County, Nebraska
