= Nonpareil, Nebraska =

Unincorporated community in Nebraska, U.S.

Coordinates: 42°22′20″N 103°10′53″W

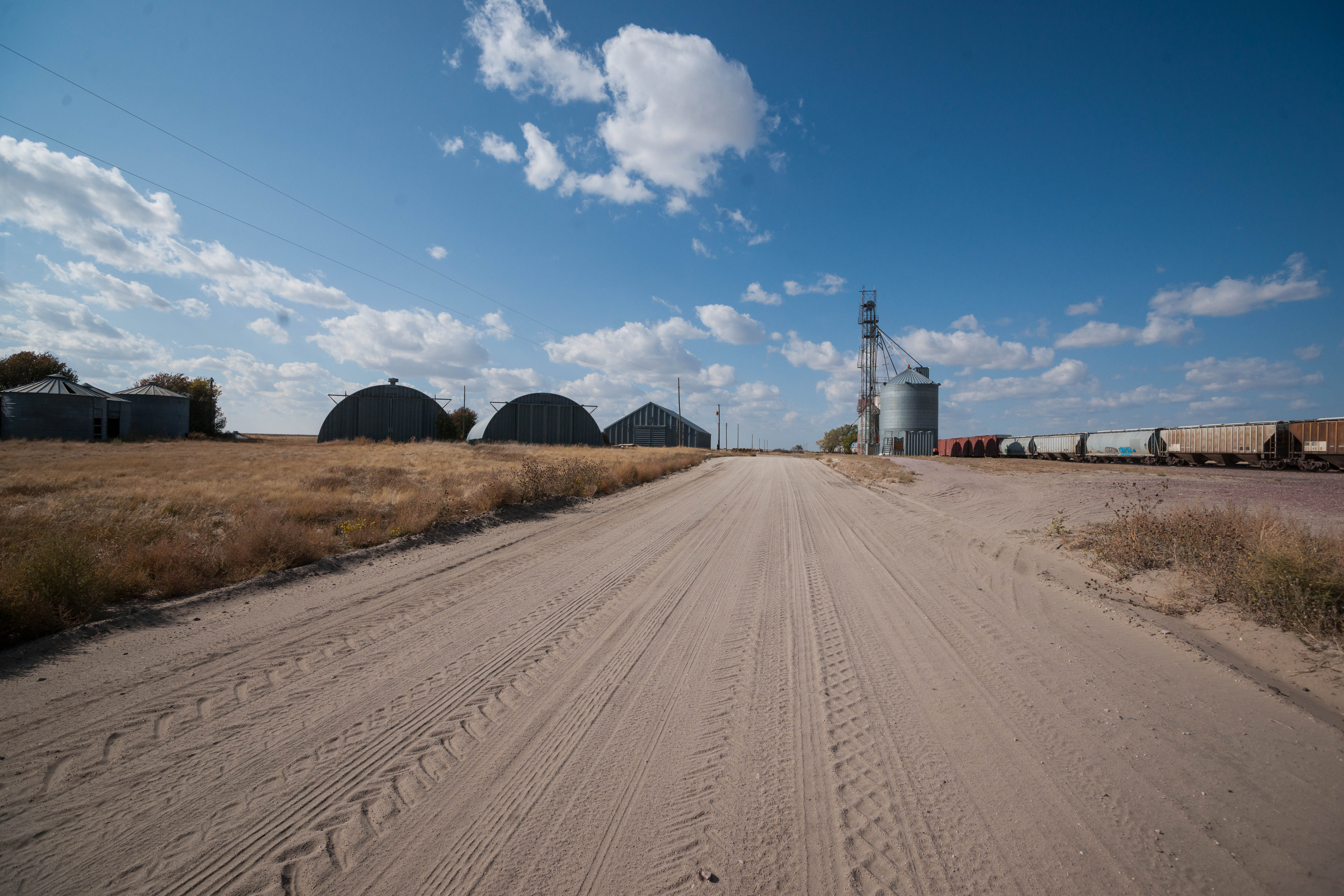
Nonpareil, Nebraska

Nonpareil is an unincorporated community in Box Butte County, Nebraska, United States.

== History ==
A post office was established at Nonpareil in 1886, closed in 1894, reopened in 1925 and reclosed in 1946. Nonpareil was named after the "Nonpareil type" because like the type, the settlement was very small.
