= Duluth University =

Duluth University may mean a university in Duluth, Minnesota

- University of Minnesota Duluth
- Duluth Business University
