= 1992 United States presidential election in Nebraska =

- November 3, 1992
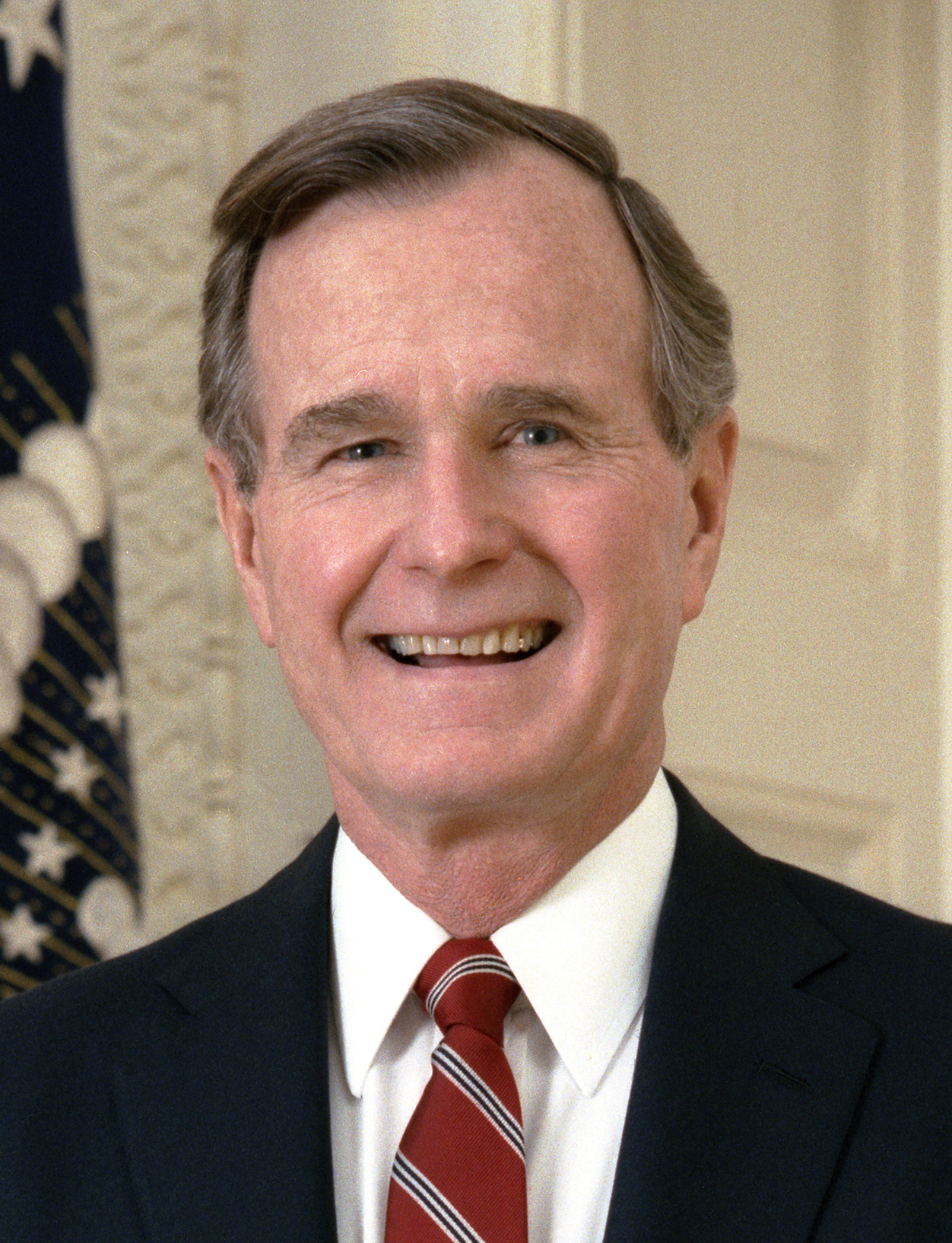

Nominee	George H. W. Bush	Bill Clinton	Ross Perot
Party	Republican	Democratic	Independent
Home state	Texas	Arkansas	Texas
Running mate	Dan Quayle	Al Gore	James Stockdale
Electoral vote	5	0	0
Popular vote	344,346	217,344	174,687
Percentage	46.58%	29.40%	23.63%

Bush
30–40%
40–50%
50–60%
60–70%
Clinton
40–50%
President before election
George H. W. Bush
Republican
Elected President
Bill Clinton
Democratic

The 1992 United States presidential election in Nebraska took place on November 3, 1992, as part of the 1992 United States presidential election. Voters chose five representatives, or electors to the Electoral College, who voted for president and vice president.

Nebraska, a Republican Party stronghold, was won by incumbent President George H. W. Bush (R-Texas) with 46.58% of the popular vote over Governor Bill Clinton (D-Arkansas) with 29.40%. Businessman Ross Perot (I-Texas) finished in third, with 23.63% of the popular vote.

== Background ==
This was the first election in which Nebraska allocated its electoral votes, awarding two votes to the overall winner of the state and one vote to the winner of each congressional district. As Bush won all three districts as well as the statewide popular vote, he was awarded all five electoral votes. It would not be until 2008 that there would be a split in the state's electoral votes, with Barack Obama winning one electoral vote from the 2nd district and John McCain winning the rest.

== Campaign ==
While Bush came in a strong first, the race for second place between Perot and Clinton was much more competitive. In the rural areas of the state, Perot generally ran ahead of Clinton, placing second behind Bush in 68 of Nebraska's 93 counties. In some counties in the western part of the state, Clinton was reduced to third party status, such as in Arthur County, where he polled a measly 7% of the vote to Perot's 37% and Bush's 56%. However, Clinton was able to counter this and poll second statewide by running a strong second in most of the eastern part of the state, including, critically, heavily populated Douglas and Lancaster counties. In these two counties alone, he received 108,499 votes, almost exactly half of his statewide total. Without these two counties, Perot would have beat Clinton for second with 114,039 votes to Clinton's 108,845 (Bush would still be far ahead with 209,244).

With 46.58% of the popular vote, Nebraska would give Bush his fourth-highest vote percentage in the nation after Mississippi, South Carolina and Alabama. Perot came within 5.8% of Clinton's vote share in the state, and exceeded his share in 70 of Nebraska's 93 counties, as well as in the state's heavily conservative 3rd congressional district.

Clinton became the first Democrat to win the presidency without carrying Sherman County since Grover Cleveland 100 years prior.

== Results ==
1992 United States presidential election in Nebraska
Party	Candidate	Votes	Percentage	Electoral votes
Republican	George H. W. Bush (incumbent)	344,346	46.58%	5
Democratic	Bill Clinton	217,344	29.40%	0
Independent	Ross Perot	174,687	23.63%	0
Libertarian	Andre Marrou	1,344	0.18%	0
Independent	Lenora Fulani	848	0.11%	0
Independent	Dr. John Hagelin	714	0.10%	0
Totals		739,283	100.0%	5

=== Congressional districts ===
Bush won all three congressional districts, including one held by a Democrat.

district	Bush	Clinton	Perot	Representative
1st	43.2%	32.6%	24.2%	Doug Bereuter
2nd	47.5%	32.4%	20.1%	Peter Hoagland
3rd	49.7%	23.5%	26.8%	Bill Barrett

=== Results by county ===
County	George H.W. Bush Republican		Bill Clinton Democratic		Ross Perot Independent		Andre Marrou Libertarian		Lenora Fulani Independent		John Hagelin Independent		Margin		Total votes cast
County	#	%	#	%	#	%	#	%	#	%	#	%	#	%	Total votes cast
Adams	6,365	48.36%	3,460	26.29%	3,292	25.01%	22	0.17%	11	0.08%	13	0.10%	2,905	22.07%	13,163
Antelope	1,979	52.41%	650	17.21%	1,134	30.03%	6	0.16%	3	0.08%	4	0.11%	845 (Note: In this county where Perot ran second ahead of Clinton, margin given is Bush vote minus Perot vote and percentage margin Bush percentage minus Perot percentage.)	22.38%	3,776
Arthur	148	56.06%	18	6.82%	98	37.12%	0	0.00%	0	0.00%	0	0.00%	50	18.94%	264
Banner	284	59.17%	68	14.17%	128	26.67%	0	0.00%	0	0.00%	0	0.00%	156	32.50%	480
Blaine	256	56.51%	64	14.13%	130	28.70%	2	0.44%	1	0.22%	0	0.00%	126	27.81%	453
Boone	1,589	50.21%	604	19.08%	958	30.27%	4	0.13%	3	0.09%	7	0.22%	631	19.94%	3,165
Box Butte	2,203	38.74%	1,942	34.15%	1,513	26.60%	10	0.18%	12	0.21%	7	0.12%	261	4.59%	5,687
Boyd	744	47.36%	353	22.47%	468	29.79%	2	0.13%	1	0.06%	3	0.19%	276	17.57%	1,571
Brown	999	54.12%	311	16.85%	525	28.44%	5	0.27%	4	0.22%	2	0.11%	474	25.68%	1,846
Buffalo	9,726	55.11%	3,747	21.23%	4,092	23.19%	43	0.24%	25	0.14%	16	0.09%	5,634	31.92%	17,649
Burt	1,667	42.61%	1,224	31.29%	1,009	25.79%	8	0.20%	2	0.05%	2	0.05%	443	11.32%	3,912
Butler	1,884	45.35%	1,089	26.22%	1,159	27.90%	4	0.10%	8	0.19%	10	0.24%	725	17.45%	4,154
Cass	4,314	43.23%	2,949	29.55%	2,657	26.63%	28	0.28%	11	0.11%	20	0.20%	1,365	13.68%	9,979
Cedar	1,981	43.85%	1,007	22.29%	1,507	33.36%	8	0.18%	1	0.02%	14	0.31%	474	10.49%	4,518
Chase	1,000	48.01%	398	19.11%	675	32.41%	6	0.29%	3	0.14%	1	0.05%	325	15.60%	2,083
Cherry	1,707	56.75%	563	18.72%	730	24.27%	1	0.03%	2	0.07%	5	0.17%	977	32.48%	3,008
Cheyenne	2,197	51.80%	967	22.80%	1,061	25.02%	12	0.28%	1	0.02%	3	0.07%	1,136	26.78%	4,241
Clay	1,824	50.84%	802	22.35%	953	26.56%	5	0.14%	1	0.03%	3	0.08%	871	24.28%	3,588
Colfax	1,915	46.21%	1,011	24.40%	1,197	28.89%	6	0.14%	6	0.14%	9	0.22%	718	17.32%	4,144
Cuming	2,713	57.10%	836	17.60%	1,194	25.13%	5	0.11%	1	0.02%	2	0.04%	1,519	31.97%	4,751
Custer	3,180	54.64%	1,126	19.35%	1,492	25.64%	15	0.26%	2	0.03%	5	0.09%	1,688	29.00%	5,820
Dakota	2,793	43.21%	2,335	36.12%	1,321	20.44%	9	0.14%	2	0.03%	4	0.06%	458	7.09%	6,464
Dawes	1,961	48.21%	987	24.26%	1,103	27.11%	9	0.22%	5	0.12%	3	0.07%	858	21.10%	4,068
Dawson	4,714	53.64%	1,741	19.81%	2,307	26.25%	12	0.14%	5	0.06%	10	0.11%	2,407	27.39%	8,789
Deuel	558	49.82%	232	20.71%	327	29.20%	2	0.18%	1	0.09%	0	0.00%	231	20.62%	1,120
Dixon	1,484	48.59%	830	27.18%	726	23.77%	9	0.29%	3	0.10%	2	0.07%	654	21.41%	3,054
Dodge	7,271	44.30%	4,667	28.44%	4,432	27.00%	20	0.12%	12	0.07%	10	0.06%	2,604	15.86%	16,412
Douglas	93,512	46.73%	67,097	33.53%	38,697	19.34%	416	0.21%	235	0.12%	164	0.08%	26,415	13.20%	200,121
Dundy	664	52.99%	245	19.55%	332	26.50%	8	0.64%	2	0.16%	2	0.16%	332	26.49%	1,253
Fillmore	1,501	42.93%	990	28.32%	998	28.55%	2	0.06%	2	0.06%	3	0.09%	503	14.38%	3,496
Franklin	969	48.87%	477	24.05%	528	26.63%	3	0.15%	3	0.15%	3	0.15%	441	22.24%	1,983
Frontier	785	49.97%	302	19.22%	479	30.49%	1	0.06%	3	0.19%	1	0.06%	306	19.48%	1,571
Furnas	1,365	48.73%	624	22.28%	804	28.70%	8	0.29%	0	0.00%	0	0.00%	561	20.03%	2,801
Gage	4,006	39.65%	3,315	32.81%	2,740	27.12%	16	0.16%	17	0.17%	10	0.10%	691	6.84%	10,104
Garden	697	53.49%	212	16.27%	385	29.55%	6	0.46%	2	0.15%	1	0.08%	312	23.94%	1,303
Garfield	595	54.74%	221	20.33%	270	24.84%	1	0.09%	0	0.00%	0	0.00%	325	29.90%	1,087
Gosper	492	46.95%	254	24.24%	297	28.34%	1	0.10%	2	0.19%	2	0.19%	195	18.61%	1,048
Grant	247	55.01%	75	16.70%	124	27.62%	1	0.22%	2	0.45%	0	0.00%	123	27.39%	449
Greeley	588	41.44%	435	30.66%	395	27.84%	1	0.07%	0	0.00%	0	0.00%	153	10.78%	1,419
Hall	9,341	44.67%	5,558	26.58%	5,926	28.34%	42	0.20%	32	0.15%	14	0.07%	3,415	16.33%	20,913
Hamilton	2,388	51.72%	994	21.53%	1,220	26.42%	5	0.11%	7	0.15%	3	0.06%	1,168	25.30%	4,617
Harlan	992	46.88%	488	23.06%	626	29.58%	3	0.14%	3	0.14%	4	0.19%	366	17.30%	2,116
Hayes	362	55.35%	85	13.00%	207	31.65%	0	0.00%	0	0.00%	0	0.00%	155	23.70%	654
Hitchcock	824	47.60%	359	20.74%	540	31.20%	4	0.23%	2	0.12%	2	0.12%	284	16.40%	1,731
Holt	3,131	54.90%	835	14.64%	1,714	30.05%	6	0.11%	9	0.16%	8	0.14%	1,417	24.85%	5,703
Hooker	283	62.20%	70	15.38%	102	22.42%	0	0.00%	0	0.00%	0	0.00%	181	39.78%	455
Howard	1,138	39.65%	778	27.11%	942	32.82%	4	0.14%	4	0.14%	4	0.14%	196	6.83%	2,870
Jefferson	1,783	39.70%	1,506	33.53%	1,177	26.21%	7	0.16%	9	0.20%	9	0.20%	277	6.17%	4,491
Johnson	885	37.50%	822	34.83%	642	27.20%	1	0.04%	6	0.25%	4	0.17%	63	2.67%	2,360
Kearney	1,756	53.72%	645	19.73%	853	26.09%	7	0.21%	5	0.15%	3	0.09%	903	27.63%	3,269
Keith	2,050	51.65%	740	18.64%	1,162	29.28%	9	0.23%	4	0.10%	4	0.10%	888	22.37%	3,969
Keya Paha	368	58.32%	105	16.64%	158	25.04%	0	0.00%	0	0.00%	0	0.00%	210	33.28%	631
Kimball	931	52.04%	408	22.81%	441	24.65%	3	0.17%	6	0.34%	0	0.00%	490	27.39%	1,789
Knox	2,113	49.55%	968	22.70%	1,166	27.35%	9	0.21%	3	0.07%	5	0.12%	947	22.20%	4,264
Lancaster	41,590	39.46%	41,402	39.28%	21,951	20.83%	204	0.19%	161	0.15%	91	0.09%	188	0.18%	105,399
Lincoln	7,054	45.04%	5,158	32.94%	3,406	21.75%	13	0.08%	18	0.11%	12	0.08%	1,896	12.10%	15,661
Logan	271	60.09%	80	17.74%	98	21.73%	1	0.22%	1	0.22%	0	0.00%	173	38.36%	451
Loup	234	59.69%	59	15.05%	97	24.74%	1	0.26%	1	0.26%	0	0.00%	137	34.95%	392
Madison	7,877	57.10%	2,364	17.14%	3,508	25.43%	22	0.16%	11	0.08%	14	0.10%	4,369	31.67%	13,796
McPherson	217	65.96%	49	14.89%	62	18.84%	1	0.30%	0	0.00%	0	0.00%	155	47.12%	329
Merrick	1,854	48.65%	864	22.67%	1,072	28.13%	3	0.08%	6	0.16%	12	0.31%	782	20.52%	3,811
Morrill	1,185	46.89%	577	22.83%	753	29.80%	6	0.24%	5	0.20%	1	0.04%	432	17.09%	2,527
Nance	851	42.83%	559	28.13%	569	28.64%	3	0.15%	1	0.05%	4	0.20%	282	14.19%	1,987
Nemaha	1,696	44.01%	1,110	28.80%	1,020	26.47%	13	0.34%	7	0.18%	8	0.21%	586	15.21%	3,854
Nuckolls	1,277	43.16%	834	28.19%	828	27.98%	9	0.30%	3	0.10%	8	0.27%	443	14.97%	2,959
Otoe	2,960	43.29%	2,038	29.80%	1,800	26.32%	21	0.31%	11	0.16%	8	0.12%	922	13.49%	6,838
Pawnee	670	37.06%	566	31.31%	565	31.25%	4	0.22%	1	0.06%	2	0.11%	104	5.75%	1,808
Perkins	842	50.54%	300	18.01%	522	31.33%	2	0.12%	0	0.00%	0	0.00%	320	19.21%	1,666
Phelps	2,752	56.13%	830	16.93%	1,302	26.56%	13	0.27%	3	0.06%	3	0.06%	1,450	29.57%	4,903
Pierce	1,853	52.02%	611	17.15%	1,084	30.43%	3	0.08%	3	0.08%	8	0.22%	769	21.59%	3,562
Platte	7,736	55.76%	2,421	17.45%	3,671	26.46%	24	0.17%	12	0.09%	10	0.07%	4,065	29.30%	13,874
Polk	1,437	49.25%	661	22.65%	812	27.83%	4	0.14%	1	0.03%	3	0.10%	625	21.42%	2,918
Red Willow	2,500	46.80%	1,166	21.83%	1,665	31.17%	6	0.11%	3	0.06%	2	0.04%	835	15.63%	5,342
Richardson	2,050	41.47%	1,513	30.61%	1,359	27.49%	3	0.06%	8	0.16%	10	0.20%	537	10.86%	4,943
Rock	588	59.57%	162	16.41%	233	23.61%	1	0.10%	1	0.10%	2	0.20%	355	35.96%	987
Saline	1,740	30.18%	2,425	42.06%	1,576	27.34%	7	0.12%	11	0.19%	6	0.10%	-685	-11.88%	5,765
Sarpy	20,516	50.44%	10,741	26.41%	9,284	22.83%	70	0.17%	43	0.11%	19	0.05%	9,775	24.03%	40,673
Saunders	4,037	44.11%	2,509	27.41%	2,567	28.05%	19	0.21%	8	0.09%	12	0.13%	1,470	16.06%	9,152
Scotts Bluff	7,213	48.24%	4,175	27.92%	3,516	23.52%	20	0.13%	15	0.10%	12	0.08%	3,038	20.32%	14,951
Seward	3,060	44.12%	2,121	30.58%	1,731	24.96%	9	0.13%	10	0.14%	5	0.07%	939	13.54%	6,936
Sheridan	1,698	56.68%	535	17.86%	751	25.07%	8	0.27%	4	0.13%	0	0.00%	947	31.61%	2,996
Sherman	736	38.74%	568	29.89%	583	30.68%	7	0.37%	1	0.05%	5	0.26%	153	8.06%	1,900
Sioux	445	55.49%	148	18.45%	206	25.69%	1	0.12%	2	0.25%	0	0.00%	239	29.80%	802
Stanton	1,274	49.71%	496	19.35%	786	30.67%	4	0.16%	3	0.12%	0	0.00%	488	19.04%	2,563
Thayer	1,391	40.79%	924	27.10%	1,079	31.64%	5	0.15%	3	0.09%	8	0.23%	312	9.15%	3,410
Thomas	283	60.34%	70	14.93%	115	24.52%	1	0.21%	0	0.00%	0	0.00%	168	35.82%	469
Thurston	898	39.79%	865	38.33%	487	21.58%	2	0.09%	1	0.04%	4	0.18%	33	1.46%	2,257
Valley	1,173	45.29%	716	27.64%	693	26.76%	3	0.12%	5	0.19%	0	0.00%	457	17.65%	2,590
Washington	4,042	48.47%	2,116	25.37%	2,166	25.97%	10	0.12%	3	0.04%	3	0.04%	1,876	22.50%	8,340
Wayne	2,122	51.73%	921	22.45%	1,047	25.52%	7	0.17%	3	0.07%	2	0.05%	1,075	26.21%	4,102
Webster	973	42.98%	625	27.61%	657	29.02%	3	0.13%	4	0.18%	2	0.09%	316	13.96%	2,264
Wheeler	246	53.02%	88	18.97%	127	27.37%	1	0.22%	1	0.22%	1	0.22%	119	25.65%	464
York	3,783	53.94%	1,385	19.75%	1,826	26.04%	3	0.04%	7	0.10%	9	0.13%	1,957	27.90%	7,013
Totals	344,346	46.58%	217,344	29.40%	174,687	23.63%	1,344	0.18%	848	0.11%	714	0.10%	127,002	17.18%	739,283

==== Counties that flipped from Democratic to Republican ====
- Dakota
- Thurston

== See also ==
- United States presidential elections in Nebraska
- Presidency of Bill Clinton

== Works cited ==
- Abramson, Paul; Aldrich, John; Rohde, David (1995). Change and Continuity in the 1992 Elections. CQ Press. ISBN 0871878399.
