= Duluth, Nebraska =

Unincorporated community in Nebraska, United States

- Ghost Town
- Location within Nebraska Location within the United States
- Coordinates: 42°N 101.6°W
- Country: United States
- State: Nebraska
- County: Grant

Duluth is a former town of Grant County, Nebraska, United States, farm land now devoid of any buildings and existing only as a railroad locator-marker.

== History ==
Duluth was a flag stop on the railroad. It was likely named after Duluth, Minnesota.
