= 1936 United States presidential election in Nebraska =

- November 3, 1936

All 7 Nebraska votes to the Electoral College

Nominee	Franklin D. Roosevelt	Alf Landon
Party	Democratic	Republican
Home state	New York	Kansas
Running mate	John Nance Garner	Frank Knox
Electoral vote	7	0
Popular vote	347,445	247,731
Percentage	57.14%	40.74%
County results
Roosevelt
40–50%
50–60%
60–70%
70–80%
Landon
40–50%
50–60%
President before election
Franklin D. Roosevelt
Democratic
Elected President
Franklin D. Roosevelt
Democratic

The 1936 United States presidential election in Nebraska took place on November 3, 1936, as part of the 1936 United States presidential election. Voters chose seven representatives, or electors, to the Electoral College, who voted for president and vice president.

Nebraska was won by the incumbent Democratic President, Franklin Roosevelt from New York, running with Vice President John Nance Garner, with 57.14% of the popular vote, against the Republican nominee, Governor of Kansas Alf Landon, running with Frank Knox, with 40.74% of the popular vote. Roosevelt won the state by a margin of 16.4%, a significantly reduced margin from his 27.7% victory over Herbert Hoover just 4 years earlier in 1932, thus making Nebraska one of the sole states to trend Republican in 1936, an election that would otherwise represent a sea of blue, with Roosevelt winning one of the largest landslides in American history and the largest ever for a Democrat. With its 7 electoral votes, Nebraska would weigh in as 7.9% more Republican than the rest of the nation.

Key to Roosevelt's victory were his margins in the rural counties, where he ran up massive margins among farmers, as his New Deal programs were popular among voters who believed they were responsible for easing The Great Depression. Additionally, Nebraska had been hard hit by the Dust Bowl, a period of severe dust storms and droughts that greatly damaged the agriculture economy in the state. Indeed, Roosevelt's margins in these counties have been unmatched by any Democrat presidential nominee since.

However, even with his sizable victory, cracks in Roosevelt's favorability in rural communities were evident, as Nebraska trended to the right by 11.3%, an unusually large shift given the heavily Democratic national environment, with Roosevelt increasing his victory margin and Democrats expanding their supermajorities in Congress.

As of the 2024 presidential election, this is the last time in which Nebraska's 3rd congressional district selected the Democratic nominee for president. This is also the last occasion when the following counties have voted for a Democratic presidential candidate: Banner, Blaine, Box Butte, Boyd, Burt, Chase, Cherry, Cheyenne, Cuming, Custer, Dawes, Dawson, Deuel, Dodge, Dundy, Frontier, Gosper, Grant, Harlan, Hayes, Hitchcock, Holt, Keith, Kimball, Knox, Madison, Merrick, Morrill, Pawnee, Perkins, Phelps, Pierce, Red Willow, Scotts Bluff, Sheridan, Sioux, Stanton, Thomas and Wayne.

== Results ==
1936 United States presidential election in Nebraska
Party	Candidate	Votes	%
Democratic	Franklin D. Roosevelt (inc.)	347,445	57.14%
Republican	Alf Landon	247,731	40.74%
Union	William Lemke	12,847	2.11%
Total votes		608,023	100%

=== Results by county ===
County	Franklin Delano Roosevelt Democratic		Alfred Mossman Landon Republican		William Frederick Lemke Union		Margin		Total votes cast
County	#	%	#	%	#	%	#	%	Total votes cast
Adams	6,126	57.68%	4,094	38.55%	401	3.78%	2,032	19.13%	10,621
Antelope	3,165	47.44%	3,304	49.52%	203	3.04%	-139	-2.08%	6,672
Arthur	235	42.73%	312	56.73%	3	0.55%	-77	-14.00%	550
Banner	367	56.46%	277	42.62%	6	0.92%	90	13.85%	650
Blaine	365	50.98%	342	47.77%	9	1.26%	23	3.21%	716
Boone	3,095	51.37%	2,728	45.28%	202	3.35%	367	6.09%	6,025
Box Butte	2,900	62.19%	1,711	36.69%	52	1.12%	1,189	25.50%	4,663
Boyd	1,555	53.62%	1,290	44.48%	55	1.90%	265	9.14%	2,900
Brown	1,188	45.03%	1,419	53.79%	31	1.18%	-231	-8.76%	2,638
Buffalo	6,002	54.70%	4,595	41.88%	375	3.42%	1,407	12.82%	10,972
Burt	3,120	52.87%	2,710	45.92%	71	1.20%	410	6.95%	5,901
Butler	4,360	62.95%	2,442	35.26%	124	1.79%	1,918	27.69%	6,926
Cass	4,922	56.93%	3,669	42.44%	54	0.62%	1,253	14.49%	8,645
Cedar	3,781	55.66%	2,394	35.24%	618	9.10%	1,387	20.42%	6,793
Chase	1,493	57.71%	1,031	39.85%	63	2.44%	462	17.86%	2,587
Cherry	2,010	51.03%	1,874	47.58%	55	1.40%	136	3.45%	3,939
Cheyenne	2,950	66.41%	1,374	30.93%	118	2.66%	1,576	35.48%	4,442
Clay	2,932	49.54%	2,856	48.26%	130	2.20%	76	1.28%	5,918
Colfax	3,210	63.25%	1,644	32.39%	221	4.35%	1,566	30.86%	5,075
Cuming	3,114	53.32%	2,275	38.96%	451	7.72%	839	14.37%	5,840
Custer	5,907	51.39%	5,250	45.67%	338	2.94%	657	5.72%	11,495
Dakota	2,741	64.01%	1,264	29.52%	277	6.47%	1,477	34.49%	4,282
Dawes	2,784	54.35%	2,083	40.67%	255	4.98%	701	13.69%	5,122
Dawson	4,021	52.21%	3,573	46.39%	108	1.40%	448	5.82%	7,702
Deuel	1,020	56.42%	747	41.32%	41	2.27%	273	15.10%	1,808
Dixon	2,640	54.21%	2,108	43.29%	122	2.51%	532	10.92%	4,870
Dodge	6,317	55.71%	4,561	40.22%	461	4.07%	1,756	15.49%	11,339
Douglas	70,245	65.60%	35,349	33.01%	1,482	1.38%	34,896	32.59%	107,076
Dundy	1,328	55.15%	1,054	43.77%	26	1.08%	274	11.38%	2,408
Fillmore	3,154	52.03%	2,858	47.15%	50	0.82%	296	4.88%	6,062
Franklin	2,350	56.42%	1,685	40.46%	130	3.12%	665	15.97%	4,165
Frontier	1,883	53.66%	1,576	44.91%	50	1.42%	307	8.75%	3,509
Furnas	2,482	45.76%	2,842	52.40%	100	1.84%	-360	-6.64%	5,424
Gage	7,227	56.70%	5,291	41.51%	227	1.78%	1,936	15.19%	12,745
Garden	986	49.13%	996	49.63%	25	1.25%	-10	-0.50%	2,007
Garfield	697	47.22%	744	50.41%	35	2.37%	-47	-3.18%	1,476
Gosper	1,118	62.70%	647	36.29%	18	1.01%	471	26.42%	1,783
Grant	321	54.41%	267	45.25%	2	0.34%	54	9.15%	590
Greeley	1,988	56.40%	1,107	31.40%	430	12.20%	881	24.99%	3,525
Hall	6,295	53.30%	5,146	43.57%	369	3.12%	1,149	9.73%	11,810
Hamilton	2,653	48.69%	2,748	50.43%	48	0.88%	-95	-1.74%	5,449
Harlan	2,084	54.64%	1,692	44.36%	38	1.00%	392	10.28%	3,814
Hayes	818	55.20%	654	44.13%	10	0.67%	164	11.07%	1,482
Hitchcock	1,738	57.08%	1,285	42.20%	22	0.72%	453	14.88%	3,045
Holt	3,902	50.26%	3,714	47.84%	148	1.91%	188	2.42%	7,764
Hooker	191	39.63%	288	59.75%	3	0.62%	-97	-20.12%	482
Howard	3,148	70.05%	1,223	27.21%	123	2.74%	1,925	42.83%	4,494
Jefferson	4,526	59.37%	3,048	39.98%	50	0.66%	1,478	19.39%	7,624
Johnson	2,359	52.13%	2,126	46.98%	40	0.88%	233	5.15%	4,525
Kearney	2,445	65.89%	1,214	32.71%	52	1.40%	1,231	33.17%	3,711
Keith	2,000	63.45%	1,094	34.71%	58	1.84%	906	28.74%	3,152
Keya Paha	556	39.91%	830	59.58%	7	0.50%	-274	-19.67%	1,393
Kimball	1,137	55.95%	842	41.44%	53	2.61%	295	14.52%	2,032
Knox	4,449	58.67%	2,949	38.89%	185	2.44%	1,500	19.78%	7,583
Lancaster	22,366	50.71%	20,902	47.39%	838	1.90%	1,464	3.32%	44,106
Lincoln	6,742	62.45%	3,857	35.73%	197	1.82%	2,885	26.72%	10,796
Logan	456	52.17%	410	46.91%	8	0.92%	46	5.26%	874
Loup	335	42.57%	438	55.65%	14	1.78%	-103	-13.09%	787
Madison	6,044	53.30%	5,149	45.41%	147	1.30%	895	7.89%	11,340
McPherson	250	42.81%	326	55.82%	8	1.37%	-76	-13.01%	584
Merrick	2,401	49.13%	2,367	48.43%	119	2.44%	34	0.70%	4,887
Morrill	1,999	58.73%	1,354	39.78%	51	1.50%	645	18.95%	3,404
Nance	2,012	52.52%	1,770	46.20%	49	1.28%	242	6.32%	3,831
Nemaha	3,459	55.77%	2,720	43.86%	23	0.37%	739	11.92%	6,202
Nuckolls	2,778	53.72%	2,317	44.81%	76	1.47%	461	8.92%	5,171
Otoe	4,173	48.33%	4,399	50.95%	62	0.72%	-226	-2.62%	8,634
Pawnee	2,297	52.16%	2,074	47.09%	33	0.75%	223	5.06%	4,404
Perkins	1,584	64.39%	861	35.00%	15	0.61%	723	29.39%	2,460
Phelps	2,587	57.62%	1,884	41.96%	19	0.42%	703	15.66%	4,490
Pierce	2,357	52.44%	2,016	44.85%	122	2.71%	341	7.59%	4,495
Platte	6,249	65.70%	2,850	29.96%	413	4.34%	3,399	35.73%	9,512
Polk	2,519	52.23%	2,256	46.78%	48	1.00%	263	5.45%	4,823
Red Willow	3,445	60.52%	2,078	36.51%	169	2.97%	1,367	24.02%	5,692
Richardson	5,813	59.57%	3,908	40.05%	37	0.38%	1,905	19.52%	9,758
Rock	710	42.46%	944	56.46%	18	1.08%	-234	-14.00%	1,672
Saline	5,480	66.78%	2,637	32.14%	89	1.08%	2,843	34.65%	8,206
Sarpy	3,030	65.18%	1,569	33.75%	50	1.08%	1,461	31.43%	4,649
Saunders	5,514	57.52%	3,773	39.36%	300	3.13%	1,741	18.16%	9,587
Scotts Bluff	5,768	57.70%	4,051	40.53%	177	1.77%	1,717	17.18%	9,996
Seward	3,866	54.92%	3,123	44.37%	50	0.71%	743	10.56%	7,039
Sheridan	2,428	54.14%	1,907	42.52%	150	3.34%	521	11.62%	4,485
Sherman	2,701	66.81%	1,294	32.01%	48	1.19%	1,407	34.80%	4,043
Sioux	956	57.66%	674	40.65%	28	1.69%	282	17.01%	1,658
Stanton	1,917	59.94%	1,169	36.55%	112	3.50%	748	23.39%	3,198
Thayer	3,418	55.80%	2,628	42.91%	79	1.29%	790	12.90%	6,125
Thomas	374	49.67%	366	48.61%	13	1.73%	8	1.06%	753
Thurston	2,676	65.88%	1,195	29.42%	191	4.70%	1,481	36.46%	4,062
Valley	1,960	47.86%	2,033	49.65%	102	2.49%	-73	-1.78%	4,095
Washington	3,426	59.75%	2,263	39.47%	45	0.78%	1,163	20.28%	5,734
Wayne	2,322	51.07%	2,149	47.26%	76	1.67%	173	3.80%	4,547
Webster	2,408	55.13%	1,912	43.77%	48	1.10%	496	11.36%	4,368
Wheeler	484	52.61%	358	38.91%	78	8.48%	126	13.70%	920
York	3,741	44.46%	4,554	54.12%	120	1.43%	-813	-9.66%	8,415
Totals	347,445	57.14%	247,731	40.74%	12,847	2.11%	99,714	16.40%	!608,023

==== Counties that flipped from Democratic to Republican ====
- Antelope
- Arthur
- Brown
- Furnas
- Garden
- Garfield
- Hamilton
- Hooker
- Loup
- McPherson
- Otoe
- Rock
- Valley
- York

==== Counties that flipped from Republican to Democratic ====
- Lancaster

== See also ==
- United States presidential elections in Nebraska
