= 1984 United States presidential election in Nebraska =

- November 6, 1984

Nominee	Ronald Reagan	Walter Mondale
Party	Republican	Democratic
Home state	California	Minnesota
Running mate	George H. W. Bush	Geraldine Ferraro
Electoral vote	5	0
Popular vote	460,054	187,866
Percentage	70.55%	28.81%
County results
Reagan
50–60%
60–70%
70–80%
80–90%
President before election
Ronald Reagan
Republican
Elected President
Ronald Reagan
Republican

The 1984 United States presidential election in Nebraska took place on November 6, 1984. All 50 states and the District of Columbia, were part of the 1984 United States presidential election. Voters chose five electors to the Electoral College, which selected the president and vice president of the United States.

Nebraska was won by incumbent United States President Ronald Reagan of California, who was running against former Vice President Walter Mondale of Minnesota. Reagan ran for a second time with former C.I.A. Director George H. W. Bush of Texas, and Mondale ran with Representative Geraldine Ferraro of New York, the first major female candidate for the vice presidency.

The presidential election of 1984 was a very partisan election for Nebraska, with over 99% of the electorate voting for either the Democratic or Republican parties, and only five parties formally appearing on the ballot. Reagan won a majority in all of Nebraska's counties, joining previous Republican nominees Theodore Roosevelt in 1904, Warren Harding in 1920, Dwight Eisenhower in 1952, Richard Nixon in 1972, and himself in 1980.

Nebraska weighed in for this election as 12% more Republican than the national average and with 70.55% of the popular vote, proved to be Reagan's third strongest state in the 1984 election after Utah and Idaho. Reagan won Nebraska by a powerful 42% margin. His 70.55% vote share in the state made it his third-best in the country, after Utah and Idaho. Nebraska continued its trend of voting in line with its sister free-soil and postbellum Great Plains states (North Dakota, South Dakota, and Kansas); the four last disagreed in a presidential election in 1916.

Reagan did well in population centers and rural areas alike, scoring almost two-thirds of the vote in the state's largest county, Douglas (home to Omaha), and getting over three-quarters of the vote in a majority of Nebraska's counties (58 of 93). Mondale's best county was Saline, at the time the strongest traditional stronghold for the Democratic Party in the state; the county had voted Democratic in every election from 1908 through 1976 save 1920, 1952, and 1972. Even here, however, Mondale failed to keep Reagan's margin to single digits.

== Results ==
1984 United States presidential election in Nebraska
Party	Candidate	Votes	Percentage	Electoral votes
Republican	Ronald Reagan (incumbent)	460,054	70.55%	5
Democratic	Walter Mondale	187,866	28.81%	0
Libertarian	David Bergland	2,079	0.32%	0
Independent	Melvin Mason	1,066	0.16%	0
Independent	Dennis Serrette	1,025	0.16%	0
Totals		652,090	100.0%	5

=== Results by county ===
County	Ronald Reagan Republican		Walter Mondale Democratic		David Bergland Libertarian		Melvin Mason Independent		Dennis Serrette Independent		Margin		Total votes cast
County	#	%	#	%	#	%	#	%	#	%	#	%	Total votes cast
Adams	9,127	75.09%	2,945	24.23%	48	0.39%	21	0.17%	14	0.12%	6,182	50.86%	12,155
Antelope	3,222	81.80%	697	17.69%	12	0.30%	4	0.10%	4	0.10%	2,525	64.11%	3,939
Arthur	248	88.26%	33	11.74%	0	0.00%	0	0.00%	0	0.00%	215	76.52%	281
Banner	457	87.55%	58	11.11%	5	0.96%	2	0.38%	0	0.00%	399	76.44%	522
Blaine	363	88.32%	48	11.68%	0	0.00%	0	0.00%	0	0.00%	315	76.64%	411
Boone	2,508	78.01%	690	21.46%	6	0.19%	8	0.25%	3	0.09%	1,818	56.55%	3,215
Box Butte	4,011	72.60%	1,471	26.62%	22	0.40%	7	0.13%	14	0.25%	2,540	45.98%	5,525
Boyd	1,175	78.54%	308	20.59%	10	0.67%	2	0.13%	1	0.07%	867	57.95%	1,496
Brown	1,514	82.60%	312	17.02%	2	0.11%	1	0.05%	4	0.22%	1,202	65.58%	1,833
Buffalo	11,365	78.11%	3,086	21.21%	51	0.35%	21	0.14%	27	0.19%	8,279	56.90%	14,550
Burt	2,645	71.08%	1,054	28.33%	9	0.24%	9	0.24%	4	0.11%	1,591	42.75%	3,721
Butler	2,557	67.56%	1,193	31.52%	22	0.58%	5	0.13%	8	0.21%	1,364	36.04%	3,785
Cass	5,461	68.04%	2,499	31.14%	26	0.32%	22	0.27%	18	0.22%	2,962	36.90%	8,026
Cedar	3,298	72.71%	1,201	26.48%	21	0.46%	11	0.24%	5	0.11%	2,097	46.23%	4,536
Chase	1,697	80.93%	368	17.55%	21	1.00%	3	0.14%	8	0.38%	1,329	63.38%	2,097
Cherry	2,720	85.05%	463	14.48%	10	0.31%	2	0.06%	3	0.09%	2,257	70.57%	3,198
Cheyenne	3,159	77.73%	857	21.09%	28	0.69%	9	0.22%	11	0.27%	2,302	56.64%	4,064
Clay	2,920	77.74%	811	21.59%	9	0.24%	7	0.19%	9	0.24%	2,109	56.15%	3,756
Colfax	2,999	74.68%	981	24.43%	13	0.32%	10	0.25%	13	0.32%	2,018	50.25%	4,016
Cuming	3,931	82.93%	779	16.43%	23	0.49%	4	0.08%	3	0.06%	3,152	66.50%	4,740
Custer	4,749	80.94%	1,090	18.58%	8	0.14%	14	0.24%	6	0.10%	3,659	62.36%	5,867
Dakota	3,467	57.76%	2,510	41.82%	12	0.20%	8	0.13%	5	0.08%	957	15.94%	6,002
Dawes	3,326	78.59%	865	20.44%	18	0.43%	12	0.28%	11	0.26%	2,461	58.15%	4,232
Dawson	6,887	81.92%	1,487	17.69%	13	0.15%	13	0.15%	7	0.08%	5,400	64.23%	8,407
Deuel	962	82.43%	198	16.97%	7	0.60%	0	0.00%	0	0.00%	764	65.46%	1,167
Dixon	2,155	68.11%	986	31.16%	9	0.28%	9	0.28%	5	0.16%	1,169	36.95%	3,164
Dodge	10,201	70.15%	4,266	29.34%	41	0.28%	15	0.10%	18	0.12%	5,935	40.81%	14,541
Douglas	112,676	65.24%	58,979	34.15%	487	0.28%	279	0.16%	299	0.17%	53,697	31.09%	172,720
Dundy	992	80.98%	225	18.37%	5	0.41%	2	0.16%	1	0.08%	767	62.61%	1,225
Fillmore	2,474	70.46%	1,009	28.74%	10	0.28%	14	0.40%	4	0.11%	1,465	41.72%	3,511
Franklin	1,597	75.08%	522	24.54%	5	0.24%	2	0.09%	1	0.05%	1,075	50.54%	2,127
Frontier	1,351	83.55%	258	15.96%	4	0.25%	3	0.19%	1	0.06%	1,093	67.59%	1,617
Furnas	2,363	79.67%	579	19.52%	10	0.34%	9	0.30%	5	0.17%	1,784	60.15%	2,966
Gage	6,116	68.78%	2,709	30.47%	35	0.39%	17	0.19%	15	0.17%	3,407	38.31%	8,892
Garden	1,158	85.71%	180	13.32%	4	0.30%	4	0.30%	5	0.37%	978	72.39%	1,351
Garfield	899	81.43%	196	17.75%	4	0.36%	3	0.27%	2	0.18%	703	63.68%	1,104
Gosper	802	79.33%	201	19.88%	4	0.40%	2	0.20%	2	0.20%	601	59.45%	1,011
Grant	406	88.45%	51	11.11%	1	0.22%	1	0.22%	0	0.00%	355	77.34%	459
Greeley	948	65.74%	485	33.63%	3	0.21%	3	0.21%	3	0.21%	463	32.11%	1,442
Hall	13,193	73.47%	4,655	25.92%	46	0.26%	29	0.16%	33	0.18%	8,538	47.55%	17,956
Hamilton	3,418	79.77%	842	19.65%	11	0.26%	9	0.21%	5	0.12%	2,576	60.12%	4,285
Harlan	1,692	76.80%	493	22.38%	10	0.45%	5	0.23%	3	0.14%	1,199	54.42%	2,203
Hayes	593	85.45%	101	14.55%	0	0.00%	0	0.00%	0	0.00%	492	70.90%	694
Hitchcock	1,391	79.99%	341	19.61%	1	0.06%	4	0.23%	2	0.12%	1,050	60.38%	1,739
Holt	4,613	83.19%	893	16.10%	22	0.40%	13	0.23%	4	0.07%	3,720	67.09%	5,545
Hooker	433	87.83%	55	11.16%	1	0.20%	3	0.61%	1	0.20%	378	76.67%	493
Howard	1,899	67.68%	887	31.61%	12	0.43%	5	0.18%	3	0.11%	1,012	36.07%	2,806
Jefferson	3,116	68.89%	1,367	30.22%	19	0.42%	13	0.29%	8	0.18%	1,749	38.67%	4,523
Johnson	1,542	64.36%	821	34.27%	15	0.63%	10	0.42%	8	0.33%	721	30.09%	2,396
Kearney	2,508	76.89%	726	22.26%	18	0.55%	8	0.25%	2	0.06%	1,782	54.63%	3,262
Keith	3,433	84.10%	631	15.46%	12	0.29%	5	0.12%	1	0.02%	2,802	68.64%	4,082
Keya Paha	507	79.84%	128	20.16%	0	0.00%	0	0.00%	0	0.00%	379	59.68%	635
Kimball	1,734	83.09%	339	16.24%	3	0.14%	3	0.14%	8	0.38%	1,395	66.85%	2,087
Knox	3,364	73.77%	1,149	25.20%	25	0.55%	15	0.33%	7	0.15%	2,215	48.57%	4,560
Lancaster	48,778	59.31%	32,898	40.00%	307	0.37%	122	0.15%	140	0.17%	15,880	19.31%	82,245
Lincoln	10,717	70.01%	4,509	29.46%	39	0.25%	24	0.16%	18	0.12%	6,208	40.55%	15,307
Logan	446	86.77%	67	13.04%	1	0.19%	0	0.00%	0	0.00%	379	73.73%	514
Loup	323	79.95%	79	19.55%	1	0.25%	1	0.25%	0	0.00%	244	60.40%	404
Madison	9,790	84.48%	1,757	15.16%	25	0.22%	5	0.04%	12	0.10%	8,033	69.32%	11,589
McPherson	295	82.87%	57	16.01%	3	0.84%	1	0.28%	0	0.00%	238	66.86%	356
Merrick	2,700	76.14%	818	23.07%	10	0.28%	11	0.31%	7	0.20%	1,882	53.07%	3,546
Morrill	1,888	79.80%	464	19.61%	7	0.30%	4	0.17%	3	0.13%	1,424	60.19%	2,366
Nance	1,393	72.14%	525	27.19%	9	0.47%	3	0.16%	1	0.05%	868	44.95%	1,931
Nemaha	2,752	72.55%	1,004	26.47%	21	0.55%	9	0.24%	7	0.18%	1,748	46.08%	3,793
Nuckolls	2,132	68.82%	947	30.57%	10	0.32%	4	0.13%	5	0.16%	1,185	38.25%	3,098
Otoe	4,679	70.94%	1,869	28.34%	26	0.39%	15	0.23%	7	0.11%	2,810	42.60%	6,596
Pawnee	1,306	69.32%	552	29.30%	10	0.53%	9	0.48%	7	0.37%	754	40.02%	1,884
Perkins	1,420	81.80%	307	17.68%	3	0.17%	2	0.12%	4	0.23%	1,113	64.12%	1,736
Phelps	3,741	83.11%	740	16.44%	10	0.22%	5	0.11%	5	0.11%	3,001	66.67%	4,501
Pierce	3,017	84.06%	545	15.19%	13	0.36%	9	0.25%	5	0.14%	2,472	68.87%	3,589
Platte	10,069	82.38%	2,061	16.86%	53	0.43%	25	0.20%	14	0.11%	8,008	65.52%	12,222
Polk	2,149	77.41%	610	21.97%	8	0.29%	6	0.22%	3	0.11%	1,539	55.44%	2,776
Red Willow	4,131	79.69%	1,026	19.79%	11	0.21%	12	0.23%	4	0.08%	3,105	59.90%	5,184
Richardson	3,634	71.28%	1,422	27.89%	22	0.43%	9	0.18%	11	0.22%	2,212	43.39%	5,098
Rock	873	85.34%	147	14.37%	1	0.10%	1	0.10%	1	0.10%	726	70.97%	1,023
Saline	2,942	54.54%	2,385	44.22%	34	0.63%	21	0.39%	12	0.22%	557	10.32%	5,394
Sarpy	20,192	74.37%	6,838	25.19%	64	0.24%	31	0.11%	25	0.09%	13,354	49.18%	27,150
Saunders	5,217	67.34%	2,467	31.84%	34	0.44%	14	0.18%	15	0.19%	2,750	35.50%	7,747
Scotts Bluff	10,711	77.18%	3,074	22.15%	47	0.34%	21	0.15%	25	0.18%	7,637	55.03%	13,878
Seward	3,983	67.09%	1,911	32.19%	17	0.29%	17	0.29%	9	0.15%	2,072	34.90%	5,937
Sheridan	2,661	86.93%	377	12.32%	10	0.33%	8	0.26%	5	0.16%	2,284	74.61%	3,061
Sherman	1,144	61.44%	701	37.65%	6	0.32%	7	0.38%	4	0.21%	443	23.79%	1,862
Sioux	732	85.12%	121	14.07%	3	0.35%	2	0.23%	2	0.23%	611	71.05%	860
Stanton	2,082	83.01%	411	16.39%	10	0.40%	4	0.16%	1	0.04%	1,671	66.62%	2,508
Thayer	2,580	72.66%	946	26.64%	11	0.31%	6	0.17%	8	0.23%	1,634	46.02%	3,551
Thomas	298	79.68%	73	19.52%	1	0.27%	1	0.27%	1	0.27%	225	60.16%	374
Thurston	1,410	56.40%	1,077	43.08%	4	0.16%	5	0.20%	4	0.16%	333	13.32%	2,500
Valley	2,055	73.21%	739	26.33%	3	0.11%	7	0.25%	3	0.11%	1,316	46.88%	2,807
Washington	5,191	76.44%	1,565	23.05%	16	0.24%	12	0.18%	7	0.10%	3,626	53.39%	6,791
Wayne	3,075	78.13%	833	21.16%	11	0.28%	9	0.23%	8	0.20%	2,242	56.97%	3,936
Webster	1,694	71.93%	645	27.39%	5	0.21%	5	0.21%	6	0.25%	1,049	44.54%	2,355
Wheeler	365	78.49%	97	20.86%	3	0.65%	0	0.00%	0	0.00%	268	57.63%	465
York	5,147	82.08%	1,124	17.92%	0	0.00%	0	0.00%	0	0.00%	4,023	64.16%	6,271
Totals	460,054	70.55%	187,866	28.81%	2,079	0.32%	1,066	0.16%	1,025	0.16%	272,188	41.74%	652,090

== See also ==
- United States presidential elections in Nebraska
- Presidency of Ronald Reagan
