= Sherman County Courthouse =

Sherman County Courthouse may refer to:

- Sherman County Courthouse (Kansas), Goodland, Kansas, designed by Routledge & Hertz and built c. 1930
- Sherman County Courthouse (Nebraska), Loup City, Nebraska, listed on the National Register of Historic Places (NRHP)
- Sherman County Courthouse (Oregon), Moro, Oregon, listed on the NRHP
