= 1972 United States presidential election in Nebraska =

- November 7, 1972

Nominee	Richard Nixon	George McGovern
Party	Republican	Democratic
Home state	California	South Dakota
Running mate	Spiro Agnew	Sargent Shriver
Electoral vote	5	0
Popular vote	406,298	169,991
Percentage	70.50%	29.50%
County results
Nixon
50–60%
60–70%
70–80%
80–90%
President before election
Richard Nixon
Republican
Elected President
Richard Nixon
Republican

The 1972 United States presidential election in Nebraska took place on November 7, 1972, as part of the 1972 United States presidential election. Voters chose five representatives, or electors, to the Electoral College, who voted for president and vice president.

Nebraska was won by incumbent President Richard Nixon (R–California), with 70.5% of the popular vote, against George McGovern (D–South Dakota), with 29.5% of the popular vote.

In a state that would reflect McGovern's national results, the Democratic nominee did not win a single county in Nebraska. Out of Nixon's three campaigns, this was the only one in which Nebraska was not his strongest state, although he did outperform his past two performances here in popular vote percentage. Instead, Nebraska was his seventh strongest state after Mississippi, Georgia, Oklahoma, Alabama, Florida, and South Carolina.

== Results ==
1972 United States presidential election in Nebraska
Party	Candidate	Votes	%
Republican	Richard Nixon (inc.)	406,298	70.50%
Democratic	George McGovern	169,991	29.50%
Total votes		576,289	100%

=== Results by county ===
County	Richard Nixon Republican		George McGovern Democratic		Margin		Total votes cast
County	#	%	#	%	#	%	Total votes cast
Adams	8,841	72.47%	3,359	27.53%	5,482	44.94%	12,200
Antelope	3,228	79.14%	851	20.86%	2,377	58.28%	4,079
Arthur	236	83.99%	45	16.01%	191	67.98%	281
Banner	404	80.80%	96	19.20%	308	61.60%	500
Blaine	343	85.96%	56	14.04%	287	71.92%	399
Boone	2,406	73.15%	883	26.85%	1,523	46.30%	3,289
Box Butte	3,431	78.14%	960	21.86%	2,471	56.28%	4,391
Boyd	1,419	73.71%	506	26.29%	913	47.42%	1,925
Brown	1,462	81.58%	330	18.42%	1,132	63.16%	1,792
Buffalo	8,587	74.19%	2,988	25.81%	5,599	48.38%	11,575
Burt	2,937	76.54%	900	23.46%	2,037	53.08%	3,837
Butler	2,301	55.94%	1,812	44.06%	489	11.88%	4,113
Cass	4,503	71.39%	1,805	28.61%	2,698	42.78%	6,308
Cedar	2,995	62.37%	1,807	37.63%	1,188	24.74%	4,802
Chase	1,318	81.11%	307	18.89%	1,011	62.22%	1,625
Cherry	2,610	84.93%	463	15.07%	2,147	69.86%	3,073
Cheyenne	3,120	76.66%	950	23.34%	2,170	53.32%	4,070
Clay	2,542	74.70%	861	25.30%	1,681	49.40%	3,403
Colfax	2,799	71.66%	1,107	28.34%	1,692	43.32%	3,906
Cuming	3,810	78.90%	1,019	21.10%	2,791	57.80%	4,829
Custer	4,836	80.83%	1,147	19.17%	3,689	61.66%	5,983
Dakota	2,879	62.22%	1,748	37.78%	1,131	24.44%	4,627
Dawes	2,987	80.77%	711	19.23%	2,276	61.54%	3,698
Dawson	6,211	81.35%	1,424	18.65%	4,787	62.70%	7,635
Deuel	1,001	81.71%	224	18.29%	777	63.42%	1,225
Dixon	2,299	70.96%	941	29.04%	1,358	41.92%	3,240
Dodge	9,837	72.00%	3,826	28.00%	6,011	44.00%	13,663
Douglas	101,579	67.82%	48,201	32.18%	53,378	35.64%	149,780
Dundy	1,003	81.94%	221	18.06%	782	63.88%	1,224
Fillmore	2,511	66.41%	1,270	33.59%	1,241	32.82%	3,781
Franklin	1,510	71.60%	599	28.40%	911	43.20%	2,109
Frontier	1,315	80.23%	324	19.77%	991	60.46%	1,639
Furnas	2,282	77.15%	676	22.85%	1,606	54.30%	2,958
Gage	6,298	63.71%	3,588	36.29%	2,710	27.42%	9,886
Garden	1,161	85.05%	204	14.95%	957	70.10%	1,365
Garfield	903	81.21%	209	18.79%	694	62.42%	1,112
Gosper	829	77.40%	242	22.60%	587	54.80%	1,071
Grant	376	84.49%	69	15.51%	307	68.98%	445
Greeley	1,005	56.94%	760	43.06%	245	13.88%	1,765
Hall	10,987	72.26%	4,218	27.74%	6,769	44.52%	15,205
Hamilton	2,960	76.55%	907	23.45%	2,053	53.10%	3,867
Harlan	1,549	74.19%	539	25.81%	1,010	48.38%	2,088
Hayes	486	79.80%	123	20.20%	363	59.60%	609
Hitchcock	1,339	78.63%	364	21.37%	975	57.26%	1,703
Holt	4,147	79.75%	1,053	20.25%	3,094	59.50%	5,200
Hooker	394	88.34%	52	11.66%	342	76.68%	446
Howard	1,691	64.15%	945	35.85%	746	28.30%	2,636
Jefferson	3,008	67.08%	1,476	32.92%	1,532	34.16%	4,484
Johnson	1,637	64.10%	917	35.90%	720	28.20%	2,554
Kearney	2,203	74.38%	759	25.62%	1,444	48.76%	2,962
Keith	2,513	79.07%	665	20.93%	1,848	58.14%	3,178
Keya Paha	563	79.41%	146	20.59%	417	58.82%	709
Kimball	1,650	79.06%	437	20.94%	1,213	58.12%	2,087
Knox	3,318	72.02%	1,289	27.98%	2,029	44.04%	4,607
Lancaster	42,573	62.15%	25,924	37.85%	16,649	24.30%	68,497
Lincoln	7,502	69.97%	3,220	30.03%	4,282	39.94%	10,722
Logan	320	81.42%	73	18.58%	247	62.84%	393
Loup	345	85.61%	58	14.39%	287	71.22%	403
Madison	8,580	79.42%	2,224	20.58%	6,356	58.84%	10,804
McPherson	247	85.47%	42	14.53%	205	70.94%	289
Merrick	2,418	73.16%	887	26.84%	1,531	46.32%	3,305
Morrill	1,740	76.99%	520	23.01%	1,220	53.98%	2,260
Nance	1,413	68.79%	641	31.21%	772	37.58%	2,054
Nemaha	2,600	74.10%	909	25.90%	1,691	48.20%	3,509
Nuckolls	2,089	67.65%	999	32.35%	1,090	35.30%	3,088
Otoe	4,815	73.70%	1,718	26.30%	3,097	47.40%	6,533
Pawnee	1,299	71.26%	524	28.74%	775	42.52%	1,823
Perkins	1,165	76.70%	354	23.30%	811	53.40%	1,519
Phelps	3,356	82.03%	735	17.97%	2,621	64.06%	4,091
Pierce	2,451	78.96%	653	21.04%	1,798	57.92%	3,104
Platte	7,871	73.38%	2,855	26.62%	5,016	46.76%	10,726
Polk	2,050	71.25%	827	28.75%	1,223	42.50%	2,877
Red Willow	3,701	79.90%	931	20.10%	2,770	59.80%	4,632
Richardson	3,662	70.83%	1,508	29.17%	2,154	41.66%	5,170
Rock	937	87.16%	138	12.84%	799	74.32%	1,075
Saline	2,828	51.59%	2,654	48.41%	174	3.18%	5,482
Sarpy	11,514	74.68%	3,904	25.32%	7,610	49.36%	15,418
Saunders	4,282	63.13%	2,501	36.87%	1,781	26.26%	6,783
Scotts Bluff	8,649	75.78%	2,764	24.22%	5,885	51.56%	11,413
Seward	3,707	63.98%	2,087	36.02%	1,620	27.96%	5,794
Sheridan	2,386	83.22%	481	16.78%	1,905	66.44%	2,867
Sherman	1,099	57.54%	811	42.46%	288	15.08%	1,910
Sioux	639	83.20%	129	16.80%	510	66.40%	768
Stanton	1,662	77.66%	478	22.34%	1,184	55.32%	2,140
Thayer	2,274	69.93%	978	30.07%	1,296	39.86%	3,252
Thomas	397	84.47%	73	15.53%	324	68.94%	470
Thurston	1,565	65.07%	840	34.93%	725	30.14%	2,405
Valley	2,011	72.29%	771	27.71%	1,240	44.58%	2,782
Washington	4,290	75.38%	1,401	24.62%	2,889	50.76%	5,691
Wayne	2,659	74.67%	902	25.33%	1,757	49.34%	3,561
Webster	1,631	70.09%	696	29.91%	935	40.18%	2,327
Wheeler	361	81.12%	84	18.88%	277	62.24%	445
York	4,651	77.92%	1,318	22.08%	3,333	55.84%	5,969
Totals	406,298	70.50%	169,991	29.50%	236,307	41.00%	576,289

== See also ==
- United States presidential elections in Nebraska
