= Ashton, Nebraska =

Village in Sherman County, Nebraska, United States

- Village
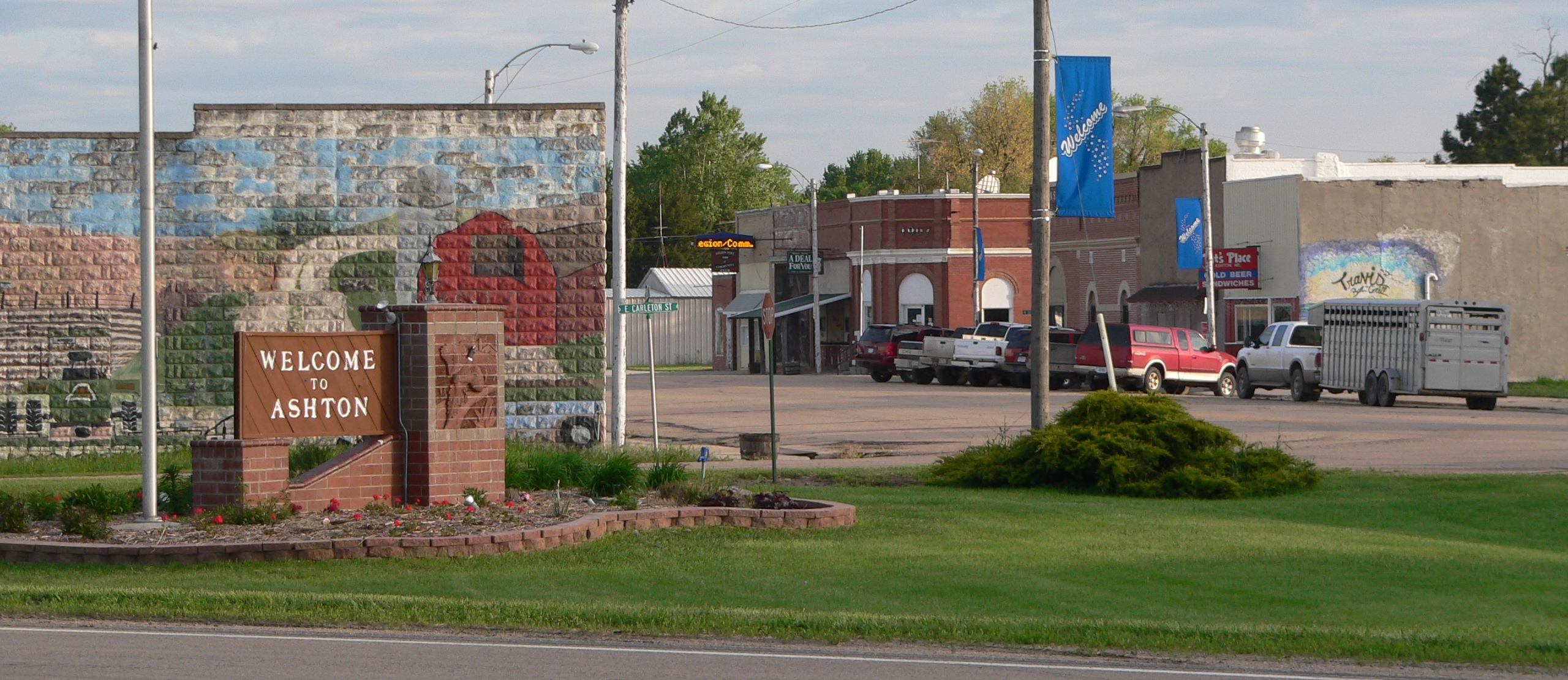
- Downtown Ashton: west side of Center Avenue, looking southwest from Nebraska Highway 92, May 2010

- Location of Ashton, Nebraska
- Coordinates: 41°14′52″N 98°47′43″W
- Country: United States
- State: Nebraska
- County: Sherman

Area
  - Total: 0.59 sq mi (1.53 km^{2})
  - Land: 0.59 sq mi (1.53 km^{2})
  - Water: 0 sq mi (0.00 km^{2})
- Elevation: 2,038 ft (621 m)

Population (2020)
  - Total: 198
  - Density: 334.5/sq mi (129.14/km^{2})
- Time zone: UTC-6 (Central (CST))
  - Summer (DST): UTC-5 (CDT)
- ZIP code: 68817
- Area code: 308
- FIPS code: 31-02375
- GNIS feature ID: 2398000

Ashton is a village in Sherman County, Nebraska, United States. As of the 2020 census, Ashton had a population of 198.

== History ==
Ashton was incorporated as a village in 1889, soon after the railroad established a depot there. An early settler being a native of Ashton, Illinois, caused the name to be selected.

== Geography ==
According to the United States Census Bureau, the village has a total area of 0.59 square miles (1.53 km^{2}), all land.

== Demographics ==
Historical population
Census	Pop.	Note	%±
1900	251		—
1910	404		61.0%
1920	397		−1.7%
1930	435		9.6%
1940	488		12.2%
1950	381		−21.9%
1960	320		−16.0%
1970	277		−13.4%
1980	273		−1.4%
1990	251		−8.1%
2000	237		−5.6%
2010	194		−18.1%
2020	198		2.1%
U.S. Decennial Census

=== 2010 census ===
As of the census of 2010, there were 194 people, 92 households, and 54 families residing in the village. The population density was 328.8 inhabitants per square mile (127.0/km^{2}). There were 114 housing units at an average density of 193.2 per square mile (74.6/km^{2}). The racial makeup of the village was 100.0% White.

There were 92 households, of which 22.8% had children under the age of 18 living with them, 50.0% were married couples living together, 6.5% had a female householder with no husband present, 2.2% had a male householder with no wife present, and 41.3% were non-families. 35.9% of all households were made up of individuals, and 16.3% had someone living alone who was 65 years of age or older. The average household size was 2.11 and the average family size was 2.76.

The median age in the village was 48.7 years. 18% of residents were under the age of 18; 10.3% were between the ages of 18 and 24; 15.9% were from 25 to 44; 34.5% were from 45 to 64; and 21.1% were 65 years of age or older. The gender makeup of the village was 49.0% male and 51.0% female.

=== 2000 census ===
As of the census of 2000, there were 237 people, 102 households, and 67 families residing in the village. The population density was 406.4 inhabitants per square mile (156.9/km^{2}). There were 120 housing units at an average density of 205.8 per square mile (79.5/km^{2}). The racial makeup of the village was 97.89% White, 0.42% Native American, and 1.69% from two or more races. Hispanic or Latino of any race were 0.42% of the population.

There were 102 households, out of which 31.4% had children under the age of 18 living with them, 56.9% were married couples living together, 6.9% had a female householder with no husband present, and 34.3% were non-families. 31.4% of all households were made up of individuals, and 16.7% had someone living alone who was 65 years of age or older. The average household size was 2.32 and the average family size was 2.97.

In the village, the population was spread out, with 25.7% under the age of 18, 5.5% from 18 to 24, 28.3% from 25 to 44, 20.3% from 45 to 64, and 20.3% who were 65 years of age or older. The median age was 40 years. For every 100 females, there were 91.1 males. For every 100 females age 18 and over, there were 93.4 males.

As of 2000 the median income for a household in the village was $28,750, and the median income for a family was $32,969. Males had a median income of $21,591 versus $16,250 for females. The per capita income for the village was $12,909. About 3.2% of families and 3.9% of the population were below the poverty line, including 4.4% of those under the age of eighteen and 9.1% of those 65 or over.

== See also ==
- List of municipalities in Nebraska
