= 1968 United States presidential election in Nebraska =

- November 5, 1968

Nominee	Richard Nixon	Hubert Humphrey	George Wallace
Party	Republican	Democratic	American Independent
Home state	New York (Note: Although he was born in California and he served as a U.S. senator from California, in 1968 Richard Nixon’s official state of residence was New York, because he moved there to practice law after his defeat in the 1962 California gubernatorial election. During his first term as president, Nixon re-established his residency in California. Consequently, most reliable reference books list Nixon's home state as New York in the 1968 election and his home state as California in the 1972 (and 1960) election.)	Minnesota	Alabama
Running mate	Spiro Agnew	Edmund Muskie	S. Marvin Griffin
Electoral vote	5	0	0
Popular vote	321,163	170,784	44,904
Percentage	59.82%	31.81%	8.36%
County results
Nixon
40–50%
50–60%
60–70%
70–80%
80–90%
Humphrey
40–50%
President before election
Lyndon B. Johnson
Democratic
Elected President
Richard Nixon
Republican

The 1968 United States presidential election in Nebraska took place on November 5, 1968, as part of the 1968 United States presidential election. Voters chose five representatives, or electors, to the Electoral College, who voted for president and vice president.

Nebraska was won by the Republican candidate former Vice President Richard Nixon, with 59.82% of the popular vote, against the Democratic candidate former Senator and incumbent Vice President Hubert Humphrey, with 31.81% of the popular vote. American candidate George Wallace performed decently, finishing with 8.36% of the popular vote.

With 59.82% of the popular vote, Nebraska would prove to be Nixon's best state in the election, just as it had been eight years earlier.

== Primary elections ==
Primary elections were held on May 14, 1968. The presidential primaries were a preference poll and nonbinding.

=== Democratic primary results ===
Although the primary was nonbinding, 24 out of the 28 delegates were uncommitted. Of the 28 delegates 3 were pledged to Kennedy and 1 to McCarthy.

Candidate	Number of votes	% of the vote
Robert F. Kennedy	84,102	51.72%
Eugene McCarthy	50,655	31.15%
Hubert Humphrey (Write-in)	12,087	7.43%
Lyndon B. Johnson	9,187	5.65%
Richard M. Nixon (Write-in)	2,731	1.68%
Ronald Reagan (Write-in)	1,905	1.17%
George Wallace (Write-in)	1,298	0.80%
Nelson Rockefeller (Write-in)	509	0.31%
Other candidates	125	0.08%
Americus "Mike" Liberator (Write-in)	12	0.01%
Total	162,611	100%

=== Republican primary results ===
Despite the fact the primary was nonbinding, 1 of the 16 delegates was uncommitted "but known to favor Nixon" while the rest were pledged to Nixon.

Candidate	Number of votes	% of the vote
Richard Nixon	140,336	69.92%
Ronald Reagan	42,703	21.28%
Nelson Rockefeller (Write-in)	10,225	5.09%
Harold Stassen	2,638	1.31%
Eugene McCarthy (Write-in)	1,544	0.77%
Americus "Mike" Liberator	1,302	0.65%
Robert F. Kennedy (Write-in)	885	0.44%
George Wallace (Write-in)	533	0.27%
Other candidates	232	0.12%
Hubert Humphrey (Write-in)	219	0.11%
George W. Romney (Write-in)	40	0.11%
John Lindsay (Write-in)	32	0.02%
Lyndon B. Johnson (Write-in)	19	0.01%
Total	198,069	100%

=== American Independent primary results ===
Candidate	Number of votes	% of the vote
George Wallace	493	97.8%
Other candidates (Write-ins)	11	2.2%
Total	504	100%

== Results ==
1968 United States presidential election in Nebraska
Party	Candidate	Votes	%
Republican	Richard Nixon	321,163	59.82%
Democratic	Hubert Humphrey	170,784	31.81%
American	George Wallace	44,904	8.36%
Total votes		536,851	100%

=== Results by county ===
County	Richard Nixon Republican		Hubert Humphrey Democratic		George Wallace American		Margin		Total votes cast
County	#	%	#	%	#	%	#	%	Total votes cast
Adams	7,191	63.29%	3,524	31.02%	647	5.69%	3,667	32.27%	11,362
Antelope	2,805	68.13%	952	23.12%	360	8.74%	1,853	45.01%	4,117
Arthur	218	77.86%	47	16.79%	15	5.36%	171	61.07%	280
Banner	350	71.28%	72	14.66%	69	14.05%	278	56.62%	491
Blaine	344	79.45%	64	14.78%	25	5.77%	280	64.67%	433
Boone	2,179	64.01%	934	27.44%	291	8.55%	1,245	36.57%	3,404
Box Butte	2,728	67.47%	1,052	26.02%	263	6.51%	1,676	41.45%	4,043
Boyd	1,250	64.63%	437	22.60%	247	12.77%	813	42.03%	1,934
Brown	1,340	71.62%	369	19.72%	162	8.66%	971	51.90%	1,871
Buffalo	6,786	65.29%	2,875	27.66%	733	7.05%	3,911	37.63%	10,394
Burt	2,615	68.55%	937	24.56%	263	6.89%	1,678	43.99%	3,815
Butler	1,646	46.84%	1,544	43.94%	324	9.22%	102	2.90%	3,514
Cass	3,185	57.61%	1,739	31.45%	605	10.94%	1,446	26.16%	5,529
Cedar	2,853	61.53%	1,444	31.14%	340	7.33%	1,409	30.39%	4,637
Chase	1,171	67.81%	363	21.02%	193	11.18%	808	46.79%	1,727
Cherry	2,199	73.23%	582	19.38%	222	7.39%	1,617	53.85%	3,003
Cheyenne	2,725	65.95%	993	24.03%	414	10.02%	1,732	41.92%	4,132
Clay	2,273	66.58%	935	27.39%	206	6.03%	1,338	39.19%	3,414
Colfax	2,264	64.48%	932	26.55%	315	8.97%	1,332	37.93%	3,511
Cuming	3,254	72.55%	935	20.85%	296	6.60%	2,319	51.70%	4,485
Custer	4,325	70.52%	1,407	22.94%	401	6.54%	2,918	47.58%	6,133
Dakota	2,383	56.60%	1,541	36.60%	286	6.79%	842	20.00%	4,210
Dawes	2,600	71.94%	741	20.50%	273	7.55%	1,859	51.44%	3,614
Dawson	5,221	71.97%	1,614	22.25%	419	5.78%	3,607	49.72%	7,254
Deuel	997	75.25%	250	18.87%	78	5.89%	747	56.38%	1,325
Dixon	2,051	65.65%	890	28.49%	183	5.86%	1,161	37.16%	3,124
Dodge	8,059	63.78%	3,755	29.72%	822	6.51%	4,304	34.06%	12,636
Douglas	69,808	50.89%	51,617	37.63%	15,739	11.47%	18,191	13.26%	137,164
Dundy	1,001	72.01%	261	18.78%	128	9.21%	740	53.23%	1,390
Fillmore	2,213	59.60%	1,297	34.93%	203	5.47%	916	24.67%	3,713
Franklin	1,447	65.03%	626	28.13%	152	6.83%	821	36.90%	2,225
Frontier	1,183	70.21%	345	20.47%	157	9.32%	838	49.74%	1,685
Furnas	2,137	69.81%	701	22.90%	223	7.29%	1,436	46.91%	3,061
Gage	5,465	55.73%	3,704	37.77%	637	6.50%	1,761	17.96%	9,806
Garden	1,120	78.60%	206	14.46%	99	6.95%	914	64.14%	1,425
Garfield	797	76.41%	183	17.55%	63	6.04%	614	58.86%	1,043
Gosper	701	71.02%	229	23.20%	57	5.78%	472	47.82%	987
Grant	311	74.94%	84	20.24%	20	4.82%	227	54.70%	415
Greeley	882	50.03%	739	41.92%	142	8.05%	143	8.11%	1,763
Hall	8,457	61.01%	4,571	32.98%	833	6.01%	3,886	28.03%	13,861
Hamilton	2,592	70.94%	918	25.12%	144	3.94%	1,674	45.82%	3,654
Harlan	1,392	64.03%	579	26.63%	203	9.34%	813	37.40%	2,174
Hayes	496	71.26%	127	18.25%	73	10.49%	369	53.01%	696
Hitchcock	1,173	66.91%	387	22.08%	193	11.01%	786	44.83%	1,753
Holt	3,319	66.02%	1,278	25.42%	430	8.55%	2,041	40.60%	5,027
Hooker	350	87.94%	36	9.05%	12	3.02%	314	78.89%	398
Howard	1,256	51.37%	1,003	41.02%	186	7.61%	253	10.35%	2,445
Jefferson	2,793	60.23%	1,572	33.90%	272	5.87%	1,221	26.33%	4,637
Johnson	1,508	60.76%	759	30.58%	215	8.66%	749	30.18%	2,482
Kearney	1,806	64.00%	825	29.23%	191	6.77%	981	34.77%	2,822
Keith	2,126	70.91%	694	23.15%	178	5.94%	1,432	47.76%	2,998
Keya Paha	531	76.96%	109	15.80%	50	7.25%	422	61.16%	690
Kimball	1,423	68.61%	414	19.96%	237	11.43%	1,009	48.65%	2,074
Knox	3,129	68.20%	1,131	24.65%	328	7.15%	1,998	43.55%	4,588
Lancaster	33,051	55.52%	23,539	39.54%	2,940	4.94%	9,512	15.98%	59,530
Lincoln	5,996	58.39%	3,491	34.00%	782	7.62%	2,505	24.39%	10,269
Logan	363	66.36%	130	23.77%	54	9.87%	233	42.59%	547
Loup	331	76.44%	64	14.78%	38	8.78%	267	61.66%	433
Madison	7,066	70.35%	2,364	23.54%	614	6.11%	4,702	46.81%	10,044
McPherson	236	76.13%	40	12.90%	34	10.97%	196	63.23%	310
Merrick	2,031	65.88%	840	27.25%	212	6.88%	1,191	38.63%	3,083
Morrill	1,516	68.66%	480	21.74%	212	9.60%	1,036	46.92%	2,208
Nance	1,316	60.79%	677	31.27%	172	7.94%	639	29.52%	2,165
Nemaha	2,290	63.47%	1,023	28.35%	295	8.18%	1,267	35.12%	3,608
Nuckolls	1,894	59.32%	1,127	35.30%	172	5.39%	767	24.02%	3,193
Otoe	3,840	65.96%	1,508	25.90%	474	8.14%	2,332	40.06%	5,822
Pawnee	1,209	60.30%	583	29.08%	213	10.62%	626	31.22%	2,005
Perkins	1,165	70.52%	360	21.79%	127	7.69%	805	48.73%	1,652
Phelps	2,976	73.39%	825	20.35%	254	6.26%	2,151	53.04%	4,055
Pierce	2,408	73.44%	674	20.56%	197	6.01%	1,734	52.88%	3,279
Platte	5,817	60.69%	2,999	31.29%	768	8.01%	2,818	29.40%	9,584
Polk	1,795	66.83%	690	25.69%	201	7.48%	1,105	41.14%	2,686
Red Willow	3,066	67.02%	1,145	25.03%	364	7.96%	1,921	41.99%	4,575
Richardson	3,133	59.66%	1,591	30.30%	527	10.04%	1,542	29.36%	5,251
Rock	791	76.72%	146	14.16%	94	9.12%	645	62.56%	1,031
Saline	2,341	44.73%	2,543	48.59%	350	6.69%	-202	-3.86%	5,234
Sarpy	6,019	52.48%	3,506	30.57%	1,945	16.96%	2,513	21.91%	11,470
Saunders	3,429	57.39%	1,990	33.31%	556	9.31%	1,439	24.08%	5,975
Scotts Bluff	7,356	67.17%	2,649	24.19%	946	8.64%	4,707	42.98%	10,951
Seward	2,939	60.59%	1,658	34.18%	254	5.24%	1,281	26.41%	4,851
Sheridan	2,236	76.29%	454	15.49%	241	8.22%	1,782	60.80%	2,931
Sherman	955	48.09%	851	42.85%	180	9.06%	104	5.24%	1,986
Sioux	565	71.43%	157	19.85%	69	8.72%	408	51.58%	791
Stanton	1,408	71.36%	411	20.83%	154	7.81%	997	50.53%	1,973
Thayer	2,331	65.31%	1,061	29.73%	177	4.96%	1,270	35.58%	3,569
Thomas	354	76.79%	76	16.49%	31	6.72%	278	60.30%	461
Thurston	1,341	56.99%	802	34.08%	210	8.92%	539	22.91%	2,353
Valley	1,759	64.41%	793	29.04%	179	6.55%	966	35.37%	2,731
Washington	3,063	63.36%	1,279	26.46%	492	10.18%	1,784	36.90%	4,834
Wayne	2,582	72.53%	786	22.08%	192	5.39%	1,796	50.45%	3,560
Webster	1,521	61.13%	781	31.39%	186	7.48%	740	29.74%	2,488
Wheeler	323	64.21%	131	26.04%	49	9.74%	192	38.17%	503
York	3,923	72.39%	1,237	22.83%	259	4.78%	2,686	49.56%	5,419
Totals	321,163	59.82%	170,784	31.81%	44,904	8.36%	150,379	28.01%	536,851

==== Counties that flipped from Democratic to Republican ====
- Adams
- Buffalo
- Butler
- Cass
- Cedar
- Clay
- Colfax
- Dakota
- Dixon
- Douglas
- Franklin
- Hall
- Howard
- Kearney
- Lincoln
- Lancaster
- Logan
- Nance
- Nemaha
- Nuckolls
- Boone
- Greeley
- Fillmore
- Gage
- Jefferson
- Johnson
- Platte
- Polk
- Richardson
- Sarpy
- Saunders
- Seward
- Sherman
- Thayer
- Thurston
- Washington
- Webster

== See also ==
- United States presidential elections in Nebraska
