= 1920 United States presidential election in Nebraska =

- November 2, 1920
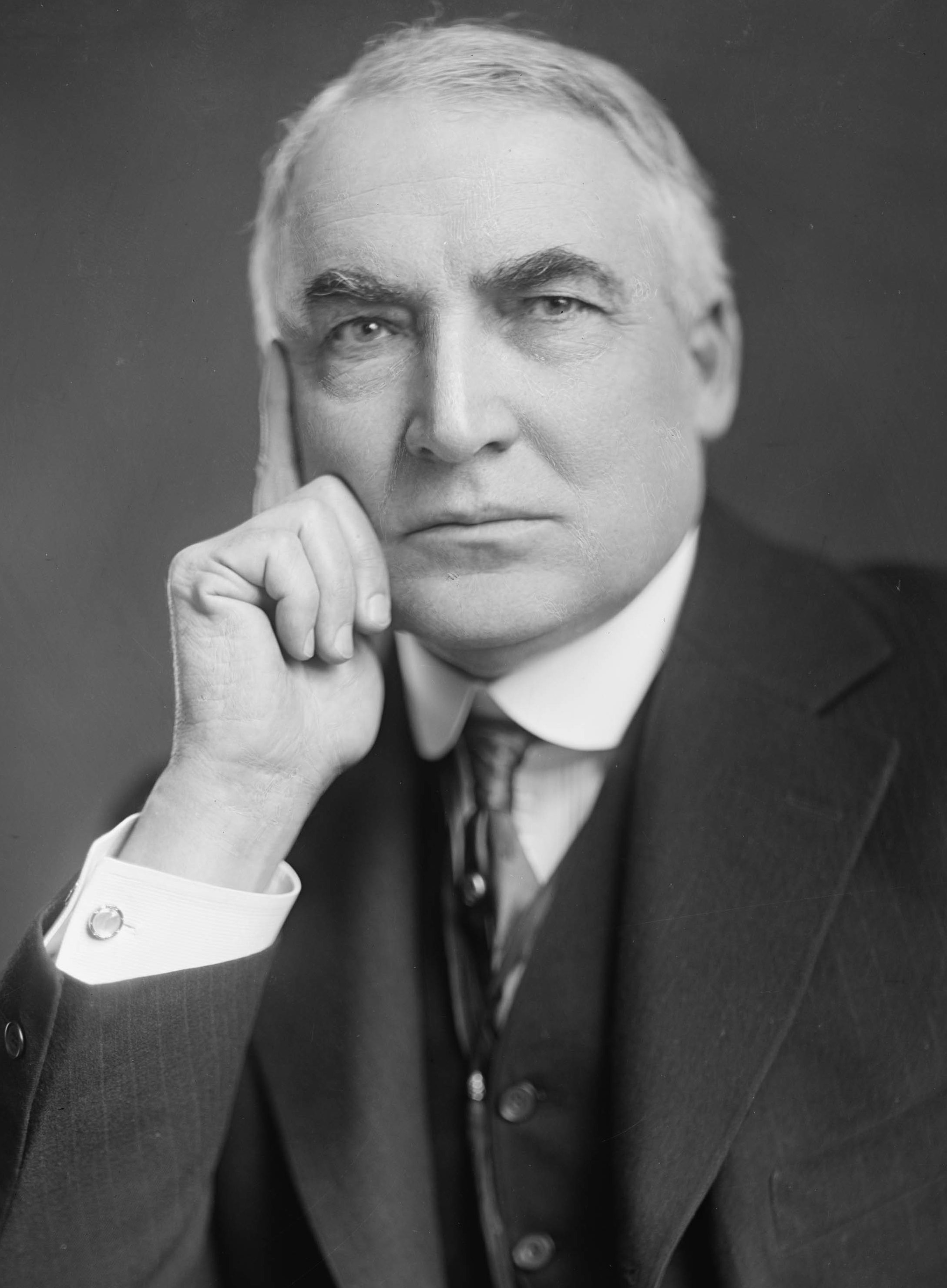

Nominee	Warren G. Harding	James M. Cox
Party	Republican	Democratic
Home state	Ohio	Ohio
Running mate	Calvin Coolidge	Franklin D. Roosevelt
Electoral vote	8	0
Popular vote	247,498	119,608
Percentage	64.66%	31.25%
County results
Harding
50–60%
60–70%
70–80%
President before election
Woodrow Wilson
Democratic
Elected President
Warren G. Harding
Republican

The 1920 United States presidential election in Nebraska took place on November 2, 1920, as part of the 1920 United States presidential election which was held throughout all contemporary 48 states. Voters chose eight representatives, or electors to the Electoral College, who voted for president and vice president.

Nebraska voted strongly for Republican nominee, Senator Warren G. Harding of Ohio, over the Democratic nominee, Governor James M. Cox of Ohio. Harding ran with Governor Calvin Coolidge of Massachusetts, while Cox ran with Assistant Secretary of the Navy Franklin D. Roosevelt of New York. Harding won every county in the state, although the trend – dramatic as it was – was substantially smaller than Harding's landslides in heavily German-American North and South Dakota. This was the first time since 1904 that Nebraska voted Republican in a presidential election.

== Results ==
Presidential Candidate	Running Mate	Party	Electoral Vote (EV)	Popular Vote (PV)	
Warren G. Harding of Ohio	Calvin Coolidge	Republican	8	247,498	64.66%
James M. Cox	Franklin D. Roosevelt	Democratic	0	119,608	31.25%
Eugene V. Debs	Seymour Stedman	Socialist	0	9,600	2.51%
Aaron S. Watkins	D. Leigh Colvin	Prohibition	0	5,947	1.55%
—	—	Write-ins	0	90	0.02%

=== Results by county ===
County	Warren Gamaliel Harding Republican		James Middleton Cox Democratic		Eugene Victor Debs Socialist		Aaron Sherman Watkins Prohibition		Margin		Total votes cast
County	#	%	#	%	#	%	#	%	#	%	Total votes cast
Adams	4,849	69.19%	1,932	27.57%	118	1.68%	109	1.56%	2,917	41.62%	7,008
Antelope	3,322	70.91%	1,154	24.63%	83	1.77%	126	2.69%	2,168	46.28%	4,685
Arthur	167	57.00%	94	32.08%	18	6.14%	14	4.78%	73	24.91%	293
Banner	258	72.47%	69	19.38%	24	6.74%	5	1.40%	189	53.09%	356
Blaine	328	63.81%	176	34.24%	6	1.17%	4	0.78%	152	29.57%	514
Boone	3,108	65.97%	1,461	31.01%	60	1.27%	82	1.74%	1,647	34.96%	4,711
Box Butte	1,630	65.12%	756	30.20%	65	2.60%	52	2.08%	874	34.92%	2,503
Boyd	1,482	70.04%	527	24.91%	79	3.73%	28	1.32%	955	45.13%	2,116
Brown	1,417	68.62%	558	27.02%	33	1.60%	57	2.76%	859	41.60%	2,065
Buffalo	4,954	65.56%	2,258	29.88%	177	2.34%	168	2.22%	2,696	35.68%	7,557
Burt	2,969	70.22%	1,194	28.24%	47	1.11%	18	0.43%	1,775	41.98%	4,228
Butler	2,478	55.24%	1,918	42.76%	40	0.89%	50	1.11%	560	12.48%	4,486
Cass	3,575	58.35%	2,192	35.78%	245	4.00%	115	1.88%	1,383	22.57%	6,127
Cedar	3,906	74.50%	1,279	24.39%	35	0.67%	23	0.44%	2,627	50.10%	5,243
Chase	976	66.17%	414	28.07%	33	2.24%	52	3.53%	562	38.10%	1,475
Cherry	1,636	66.37%	711	28.84%	66	2.68%	52	2.11%	925	37.53%	2,465
Cheyenne	1,857	71.92%	604	23.39%	76	2.94%	45	1.74%	1,253	48.53%	2,582
Clay	3,392	67.73%	1,466	29.27%	79	1.58%	71	1.42%	1,926	38.46%	5,008
Colfax	1,992	66.29%	957	31.85%	42	1.40%	14	0.47%	1,035	34.44%	3,005
Cuming	3,177	78.64%	764	18.91%	81	2.00%	18	0.45%	2,413	59.73%	4,040
Custer	4,974	59.31%	2,739	32.66%	387	4.61%	263	3.14%	2,235	26.65%	8,387 (Note: 24 write-in votes for various candidates were recorded from this county.)
Dakota	1,525	62.58%	873	35.82%	28	1.15%	11	0.45%	652	26.75%	2,437
Dawes	1,801	64.60%	900	32.28%	63	2.26%	24	0.86%	901	32.32%	2,788
Dawson	3,384	65.99%	1,444	28.16%	140	2.73%	160	3.12%	1,940	37.83%	5,128
Deuel	684	64.83%	321	30.43%	35	3.32%	15	1.42%	363	34.41%	1,055
Dixon	2,435	71.43%	911	26.72%	16	0.47%	47	1.38%	1,524	44.71%	3,409
Dodge	4,832	70.40%	1,799	26.21%	161	2.35%	72	1.05%	3,033	44.19%	6,864
Douglas	28,543	57.81%	18,439	37.34%	2,116	4.29%	246	0.50%	10,104	20.46%	49,375 (Note: 31 write-in votes for various candidates were recorded from this county.)
Dundy	1,094	69.59%	375	23.85%	70	4.45%	33	2.10%	719	45.74%	1,572
Fillmore	2,803	63.43%	1,549	35.05%	26	0.59%	41	0.93%	1,254	28.38%	4,419
Franklin	2,294	67.41%	1,030	30.27%	36	1.06%	43	1.26%	1,264	37.14%	3,403
Frontier	1,750	68.09%	673	26.19%	66	2.57%	81	3.15%	1,077	41.91%	2,570
Furnas	2,445	60.53%	1,371	33.94%	72	1.78%	151	3.74%	1,074	26.59%	4,039
Gage	6,059	68.96%	2,477	28.19%	106	1.21%	144	1.64%	3,582	40.77%	8,786
Garden	924	66.24%	421	30.18%	26	1.86%	24	1.72%	503	36.06%	1,395
Garfield	611	64.32%	252	26.53%	65	6.84%	22	2.32%	359	37.79%	950
Gosper	794	58.04%	486	35.53%	41	3.00%	47	3.44%	308	22.51%	1,368
Grant	256	64.16%	141	35.34%	2	0.50%	0	0.00%	115	28.82%	399
Greeley	1,345	51.38%	1,180	45.07%	58	2.22%	35	1.34%	165	6.30%	2,618
Hall	4,719	66.25%	1,724	24.20%	582	8.17%	98	1.38%	2,995	42.05%	7,123
Hamilton	2,950	66.89%	1,356	30.75%	45	1.02%	59	1.34%	1,594	36.15%	4,410
Harlan	1,756	59.59%	974	33.05%	143	4.85%	74	2.51%	782	26.54%	2,947
Hayes	512	66.41%	207	26.85%	42	5.45%	10	1.30%	305	39.56%	771
Hitchcock	1,127	61.58%	615	33.61%	58	3.17%	30	1.64%	512	27.98%	1,830
Holt	3,163	64.58%	1,577	32.20%	75	1.53%	83	1.69%	1,586	32.38%	4,898
Hooker	230	63.54%	117	32.32%	8	2.21%	7	1.93%	113	31.22%	362
Howard	1,508	50.76%	1,311	44.13%	109	3.67%	43	1.45%	197	6.63%	2,971
Jefferson	3,488	67.94%	1,408	27.43%	107	2.08%	131	2.55%	2,080	40.51%	5,134
Johnson	2,416	71.29%	909	26.82%	24	0.71%	40	1.18%	1,507	44.47%	3,389
Kearney	1,683	55.31%	1,273	41.83%	48	1.58%	39	1.28%	410	13.47%	3,043
Keith	1,050	64.73%	472	29.10%	77	4.75%	23	1.42%	578	35.64%	1,622
Keya Paha	479	64.73%	218	29.46%	29	3.92%	14	1.89%	261	35.27%	740
Kimball	910	70.05%	339	26.10%	25	1.92%	25	1.92%	571	43.96%	1,299
Knox	3,678	69.87%	1,470	27.93%	82	1.56%	34	0.65%	2,208	41.95%	5,264
Lancaster	15,638	62.58%	8,435	33.75%	382	1.53%	503	2.01%	7,203	28.82%	24,990 (Note: 32 write-in votes for various candidates were recorded from this county.)
Lincoln	3,342	57.40%	1,896	32.57%	400	6.87%	184	3.16%	1,446	24.84%	5,822
Logan	312	57.78%	180	33.33%	31	5.74%	17	3.15%	132	24.44%	540
Loup	343	66.73%	117	22.76%	35	6.81%	19	3.70%	226	43.97%	514
Madison	5,171	73.29%	1,716	24.32%	98	1.39%	71	1.01%	3,455	48.97%	7,056
McPherson	229	70.03%	75	22.94%	13	3.98%	10	3.06%	154	47.09%	327
Merrick	2,385	65.11%	1,075	29.35%	55	1.50%	148	4.04%	1,310	35.76%	3,663
Morrill	1,366	65.52%	667	31.99%	34	1.63%	18	0.86%	699	33.53%	2,085
Nance	1,877	69.49%	746	27.62%	40	1.48%	38	1.41%	1,131	41.87%	2,701
Nemaha	2,888	64.02%	1,512	33.52%	50	1.11%	61	1.35%	1,376	30.50%	4,511
Nuckolls	2,637	64.07%	1,337	32.48%	89	2.16%	53	1.29%	1,300	31.58%	4,116
Otoe	3,869	67.62%	1,671	29.20%	75	1.31%	107	1.87%	2,198	38.41%	5,722
Pawnee	2,510	69.88%	972	27.06%	35	0.97%	75	2.09%	1,538	42.82%	3,592
Perkins	722	61.19%	387	32.80%	48	4.07%	23	1.95%	335	28.39%	1,180
Phelps	2,324	61.91%	1,169	31.14%	152	4.05%	109	2.90%	1,155	30.77%	3,754
Pierce	2,478	75.11%	743	22.52%	45	1.36%	33	1.00%	1,735	52.59%	3,299
Platte	4,058	73.88%	1,367	24.89%	29	0.53%	39	0.71%	2,691	48.99%	5,493
Polk	2,393	63.80%	1,236	32.95%	43	1.15%	76	2.03%	1,157	30.85%	3,751 (Note: Three write-in votes for various candidates were recorded from this county.)
Red Willow	1,993	58.88%	1,133	33.47%	188	5.55%	71	2.10%	860	25.41%	3,385
Richardson	4,496	61.72%	2,679	36.78%	46	0.63%	63	0.86%	1,817	24.95%	7,284
Rock	621	70.17%	239	27.01%	14	1.58%	11	1.24%	382	43.16%	885
Saline	3,197	58.67%	2,172	39.86%	20	0.37%	60	1.10%	1,025	18.81%	5,449
Sarpy	1,662	59.78%	1,027	36.94%	70	2.52%	21	0.76%	635	22.84%	2,780
Saunders	3,733	59.99%	2,296	36.90%	127	2.04%	67	1.08%	1,437	23.09%	6,223
Scotts Bluff	3,189	71.52%	969	21.73%	162	3.63%	139	3.12%	2,220	49.79%	4,459
Seward	3,690	69.98%	1,497	28.39%	30	0.57%	56	1.06%	2,193	41.59%	5,273
Sheridan	1,714	64.53%	784	29.52%	106	3.99%	52	1.96%	930	35.02%	2,656
Sherman	1,582	60.96%	848	32.68%	110	4.24%	55	2.12%	734	28.29%	2,595
Sioux	627	64.97%	252	26.11%	58	6.01%	28	2.90%	375	38.86%	965
Stanton	1,457	72.67%	501	24.99%	32	1.60%	15	0.75%	956	47.68%	2,005
Thayer	3,456	73.31%	1,120	23.76%	78	1.65%	60	1.27%	2,336	49.55%	4,714
Thomas	305	55.86%	207	37.91%	21	3.85%	13	2.38%	98	17.95%	546
Thurston	1,667	63.34%	925	35.14%	29	1.10%	11	0.42%	742	28.19%	2,632
Valley	1,935	64.80%	912	30.54%	78	2.61%	61	2.04%	1,023	34.26%	2,986
Washington	2,409	63.60%	1,295	34.19%	39	1.03%	45	1.19%	1,114	29.41%	3,788
Wayne	2,312	74.46%	681	21.93%	69	2.22%	43	1.38%	1,631	52.53%	3,105
Webster	2,599	70.72%	913	24.84%	69	1.88%	94	2.56%	1,686	45.88%	3,675
Wheeler	352	57.52%	165	26.96%	85	13.89%	10	1.63%	187	30.56%	612
York	4,265	66.87%	1,857	29.12%	140	2.20%	116	1.82%	2,408	37.75%	6,378
Totals	247,498	64.66%	119,608	31.25%	9,600	2.51%	5,947	1.55%	127,890	33.41%	382,743

== See also ==
- United States presidential elections in Nebraska
