= Sherman County, Nebraska =

County in Nebraska, United States

- County
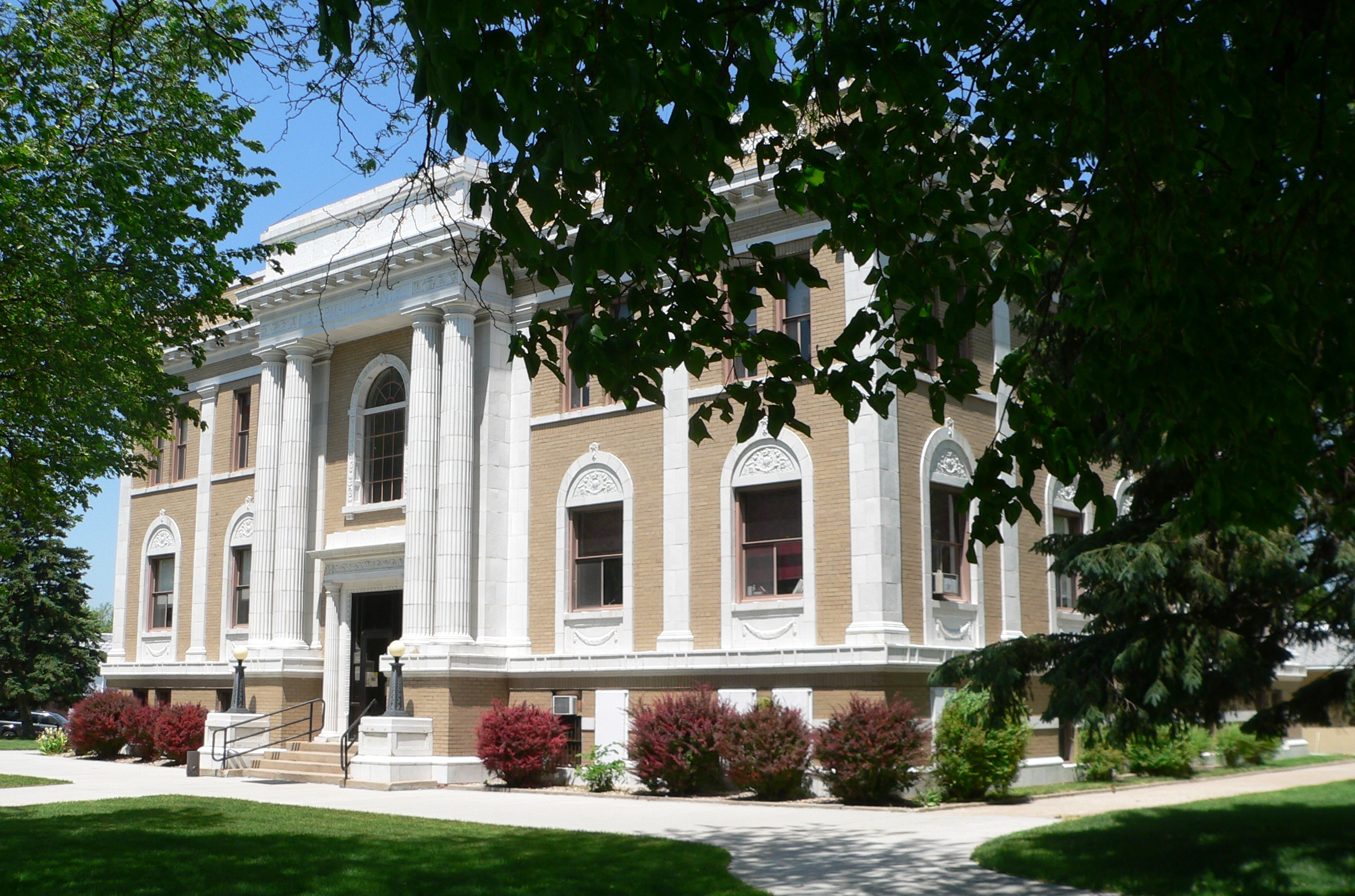
- Sherman County Courthouse in Loup City

- Location within the U.S. state of Nebraska
- Coordinates: 41°13′N 98°58′W
- Country: United States
- State: Nebraska
- Founded: 1870 (founded); 1872 (organized)
- Named for: William Tecumseh Sherman
- Seat: Loup City
- Largest city: Loup City

Area
  - Total: 572 sq mi (1,480 km^{2})
  - Land: 566 sq mi (1,470 km^{2})
  - Water: 5.8 sq mi (15 km^{2}) 1.0%

Population (2020)
  - Total: 2,959
  - Estimate (2025): 2,924 ▼
  - Density: 5.23/sq mi (2.02/km^{2})
- Time zone: UTC−6 (Central)
  - Summer (DST): UTC−5 (CDT)
- Congressional district: 3rd
- Website: shermancounty.nebraska.gov

Sherman County is a county in the U.S. state of Nebraska. As of the 2020 United States census, the population was 2,959. Its county seat is Loup City. The county was created in 1870, and was organized in 1872. It was named for American Civil War General William Tecumseh Sherman.

In the Nebraska license plate system, Sherman County is represented by the prefix 56 (it had the fifty-sixth-largest number of vehicles registered in the county when the license plate system was established in 1922).

== Geography ==
The terrain of Sherman County consists of rolling hills, sloping to the southeast. The area is partially dedicated to agriculture, with limited use of center pivot irrigation. The Middle Loup River flows south-southeastward through the eastern central part of the county. The western portions are drained by Clear Creek and Muddy Creek, which merge in the SW part of the county and exit the south boundary line, to discharge into Middle Loup River at a point southeast of the county's SE corner.

The county has a total area of 572 square miles (1,480 km^{2}), of which 566 square miles (1,470 km^{2}) is land and 5.8 square miles (15 km^{2}) (1.0%) is water.

=== Major highways ===
- Nebraska Highway 2
- Nebraska Highway 10
- Nebraska Highway 58
- Nebraska Highway 68
- Nebraska Highway 92

=== Adjacent counties ===
- Howard County – east
- Buffalo County – south
- Custer County – west
- Valley County – north
- Greeley County – northeast

=== Protected areas ===
- Sherman Reservoir State Recreation Area

== Demographics ==
Historical population
Census	Pop.	Note	%±
1880	2,061		—
1890	6,399		210.5%
1900	6,550		2.4%
1910	8,278		26.4%
1920	8,877		7.2%
1930	9,122		2.8%
1940	7,764		−14.9%
1950	6,421		−17.3%
1960	5,382		−16.2%
1970	4,725		−12.2%
1980	4,226		−10.6%
1990	3,718		−12.0%
2000	3,318		−10.8%
2010	3,152		−5.0%
2020	2,959		−6.1%
2025 (est.)	2,924	▼	−1.2%
U.S. Decennial Census; 1790-1960 1900-1990; 1990-2000 2010

=== 2020 census ===
As of the 2020 census, the county had a population of 2,959. The median age was 48.8 years. 21.4% of residents were under the age of 18 and 26.7% of residents were 65 years of age or older. For every 100 females there were 100.7 males, and for every 100 females age 18 and over there were 96.8 males age 18 and over.

The racial makeup of the county was 94.9% White, 0.3% Black or African American, 0.5% American Indian and Alaska Native, 0.2% Asian, 0.1% Native Hawaiian and Pacific Islander, 0.3% from some other race, and 3.7% from two or more races. Hispanic or Latino residents of any race comprised 2.8% of the population.

0.0% of residents lived in urban areas, while 100.0% lived in rural areas.

There were 1,305 households in the county, of which 25.8% had children under the age of 18 living with them and 22.0% had a female householder with no spouse or partner present. About 33.9% of all households were made up of individuals and 17.0% had someone living alone who was 65 years of age or older.

There were 1,789 housing units, of which 27.1% were vacant. Among occupied housing units, 77.1% were owner-occupied and 22.9% were renter-occupied. The homeowner vacancy rate was 3.4% and the rental vacancy rate was 9.9%.

=== 2000 census ===
As of the 2000 United States census, there were 3,152 people, 1,392 households, and 903 families in the county. The population density was 5.6 people per square mile (2.2 people/km^{2}). There were 1,392 occupied housing units and 1,941 total housing units. The racial makeup of the county was 99% White, 0.1% Black or African American, 0.1% Native American, 0.3% Asian, 0.1% from other races, and 0.4% from two or more races. 1% of the population were Hispanic or Latino of any race.

There were 1,392 households, out of which 27.6% had children under the age of 18 living with them, 59.2% were married couples living together, 5.7% had a female householder with no husband present, and 32.9% were non-families. 30.4% of all households were made up of individuals, and 16.7% had someone living alone who was 65 years of age or older. The average household size was 2.22 and the average family size was 2.78.

The county population contained 22.4% under the age of 18, 54.2% from 18 to 64, and 23.4% 65 years of age or older. The median age was 47.8 years. 50.9% of the population were female and 49.1% were male.

The median income for a household in the county was $39,041, and the median income for a family was $34,821. Males had a median income of $23,065 versus $17,269 for females. The per capita income for the county was $26,416. About 14.1% of the population were below the poverty line.

Sherman County is one of the main Polish-American communities in the state and in the country. As of the census of 2000, Americans of Polish ancestry comprised 29.6% of Sherman County's population.

== Communities ==
=== Cities ===
- Loup City (county seat)

=== Villages ===
- Ashton
- Hazard
- Litchfield
- Rockville

== Politics ==
Sherman County voters tend to vote Republican. In only three national elections since 1948 has the county selected the Democratic Party candidate (as of 2024).

United States presidential election results for Sherman County, Nebraska
Year	Republican		Democratic		Third party(ies)	
Year	No.	%	No.	%	No.	%
1900	503	38.63%	743	57.07%	56	4.30%
1904	809	56.30%	140	9.74%	488	33.96%
1908	776	43.74%	925	52.14%	73	4.11%
1912	455	24.45%	673	36.16%	733	39.39%
1916	706	34.81%	1,208	59.57%	114	5.62%
1920	1,582	60.96%	848	32.68%	165	6.36%
1924	1,182	39.88%	1,048	35.36%	734	24.76%
1928	1,675	48.76%	1,733	50.45%	27	0.79%
1932	952	25.79%	2,670	72.32%	70	1.90%
1936	1,294	32.01%	2,701	66.81%	48	1.19%
1940	1,494	44.18%	1,888	55.82%	0	0.00%
1944	1,309	45.25%	1,584	54.75%	0	0.00%
1948	1,003	38.41%	1,608	61.59%	0	0.00%
1952	1,784	60.47%	1,166	39.53%	0	0.00%
1956	1,429	53.97%	1,219	46.03%	0	0.00%
1960	1,131	44.21%	1,427	55.79%	0	0.00%
1964	762	31.83%	1,632	68.17%	0	0.00%
1968	955	48.09%	851	42.85%	180	9.06%
1972	1,099	57.54%	811	42.46%	0	0.00%
1976	935	44.67%	1,078	51.51%	80	3.82%
1980	1,254	63.65%	578	29.34%	138	7.01%
1984	1,144	61.44%	701	37.65%	17	0.91%
1988	915	51.67%	839	47.37%	17	0.96%
1992	736	38.74%	568	29.89%	596	31.37%
1996	822	49.16%	567	33.91%	283	16.93%
2000	1,072	62.87%	564	33.08%	69	4.05%
2004	1,072	65.25%	541	32.93%	30	1.83%
2008	950	60.43%	585	37.21%	37	2.35%
2012	927	60.59%	552	36.08%	51	3.33%
2016	1,150	73.11%	340	21.61%	83	5.28%
2020	1,322	77.76%	343	20.18%	35	2.06%
2024	1,344	79.43%	328	19.39%	20	1.18%

== See also ==
- National Register of Historic Places listings in Sherman County, Nebraska
