= 1976 United States presidential election in Nebraska =

- November 2, 1976

Nominee	Gerald Ford	Jimmy Carter
Party	Republican	Democratic
Home state	Michigan	Georgia
Running mate	Bob Dole	Walter Mondale
Electoral vote	5	0
Popular vote	359,705	233,692
Percentage	59.19%	38.46%
County results
Ford
40–50%
50–60%
60–70%
70–80%
Carter
50–60%
President before election
Gerald Ford
Republican
Elected President
Jimmy Carter
Democratic

The 1976 United States presidential election in Nebraska took place on November 2, 1976, as part of the 1976 United States presidential election. Voters chose five representatives, or electors, to the Electoral College, who voted for president and vice president.

Nebraska was won by incumbent President Gerald Ford (R–Michigan), with 59.19% of the popular vote, against Jimmy Carter (D–Georgia), with 38.46% of the popular vote. None of the third-party candidates amounted to a significant portion of the vote, but Eugene McCarthy (I–Minnesota) won 1.55% of Nebraska's popular vote and came third overall in the nation. Despite losing in Nebraska, Carter went on to win the national election and became the 39th president of the United States. As of the 2024 presidential election, this is the last election in which Butler County, Sherman County, and Greeley County voted for a Democratic presidential candidate.

With 59.19% of the popular vote, Nebraska, where Ford was born in Omaha as Leslie Lynch King Jr. in 1913, proved to be the incumbent President’s fourth strongest state in the 1976 election after Utah, Idaho and Wyoming.

== Results ==
1976 United States presidential election in Nebraska
Party	Candidate	Votes	%
Republican	Gerald Ford (inc.)	359,705	59.19%
Democratic	Jimmy Carter	233,692	38.46%
Independent	Eugene McCarthy	9,409	1.55%
American	Lester Maddox	3,380	0.56%
Libertarian	Roger MacBride	1,482	0.24%
Total votes		607,668	100%

=== Results by county ===
County	Gerald Ford Republican		Jimmy Carter Democratic		Eugene McCarthy Independent		Lester Maddox American		Roger MacBride Libertarian		Margin		Total votes cast
County	#	%	#	%	#	%	#	%	#	%	#	%	Total votes cast
Adams	7,623	59.42%	4,949	38.58%	160	1.25%	62	0.48%	35	0.27%	2,674	20.84%	12,829
Antelope	2,488	64.01%	1,325	34.09%	48	1.23%	19	0.49%	7	0.18%	1,163	29.92%	3,887
Arthur	193	73.66%	64	24.43%	4	1.53%	1	0.38%	0	0.00%	129	49.23%	262
Banner	281	54.78%	210	40.94%	10	1.95%	8	1.56%	4	0.78%	71	13.84%	513
Blaine	281	66.59%	133	31.52%	7	1.66%	1	0.24%	0	0.00%	148	35.07%	422
Boone	2,035	59.21%	1,329	38.67%	57	1.66%	11	0.32%	5	0.15%	706	20.54%	3,437
Box Butte	2,956	64.56%	1,516	33.11%	67	1.46%	29	0.63%	11	0.24%	1,440	31.45%	4,579
Boyd	1,004	55.13%	792	43.49%	12	0.66%	11	0.60%	2	0.11%	212	11.64%	1,821
Brown	1,241	67.59%	557	30.34%	23	1.25%	13	0.71%	2	0.11%	684	37.25%	1,836
Buffalo	8,095	63.36%	4,308	33.72%	208	1.63%	116	0.91%	50	0.39%	3,787	29.64%	12,777
Burt	2,510	63.27%	1,375	34.66%	55	1.39%	12	0.30%	15	0.38%	1,135	28.61%	3,967
Butler	1,809	42.36%	2,337	54.72%	81	1.90%	34	0.80%	10	0.23%	-528	-12.36%	4,271
Cass	3,807	53.31%	3,205	44.88%	90	1.26%	33	0.46%	6	0.08%	602	8.43%	7,141
Cedar	2,415	50.74%	2,225	46.74%	73	1.53%	30	0.63%	17	0.36%	190	4.00%	4,760
Chase	1,146	59.16%	725	37.43%	29	1.50%	14	0.72%	23	1.19%	421	21.73%	1,937
Cherry	2,197	68.83%	906	28.38%	49	1.54%	28	0.88%	12	0.38%	1,291	40.45%	3,192
Cheyenne	2,285	56.39%	1,665	41.09%	69	1.70%	24	0.59%	9	0.22%	620	15.30%	4,052
Clay	2,254	60.87%	1,369	36.97%	35	0.95%	37	1.00%	8	0.22%	885	23.90%	3,703
Colfax	2,364	57.34%	1,666	40.41%	64	1.55%	23	0.56%	6	0.15%	698	16.93%	4,123
Cuming	3,303	69.19%	1,374	28.78%	71	1.49%	16	0.34%	10	0.21%	1,929	40.41%	4,774
Custer	3,935	63.72%	1,985	32.15%	105	1.70%	113	1.83%	37	0.60%	1,950	31.57%	6,175
Dakota	2,631	52.67%	2,292	45.89%	53	1.06%	11	0.22%	8	0.16%	339	6.78%	4,995
Dawes	2,446	62.56%	1,286	32.89%	75	1.92%	91	2.33%	12	0.31%	1,160	29.67%	3,910
Dawson	5,413	67.79%	2,395	29.99%	85	1.06%	64	0.80%	28	0.35%	3,018	37.80%	7,985
Deuel	776	65.16%	398	33.42%	14	1.18%	3	0.25%	0	0.00%	378	31.74%	1,191
Dixon	1,981	59.35%	1,286	38.53%	48	1.44%	14	0.42%	9	0.27%	695	20.82%	3,338
Dodge	8,982	62.03%	5,283	36.48%	170	1.17%	28	0.19%	18	0.12%	3,699	25.55%	14,481
Douglas	93,204	58.69%	61,877	38.97%	2,873	1.81%	501	0.32%	342	0.22%	31,327	19.72%	158,797
Dundy	774	61.28%	457	36.18%	12	0.95%	11	0.87%	9	0.71%	317	25.10%	1,263
Fillmore	2,098	57.15%	1,489	40.56%	43	1.17%	34	0.93%	7	0.19%	609	16.59%	3,671
Franklin	1,170	54.09%	941	43.50%	29	1.34%	17	0.79%	6	0.28%	229	10.59%	2,163
Frontier	994	60.80%	588	35.96%	19	1.16%	29	1.77%	5	0.31%	406	24.84%	1,635
Furnas	1,851	60.21%	1,132	36.82%	34	1.11%	32	1.04%	25	0.81%	719	23.39%	3,074
Gage	5,199	52.54%	4,506	45.54%	122	1.23%	56	0.57%	12	0.12%	693	7.00%	9,895
Garden	928	63.91%	455	31.34%	35	2.41%	27	1.86%	7	0.48%	473	32.57%	1,452
Garfield	726	64.76%	343	30.60%	13	1.16%	38	3.39%	1	0.09%	383	34.16%	1,121
Gosper	654	64.82%	332	32.90%	12	1.19%	9	0.89%	2	0.20%	322	31.92%	1,009
Grant	314	70.40%	116	26.01%	8	1.79%	7	1.57%	1	0.22%	198	44.39%	446
Greeley	787	46.05%	877	51.32%	31	1.81%	10	0.59%	4	0.23%	-90	-5.27%	1,709
Hall	10,935	62.90%	6,079	34.96%	214	1.23%	108	0.62%	50	0.29%	4,856	27.94%	17,386
Hamilton	2,737	65.46%	1,337	31.98%	58	1.39%	36	0.86%	13	0.31%	1,400	33.48%	4,181
Harlan	1,325	58.76%	879	38.98%	29	1.29%	14	0.62%	8	0.35%	446	19.78%	2,255
Hayes	411	59.14%	267	38.42%	6	0.86%	7	1.01%	4	0.58%	144	20.72%	695
Hitchcock	898	51.85%	786	45.38%	35	2.02%	8	0.46%	5	0.29%	112	6.47%	1,732
Holt	3,389	64.21%	1,751	33.18%	73	1.38%	57	1.08%	8	0.15%	1,638	31.03%	5,278
Hooker	326	76.35%	98	22.95%	2	0.47%	1	0.23%	0	0.00%	228	53.40%	427
Howard	1,362	49.78%	1,316	48.10%	24	0.88%	28	1.02%	6	0.22%	46	1.68%	2,736
Jefferson	2,628	54.88%	2,068	43.18%	57	1.19%	27	0.56%	9	0.19%	560	11.70%	4,789
Johnson	1,298	52.87%	1,115	45.42%	29	1.18%	8	0.33%	5	0.20%	183	7.45%	2,455
Kearney	1,830	58.58%	1,219	39.02%	38	1.22%	22	0.70%	15	0.48%	611	19.56%	3,124
Keith	2,485	66.09%	1,139	30.29%	77	2.05%	42	1.12%	17	0.45%	1,346	35.80%	3,760
Keya Paha	405	60.72%	245	36.73%	7	1.05%	5	0.75%	5	0.75%	160	23.99%	667
Kimball	1,257	62.82%	696	34.78%	31	1.55%	11	0.55%	6	0.30%	561	28.04%	2,001
Knox	2,610	56.08%	1,922	41.30%	79	1.70%	22	0.47%	21	0.45%	688	14.78%	4,654
Lancaster	39,041	56.47%	28,301	40.94%	1,505	2.18%	149	0.22%	135	0.20%	10,740	15.53%	69,131
Lincoln	7,076	55.55%	5,355	42.04%	161	1.26%	113	0.89%	34	0.27%	1,721	13.51%	12,739
Logan	283	57.29%	196	39.68%	9	1.82%	6	1.21%	0	0.00%	87	17.61%	494
Loup	299	65.57%	140	30.70%	5	1.10%	12	2.63%	0	0.00%	159	34.87%	456
Madison	7,846	68.49%	3,433	29.97%	114	1.00%	50	0.44%	12	0.10%	4,413	38.52%	11,455
McPherson	221	66.37%	104	31.23%	2	0.60%	2	0.60%	4	1.20%	117	35.14%	333
Merrick	2,229	60.21%	1,360	36.74%	67	1.81%	26	0.70%	20	0.54%	869	23.47%	3,702
Morrill	1,351	56.79%	971	40.82%	37	1.56%	16	0.67%	4	0.17%	380	15.97%	2,379
Nance	1,121	53.05%	936	44.30%	36	1.70%	13	0.62%	7	0.33%	185	8.75%	2,113
Nemaha	2,093	59.06%	1,406	39.67%	27	0.76%	10	0.28%	8	0.23%	687	19.39%	3,544
Nuckolls	1,753	54.37%	1,424	44.17%	32	0.99%	9	0.28%	6	0.19%	329	10.20%	3,224
Otoe	3,715	59.56%	2,436	39.06%	63	1.01%	15	0.24%	8	0.13%	1,279	20.50%	6,237
Pawnee	990	52.86%	845	45.11%	26	1.39%	6	0.32%	6	0.32%	145	7.75%	1,873
Perkins	981	59.49%	622	37.72%	20	1.21%	25	1.52%	1	0.06%	359	21.77%	1,649
Phelps	3,210	71.19%	1,168	25.90%	55	1.22%	54	1.20%	22	0.49%	2,042	45.29%	4,509
Pierce	2,172	66.95%	1,004	30.95%	41	1.26%	18	0.55%	9	0.28%	1,168	36.00%	3,244
Platte	7,217	64.56%	3,693	33.04%	172	1.54%	66	0.59%	31	0.28%	3,524	31.52%	11,179
Polk	1,797	58.86%	1,190	38.98%	43	1.41%	16	0.52%	7	0.23%	607	19.88%	3,053
Red Willow	2,978	61.91%	1,722	35.80%	71	1.48%	24	0.50%	15	0.31%	1,256	26.11%	4,810
Richardson	3,119	55.43%	2,416	42.94%	46	0.82%	28	0.50%	18	0.32%	703	12.49%	5,627
Rock	732	72.55%	255	25.27%	14	1.39%	7	0.69%	1	0.10%	477	47.28%	1,009
Saline	2,330	41.15%	3,205	56.61%	59	1.04%	61	1.08%	7	0.12%	-875	-15.46%	5,662
Sarpy	11,917	60.44%	7,385	37.46%	288	1.46%	82	0.42%	44	0.22%	4,532	22.98%	19,716
Saunders	3,844	51.24%	3,507	46.75%	106	1.41%	33	0.44%	12	0.16%	337	4.49%	7,502
Scotts Bluff	6,887	60.05%	4,298	37.48%	171	1.49%	85	0.74%	27	0.24%	2,589	22.57%	11,468
Seward	3,220	54.12%	2,610	43.87%	70	1.18%	36	0.61%	14	0.24%	610	10.25%	5,950
Sheridan	2,003	67.83%	810	27.43%	73	2.47%	61	2.07%	6	0.20%	1,193	40.40%	2,953
Sherman	935	44.67%	1,078	51.51%	31	1.48%	43	2.05%	6	0.29%	-143	-6.84%	2,093
Sioux	532	60.25%	329	37.26%	16	1.81%	6	0.68%	0	0.00%	203	22.99%	883
Stanton	1,469	64.26%	764	33.42%	34	1.49%	11	0.48%	8	0.35%	705	30.84%	2,286
Thayer	1,994	59.35%	1,315	39.14%	40	1.19%	7	0.21%	4	0.12%	679	20.21%	3,360
Thomas	343	73.29%	103	22.01%	13	2.78%	7	1.50%	2	0.43%	240	51.28%	468
Thurston	1,290	53.91%	1,021	42.67%	46	1.92%	25	1.04%	11	0.46%	269	11.24%	2,393
Valley	1,587	57.31%	1,042	37.63%	36	1.30%	95	3.43%	9	0.33%	545	19.68%	2,769
Washington	3,799	62.17%	2,233	36.54%	54	0.88%	10	0.16%	15	0.25%	1,566	25.63%	6,111
Wayne	2,521	67.99%	1,089	29.37%	68	1.83%	20	0.54%	10	0.27%	1,432	38.62%	3,708
Webster	1,267	51.90%	1,130	46.29%	25	1.02%	8	0.33%	11	0.45%	137	5.61%	2,441
Wheeler	274	62.84%	146	33.49%	6	1.38%	9	2.06%	1	0.23%	128	29.35%	436
York	4,223	69.62%	1,665	27.45%	72	1.19%	100	1.65%	6	0.10%	2,558	42.17%	6,066
Totals	359,705	59.19%	233,692	38.46%	9,409	1.55%	3,380	0.56%	1,482	0.24%	126,013	20.73%	607,668

==== Counties that flipped from Republican to Democratic ====
- Butler
- Greeley
- Saline
- Sherman

=== By congressional district ===
Ford won all 3 congressional districts, including one which elected a Democrat.

district	Ford	Carter	Representative
1st	58.7%	41.3%	Charles Thone
2nd	60.2%	39.8%	John Y. McCollister
2nd	60.2%	39.8%	John J. Cavanaugh III
3rd	62.8%	37.2%	Virginia D. Smith

== See also ==
- United States presidential elections in Nebraska
