= Sherman County Courthouse (Nebraska) =

- U.S. National Register of Historic Places
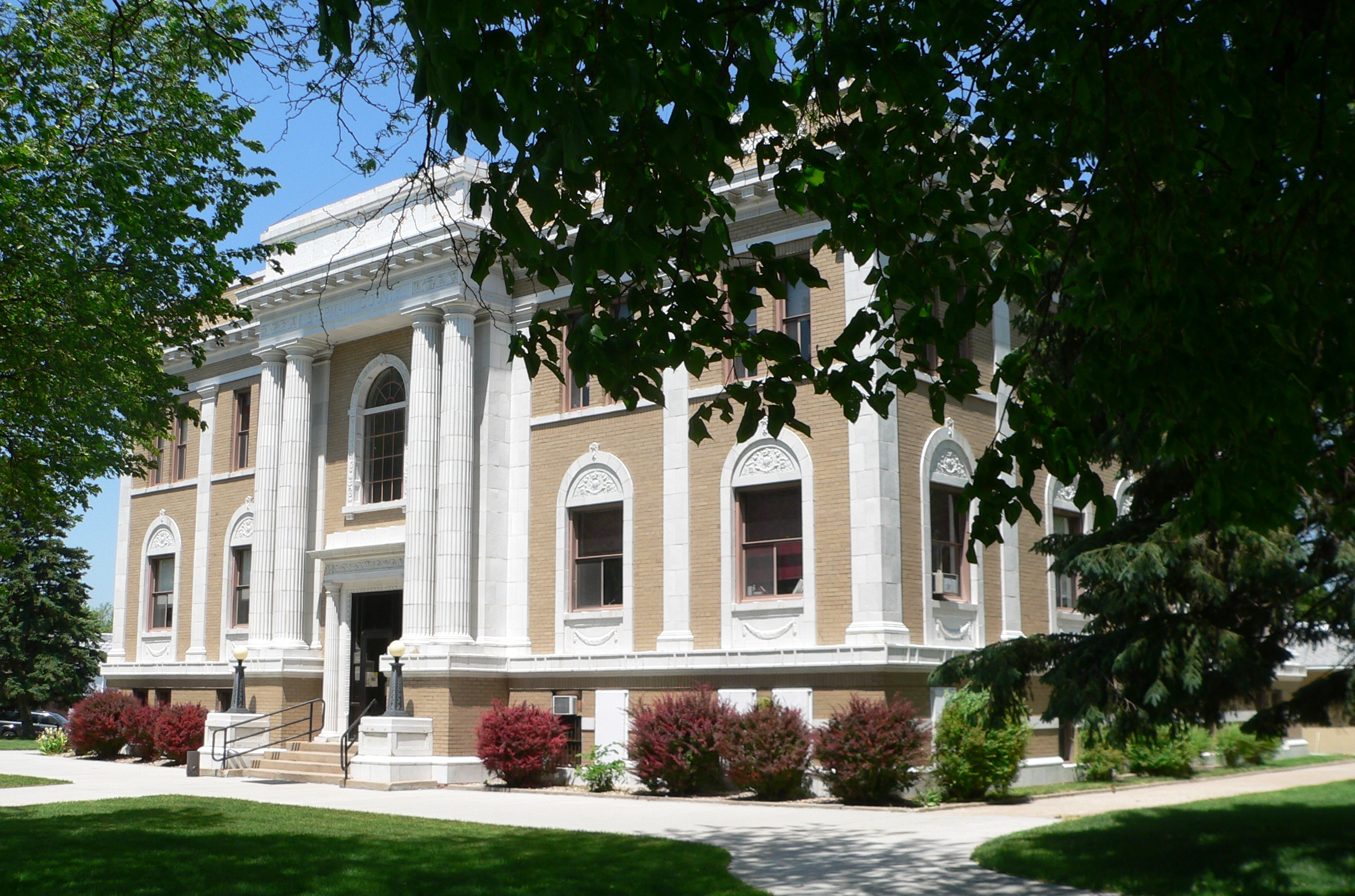
- View from the southeast

- Location within Nebraska Location within the United States
- Location: 630 O St., Loup City, Nebraska
- Coordinates: 41°16′31″N 98°57′58″W
- Area: 2 acres (0.81 ha)
- Built: 1920
- Architect: Henningson Engineering Co.
- Architectural style: Beaux Arts
- MPS: County Courthouses of Nebraska MPS
- NRHP reference No.: 89002225
- Added to NRHP: January 10, 1990

The Sherman County Courthouse, at 630 O St. in Loup City, Nebraska, is a historic Beaux Arts-style county courthouse that was built in 1920. Serving Sherman County still, it is a 60-by-74-foot (18 m × 23 m) building, topped by a cornice, and above that, mutules and a parapet.

It was listed on the National Register of Historic Places in 1990. It was deemed important as a good example of a "County Citadel"-type courthouse.

== History ==
The first Sherman County Courthouse, financed by $5,000 in bonds, was built in 1874, the year after the county was created. However, the courthouse burned down on the day of its dedication. A second courthouse was made of brick and was built in 1878, using some of the surviving wall of the first building. The Burlington and Missouri River Railroad donated $1,200 to the county for the construction of this second courthouse.

The third and current Sherman County Courthouse opened in 1921. It is tan brick with terra cotta trim and was financed by a special tax levy which began in 1916 and raised $102,640 by the time building's completion. The courthouse was designed by Henningson Engineering Co., and built by John Ohlsen and Sons, who also owned a brickyard.

The courthouse square was the scene of a riot on June 14, 1934 (the "Flag Day Riot"), and a subsequent trial. The riot marked the end of the Farm Holiday Movement in Nebraska. The Farm Holiday Movement was an agrarian farmer's movement in reaction to poor agricultural conditions in the 1930s. In the riot, the well-known national labor figure Ella Reeve "Mother" Bloor and other activists, including Communists, were arrested. Bloor recounted the affair in her 1940 autobiography, We Are Many, and "the arrests, trial, and subsequent appeals were reported nationally."
