= 1952 United States presidential election in Nebraska =

- November 4, 1952

All 6 Nebraska votes to the Electoral College

Nominee	Dwight D. Eisenhower	Adlai Stevenson
Party	Republican	Democratic
Home state	New York	Illinois
Running mate	Richard Nixon	John Sparkman
Electoral vote	6	0
Popular vote	421,603	188,057
Percentage	69.15%	30.85%
County results
Eisenhower
50–60%
60–70%
70–80%
80–90%
President before election
Harry S. Truman
Democratic
Elected President
Dwight D. Eisenhower
Republican

The 1952 United States presidential election in Nebraska took place on November 4, 1952, as part of the 1952 United States presidential election. Voters chose six representatives, or electors, to the Electoral College, who voted for president and vice president.

Nebraska was won by Columbia University President Dwight D. Eisenhower (R–New York), running with Senator Richard Nixon, with 69.15% of the popular vote, against Adlai Stevenson (D–Illinois), running with Senator John Sparkman, with 30.85% of the popular vote.

With 69.15% of the popular vote, Nebraska would be Eisenhower's fourth strongest state after Vermont, North Dakota and South Dakota

== Results ==
1952 United States presidential election in Nebraska
Party	Candidate	Votes	%
Republican	Dwight D. Eisenhower	421,603	69.15%
Democratic	Adlai Stevenson	188,057	30.85%
Total votes		609,660	100%

=== Results by county ===
County	Dwight D. Eisenhower Republican		Adlai Stevenson Democratic		Margin		Total votes cast
County	#	%	#	%	#	%	Total votes cast
Adams	9,033	70.69%	3,745	29.31%	5,288	41.38%	12,778
Antelope	4,377	80.39%	1,068	19.61%	3,309	60.78%	5,445
Arthur	307	83.20%	62	16.80%	245	66.40%	369
Banner	484	77.69%	139	22.31%	345	55.38%	623
Blaine	458	76.97%	137	23.03%	321	53.94%	595
Boone	3,453	72.91%	1,283	27.09%	2,170	45.82%	4,736
Box Butte	4,426	78.13%	1,239	21.87%	3,187	56.26%	5,665
Boyd	1,656	68.63%	757	31.37%	899	37.26%	2,413
Brown	1,950	78.22%	543	21.78%	1,407	56.44%	2,493
Buffalo	8,467	77.20%	2,501	22.80%	5,966	54.40%	10,968
Burt	4,154	76.97%	1,243	23.03%	2,911	53.94%	5,397
Butler	3,459	63.90%	1,954	36.10%	1,505	27.80%	5,413
Cass	5,088	66.16%	2,602	33.84%	2,486	32.32%	7,690
Cedar	4,753	77.03%	1,417	22.97%	3,336	54.06%	6,170
Chase	1,941	80.74%	463	19.26%	1,478	61.48%	2,404
Cherry	3,148	76.63%	960	23.37%	2,188	53.26%	4,108
Cheyenne	4,206	65.48%	2,217	34.52%	1,989	30.96%	6,423
Clay	3,559	76.14%	1,115	23.86%	2,444	52.28%	4,674
Colfax	3,332	69.56%	1,458	30.44%	1,874	39.12%	4,790
Cuming	4,557	80.63%	1,095	19.37%	3,462	61.26%	5,652
Custer	7,143	77.17%	2,113	22.83%	5,030	54.34%	9,256
Dakota	2,643	57.38%	1,963	42.62%	680	14.76%	4,606
Dawes	3,583	75.59%	1,157	24.41%	2,426	51.18%	4,740
Dawson	7,130	79.66%	1,820	20.34%	5,310	59.32%	8,950
Deuel	1,372	85.06%	241	14.94%	1,131	70.12%	1,613
Dixon	2,977	70.44%	1,249	29.56%	1,728	40.88%	4,226
Dodge	9,256	71.54%	3,682	28.46%	5,574	43.08%	12,938
Douglas	71,457	56.24%	55,591	43.76%	15,866	12.48%	127,048
Dundy	1,670	80.79%	397	19.21%	1,273	61.58%	2,067
Fillmore	3,603	74.77%	1,216	25.23%	2,387	49.54%	4,819
Franklin	2,438	75.88%	775	24.12%	1,663	51.76%	3,213
Frontier	1,980	77.07%	589	22.93%	1,391	54.14%	2,569
Furnas	3,464	77.29%	1,018	22.71%	2,446	54.58%	4,482
Gage	8,917	73.87%	3,154	26.13%	5,763	47.74%	12,071
Garden	1,457	81.03%	341	18.97%	1,116	62.06%	1,798
Garfield	1,042	80.46%	253	19.54%	789	60.92%	1,295
Gosper	1,017	77.63%	293	22.37%	724	55.26%	1,310
Grant	452	81.15%	105	18.85%	347	62.30%	557
Greeley	1,543	62.55%	924	37.45%	619	25.10%	2,467
Hall	10,435	69.37%	4,608	30.63%	5,827	38.74%	15,043
Hamilton	3,579	76.00%	1,130	24.00%	2,449	52.00%	4,709
Harlan	2,300	75.91%	730	24.09%	1,570	51.82%	3,030
Hayes	932	80.90%	220	19.10%	712	61.80%	1,152
Hitchcock	2,008	75.01%	669	24.99%	1,339	50.02%	2,677
Holt	5,088	74.67%	1,726	25.33%	3,362	49.34%	6,814
Hooker	411	85.09%	72	14.91%	339	70.18%	483
Howard	2,115	59.23%	1,456	40.77%	659	18.46%	3,571
Jefferson	4,941	76.12%	1,550	23.88%	3,391	52.24%	6,491
Johnson	2,787	74.02%	978	25.98%	1,809	48.04%	3,765
Kearney	2,422	72.26%	930	27.74%	1,492	44.52%	3,352
Keith	2,790	78.39%	769	21.61%	2,021	56.78%	3,559
Keya Paha	785	79.05%	208	20.95%	577	58.10%	993
Kimball	1,646	77.60%	475	22.40%	1,171	55.20%	2,121
Knox	4,840	75.47%	1,573	24.53%	3,267	50.94%	6,413
Lancaster	36,797	67.49%	17,728	32.51%	19,069	34.98%	54,525
Lincoln	8,292	69.00%	3,726	31.00%	4,566	38.00%	12,018
Logan	447	74.13%	156	25.87%	291	48.26%	603
Loup	507	82.31%	109	17.69%	398	64.62%	616
Madison	8,294	76.21%	2,589	23.79%	5,705	52.42%	10,883
McPherson	355	87.01%	53	12.99%	302	74.02%	408
Merrick	3,288	77.31%	965	22.69%	2,323	54.62%	4,253
Morrill	2,485	73.48%	897	26.52%	1,588	46.96%	3,382
Nance	2,112	73.77%	751	26.23%	1,361	47.54%	2,863
Nemaha	3,735	72.29%	1,432	27.71%	2,303	44.58%	5,167
Nuckolls	3,251	70.34%	1,371	29.66%	1,880	40.68%	4,622
Otoe	6,082	75.83%	1,939	24.17%	4,143	51.66%	8,021
Pawnee	2,432	75.02%	810	24.98%	1,622	50.04%	3,242
Perkins	1,637	78.40%	451	21.60%	1,186	56.80%	2,088
Phelps	3,822	77.98%	1,079	22.02%	2,743	55.96%	4,901
Pierce	3,234	78.06%	909	21.94%	2,325	56.12%	4,143
Platte	6,695	71.68%	2,645	28.32%	4,050	43.36%	9,340
Polk	3,008	76.66%	916	23.34%	2,092	53.32%	3,924
Red Willow	4,433	73.10%	1,631	26.90%	2,802	46.20%	6,064
Richardson	5,688	70.66%	2,362	29.34%	3,326	41.32%	8,050
Rock	1,226	82.12%	267	17.88%	959	64.24%	1,493
Saline	4,221	60.19%	2,792	39.81%	1,429	20.38%	7,013
Sarpy	3,649	59.06%	2,529	40.94%	1,120	18.12%	6,178
Saunders	5,525	65.10%	2,962	34.90%	2,563	30.20%	8,487
Scotts Bluff	9,674	72.94%	3,589	27.06%	6,085	45.88%	13,263
Seward	4,257	71.64%	1,685	28.36%	2,572	43.28%	5,942
Sheridan	3,512	80.68%	841	19.32%	2,671	61.36%	4,353
Sherman	1,784	60.47%	1,166	39.53%	618	20.94%	2,950
Sioux	1,093	78.46%	300	21.54%	793	56.92%	1,393
Stanton	1,983	74.69%	672	25.31%	1,311	49.38%	2,655
Thayer	3,992	75.92%	1,266	24.08%	2,726	51.84%	5,258
Thomas	490	80.33%	120	19.67%	370	60.66%	610
Thurston	1,918	62.03%	1,174	37.97%	744	24.06%	3,092
Valley	2,630	71.92%	1,027	28.08%	1,603	43.84%	3,657
Washington	3,770	69.11%	1,685	30.89%	2,085	38.22%	5,455
Wayne	3,338	79.40%	866	20.60%	2,472	58.80%	4,204
Webster	2,719	74.62%	925	25.38%	1,794	49.24%	3,644
Wheeler	455	66.33%	231	33.67%	224	32.66%	686
York	5,742	79.64%	1,468	20.36%	4,274	59.28%	7,210
Totals	421,603	69.15%	188,057	30.85%	233,546	38.30%	609,660

==== Counties that flipped from Democratic to Republican ====
- Butler
- Dakota
- Douglas
- Greeley
- Howard
- Saline
- Sarpy
- Saunders
- Sherman
- Thurston
- Wheeler

== See also ==
- United States presidential elections in Nebraska
