= 1980 United States presidential election in Nebraska =

- November 4, 1980

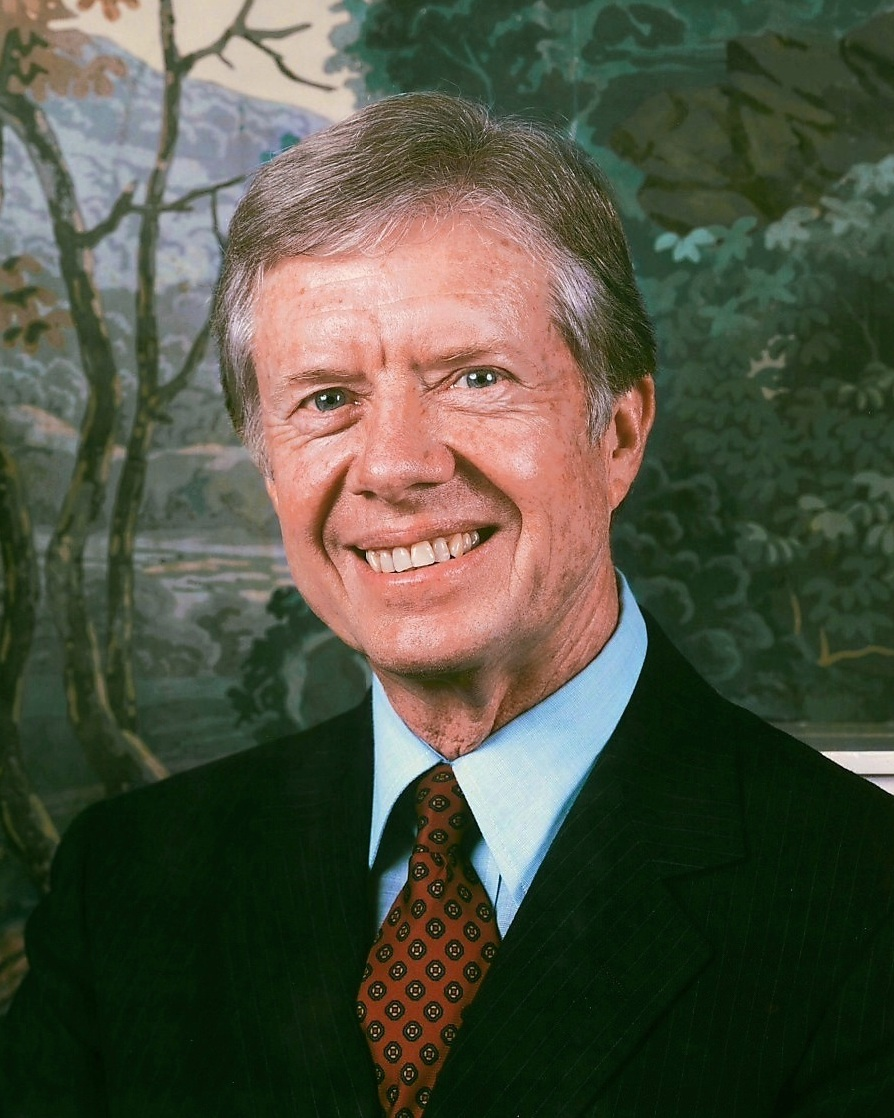

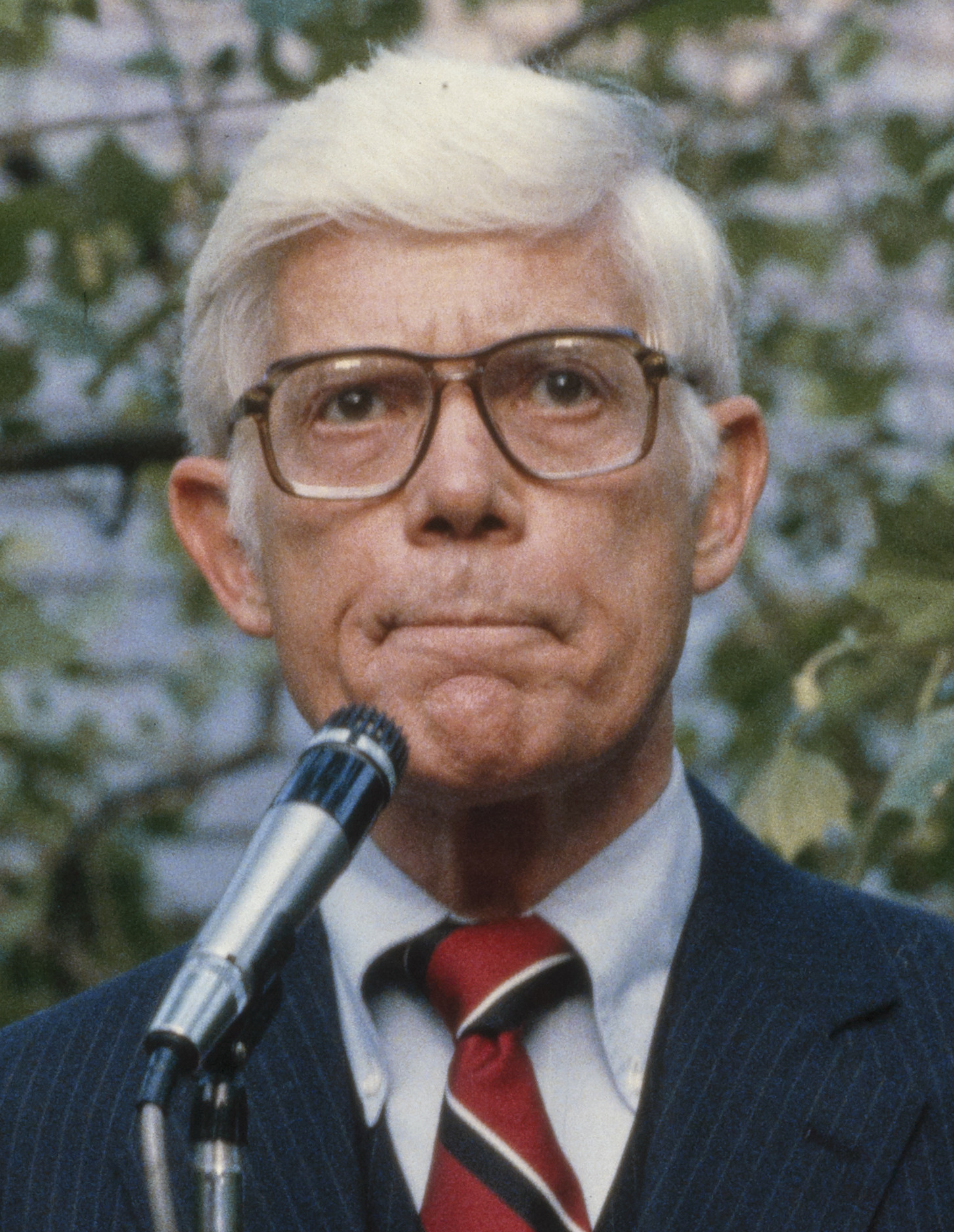
Nominee	Ronald Reagan	Jimmy Carter	John B. Anderson
Party	Republican	Democratic	Independent
Home state	California	Georgia	Illinois
Running mate	George H. W. Bush	Walter Mondale	Patrick Lucey
Electoral vote	5	0	0
Popular vote	419,937	166,851	44,993
Percentage	65.53%	26.04%	7.02%
County results
Reagan
50–60%
60–70%
70–80%
80–90%
90–100%
President before election
Jimmy Carter
Democratic
Elected President
Ronald Reagan
Republican

The 1980 United States presidential election in Nebraska took place on November 4, 1980. All 50 states and The District of Columbia were part of the 1980 United States presidential election. Voters chose five electors to the Electoral College, who voted for president and vice president.

Nebraska was won by former California Governor Ronald Reagan (R) by a 39.5-point landslide. With 65.53% of the popular vote, Nebraska was Reagan's third strongest state after Utah and Idaho.

== Results ==
1980 United States presidential election in Nebraska
Party	Candidate	Votes	%
Republican	Ronald Reagan	419,937	65.53%
Democratic	Jimmy Carter (incumbent)	166,851	26.04%
Independent	John B. Anderson	44,993	7.02%
Libertarian	Edward Clark	9,073	1.42%
Majority		253,086	39.49%
Total votes		640,854	100.00%
Turnout			≈55%

=== Results by county ===
County	Ronald Reagan Republican		Jimmy Carter Democratic		John B. Anderson Independent		Ed Clark Libertarian		Margin		Total votes cast
County	#	%	#	%	#	%	#	%	#	%	Total votes cast
Adams	8,500	65.52%	3,372	25.99%	885	6.82%	216	1.66%	5,128	39.53%	12,973
Antelope	3,192	78.68%	659	16.24%	150	3.70%	56	1.38%	2,533	62.44%	4,057
Arthur	245	76.80%	57	17.87%	9	2.82%	8	2.51%	188	58.93%	319
Banner	481	90.41%	33	6.20%	14	2.63%	4	0.75%	448	84.21%	532
Blaine	361	81.67%	63	14.25%	15	3.39%	3	0.68%	298	67.42%	442
Boone	2,598	72.11%	769	21.34%	176	4.88%	60	1.67%	1,829	50.77%	3,603
Box Butte	3,912	70.72%	1,208	21.84%	307	5.55%	105	1.90%	2,704	48.88%	5,532
Boyd	1,261	72.76%	376	21.70%	62	3.58%	34	1.96%	885	51.06%	1,733
Brown	1,615	77.38%	341	16.34%	105	5.03%	26	1.25%	1,274	61.04%	2,087
Buffalo	9,769	68.59%	3,167	22.24%	1,028	7.22%	279	1.96%	6,602	46.35%	14,243
Burt	2,806	72.08%	814	20.91%	232	5.96%	41	1.05%	1,992	51.17%	3,893
Butler	2,596	66.07%	1,112	28.30%	159	4.05%	62	1.58%	1,484	37.77%	3,929
Cass	5,193	66.42%	2,007	25.67%	487	6.23%	131	1.68%	3,186	40.75%	7,818
Cedar	3,259	67.09%	1,265	26.04%	273	5.62%	61	1.26%	1,994	41.05%	4,858
Chase	1,593	75.75%	324	15.41%	91	4.33%	95	4.52%	1,269	60.34%	2,103
Cherry	2,517	79.78%	489	15.50%	105	3.33%	44	1.39%	2,028	64.28%	3,155
Cheyenne	3,073	74.81%	776	18.89%	196	4.77%	63	1.53%	2,297	55.92%	4,108
Clay	2,739	71.63%	840	21.97%	190	4.97%	55	1.44%	1,899	49.66%	3,824
Colfax	3,259	73.17%	893	20.05%	230	5.16%	72	1.62%	2,366	53.12%	4,454
Cuming	4,006	78.07%	803	15.65%	267	5.20%	55	1.07%	3,203	62.42%	5,131
Custer	4,563	76.90%	1,011	17.04%	286	4.82%	74	1.25%	3,552	59.86%	5,934
Dakota	3,165	57.67%	1,930	35.17%	317	5.78%	76	1.38%	1,235	22.50%	5,488
Dawes	3,283	76.24%	705	16.37%	228	5.29%	90	2.09%	2,578	59.87%	4,306
Dawson	6,689	77.70%	1,463	16.99%	357	4.15%	100	1.16%	5,226	60.71%	8,609
Deuel	946	77.54%	192	15.74%	63	5.16%	19	1.56%	754	61.80%	1,220
Dixon	2,328	68.77%	822	24.28%	200	5.91%	35	1.03%	1,506	44.49%	3,385
Dodge	9,522	66.82%	3,564	25.01%	988	6.93%	176	1.24%	5,958	41.81%	14,250
Douglas	96,908	59.12%	51,668	31.52%	13,237	8.07%	2,117	1.29%	45,240	27.60%	163,930
Dundy	1,138	80.65%	192	13.61%	55	3.90%	26	1.84%	946	67.04%	1,411
Fillmore	2,435	65.00%	1,025	27.36%	221	5.90%	65	1.74%	1,410	37.64%	3,746
Franklin	1,675	73.95%	441	19.47%	109	4.81%	40	1.77%	1,234	54.48%	2,265
Frontier	1,346	79.27%	259	15.25%	84	4.95%	9	0.53%	1,087	64.02%	1,698
Furnas	2,483	78.28%	536	16.90%	113	3.56%	40	1.26%	1,947	61.38%	3,172
Gage	6,089	66.18%	2,259	24.55%	723	7.86%	130	1.41%	3,830	41.63%	9,201
Garden	1,297	82.09%	202	12.78%	63	3.99%	18	1.14%	1,095	69.31%	1,580
Garfield	811	73.19%	238	21.48%	43	3.88%	16	1.44%	573	51.71%	1,108
Gosper	783	76.09%	181	17.59%	47	4.57%	18	1.75%	602	58.50%	1,029
Grant	373	80.22%	76	16.34%	13	2.80%	3	0.65%	297	63.88%	465
Greeley	1,028	63.26%	495	30.46%	78	4.80%	24	1.48%	533	32.80%	1,625
Hall	12,166	68.13%	4,422	24.76%	987	5.53%	282	1.58%	7,744	43.37%	17,857
Hamilton	3,200	74.92%	778	18.22%	245	5.74%	48	1.12%	2,422	56.70%	4,271
Harlan	1,690	72.94%	486	20.98%	109	4.70%	32	1.38%	1,204	51.96%	2,317
Hayes	617	84.52%	82	11.23%	21	2.88%	10	1.37%	535	73.29%	730
Hitchcock	1,474	75.09%	329	16.76%	115	5.86%	45	2.29%	1,145	58.33%	1,963
Holt	4,495	77.00%	1,016	17.40%	245	4.20%	82	1.40%	3,479	59.60%	5,838
Hooker	386	81.78%	63	13.35%	18	3.81%	5	1.06%	323	68.43%	472
Howard	1,971	66.36%	789	26.57%	170	5.72%	40	1.35%	1,182	39.79%	2,970
Jefferson	3,090	67.59%	1,125	24.61%	297	6.50%	60	1.31%	1,965	42.98%	4,572
Johnson	1,719	67.02%	626	24.41%	182	7.10%	38	1.48%	1,093	42.61%	2,565
Kearney	2,512	71.16%	726	20.57%	227	6.43%	65	1.84%	1,786	50.59%	3,530
Keith	3,381	77.65%	710	16.31%	199	4.57%	64	1.47%	2,671	61.34%	4,354
Keya Paha	526	76.45%	130	18.90%	27	3.92%	5	0.73%	396	57.55%	688
Kimball	1,615	75.61%	385	18.02%	97	4.54%	39	1.83%	1,230	57.59%	2,136
Knox	3,404	71.08%	1,057	22.07%	245	5.12%	83	1.73%	2,347	49.01%	4,789
Lancaster	38,780	50.87%	27,162	35.63%	9,281	12.17%	1,010	1.32%	11,618	15.24%	76,233
Lincoln	9,643	66.60%	3,768	26.02%	843	5.82%	225	1.55%	5,875	40.58%	14,479
Logan	442	82.46%	71	13.25%	17	3.17%	6	1.12%	371	69.21%	536
Loup	368	78.30%	74	15.74%	21	4.47%	7	1.49%	294	62.56%	470
Madison	9,718	78.82%	1,926	15.62%	555	4.50%	130	1.05%	7,792	63.20%	12,329
McPherson	285	83.09%	49	14.29%	5	1.46%	4	1.17%	236	68.80%	343
Merrick	2,710	73.36%	712	19.27%	212	5.74%	60	1.62%	1,998	54.09%	3,694
Morrill	1,893	74.53%	512	20.16%	96	3.78%	39	1.54%	1,381	54.37%	2,540
Nance	1,442	67.29%	561	26.18%	100	4.67%	40	1.87%	881	41.11%	2,143
Nemaha	2,695	68.91%	930	23.78%	221	5.65%	65	1.66%	1,765	45.13%	3,911
Nuckolls	2,180	66.42%	899	27.39%	159	4.84%	44	1.34%	1,281	39.03%	3,282
Otoe	4,611	70.30%	1,471	22.43%	391	5.96%	86	1.31%	3,140	47.87%	6,559
Pawnee	1,418	71.15%	431	21.63%	122	6.12%	22	1.10%	987	49.52%	1,993
Perkins	1,342	76.16%	313	17.76%	83	4.71%	24	1.36%	1,029	58.40%	1,762
Phelps	3,465	77.95%	734	16.51%	192	4.32%	54	1.21%	2,731	61.44%	4,445
Pierce	2,938	80.74%	517	14.21%	155	4.26%	29	0.80%	2,421	66.53%	3,639
Platte	8,803	73.51%	2,389	19.95%	547	4.57%	236	1.97%	6,414	53.56%	11,975
Polk	2,206	75.14%	538	18.32%	149	5.07%	43	1.46%	1,668	56.82%	2,936
Red Willow	4,050	76.73%	899	17.03%	256	4.85%	73	1.38%	3,151	59.70%	5,278
Richardson	3,634	68.00%	1,350	25.26%	264	4.94%	96	1.80%	2,284	42.74%	5,344
Rock	855	80.74%	146	13.79%	39	3.68%	19	1.79%	709	66.95%	1,059
Saline	2,934	54.17%	1,908	35.23%	480	8.86%	94	1.74%	1,026	18.94%	5,416
Sarpy	15,552	67.03%	5,689	24.52%	1,686	7.27%	275	1.19%	9,863	42.51%	23,202
Saunders	5,223	66.06%	2,034	25.73%	516	6.53%	133	1.68%	3,189	40.33%	7,906
Scotts Bluff	9,504	71.73%	2,854	21.54%	681	5.14%	210	1.59%	6,650	50.19%	13,249
Seward	3,527	59.13%	1,803	30.23%	533	8.94%	102	1.71%	1,724	28.90%	5,965
Sheridan	2,749	84.04%	370	11.31%	121	3.70%	31	0.95%	2,379	72.73%	3,271
Sherman	1,254	63.65%	578	29.34%	116	5.89%	22	1.12%	676	34.31%	1,970
Sioux	760	81.55%	120	12.88%	33	3.54%	19	2.04%	640	68.67%	932
Stanton	1,945	78.87%	362	14.68%	118	4.79%	41	1.66%	1,583	64.19%	2,466
Thayer	2,514	68.88%	926	25.37%	178	4.88%	32	0.88%	1,588	43.51%	3,650
Thomas	306	76.12%	65	16.17%	26	6.47%	5	1.24%	241	59.95%	402
Thurston	1,454	61.71%	726	30.81%	140	5.94%	36	1.53%	728	30.90%	2,356
Valley	2,101	71.73%	655	22.36%	124	4.23%	49	1.67%	1,446	49.37%	2,929
Washington	4,570	70.71%	1,454	22.50%	358	5.54%	81	1.25%	3,116	48.21%	6,463
Wayne	2,844	72.53%	733	18.69%	301	7.68%	43	1.10%	2,111	53.84%	3,921
Webster	1,676	69.75%	547	22.76%	138	5.74%	42	1.75%	1,129	46.99%	2,403
Wheeler	374	74.65%	93	18.56%	22	4.39%	12	2.40%	281	56.09%	501
York	5,089	76.71%	1,131	17.05%	324	4.88%	90	1.36%	3,958	59.66%	6,634
Totals	419,937	65.53%	166,851	26.04%	44,993	7.02%	9,073	1.42%	253,086	39.49%	640,854

==== Counties that flipped from Democratic to Republican ====
- Butler
- Greeley
- Saline
- Sherman

== See also ==
- United States presidential elections in Nebraska
- Presidency of Ronald Reagan
