= 1960 United States presidential election in Nebraska =

- November 8, 1960

Nominee	Richard Nixon	John F. Kennedy
Party	Republican	Democratic
Home state	California	Massachusetts
Running mate	Henry Cabot Lodge Jr.	Lyndon B. Johnson
Electoral vote	6	0
Popular vote	380,553	232,542
Percentage	62.07%	37.93%
County results
Nixon
50–60%
60–70%
70–80%
80–90%
Kennedy
50–60%
President before election
Dwight D. Eisenhower
Republican
Elected President
John F. Kennedy
Democratic

The 1960 United States presidential election in Nebraska took place on November 8, 1960, as part of the 1960 United States presidential election. Voters chose six representatives, or electors, to the Electoral College, who voted for president and vice president.

Nebraska was won by incumbent Vice President Richard Nixon (R–California), running with former United States Ambassador to the United Nations Henry Cabot Lodge Jr., with 62.07% of the popular vote, against Senator John F. Kennedy (D–Massachusetts), running with Senator Lyndon B. Johnson, with 37.93% of the popular vote.

With 62.07% of the popular vote, Nebraska would prove to be Nixon's strongest state in the 1960 election.

== Primaries ==
=== Democratic primary ===
Kennedy won the state's Democratic primary.

While an effort by Stuart Symington or Hubert Humphrey could have, on paper, been successful in Nebraska's primary, Kennedy had managed to outmaneuver them, laying early groundwork which gave him a solid lead in the state.

Kennedy managed, in early 1958, to secure Bernard Boyle's support.

By the time that others such as Humphrey, Symington, and Johnson began to inquire with Boyle about their own prospective candidacies, they learned that they had an arrived a year too late.

Kennedy went in to win the primary, unchallenged. With the exception of Kennedy, all candidates were write-ins.

1960 Nebraska Democratic Presidential Primary Results
Party	Candidate	Votes	Percentage
Democratic	John F. Kennedy	80,408	88.7%
Democratic	Stuart Symington	4,083	4.5%
Democratic	Hubert Humphrey	3,202	3.5%
Democratic	Adlai Stevenson	1,368	1.5%
Democratic	Lyndon B. Johnson	962	1.1%
Democratic	Others	669	0.7%
Totals		90,692	100.00%

=== Republican primary ===
Nixon won the state's Republican primary. All candidates were write-ins.

1960 Nebraska Republican Presidential Primary Results
Party	Candidate	Votes	Percentage
Republican	Richard Nixon	74,356	93.8%
Republican	Nelson Rockefeller	2,028	2.6%
Republican	Barry Goldwater	1,068	1.3%
Republican	Others	1,805	2.3%
Totals		79,257	100.00%

== Results ==
1960 United States presidential election in Nebraska
Party	Candidate	Votes	%
Republican	Richard Nixon	380,553	62.07%
Democratic	John F. Kennedy	232,542	37.93%
Total votes		613,095	100%

=== Results by county ===
County	Richard Nixon Republican		John F. Kennedy Democratic		Margin		Total votes cast
County	#	%	#	%	#	%	Total votes cast
Adams	7,932	64.51%	4,364	35.49%	3,568	29.02%	12,296
Antelope	3,617	71.10%	1,470	28.90%	2,147	42.20%	5,087
Arthur	283	80.63%	68	19.37%	215	61.26%	351
Banner	424	66.77%	211	33.23%	213	33.54%	635
Blaine	420	78.80%	113	21.20%	307	57.60%	533
Boone	2,809	64.49%	1,547	35.51%	1,262	28.98%	4,356
Box Butte	3,157	62.60%	1,886	37.40%	1,271	25.20%	5,043
Boyd	1,393	64.46%	768	35.54%	625	28.92%	2,161
Brown	1,735	77.15%	514	22.85%	1,221	54.30%	2,249
Buffalo	7,595	66.12%	3,891	33.88%	3,704	32.24%	11,486
Burt	3,613	72.56%	1,366	27.44%	2,247	45.12%	4,979
Butler	2,253	45.11%	2,742	54.89%	-489	-9.78%	4,995
Cass	4,506	61.68%	2,799	38.32%	1,707	23.36%	7,305
Cedar	3,060	51.01%	2,939	48.99%	121	2.02%	5,999
Chase	1,482	69.28%	657	30.72%	825	38.56%	2,139
Cherry	2,695	72.08%	1,044	27.92%	1,651	44.16%	3,739
Cheyenne	2,814	52.17%	2,580	47.83%	234	4.34%	5,394
Clay	3,005	69.30%	1,331	30.70%	1,674	38.60%	4,336
Colfax	2,504	55.91%	1,975	44.09%	529	11.82%	4,479
Cuming	3,894	67.45%	1,879	32.55%	2,015	34.90%	5,773
Custer	5,716	70.87%	2,350	29.13%	3,366	41.74%	8,066
Dakota	2,977	56.13%	2,327	43.87%	650	12.26%	5,304
Dawes	3,106	70.83%	1,279	29.17%	1,827	41.66%	4,385
Dawson	6,480	73.07%	2,388	26.93%	4,092	46.14%	8,868
Deuel	1,276	76.22%	398	23.78%	878	52.44%	1,674
Dixon	2,713	66.22%	1,384	33.78%	1,329	32.44%	4,097
Dodge	9,638	67.21%	4,702	32.79%	4,936	34.42%	14,340
Douglas	72,005	52.92%	64,060	47.08%	7,945	5.84%	136,065
Dundy	1,245	71.92%	486	28.08%	759	43.84%	1,731
Fillmore	2,842	61.09%	1,810	38.91%	1,032	22.18%	4,652
Franklin	1,798	64.19%	1,003	35.81%	795	28.38%	2,801
Frontier	1,615	73.51%	582	26.49%	1,033	47.02%	2,197
Furnas	2,854	72.34%	1,091	27.66%	1,763	44.68%	3,945
Gage	7,754	66.76%	3,861	33.24%	3,893	33.52%	11,615
Garden	1,376	76.36%	426	23.64%	950	52.72%	1,802
Garfield	1,047	77.44%	305	22.56%	742	54.88%	1,352
Gosper	854	71.58%	339	28.42%	515	43.16%	1,193
Grant	410	76.35%	127	23.65%	283	52.70%	537
Greeley	960	43.18%	1,263	56.82%	-303	-13.64%	2,223
Hall	9,763	63.98%	5,496	36.02%	4,267	27.96%	15,259
Hamilton	3,249	72.65%	1,223	27.35%	2,026	45.30%	4,472
Harlan	1,766	66.42%	893	33.58%	873	32.84%	2,659
Hayes	699	71.33%	281	28.67%	418	42.66%	980
Hitchcock	1,634	70.67%	678	29.33%	956	41.34%	2,312
Holt	4,150	62.99%	2,438	37.01%	1,712	25.98%	6,588
Hooker	443	86.19%	71	13.81%	372	72.38%	514
Howard	1,676	52.47%	1,518	47.53%	158	4.94%	3,194
Jefferson	4,047	68.11%	1,895	31.89%	2,152	36.22%	5,942
Johnson	2,098	64.57%	1,151	35.43%	947	29.14%	3,249
Kearney	2,065	62.05%	1,263	37.95%	802	24.10%	3,328
Keith	2,680	68.88%	1,211	31.12%	1,469	37.76%	3,891
Keya Paha	646	72.83%	241	27.17%	405	45.66%	887
Kimball	2,152	67.93%	1,016	32.07%	1,136	35.86%	3,168
Knox	3,847	64.45%	2,122	35.55%	1,725	28.90%	5,969
Lancaster	37,725	62.57%	22,564	37.43%	15,161	25.14%	60,289
Lincoln	7,685	61.49%	4,812	38.51%	2,873	22.98%	12,497
Logan	391	70.58%	163	29.42%	228	41.16%	554
Loup	445	77.53%	129	22.47%	316	55.06%	574
Madison	8,350	73.25%	3,050	26.75%	5,300	46.50%	11,400
McPherson	303	81.89%	67	18.11%	236	63.78%	370
Merrick	2,744	68.98%	1,234	31.02%	1,510	37.96%	3,978
Morrill	2,020	62.75%	1,199	37.25%	821	25.50%	3,219
Nance	1,699	62.67%	1,012	37.33%	687	25.34%	2,711
Nemaha	3,031	68.76%	1,377	31.24%	1,654	37.52%	4,408
Nuckolls	2,441	60.86%	1,570	39.14%	871	21.72%	4,011
Otoe	5,057	66.54%	2,543	33.46%	2,514	33.08%	7,600
Pawnee	1,728	63.13%	1,009	36.87%	719	26.26%	2,737
Perkins	1,301	65.12%	697	34.88%	604	30.24%	1,998
Phelps	3,795	75.19%	1,252	24.81%	2,543	50.38%	5,047
Pierce	2,963	72.80%	1,107	27.20%	1,856	45.60%	4,070
Platte	6,129	58.28%	4,387	41.72%	1,742	16.56%	10,516
Polk	2,397	66.94%	1,184	33.06%	1,213	33.88%	3,581
Red Willow	3,890	66.93%	1,922	33.07%	1,968	33.86%	5,812
Richardson	4,481	62.66%	2,670	37.34%	1,811	25.32%	7,151
Rock	1,084	81.08%	253	18.92%	831	62.16%	1,337
Saline	2,881	44.99%	3,523	55.01%	-642	-10.02%	6,404
Sarpy	4,672	55.30%	3,777	44.70%	895	10.60%	8,449
Saunders	4,702	56.94%	3,556	43.06%	1,146	13.88%	8,258
Scotts Bluff	8,728	60.72%	5,646	39.28%	3,082	21.44%	14,374
Seward	3,588	63.14%	2,095	36.86%	1,493	26.28%	5,683
Sheridan	2,870	71.50%	1,144	28.50%	1,726	43.00%	4,014
Sherman	1,131	44.21%	1,427	55.79%	-296	-11.58%	2,558
Sioux	745	64.22%	415	35.78%	330	28.44%	1,160
Stanton	1,680	66.22%	857	33.78%	823	32.44%	2,537
Thayer	3,202	67.38%	1,550	32.62%	1,652	34.76%	4,752
Thomas	420	74.87%	141	25.13%	279	49.74%	561
Thurston	1,757	57.19%	1,315	42.81%	442	14.38%	3,072
Valley	2,045	62.10%	1,248	37.90%	797	24.20%	3,293
Washington	3,772	69.01%	1,694	30.99%	2,078	38.02%	5,466
Wayne	3,274	76.16%	1,025	23.84%	2,249	52.32%	4,299
Webster	2,026	64.75%	1,103	35.25%	923	29.50%	3,129
Wheeler	424	63.95%	239	36.05%	185	27.90%	663
York	5,205	74.69%	1,764	25.31%	3,441	49.38%	6,969
Totals	380,553	62.07%	232,542	37.93%	148,011	24.14%	613,095

==== Counties that flipped from Republican to Democratic ====
- Butler
- Greeley
- Sherman

== See also ==
- United States presidential elections in Nebraska
