= 1904 United States presidential election in Nebraska =

- November 8, 1904
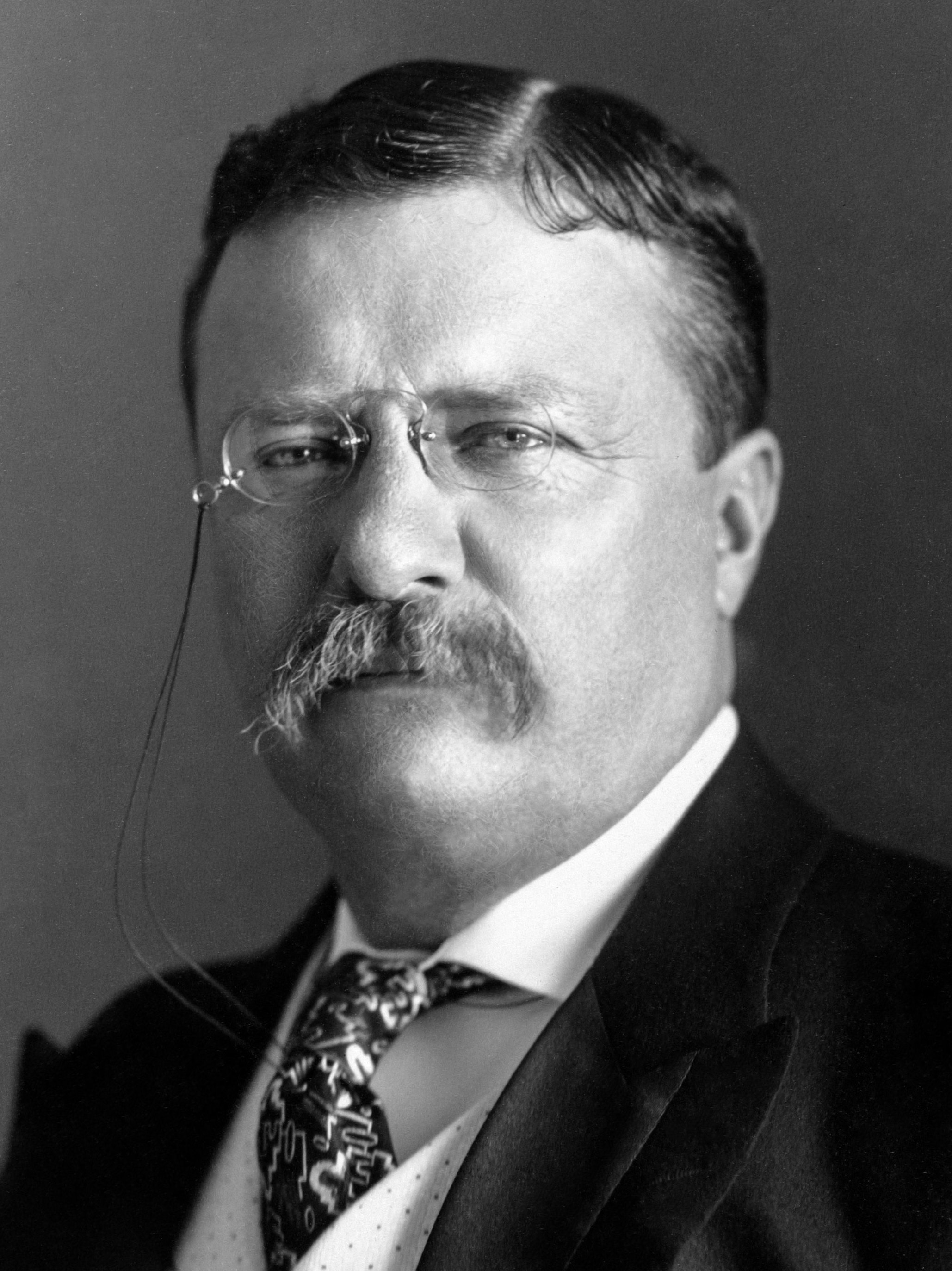

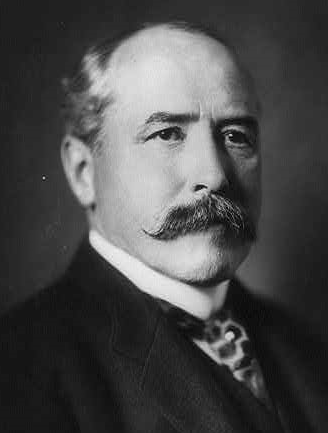

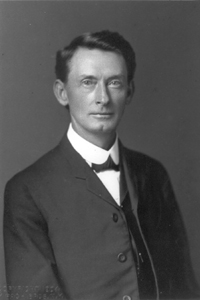
Nominee	Theodore Roosevelt	Alton B. Parker	Thomas E. Watson
Party	Republican	Democratic	Populist
Home state	New York	New York	Georgia
Running mate	Charles W. Fairbanks	Henry G. Davis	Thomas Tibbles
Electoral vote	8	0	0
Popular vote	138,558	52,921	20,518
Percentage	61.38%	23.44%	9.09%
County results
Roosevelt
50–60%
60–70%
70–80%
80–90%
President before election
Theodore Roosevelt
Republican
Elected President
Theodore Roosevelt
Republican

The 1904 United States presidential election in Nebraska took place on November 8, 1904. All contemporary 45 states were part of the 1904 United States presidential election. Voters chose eight electors to the Electoral College, which selected the president and vice president.

Nebraska was won by the Republican nominees, incumbent President Theodore Roosevelt of New York and his running mate Charles W. Fairbanks of Indiana. They defeated the Democratic nominees, former Chief Judge of New York Court of Appeals Alton B. Parker and his running mate, former US Senator Henry G. Davis of West Virginia. Roosevelt won the state by a margin of 37.94 percentage points.

== Results ==
1904 United States presidential election in Nebraska
Party	Candidate	Votes	Percentage	Electoral votes
Republican	Theodore Roosevelt (incumbent)	138,558	61.38%	8
Democratic	Alton B. Parker	52,921	23.44%	0
Populist	Thomas E. Watson	20,518	9.09%	0
Social Democratic	Eugene V. Debs	7,412	3.28%	0
Prohibition	Silas C. Swallow	6,323	2.80%	0
Totals		225,732	100.00%	8
Voter turnout				—

=== Results by county ===
County	Theodore Roosevelt Republican		Alton B. Parker Democratic		Thomas E. Watson Populist		Eugene V. Debs Socialist		Silas C. Swallow Prohibition		Margin		Total votes cast
County	#	%	#	%	#	%	#	%	#	%	#	%	Total votes cast
Adams	2,315	60.02%	898	23.28%	467	12.11%	58	1.50%	119	3.09%	1,417	36.74%	3,857
Antelope	1,813	64.73%	353	12.60%	509	18.17%	27	0.96%	99	3.53%	1,304 (Note: In this county where Watson ran second ahead of Parker, margin given is Roosevelt vote minus Watson vote and percentage margin Roosevelt percentage margin Roosevelt percentage minus Watson percentage.)	46.55%	2,801
Banner	155	81.58%	18	9.47%	9	4.74%	3	1.58%	5	2.63%	137	72.11%	190
Blaine	127	70.17%	34	18.78%	17	9.39%	0	0.00%	3	1.66%	93	51.38%	181
Boone	1,823	63.72%	471	16.46%	428	14.96%	15	0.52%	124	4.33%	1,352	47.26%	2,861
Box Butte	668	66.73%	217	21.68%	71	7.09%	25	2.50%	20	2.00%	451	45.05%	1,001
Boyd	1,233	64.35%	328	17.12%	247	12.89%	61	3.18%	47	2.45%	905	47.23%	1,916
Brown	587	70.81%	134	16.16%	74	8.93%	26	3.14%	8	0.97%	453	54.64%	829
Buffalo	2,554	62.07%	731	17.76%	642	15.60%	94	2.28%	94	2.28%	1,823	44.30%	4,115
Burt	2,081	72.23%	528	18.33%	171	5.94%	18	0.62%	83	2.88%	1,553	53.90%	2,881
Butler	1,723	50.81%	1,278	37.69%	281	8.29%	12	0.35%	97	2.86%	445	13.12%	3,391
Cass	2,711	58.76%	1,466	31.77%	196	4.25%	87	1.89%	154	3.34%	1,245	26.98%	4,614
Cedar	1,797	59.37%	1,023	33.80%	148	4.89%	28	0.93%	31	1.02%	774	25.57%	3,027
Chase	329	62.43%	111	21.06%	74	14.04%	0	0.00%	13	2.47%	218	41.37%	527
Cherry	978	66.94%	325	22.25%	86	5.89%	28	1.92%	44	3.01%	653	44.70%	1,461
Cheyenne	681	65.92%	267	25.85%	30	2.90%	20	1.94%	35	3.39%	414	40.08%	1,033
Clay	2,118	59.48%	701	19.69%	576	16.18%	55	1.54%	111	3.12%	1,417	39.79%	3,561
Colfax	1,180	53.03%	768	34.52%	149	6.70%	51	2.29%	77	3.46%	412	18.52%	2,225
Cuming	1,490	52.69%	1,244	43.99%	61	2.16%	8	0.28%	25	0.88%	246	8.70%	2,828
Custer	2,658	59.61%	509	11.42%	1,058	23.73%	116	2.60%	118	2.65%	1,600	35.88%	4,459
Dakota	855	63.52%	399	29.64%	28	2.08%	30	2.23%	34	2.53%	456	33.88%	1,346
Dawes	818	66.45%	247	20.06%	81	6.58%	62	5.04%	23	1.87%	571	46.39%	1,231
Dawson	1,712	61.52%	457	16.42%	437	15.70%	48	1.72%	129	4.64%	1,255	45.10%	2,783
Deuel	399	72.15%	109	19.71%	36	6.51%	5	0.90%	4	0.72%	290	52.44%	553
Dixon	1,524	64.80%	571	24.28%	141	5.99%	34	1.45%	82	3.49%	953	40.52%	2,352
Dodge	2,789	59.38%	1,646	35.04%	87	1.85%	82	1.75%	93	1.98%	1,143	24.33%	4,697
Douglas	15,248	57.87%	6,831	25.93%	279	1.06%	3,736	14.18%	255	0.97%	8,417	31.94%	26,349
Dundy	395	65.61%	92	15.28%	94	15.61%	11	1.83%	10	1.66%	301	50.00%	602
Fillmore	1,980	56.70%	837	23.97%	579	16.58%	51	1.46%	45	1.29%	1,143	32.73%	3,492
Franklin	1,269	58.56%	471	21.74%	362	16.71%	19	0.88%	46	2.12%	798	36.83%	2,167
Frontier	993	61.64%	190	11.79%	353	21.91%	46	2.86%	29	1.80%	640	39.73%	1,611
Furnas	1,569	61.72%	393	15.46%	479	18.84%	23	0.90%	78	3.07%	1,090	42.88%	2,542
Gage	4,304	69.87%	1,330	21.59%	196	3.18%	92	1.49%	238	3.86%	2,974	48.28%	6,160
Garfield	406	67.44%	84	13.95%	94	15.61%	14	2.33%	4	0.66%	312	51.83%	602
Gosper	548	57.87%	154	16.26%	212	22.39%	9	0.95%	24	2.53%	336	35.48%	947
Grant	113	66.86%	49	28.99%	6	3.55%	1	0.59%	0	0.00%	64	37.87%	169
Greeley	836	54.25%	447	29.01%	185	12.01%	53	3.44%	20	1.30%	389	25.24%	1,541
Hall	2,508	65.69%	817	21.40%	271	7.10%	129	3.38%	93	2.44%	1,691	44.29%	3,818
Hamilton	1,845	61.38%	551	18.33%	410	13.64%	39	1.30%	161	5.36%	1,294	43.05%	3,006
Harlan	1,178	57.77%	299	14.66%	350	17.17%	55	2.70%	157	7.70%	828	40.61%	2,039
Hayes	335	62.97%	110	20.68%	48	9.02%	32	6.02%	7	1.32%	225	42.29%	532
Hitchcock	598	61.08%	166	16.96%	190	19.41%	15	1.53%	10	1.02%	408	41.68%	979
Holt	1,740	52.92%	646	19.65%	706	21.47%	74	2.25%	122	3.71%	1,034	31.45%	3,288
Hooker	72	69.23%	22	21.15%	8	7.69%	0	0.00%	2	1.92%	50	48.08%	104
Howard	1,259	56.97%	476	21.54%	401	18.14%	32	1.45%	42	1.90%	783	35.43%	2,210
Jefferson	2,067	66.63%	659	21.24%	122	3.93%	128	4.13%	126	4.06%	1,408	45.39%	3,102
Johnson	1,611	63.45%	642	25.29%	150	5.91%	17	0.67%	119	4.69%	969	38.16%	2,539
Kearney	1,235	57.98%	396	18.59%	384	18.03%	32	1.50%	83	3.90%	839	39.39%	2,130
Keith	263	60.18%	89	20.37%	75	17.16%	8	1.83%	2	0.46%	174	39.82%	437
Keya Paha	448	62.14%	97	13.45%	129	17.89%	37	5.13%	10	1.39%	319	44.24%	721
Kimball	143	80.34%	20	11.24%	10	5.62%	3	1.69%	2	1.12%	123	69.10%	178
Knox	2,163	61.50%	864	24.57%	328	9.33%	71	2.02%	91	2.59%	1,299	36.93%	3,517
Lancaster	8,167	70.77%	1,981	17.16%	663	5.74%	178	1.54%	552	4.78%	6,186	53.60%	11,541
Lincoln	1,449	63.89%	328	14.46%	223	9.83%	218	9.61%	50	2.20%	1,121	49.43%	2,268
Logan	100	55.56%	22	12.22%	34	18.89%	20	11.11%	4	2.22%	66	36.67%	180
Loup	223	66.57%	23	6.87%	69	20.60%	20	5.97%	0	0.00%	154	45.97%	335
Madison	2,210	62.82%	1,049	29.82%	157	4.46%	49	1.39%	53	1.51%	1,161	33.00%	3,518
McPherson	108	80.60%	12	8.96%	5	3.73%	8	5.97%	1	0.75%	96	71.64%	134
Merrick	1,275	61.09%	400	19.17%	242	11.60%	15	0.72%	155	7.43%	875	41.93%	2,087
Nance	1,198	66.30%	311	17.21%	224	12.40%	12	0.66%	62	3.43%	887	49.09%	1,807
Nemaha	1,946	60.64%	786	24.49%	290	9.04%	73	2.27%	114	3.55%	1,160	36.15%	3,209
Nuckolls	1,615	60.99%	585	22.09%	385	14.54%	17	0.64%	46	1.74%	1,030	38.90%	2,648
Otoe	2,616	58.85%	1,420	31.95%	168	3.78%	137	3.08%	104	2.34%	1,196	26.91%	4,445
Pawnee	1,739	68.38%	562	22.10%	91	3.58%	42	1.65%	109	4.29%	1,177	46.28%	2,543
Perkins	179	54.74%	57	17.43%	85	25.99%	2	0.61%	4	1.22%	94	28.75%	327
Phelps	1,567	67.86%	219	9.48%	393	17.02%	20	0.87%	110	4.76%	1,174	50.84%	2,309
Pierce	1,122	58.65%	616	32.20%	97	5.07%	39	2.04%	39	2.04%	506	26.45%	1,913
Platte	1,947	52.64%	1,511	40.85%	158	4.27%	22	0.59%	61	1.65%	436	11.79%	3,699
Polk	1,235	51.91%	239	10.05%	690	29.00%	36	1.51%	179	7.52%	545	22.91%	2,379
Red Willow	1,373	66.30%	306	14.78%	257	12.41%	74	3.57%	61	2.95%	1,067	51.52%	2,071
Richardson	2,554	56.83%	1,664	37.03%	135	3.00%	73	1.62%	68	1.51%	890	19.80%	4,494
Rock	498	70.64%	138	19.57%	39	5.53%	7	0.99%	23	3.26%	360	51.06%	705
Saline	2,390	61.38%	1,108	28.45%	245	6.29%	38	0.98%	113	2.90%	1,282	32.92%	3,894
Sarpy	998	53.68%	675	36.31%	49	2.64%	83	4.46%	54	2.90%	323	17.37%	1,859
Saunders	2,880	60.14%	1,091	22.78%	582	12.15%	56	1.17%	180	3.76%	1,789	37.36%	4,789
Scotts Bluff	530	67.86%	103	13.19%	34	4.35%	87	11.14%	27	3.46%	427	54.67%	781
Seward	2,243	61.64%	1,027	28.22%	279	7.67%	10	0.27%	80	2.20%	1,216	33.42%	3,639
Sheridan	673	61.57%	171	15.65%	182	16.65%	27	2.47%	40	3.66%	491	44.92%	1,093
Sherman	809	56.30%	140	9.74%	423	29.44%	44	3.06%	21	1.46%	386	26.86%	1,437
Sioux	247	62.06%	111	27.89%	24	6.03%	3	0.75%	13	3.27%	136	34.17%	398
Stanton	895	59.87%	513	34.31%	57	3.81%	9	0.60%	21	1.40%	382	25.55%	1,495
Thayer	1,930	62.48%	812	26.29%	209	6.77%	37	1.20%	101	3.27%	1,118	36.19%	3,089
Thomas	86	60.56%	40	28.17%	11	7.75%	3	2.11%	2	1.41%	46	32.39%	142
Thurston	757	56.41%	539	40.16%	20	1.49%	20	1.49%	6	0.45%	218	16.24%	1,342
Valley	1,133	63.94%	219	12.36%	357	20.15%	13	0.73%	50	2.82%	776	43.79%	1,772
Washington	1,868	64.39%	795	27.40%	104	3.58%	96	3.31%	38	1.31%	1,073	36.99%	2,901
Wayne	1,453	68.25%	549	25.79%	71	3.33%	26	1.22%	30	1.41%	904	42.46%	2,129
Webster	1,585	61.84%	424	16.54%	446	17.40%	19	0.74%	89	3.47%	1,139	44.44%	2,563
Wheeler	187	52.97%	56	15.86%	69	19.55%	37	10.48%	4	1.13%	118	33.43%	353
York	2,529	64.16%	754	19.13%	426	10.81%	22	0.56%	211	5.35%	1,775	45.03%	3,942
Totals	138,558	61.38%	52,921	23.44%	20,518	9.09%	7,412	3.28%	6,323	2.80%	85,637	37.94%	225,732

== See also ==
- United States presidential elections in Nebraska
