= Elections in Nebraska =

The number of elections in Nebraska varies by year. Nebraska has a gubernatorial election every four years. Members of the state's United States congressional delegation run for election or re-election at the times set out in the United States Constitution. Primary elections assist in choosing political parties' nominees for various positions. On a regional basis, elections also cover municipal issues. In addition, a special election can occur within certain timeframes, as outlined in Nebraska state law.

Omaha and Lincoln both have regularly scheduled odd-numbered year elections, with Omaha holding elections for mayor and city council in the year following a presidential election, and Lincoln holding elections each odd-numbered year.

In a 2020 study, Nebraska was ranked as the 22nd easiest state for citizens to vote in.

United States presidential election results for Nebraska
| Year | Republican | | Democratic | | Third party(ies) | |
| Year | No. | % | No. | % | No. | % |
|---|---|---|---|---|---|---|
| 1868 | 9,772 | 63.91% | 5,519 | 36.09% | 0 | 0.00% |
| 1872 | 18,329 | 70.68% | 7,603 | 29.32% | 0 | 0.00% |
| 1876 | 31,915 | 64.70% | 17,413 | 35.30% | 0 | 0.00% |
| 1880 | 54,979 | 62.87% | 28,523 | 32.62% | 3,950 | 4.52% |
| 1884 | 76,912 | 57.31% | 54,391 | 40.53% | 2,899 | 2.16% |
| 1888 | 108,425 | 53.51% | 80,552 | 39.75% | 13,655 | 6.74% |
| 1892 | 87,213 | 43.56% | 24,943 | 12.46% | 88,036 | 43.98% |
| 1896 | 103,064 | 46.18% | 115,007 | 51.53% | 5,111 | 2.29% |
| 1900 | 121,835 | 50.46% | 114,013 | 47.22% | 5,582 | 2.31% |
| 1904 | 138,558 | 61.38% | 52,921 | 23.44% | 34,253 | 15.17% |
| 1908 | 126,997 | 47.60% | 131,099 | 49.14% | 8,703 | 3.26% |
| 1912 | 54,226 | 21.74% | 109,008 | 43.69% | 86,249 | 34.57% |
| 1916 | 117,771 | 40.99% | 158,827 | 55.28% | 10,717 | 3.73% |
| 1920 | 247,498 | 64.66% | 119,608 | 31.25% | 15,637 | 4.09% |
| 1924 | 218,585 | 47.09% | 137,289 | 29.58% | 108,299 | 23.33% |
| 1928 | 345,745 | 63.19% | 197,959 | 36.18% | 3,440 | 0.63% |
| 1932 | 201,177 | 35.29% | 359,082 | 62.98% | 9,878 | 1.73% |
| 1936 | 247,731 | 40.74% | 347,445 | 57.14% | 12,847 | 2.11% |
| 1940 | 352,201 | 57.19% | 263,677 | 42.81% | 0 | 0.00% |
| 1944 | 329,880 | 58.58% | 233,246 | 41.42% | 0 | 0.00% |
| 1948 | 264,774 | 54.15% | 224,165 | 45.85% | 1 | 0.00% |
| 1952 | 421,603 | 69.15% | 188,057 | 30.85% | 0 | 0.00% |
| 1956 | 378,108 | 65.51% | 199,029 | 34.49% | 0 | 0.00% |
| 1960 | 380,553 | 62.07% | 232,542 | 37.93% | 0 | 0.00% |
| 1964 | 276,847 | 47.39% | 307,307 | 52.61% | 0 | 0.00% |
| 1968 | 321,163 | 59.82% | 170,784 | 31.81% | 44,904 | 8.36% |
| 1972 | 406,298 | 70.50% | 169,991 | 29.50% | 0 | 0.00% |
| 1976 | 359,705 | 59.19% | 233,692 | 38.46% | 14,271 | 2.35% |
| 1980 | 419,937 | 65.53% | 166,851 | 26.04% | 54,066 | 8.44% |
| 1984 | 460,054 | 70.55% | 187,866 | 28.81% | 4,170 | 0.64% |
| 1988 | 398,447 | 60.15% | 259,646 | 39.20% | 4,279 | 0.65% |
| 1992 | 344,346 | 46.58% | 217,344 | 29.40% | 177,593 | 24.02% |
| 1996 | 363,467 | 53.65% | 236,761 | 34.95% | 77,187 | 11.39% |
| 2000 | 433,862 | 62.25% | 231,780 | 33.25% | 31,377 | 4.50% |
| 2004 | 512,814 | 65.90% | 254,328 | 32.68% | 11,044 | 1.42% |
| 2008 | 452,979 | 56.53% | 333,319 | 41.60% | 14,983 | 1.87% |
| 2012 | 475,064 | 59.80% | 302,081 | 38.03% | 17,234 | 2.17% |
| 2016 | 495,961 | 58.75% | 284,494 | 33.70% | 63,777 | 7.55% |
| 2020 | 556,846 | 58.22% | 374,583 | 39.17% | 24,954 | 2.61% |
| 2024 | 564,816 | 59.32% | 369,995 | 38.86% | 17,371 | 1.82% |

== Voter qualifications ==
To register to vote in Nebraska, each applicant must be a citizen of the United States, a resident of the Nebraska county in which they are registering, and at least 18 years old by the first Tuesday after the first Monday in November. Citizens are eligible to register to vote on January 1 of the year they will turn 18 before the November general election. Individuals who have been convicted of a felony are ineligible to register to vote until the terms of their sentence have been completed, and individuals who have been declared mentally incompetent by a court are ineligible to register to vote.

== Recent elections ==
=== Gubernatorial ===
The Governor of Nebraska is elected every four years, and is restricted to two terms.

- 2022 gubernatorial election
- 2018 gubernatorial election
- 2014 gubernatorial election
- 2010 gubernatorial election
- 2006 gubernatorial election
- 2002 gubernatorial election

=== Senatorial ===
- 2024 United States Senate election in Nebraska
- 2024 United States Senate special election in Nebraska
- 2020 United States Senate election in Nebraska
- 2018 United States Senate election in Nebraska
- 2014 United States Senate election in Nebraska
- 2012 United States Senate election in Nebraska
- 2008 United States Senate election in Nebraska

== See also ==
- 2026 Nebraska elections
  - 2026 Nebraska Public Service Commission election
- United States presidential elections in Nebraska
- Elections in the United States
