= 1872 United States presidential election in Massachusetts =

- November 5, 1872
- Turnout: 62.0% ▼4.9 pp
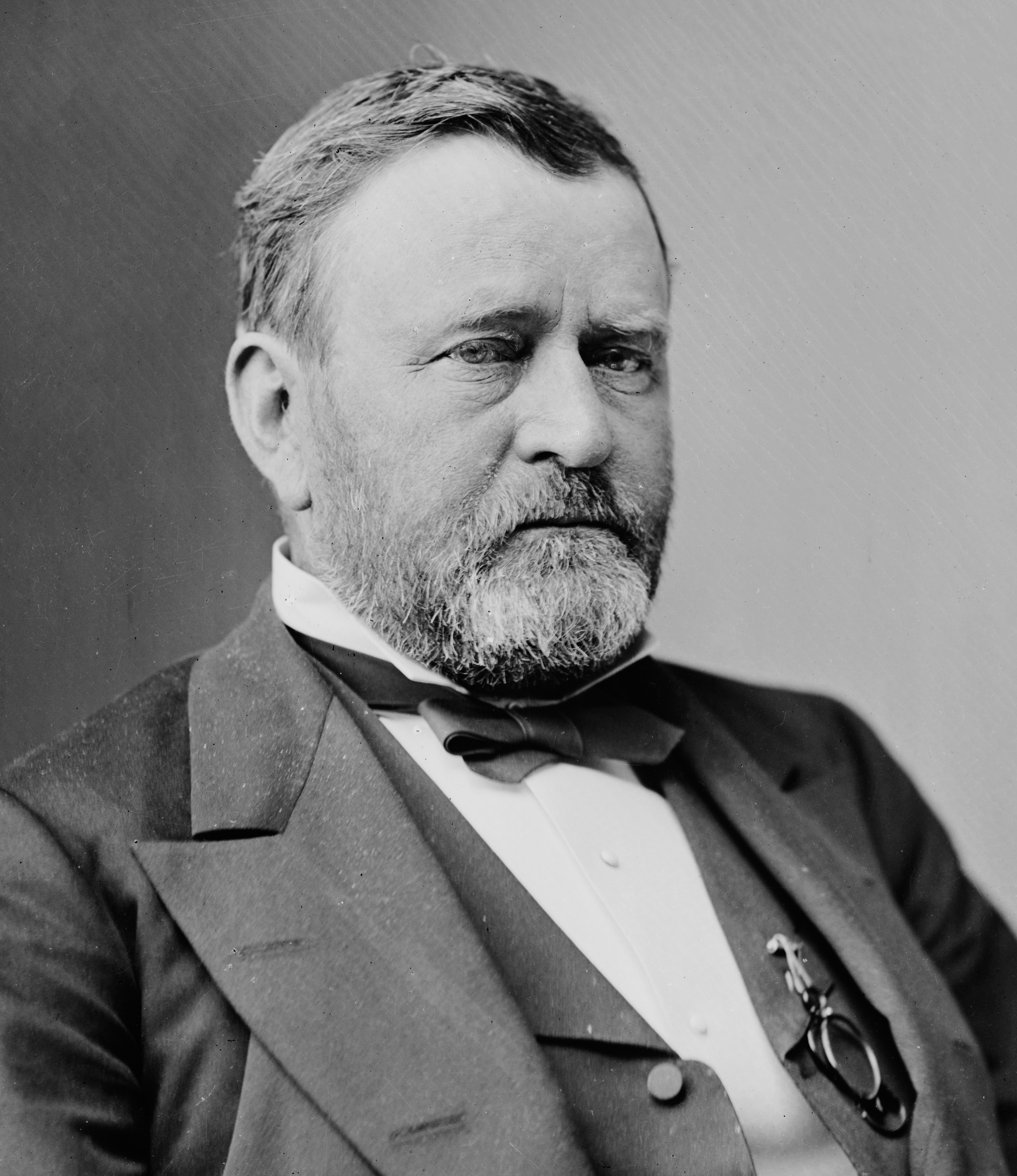

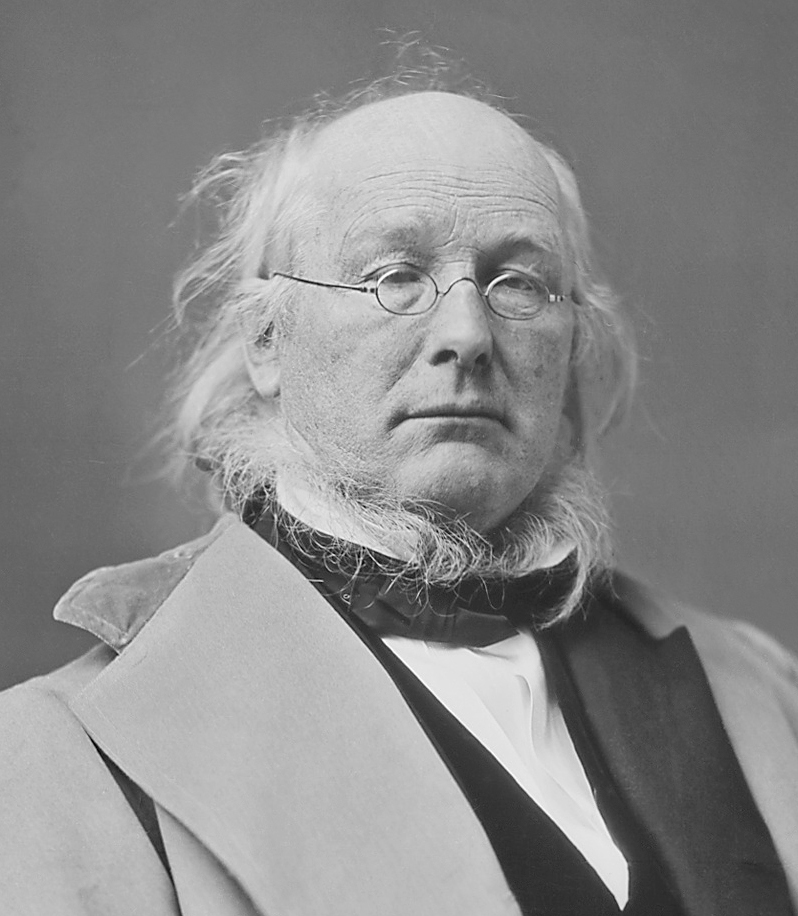
Nominee	Ulysses S. Grant	Horace Greeley
Party	Republican	Liberal Republican
Home state	Illinois	New York
Running mate	Henry Wilson	Benjamin G. Brown
Electoral vote	13	0
Popular vote	133,455	59,195
Percentage	69.20%	30.69%

Grant
50–60%
60–70%
70–80%
80–90%
90–100%
Greeley
50–60%
Tie
50%
President before election
Ulysses S. Grant
Republican
Elected President
Ulysses S. Grant
Republican

The 1872 United States presidential election in Massachusetts took place on November 5, 1872. All contemporary 37 states were part of the 1872 United States presidential election. The state voters chose 13 electors to the Electoral College, which selected the president and vice president.

Massachusetts was won by the Republican nominees, incumbent President Ulysses S. Grant of Illinois and his running mate Senator Henry Wilson of Massachusetts. Grant and Wilson defeated the Liberal Republican and Democratic nominees, former Congressman Horace Greeley of New York and his running mate former Senator and Governor Benjamin Gratz Brown of Missouri by a margin of 38.51%.

With 69.20% of the popular vote, Massachusetts would be Grant's fifth strongest victory in terms of percentage in the popular vote after neighboring Vermont, South Carolina, Rhode Island and Nebraska.

This is the last election in which Brighton, Charlestown, and West Roxbury voted in, as all three were annexed by the city of Boston in 1873.

== Results ==
1872 United States presidential election in Massachusetts
Party	Candidate	Running mate	Popular vote		Electoral vote	
Party	Candidate	Running mate	Count	%	Count	%
Republican	Ulysses S. Grant of Illinois	Henry Wilson of Massachusetts	133,455	69.20%	13	100.00%
Liberal Republican	Horace Greeley of New York	Benjamin Gratz Brown of Missouri	59,195	30.69%	0	0.00%
N/A	Others	Others	214	0.11%	0	0.00%
Total			192,864	100.00%	13	100.00%

== See also ==
- United States presidential elections in Massachusetts
