= United States presidential elections in Nebraska =

Presidential elections in Nebraska
- Number of elections: 40
- Voted Democratic: 7
- Voted Republican: 33
- Voted other: 0
- Voted for winning candidate: 25
- Voted for losing candidate: 15

Since its admission to statehood in 1867, Nebraska has participated in every U.S. presidential election. Since 1992 Nebraska awards two electoral votes based on the statewide vote, and one vote for each of the three congressional districts. The only other state to allow for split electoral college votes is Maine. Republicans in Nebraska have attempted to switch the state back to the Winner-take-all system without success. Proposals to institute winner-take-all passed the Nebraska Legislature in 1995 and 1997 but were vetoed by Democratic governor Ben Nelson. In 2016, an effort to institute winner-take-all failed after two Republicans switched their vote at the last minute. A renewed push for winner-take-all, with support from Republican presidential nominee Donald Trump, was attempted in 2024.

Nebraska is a predominantly Republican state, making it a rare occurrence for a Democrat to win the state in its entirety. Since 1940, the Democratic Party has only secured the full slate of electoral votes once—during the 1964 election, when President Lyndon B. Johnson achieved a landslide victory on the national scale. However, in more recent elections, the Democratic Party has been able to capture a single electoral vote from Nebraska's 2nd congressional district. Democrats have nicknamed the district the blue dot from its depiction on electoral maps surrounded by red states.

== Presidential elections ==
Key for parties
American Independent Party – (AI)
Democratic Party – (D)
Green Party – (G)
Greenback Party – (GB)
Independent candidate – (I)
Liberal Republican Party – (LR)
Libertarian Party – (LI)
National Democratic Party – (LI)
People's Party – (PO)
Progressive Party (1912) – (PR-1912)
Progressive Party (1924) – (PR-1924)
Prohibition Party – (PRO)
Reform Party – (RE)
Republican Party – (R)
Socialist Party of America – (S)
Union Party – (U)
Note – A double dagger (‡) indicates the national winner.

Presidential elections in Utah from 1896 to present
Year	Winner				Runner-up				Third-place candidate				Refs.
Year	Candidate	Votes	%	EV	Candidate	Votes	%	EV	Candidate	Votes	%	EV	Refs.
1868	Ulysses S. Grant‡ (R)	9,772	63.91%	3	Horatio Seymour (D)	5,519	36.09%	0	–	–	–	–	
1872	Ulysses S. Grant‡ (R)	18,329	70.68%	3	Horace Greeley (LR)	7,603	29.32%	0	–	–	–	–	
1876	Rutherford B. Hayes‡ (R)	31,915	64.7%	3	Samuel J. Tilden (D)	17,413	35.3%	0	–	–	–	–	
1880	James A. Garfield‡ (R)	54,979	62.87%	3	Winfield S. Hancock (D)	28,523	32.62%	0	James B. Weaver (GB)	3,950	4.52%	0	
1884	James G. Blaine (R)	76,912	57.31%	5	Grover Cleveland‡ (D)	54,391	40.53%	0	John Pierce St. John (PRO)	2,899	2.16%	0	
1888	Benjamin Harrison‡ (R)	108,425	53.51%	5	Grover Cleveland (D)	80,552	39.75%	0	Clinton Bowen Fisk (PRO)	9,429	4.65%	0	
1892	Benjamin Harrison (R)	87,213	43.56%	8	James B. Weaver (PO)	83,134	41.53%	0	Grover Cleveland‡ (D)	24,943	12.46%	0	
1896	William Jennings Bryan (D)	115,007	51.53%	8	William McKinley‡ (R)	103,064	46.18%	0	John M. Palmer (ND)	2,885	1.29%	0	
1900	William McKinley‡ (R)	121,835	50.46%	8	William Jennings Bryan (D)	114,013	47.22%	0	John G. Woolley (PRO)	3,655	1.51%	0	
1904	Theodore Roosevelt‡ (R)	138,558	61.38%	8	Alton B. Parker (D)	52,921	23.44%	0	Thomas E. Watson (PO)	20,518	9.09%	0	
1908	William Jennings Bryan (D)	131,099	49.14%	8	William Howard Taft‡ (R)	126,997	47.6%	0	Eugene W. Chafin (PRO)	5,179	1.94%	0	
1912	Woodrow Wilson‡ (D)	109,008	44.77%	8	Theodore Roosevelt (PR-1912)	72,681	29.85%	0	William Howard Taft (R)	54,226	22.27%	0	
1916	Woodrow Wilson‡ (D)	158,827	55.28%	8	Charles Evans Hughes (R)	117,347	40.84%	0	Allan L. Benson (S)	7,141	2.49%	0	
1920	Warren G. Harding‡ (R)	247,498	64.66%	8	James M. Cox (D)	119,608	31.25%	0	Eugene V. Debs (S)	9,600	2.51%	0	
1924	Calvin Coolidge‡ (R)	218,585	47.09%	8	John W. Davis (D)	137,289	29.58%	0	Robert M. La Follette (PR-1924)	106,701	22.99%	0	
1928	Herbert Hoover‡ (R)	345,745	63.19%	8	Al Smith (D)	197,959	36.18%	0	Norman Thomas (S)	3,434	0.63%	0	
1932	Franklin D. Roosevelt‡ (D)	359,082	62.98%	7	Herbert Hoover (R)	201,177	35.29%	0	Norman Thomas (S)	9,876	1.73%	0	
1936	Franklin D. Roosevelt‡ (D)	347,445	57.14%	7	Alf Landon (R)	247,731	40.74%	0	William Lemke (U)	12,847	2.11%	0	
1940	Wendell Willkie (R)	352,201	57.19%	7	Franklin D. Roosevelt‡ (D)	263,677	42.81%	0	–	–	–	–	
1944	Thomas E. Dewey (R)	329,880	58.58%	6	Franklin D. Roosevelt‡ (D)	233,246	41.42%	0	–	–	–	–	
1948	Thomas E. Dewey (R)	264,774	54.15%	6	Harry S. Truman‡ (D)	224,165	45.85%	0	Write-in	1	0%	0	
1952	Dwight D. Eisenhower‡ (R)	421,603	69.15%	6	Adlai Stevenson III (D)	188,057	30.85%	0	–	–	–	–	
1956	Dwight D. Eisenhower‡ (R)	378,108	65.51%	6	Adlai Stevenson III (D)	199,029	34.49%	0	–	–	–	–	
1960	Richard Nixon (R)	380,553	62.07%	6	John F. Kennedy‡ (D)	232,542	37.93%	0	–	–	–	–	
1964	Lyndon B. Johnson‡ (D)	307,307	52.61%	5	Barry Goldwater (R)	276,847	47.39%	0	–	–	–	–	
1968	Richard Nixon‡ (R)	321,163	59.82%	5	Hubert Humphrey (D)	170,784	31.81%	0	George Wallace (AI)	44,904	8.36%	0	
1972	Richard Nixon‡ (R)	406,298	70.5%	5	George McGovern (D)	169,991	29.5%	0	–	–	–	–	
1976	Gerald Ford (R)	359,705	59.19%	5	Jimmy Carter‡ (D)	233,692	38.46%	0	Eugene McCarthy (I)	9,409	1.55%	0	
1980	Ronald Reagan‡ (R)	419,937	65.53%	5	Jimmy Carter (D)	166,851	26.04%	0	John B. Anderson (I)	44,993	7.02%	0	
1984	Ronald Reagan‡ (R)	460,054	70.55%	5	Walter Mondale (D)	187,866	28.81%	0	David Bergland (LI)	2,079	0.32%	0	
1988	George H. W. Bush‡ (R)	398,447	60.15%	5	Michael Dukakis (D)	259,646	39.2%	0	Ron Paul (LI)	2,536	0.38%	0	
1992	George H. W. Bush (R)	344,346	46.58%	5	Bill Clinton‡ (D)	217,344	29.4%	0	Ross Perot (I)	174,687	23.63%	0	
1996	Bob Dole (R)	363,467	53.65%	5	Bill Clinton‡ (D)	236,761	34.95%	0	Ross Perot (RE)	71,278	10.52%	0	
2000	George W. Bush‡ (R)	433,862	62.25%	5	Al Gore (D)	231,780	33.25%	0	Ralph Nader (G)	24,540	3.52%	0	
2004	George W. Bush‡ (R)	512,814	65.9%	5	John Kerry (D)	254,328	32.68%	0	Ralph Nader (RE)	5,698	0.73%	0	
2008	John McCain (R)	452,979	56.53%	4	Barack Obama‡ (D)	333,319	41.6%	1	Ralph Nader (I)	5,406	0.67%	0	(Note: Obama won in the 2nd district.)
2012	Mitt Romney (R)	475,064	59.8%	5	Barack Obama‡ (D)	302,081	38.03%	0	Gary Johnson (LI)	11,109	1.4%	0	
2016	Donald Trump‡ (R)	495,961	58.75%	5	Hillary Clinton (D)	284,494	33.7%	0	Gary Johnson (LI)	38,946	4.61%	0	
2020	Donald Trump (R)	556,846	58.22%	4	Joe Biden‡ (D)	374,583	39.17%	1	Jo Jorgensen (LI)	20,283	2.12%	0	(Note: Biden won in the 2nd district.)
2024	Donald Trump‡ (R)	564,816	59.32%	4	Kamala Harris (D)	369,995	38.86%	1	Chase Oliver (LI)	6,399	0.67%	0	(Note: Harris won in the 2nd district.)

== See also ==
- Elections in Nebraska
- United States presidential elections in Maine

== Works cited ==
- Guide to U.S. Elections. SAGE Publications. 2010. ISBN 978-1-60426-536-1. LCCN 2009033938. OL 24461757M.
- Burnham, Walter Dean (1955). Presidential ballots, 1836–1892. Johns Hopkins University Press. LCCN 55008428. OL 6176796M.
- Presidential elections, 1789–1996. Congressional Quarterly. 1997. ISBN 978-1-56802-065-5. LCCN 97019084. OL 673017M.
