= 1888 United States presidential election in Nebraska =

- November 6, 1888
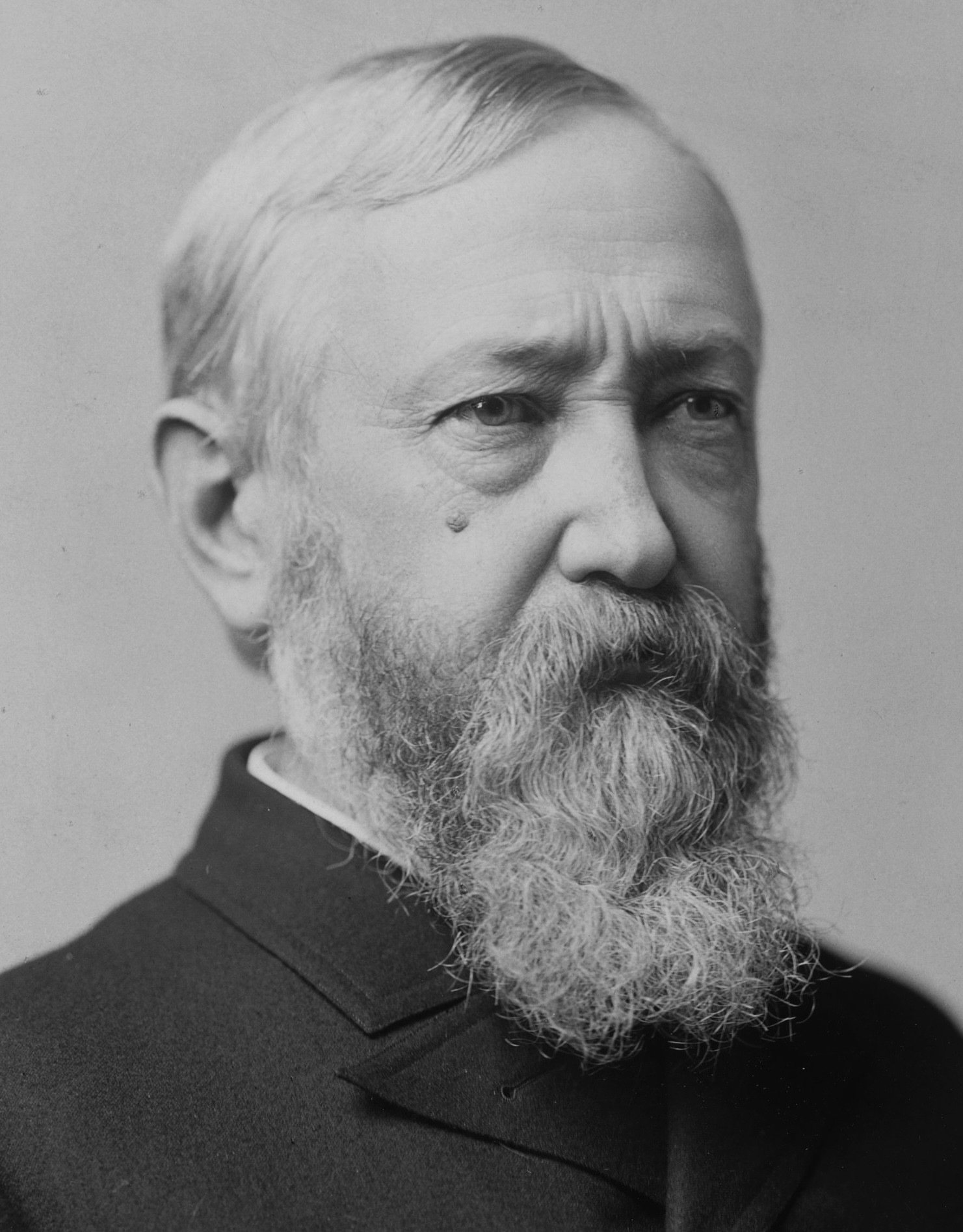

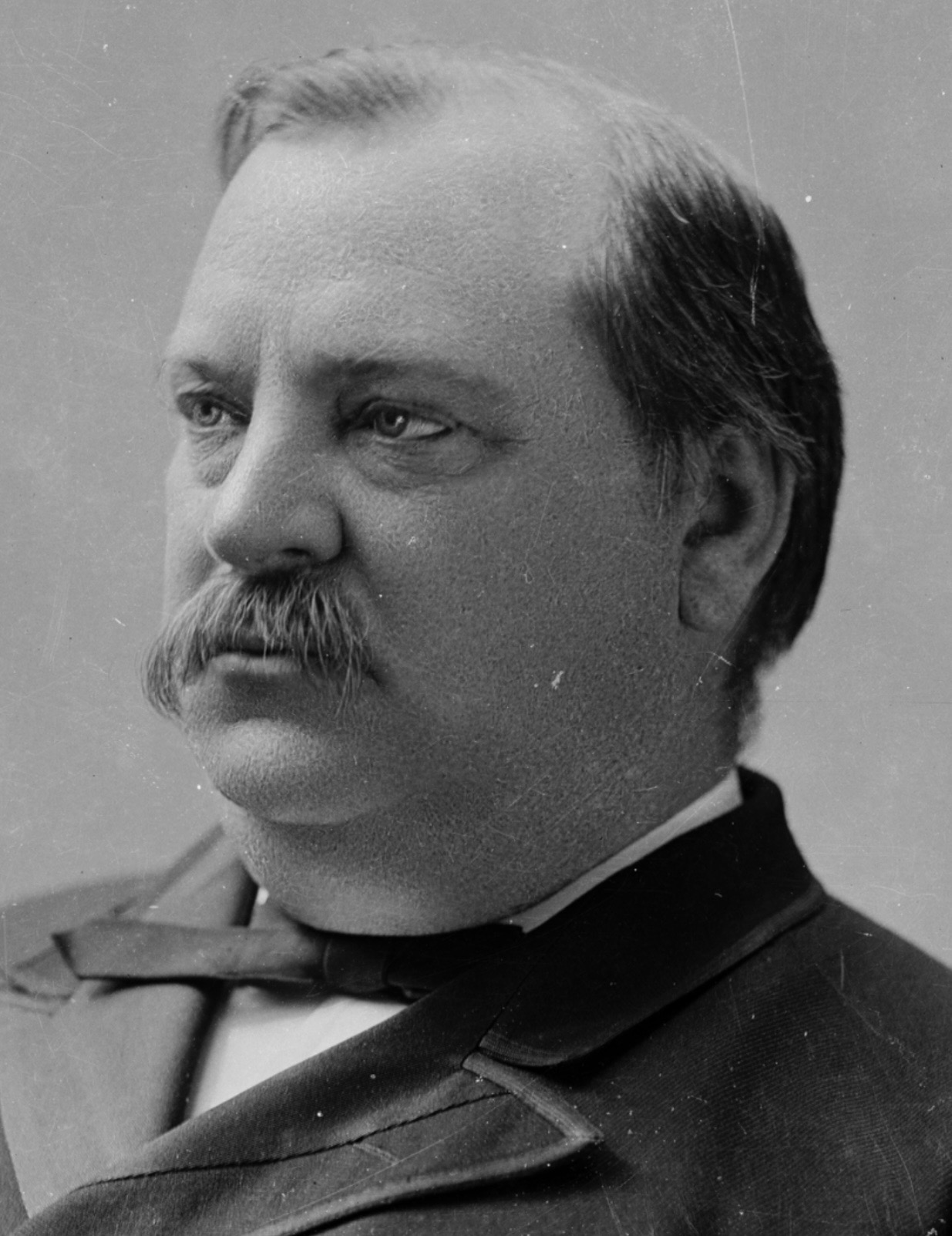
Nominee	Benjamin Harrison	Grover Cleveland
Party	Republican	Democratic
Home state	Indiana	New York
Running mate	Levi P. Morton	Allen G. Thurman
Electoral vote	5	0
Popular vote	108,425	80,552
Percentage	53.51%	39.75%
County results
Harrison
40–50%
50–60%
60–70%
70–80%
Cleveland
40–50%
50–60%
President before election
Grover Cleveland
Democratic
Elected President
Benjamin Harrison
Republican

The 1888 United States presidential election in Nebraska took place on November 6, 1888, as part of the 1888 United States presidential election. Voters chose five representatives, or electors to the Electoral College, who voted for president and vice president.

Nebraska voted for the Republican nominee, Benjamin Harrison, over the Democratic nominee, incumbent President Grover Cleveland. Harrison won the state by a margin of 13.76%.

== Results ==
1888 United States presidential election in Nebraska
Party	Candidate	Running mate	Popular vote		Electoral vote	
Party	Candidate	Running mate	Count	%	Count	%
Republican	Benjamin Harrison of Indiana	Levi Parsons Morton of New York	108,425	53.51%	5	100.00%
Democratic	Grover Cleveland of New York (incumbent)	Allen Granberry Thurman of Ohio	80,552	39.75%	0	0.00%
Prohibition	Clinton Bowen Fisk of New Jersey	John Anderson Brooks of Missouri	9,429	4.65%	0	0.00%
Union Labor	Alson Jenness Streetcar of Illinois	Charles E. Cunningham of Arkansas	4,226	2.09%	0	0.00%
Total			202,632	100.00%	5	100.00%

=== Results by county ===
County	Benjamin Harrison Republican		Grover Cleveland Democratic		Clinton B. Fisk Prohibition		Alson Streeter Union Labor		Margin		Total votes cast
County	#	%	#	%	#	%	#	%	#	%	Total votes cast
Adams	1,929	50.55%	1,282	33.60%	375	9.83%	230	6.03%	647	16.95%	3,816
Antelope	1,412	61.82%	584	25.57%	153	6.70%	135	5.91%	828	36.25%	2,284
Blaine	146	54.07%	96	35.56%	11	4.07%	17	6.30%	50	18.52%	270
Boone	1,188	64.43%	598	32.43%	58	3.15%	0	0.00%	590	32.00%	1,844
Box Butte	718	54.27%	556	42.03%	46	3.48%	3	0.23%	162	12.24%	1,323
Brown	1,075	59.72%	542	30.11%	45	2.50%	138	7.67%	533	29.61%	1,800
Buffalo	2,324	59.20%	1,375	35.02%	172	4.38%	55	1.40%	949	24.17%	3,926
Burt	1,627	68.13%	613	25.67%	112	4.69%	36	1.51%	1,014	42.46%	2,388
Butler	1,478	45.53%	1,495	46.06%	226	6.96%	47	1.45%	-17	-0.52%	3,246
Cass	3,041	48.94%	2,913	46.88%	141	2.27%	119	1.92%	128	2.06%	6,214
Cedar	586	44.90%	640	49.04%	16	1.23%	63	4.83%	-54	-4.14%	1,305
Chase	734	60.56%	417	34.41%	49	4.04%	12	0.99%	317	26.16%	1,212
Cherry	749	53.96%	540	38.90%	44	3.17%	55	3.96%	209	15.06%	1,388
Cheyenne	1,689	57.33%	1,114	37.81%	94	3.19%	49	1.66%	575	19.52%	2,946
Clay	2,090	61.47%	995	29.26%	303	8.91%	12	0.35%	1,095	32.21%	3,400
Colfax	829	42.36%	1,040	53.14%	83	4.24%	5	0.26%	-211	-10.78%	1,957
Cuming	1,038	41.99%	1,316	53.24%	96	3.88%	22	0.89%	-278	-11.25%	2,472
Custer	2,778	59.38%	1,501	32.09%	195	4.17%	204	4.36%	1,277	27.30%	4,678
Dakota	706	43.69%	896	55.45%	6	0.37%	8	0.50%	-190	-11.76%	1,616
Dawes	1,128	63.23%	656	36.77%	0	0.00%	0	0.00%	472	26.46%	1,784
Dawson	1,087	61.31%	614	34.63%	72	4.06%	0	0.00%	473	26.68%	1,773
Dixon	888	54.55%	627	38.51%	112	6.88%	1	0.06%	261	16.03%	1,628
Dodge	1,853	43.27%	2,245	52.43%	178	4.16%	6	0.14%	-392	-9.15%	4,282
Douglas	10,237	47.53%	10,810	50.19%	430	2.00%	63	0.29%	-573	-2.66%	21,540
Dundy	546	59.22%	290	31.45%	66	7.16%	20	2.17%	256	27.77%	922
Fillmore	1,923	56.49%	1,313	38.57%	140	4.11%	28	0.82%	610	17.92%	3,404
Franklin	890	55.87%	558	35.03%	106	6.65%	39	2.45%	332	20.84%	1,593
Frontier	1,043	61.14%	587	34.41%	68	3.99%	8	0.47%	456	26.73%	1,706
Furnas	1,317	62.71%	647	30.81%	85	4.05%	51	2.43%	670	31.90%	2,100
Gage	3,563	56.69%	2,347	37.34%	327	5.20%	48	0.76%	1,216	19.35%	6,285
Garfield	235	59.19%	122	30.73%	6	1.51%	34	8.56%	113	28.46%	397
Gosper	668	62.90%	368	34.65%	24	2.26%	2	0.19%	300	28.25%	1,062
Grant	42	43.75%	49	51.04%	0	0.00%	5	5.21%	-7	-7.29%	96
Greeley	519	47.48%	569	52.06%	1	0.09%	4	0.37%	-50	-4.57%	1,093
Hall	1,907	53.75%	1,509	42.53%	99	2.79%	33	0.93%	398	11.22%	3,548
Hamilton	1,730	60.49%	988	34.55%	140	4.90%	2	0.07%	742	25.94%	2,860
Harlan	1,010	56.14%	431	23.96%	200	11.12%	158	8.78%	579	32.18%	1,799
Hayes	516	58.77%	320	36.45%	7	0.80%	35	3.99%	196	22.32%	878
Hitchcock	826	61.46%	436	32.44%	28	2.08%	54	4.02%	390	29.02%	1,344
Holt	1,990	53.18%	1,532	40.94%	170	4.54%	50	1.34%	458	12.24%	3,742
Howard	916	47.98%	963	50.45%	30	1.57%	0	0.00%	-47	-2.46%	1,909
Jefferson	1,742	60.42%	1,001	34.72%	120	4.16%	20	0.69%	741	25.70%	2,883
Johnson	1,252	52.32%	947	39.57%	116	4.85%	78	3.26%	305	12.75%	2,393
Kearney	1,056	54.07%	667	34.15%	113	5.79%	117	5.99%	389	19.92%	1,953
Keith	319	50.08%	263	41.29%	21	3.30%	34	5.34%	56	8.79%	637
Keya Paha	636	59.49%	338	31.62%	56	5.24%	39	3.65%	298	27.88%	1,069
Knox	1,038	54.72%	706	37.22%	69	3.64%	84	4.43%	332	17.50%	1,897
Lancaster	5,677	56.97%	3,508	35.20%	780	7.83%	0	0.00%	2,169	21.77%	9,965
Lincoln	1,154	60.45%	726	38.03%	18	0.94%	11	0.58%	428	22.42%	1,909
Logan	206	57.70%	149	41.74%	1	0.28%	1	0.28%	57	15.97%	357
Loup	204	75.56%	58	21.48%	1	0.37%	7	2.59%	146	54.07%	270
Madison	1,392	51.27%	1,154	42.50%	100	3.68%	69	2.54%	238	8.77%	2,715
Merrick	1,136	55.28%	639	31.09%	273	13.28%	7	0.34%	497	24.18%	2,055
Nance	645	57.23%	369	32.74%	98	8.70%	15	1.33%	276	24.49%	1,127
Nemaha	1,427	51.59%	1,094	39.55%	132	4.77%	113	4.09%	333	12.04%	2,766
Nuckolls	1,251	56.81%	742	33.70%	167	7.58%	42	1.91%	509	23.12%	2,202
Otoe	2,039	44.87%	2,137	47.03%	351	7.72%	17	0.37%	-98	-2.16%	4,544
Pawnee	1,297	58.19%	645	28.94%	148	6.64%	139	6.24%	652	29.25%	2,229
Perkins	645	56.98%	402	35.51%	17	1.50%	68	6.01%	243	21.47%	1,132
Phelps	1,238	66.88%	355	19.18%	185	9.99%	73	3.94%	883	47.70%	1,851
Pierce	428	46.67%	447	48.75%	22	2.40%	20	2.18%	-19	-2.07%	917
Platte	1,240	41.92%	1,627	55.00%	91	3.08%	0	0.00%	-387	-13.08%	2,958
Polk	951	47.67%	480	24.06%	175	8.77%	389	19.50%	471	23.61%	1,995
Red Willow	1,155	55.74%	565	27.27%	64	3.09%	288	13.90%	590	28.47%	2,072
Richardson	2,084	50.28%	1,888	45.55%	128	3.09%	45	1.09%	196	4.73%	4,145
Saline	2,109	50.84%	1,746	42.09%	293	7.06%	0	0.00%	363	8.75%	4,148
Sarpy	658	41.00%	875	54.52%	71	4.42%	1	0.06%	-217	-13.52%	1,605
Saunders	2,141	48.96%	1,806	41.30%	369	8.44%	57	1.30%	335	7.66%	4,373
Seward	1,804	50.42%	1,658	46.34%	104	2.91%	12	0.34%	146	4.08%	3,578
Sheridan	1,008	54.43%	699	37.74%	81	4.37%	64	3.46%	309	16.68%	1,852
Sherman	706	53.89%	561	42.82%	42	3.21%	1	0.08%	145	11.07%	1,310
Sioux	286	46.28%	292	47.25%	6	0.97%	34	5.50%	-6	-0.97%	618
Stanton	442	47.07%	467	49.73%	9	0.96%	21	2.24%	-25	-2.66%	939
Thayer	1,391	53.36%	1,060	40.66%	83	3.18%	73	2.80%	331	12.70%	2,607
Thomas	80	48.19%	78	46.99%	3	1.81%	5	3.01%	2	1.20%	166
Valley	829	54.04%	525	34.22%	132	8.60%	48	3.13%	304	19.82%	1,534
Washington	1,302	52.61%	971	39.23%	147	5.94%	55	2.22%	331	13.37%	2,475
Wayne	616	50.57%	433	35.55%	31	2.55%	138	11.33%	183	15.02%	1,218
Webster	1,316	57.12%	749	32.51%	123	5.34%	116	5.03%	567	24.61%	2,304
Wheeler	293	68.14%	126	29.30%	2	0.47%	9	2.09%	167	38.84%	430
York	2,253	62.44%	1,111	30.79%	179	4.96%	65	1.80%	1,142	31.65%	3,608
Totals	108,417	53.50%	80,558	39.76%	9,435	4.66%	4,226	2.09%	27,859	13.75%	202,636

== See also ==
- United States presidential elections in Nebraska
