= 1964 United States presidential election in Nebraska =

- November 3, 1964

Nominee	Lyndon B. Johnson	Barry Goldwater
Party	Democratic	Republican
Home state	Texas	Arizona
Running mate	Hubert Humphrey	William E. Miller
Electoral vote	5	0
Popular vote	307,307	276,847
Percentage	52.61%	47.39%
County results
Johnson
50–60%
60–70%
Goldwater
50–60%
60–70%
70–80%
President before election
Lyndon B. Johnson
Democratic
Elected President
Lyndon B. Johnson
Democratic

The 1964 United States presidential election in Nebraska took place on November 3, 1964, as part of the 1964 United States presidential election. Voters chose five representatives, or electors, to the Electoral College, who voted for president and vice president.

Nebraska was won by incumbent President Lyndon B. Johnson (D–Texas), with 52.61% of the popular vote, against Senator Barry Goldwater (R–Arizona), with 47.39% of the popular vote.

President Johnson became the first Democratic presidential candidate since Franklin D. Roosevelt in 1936 to win the state. Nebraska was Johnson's weakest in the Great Plains region, and one of two where he did not win every congressional district, the other being Oklahoma. Senator Goldwater carried the state's 3rd district which encompassed the western half of the state, while Johnson carried the 1st and 2nd in the eastern half. Johnson carried 38 counties to Goldwater's 55. Nebraska weighed in as 17.36% more Republican than the national average.

As of 2024, this is the last time the Democratic candidate won Nebraska at large or its 1st congressional district, as well as any of Adams County, Sarpy County, Cass County, Washington County, Saunders County, Gage County, Dixon County, Nemaha County, Richardson County, Boone County, Lincoln County, Polk County, Fillmore County, Johnson County, Cedar County, Buffalo County, Seward County, Hall County, Jefferson County, Thayer County, Webster County, Platte County, Nuckolls County, Clay County, Colfax County, Franklin County, Howard County, Nance County, Logan County, and Kearney County. Douglas County and Lancaster County would not vote Democratic again until 2008. Barack Obama would later win the state's 2nd congressional district in 2008 and received one electoral vote from the state. Joe Biden, Obama's running mate in 2008, did the same in 2020, as did Kamala Harris, Biden's running mate in 2020, in 2024. Nebraska as a whole, however, has remained a safely Republican state, and has voted Republican by double-digits in every subsequent election.

== Results ==
1964 United States presidential election in Nebraska
Party	Candidate	Votes	%
Democratic	Lyndon B. Johnson (inc.)	307,307	52.61%
Republican	Barry Goldwater	276,847	47.39%
Total votes		584,154	100%

=== Results by county ===
County	Lyndon B. Johnson Democratic		Barry Goldwater Republican		Margin		Total votes cast
County	#	%	#	%	#	%	Total votes cast
Adams	6,441	53.55%	5,586	46.45%	855	7.10%	12,027
Antelope	2,004	43.85%	2,566	56.15%	-562	-12.30%	4,570
Arthur	126	34.15%	243	65.85%	-117	-31.70%	369
Banner	196	35.44%	357	64.56%	-161	-29.12%	553
Blaine	195	37.43%	326	62.57%	-131	-25.14%	521
Boone	1,905	50.16%	1,893	49.84%	12	0.32%	3,798
Box Butte	1,968	41.93%	2,725	58.07%	-757	-16.14%	4,693
Boyd	908	45.22%	1,100	54.78%	-192	-9.56%	2,008
Brown	885	41.03%	1,272	58.97%	-387	-17.94%	2,157
Buffalo	5,436	50.05%	5,425	49.95%	11	0.10%	10,861
Burt	2,074	45.75%	2,459	54.25%	-385	-8.50%	4,533
Butler	2,993	64.57%	1,642	35.43%	1,351	29.14%	4,635
Cass	3,975	57.43%	2,947	42.57%	1,028	14.86%	6,922
Cedar	3,104	57.45%	2,299	42.55%	805	14.90%	5,403
Chase	907	45.62%	1,081	54.38%	-174	-8.76%	1,988
Cherry	1,428	38.89%	2,244	61.11%	-816	-22.22%	3,672
Cheyenne	2,689	46.22%	3,129	53.78%	-440	-7.56%	5,818
Clay	2,001	51.57%	1,879	48.43%	122	3.14%	3,880
Colfax	2,207	52.81%	1,972	47.19%	235	5.62%	4,179
Cuming	2,265	42.50%	3,064	57.50%	-799	-15.00%	5,329
Custer	3,475	47.02%	3,916	52.98%	-441	-5.96%	7,391
Dakota	2,654	58.20%	1,906	41.80%	748	16.40%	4,560
Dawes	1,569	38.39%	2,518	61.61%	-949	-23.22%	4,087
Dawson	3,790	45.30%	4,577	54.70%	-787	-9.40%	8,367
Deuel	533	35.42%	972	64.58%	-439	-29.16%	1,505
Dixon	1,912	50.89%	1,845	49.11%	67	1.78%	3,757
Dodge	6,731	49.70%	6,812	50.30%	-81	-0.60%	13,543
Douglas	77,480	55.70%	61,613	44.30%	15,867	11.40%	139,093
Dundy	712	43.87%	911	56.13%	-199	-12.26%	1,623
Fillmore	2,497	56.33%	1,936	43.67%	561	12.66%	4,433
Franklin	1,409	53.17%	1,241	46.83%	168	6.34%	2,650
Frontier	841	43.55%	1,090	56.45%	-249	-12.90%	1,931
Furnas	1,669	45.35%	2,011	54.65%	-342	-9.30%	3,680
Gage	6,411	61.37%	4,035	38.63%	2,376	22.74%	10,446
Garden	559	33.57%	1,106	66.43%	-547	-32.86%	1,665
Garfield	483	38.83%	761	61.17%	-278	-22.34%	1,244
Gosper	512	48.35%	547	51.65%	-35	-3.30%	1,059
Grant	199	39.56%	304	60.44%	-105	-20.88%	503
Greeley	1,305	62.74%	775	37.26%	530	25.48%	2,080
Hall	8,273	55.20%	6,715	44.80%	1,558	10.40%	14,988
Hamilton	1,886	47.26%	2,105	52.74%	-219	-5.48%	3,991
Harlan	1,195	48.22%	1,283	51.78%	-88	-3.56%	2,478
Hayes	362	41.85%	503	58.15%	-141	-16.30%	865
Hitchcock	946	45.16%	1,149	54.84%	-203	-9.68%	2,095
Holt	2,739	46.17%	3,194	53.83%	-455	-7.66%	5,933
Hooker	137	29.03%	335	70.97%	-198	-41.94%	472
Howard	2,025	66.52%	1,019	33.48%	1,006	33.04%	3,044
Jefferson	2,804	55.21%	2,275	44.79%	529	10.42%	5,079
Johnson	1,554	54.22%	1,312	45.78%	242	8.44%	2,866
Kearney	1,767	56.65%	1,352	43.35%	415	13.30%	3,119
Keith	1,784	48.07%	1,927	51.93%	-143	-3.86%	3,711
Keya Paha	320	38.74%	506	61.26%	-186	-22.52%	826
Kimball	1,242	44.12%	1,573	55.88%	-331	-11.76%	2,815
Knox	2,617	48.74%	2,752	51.26%	-135	-2.52%	5,369
Lancaster	34,503	59.09%	23,887	40.91%	10,616	18.18%	58,390
Lincoln	6,446	57.26%	4,811	42.74%	1,635	14.52%	11,257
Logan	296	52.58%	267	47.42%	29	5.16%	563
Loup	176	33.59%	348	66.41%	-172	-32.82%	524
Madison	4,661	43.09%	6,155	56.91%	-1,494	-13.82%	10,816
McPherson	104	32.20%	219	67.80%	-115	-35.60%	323
Merrick	1,741	49.19%	1,798	50.81%	-57	-1.62%	3,539
Morrill	1,228	42.68%	1,649	57.32%	-421	-14.64%	2,877
Nance	1,323	53.39%	1,155	46.61%	168	6.78%	2,478
Nemaha	2,084	51.84%	1,936	48.16%	148	3.68%	4,020
Nuckolls	2,181	58.52%	1,546	41.48%	635	17.04%	3,727
Otoe	3,169	46.64%	3,626	53.36%	-457	-6.72%	6,795
Pawnee	1,111	48.79%	1,166	51.21%	-55	-2.42%	2,277
Perkins	877	49.02%	912	50.98%	-35	-1.96%	1,789
Phelps	2,153	46.88%	2,440	53.12%	-287	-6.24%	4,593
Pierce	1,631	45.36%	1,965	54.64%	-334	-9.28%	3,596
Platte	5,160	52.31%	4,705	47.69%	455	4.62%	9,865
Polk	1,730	51.84%	1,607	48.16%	123	3.68%	3,337
Red Willow	2,416	46.86%	2,740	53.14%	-324	-6.28%	5,156
Richardson	3,245	53.24%	2,850	46.76%	395	6.48%	6,095
Rock	376	31.05%	835	68.95%	-459	-37.90%	1,211
Saline	4,125	69.86%	1,780	30.14%	2,345	39.72%	5,905
Sarpy	5,581	55.82%	4,418	44.18%	1,163	11.64%	9,999
Saunders	4,172	55.50%	3,345	44.50%	827	11.00%	7,517
Scotts Bluff	6,368	47.76%	6,965	52.24%	-597	-4.48%	13,333
Seward	3,347	60.11%	2,221	39.89%	1,126	20.22%	5,568
Sheridan	1,156	32.15%	2,440	67.85%	-1,284	-35.70%	3,596
Sherman	1,632	68.17%	762	31.83%	870	36.34%	2,394
Sioux	379	35.19%	698	64.81%	-319	-29.62%	1,077
Stanton	1,014	43.84%	1,299	56.16%	-285	-12.32%	2,313
Thayer	2,298	51.87%	2,132	48.13%	166	3.74%	4,430
Thomas	212	39.92%	319	60.08%	-107	-20.16%	531
Thurston	1,700	58.74%	1,194	41.26%	506	17.48%	2,894
Valley	1,545	48.25%	1,657	51.75%	-112	-3.50%	3,202
Washington	2,701	50.59%	2,638	49.41%	63	1.18%	5,339
Wayne	1,630	40.86%	2,359	59.14%	-729	-18.28%	3,989
Webster	1,657	58.18%	1,191	41.82%	466	16.36%	2,848
Wheeler	248	43.89%	317	56.11%	-69	-12.22%	565
York	2,832	45.37%	3,410	54.63%	-578	-9.26%	6,242
Totals	307,307	52.61%	276,847	47.39%	30,460	5.22%	584,154

=== Results by congressional district ===
Johnson carried 2 of the 3 congressional districts, including one that elected a Republican.

District	Goldwater	Johnson
1st	45.8%	54.2%
2nd	44.4%	55.6%
3rd	51.5%	48.5%

== See also ==
- United States presidential elections in Nebraska
