= 1892 United States presidential election in Nebraska =

- November 8, 1892
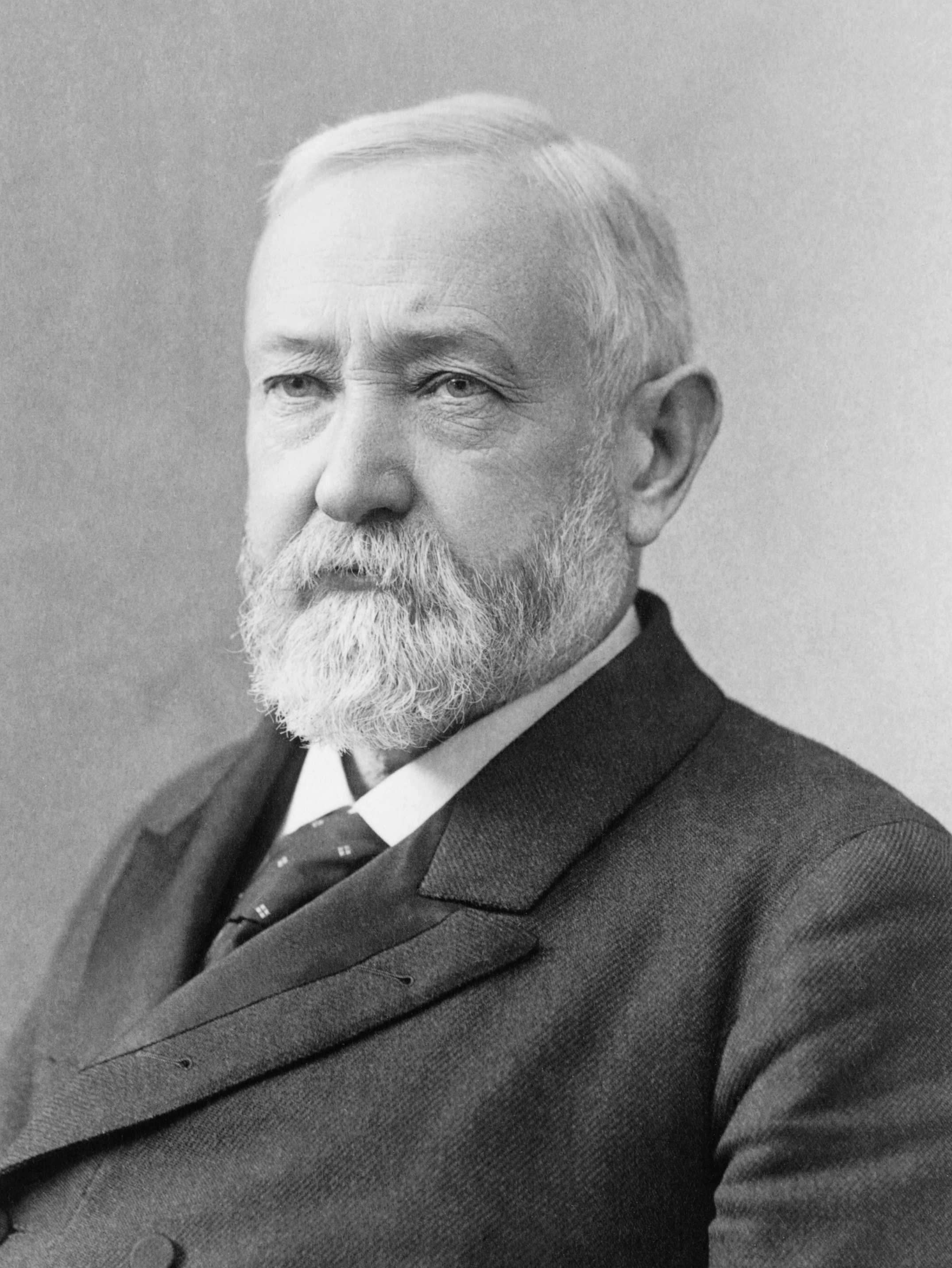

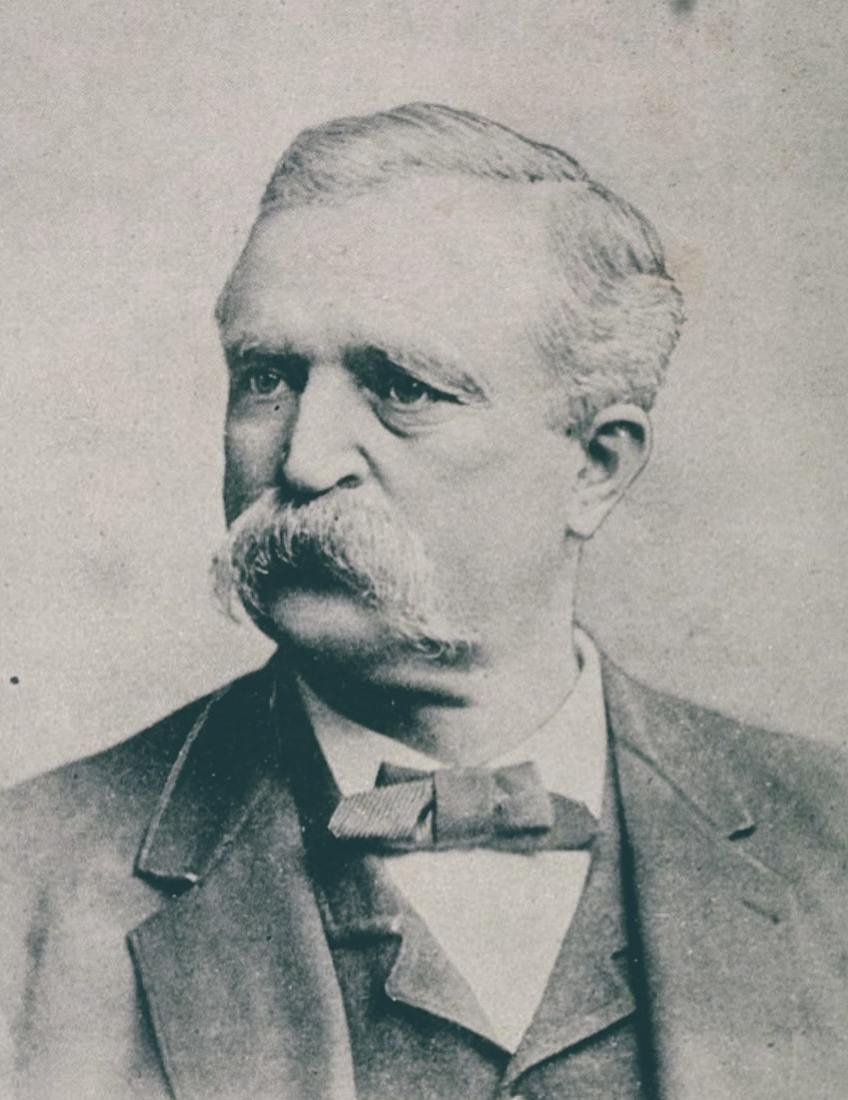

Nominee	Benjamin Harrison	James B. Weaver	Grover Cleveland
Party	Republican	Populist	Democratic
Home state	Indiana	Iowa	New York
Running mate	Whitelaw Reid	James G. Field	Adlai Stevenson I
Electoral vote	8	0	0
Popular vote	87,213	83,134	24,943
Percentage	43.56%	41.53%	12.46%
County results
Harrison
30–40%
40–50%
50–60%
60–70%
Weaver
30–40%
40–50%
50–60%
60–70%
Cleveland
30–40%
President before election
Benjamin Harrison
Republican
Elected President
Grover Cleveland
Democratic

The 1892 United States presidential election in Nebraska took place on November 8, 1892. All contemporary 44 states were part of the 1892 United States presidential election. Voters chose eight electors to the Electoral College, which selected the president and vice president.

Nebraska was won by the Republican nominees, incumbent President Benjamin Harrison of Indiana and his running mate Whitelaw Reid of New York. Harrison and Reid narrowly defeated the Populist nominees, James B. Weaver of Iowa and his running mate James G. Field of Virginia, with national winner and Democratic nominees Grover Cleveland and Adlai Stevenson I a distant third and carrying only Thomas County by plurality.

Alongside 1908, this is one of only two elections where Nebraska did not vote the same as neighboring Kansas, (Note: In 2008, 2020, and 2024, although both states were carried by the Republican nominee, Nebraska gave one of its electoral votes to the Democratic nominee due to those candidates carrying Nebraska's second congressional district, in a system for allocating electors that Nebraska first adopted in 1992.) and Weaver's is the best-ever third party performance in Nebraska presidential election history.

== Results ==
1892 United States presidential election in Nebraska
Party	Candidate	Votes	Percentage	Electoral votes
Republican	Benjamin Harrison (incumbent)	87,213	43.56%	8
People's	James B. Weaver	83,134	41.53%	0
Democratic	Grover Cleveland	24,943	12.46%	0
Prohibition	John Bidwell	4,902	2.45%	0
Totals		200,192	100.00%	8
Voter turnout				—

=== Results by county ===
County	Benjamin Harrison Republican		Stephen Grover Cleveland Democratic		James Baird Weaver Independent Populist		John Bidwell Prohibition		Margin (Note: Because Weaver finished second behind Harrison and ahead of Cleveland in Nebraska as a whole, all margins given are Harrison vote minus Weaver vote and percentage margins Harrison percentage minus Weaver percentage unless otherwise stated for the county in question.)		Total votes cast
County	#	%	#	%	#	%	#	%	#	%	Total votes cast
Adams	1,620	46.22%	320	9.13%	1,415	40.37%	150	4.28%	205	5.85%	3,505
Antelope	825	39.87%	175	8.46%	973	47.03%	96	4.64%	-148	-7.15%	2,069
Banner	197	47.58%	29	7.00%	183	44.20%	5	1.21%	14	3.38%	414
Blaine	61	39.10%	23	14.74%	63	40.38%	9	5.77%	-2	-1.28%	156
Boone	887	41.90%	188	8.88%	994	46.95%	48	2.27%	-107	-5.05%	2,117
Box Butte	416	35.96%	229	19.79%	493	42.61%	19	1.64%	-77	-6.66%	1,157
Boyd	528	44.44%	184	15.49%	464	39.06%	12	1.01%	64	5.39%	1,188
Brown	363	46.84%	74	9.55%	329	42.45%	9	1.16%	34	4.39%	775
Buffalo	1,864	42.80%	377	8.66%	2,043	46.91%	71	1.63%	-179	-4.11%	4,355
Burt	1,332	54.12%	178	7.23%	876	35.60%	75	3.05%	456	18.53%	2,461
Butler	1,099	36.31%	441	14.57%	1,428	47.18%	59	1.95%	-329	-10.87%	3,027
Cass	2,173	47.44%	723	15.78%	1,600	34.93%	85	1.86%	573	12.51%	4,581
Cedar	710	38.34%	226	12.20%	891	48.11%	25	1.35%	-181	-9.77%	1,852
Chase	355	39.23%	84	9.28%	454	50.17%	12	1.33%	-99	-10.94%	905
Cherry	499	43.13%	152	13.14%	484	41.83%	22	1.90%	15	1.30%	1,157
Cheyenne	503	45.94%	201	18.36%	365	33.33%	26	2.37%	138	12.60%	1,095
Clay	1,624	48.13%	232	6.88%	1,425	42.23%	93	2.76%	199	5.90%	3,374
Colfax	612	32.28%	589	31.07%	662	34.92%	33	1.74%	-50	-2.64%	1,896
Cuming	844	33.98%	578	23.27%	1,018	40.98%	44	1.77%	-174	-7.00%	2,484
Custer	1,810	41.29%	263	6.00%	2,189	49.93%	122	2.78%	-379	-8.65%	4,384
Dakota	394	33.50%	170	14.46%	602	51.19%	10	0.85%	-208	-17.69%	1,176
Dawes	803	46.26%	190	10.94%	716	41.24%	27	1.56%	87	5.01%	1,736
Dawson	1,188	48.23%	182	7.39%	1,067	43.32%	26	1.06%	121	4.91%	2,463
Deuel	250	43.55%	101	17.60%	211	36.76%	12	2.09%	39	6.79%	574
Dixon	665	38.71%	339	19.73%	634	36.90%	80	4.66%	31	1.80%	1,718
Dodge	1,445	38.24%	911	24.11%	1,338	35.41%	85	2.25%	107	2.83%	3,779
Douglas	10,702	48.27%	2,904	13.10%	8,322	37.53%	244	1.10%	2,380	10.73%	22,172
Dundy	362	44.04%	55	6.69%	378	45.99%	27	3.28%	-16	-1.95%	822
Fillmore	1,541	45.79%	276	8.20%	1,475	43.83%	73	2.17%	66	1.96%	3,365
Franklin	597	38.07%	88	5.61%	854	54.46%	29	1.85%	-257	-16.39%	1,568
Frontier	706	40.41%	85	4.87%	943	53.98%	13	0.74%	-237	-13.57%	1,747
Furnas	905	42.59%	104	4.89%	1,086	51.11%	30	1.41%	-181	-8.52%	2,125
Gage	3,323	52.13%	880	13.81%	1,969	30.89%	202	3.17%	1,354	21.24%	6,374
Garfield	134	40.48%	17	5.14%	175	52.87%	5	1.51%	-41	-12.39%	331
Gosper	358	36.79%	85	8.74%	521	53.55%	9	0.92%	-163	-16.75%	973
Grant	49	43.75%	11	9.82%	50	44.64%	2	1.79%	-1	-0.89%	112
Greeley	298	29.30%	159	15.63%	556	54.67%	4	0.39%	-258	-25.37%	1,017
Hall	1,546	45.83%	392	11.62%	1,383	41.00%	52	1.54%	163	4.83%	3,373
Hamilton	1,207	42.95%	265	9.43%	1,252	44.56%	86	3.06%	-45	-1.60%	2,810
Harlan	568	36.88%	101	6.56%	800	51.95%	71	4.61%	-232	-15.06%	1,540
Hayes	345	45.22%	79	10.35%	330	43.25%	9	1.18%	15	1.97%	763
Hitchcock	495	39.98%	76	6.14%	654	52.83%	13	1.05%	-159	-12.84%	1,238
Holt	1,002	39.70%	233	9.23%	1,220	48.34%	69	2.73%	-218	-8.64%	2,524
Hooker	11	22.00%	5	10.00%	33	66.00%	1	2.00%	-22	-44.00%	50
Howard	537	29.41%	329	18.02%	941	51.53%	19	1.04%	-404	-22.12%	1,826
Jefferson	1,038	42.23%	318	12.94%	1,024	41.66%	78	3.17%	14	0.57%	2,458
Johnson	1,150	48.73%	234	9.92%	907	38.43%	69	2.92%	243	10.30%	2,360
Kearney	819	41.55%	125	6.34%	964	48.91%	63	3.20%	-145	-7.36%	1,971
Keith	210	37.84%	98	17.66%	241	43.42%	6	1.08%	-31	-5.59%	555
Keya Paha	203	30.53%	80	12.03%	374	56.24%	8	1.20%	-171	-25.71%	665
Kimball	109	48.02%	24	10.57%	83	36.56%	11	4.85%	26	11.45%	227
Knox	957	45.38%	326	15.46%	763	36.18%	63	2.99%	194	9.20%	2,109
Lancaster	5,858	52.69%	1,283	11.54%	3,488	31.37%	489	4.40%	2,370	21.32%	11,118
Lincoln	969	41.30%	168	7.16%	1,154	49.19%	55	2.34%	-185	-7.89%	2,346
Logan	127	44.88%	26	9.19%	126	44.52%	4	1.41%	1	0.35%	283
Loup	115	47.13%	18	7.38%	109	44.67%	2	0.82%	6	2.46%	244
Madison	1,186	41.60%	435	15.26%	1,158	40.62%	72	2.53%	28	0.98%	2,851
McPherson	30	41.10%	13	17.81%	28	38.36%	2	2.74%	2	2.74%	73
Merrick	850	43.88%	143	7.38%	842	43.47%	102	5.27%	8	0.41%	1,937
Nance	614	42.05%	87	5.96%	728	49.86%	31	2.12%	-114	-7.81%	1,460
Nemaha	1,105	40.96%	367	13.60%	1,150	42.62%	76	2.82%	-45	-1.67%	2,698
Nuckolls	990	39.89%	159	6.41%	1,288	51.89%	45	1.81%	-298	-12.01%	2,482
Otoe	1,591	37.50%	937	22.08%	1,584	37.33%	131	3.09%	7	0.16%	4,243
Pawnee	1,266	54.13%	231	9.88%	705	30.14%	137	5.86%	561	23.98%	2,339
Perkins	328	35.50%	89	9.63%	492	53.25%	15	1.62%	-164	-17.75%	924
Phelps	768	37.39%	96	4.67%	1,071	52.14%	119	5.79%	-303	-14.75%	2,054
Pierce	396	33.70%	257	21.87%	508	43.23%	14	1.19%	-112	-9.53%	1,175
Platte	897	31.16%	665	23.10%	1,267	44.01%	50	1.74%	-370	-12.85%	2,879
Polk	733	34.16%	126	5.87%	1,187	55.31%	100	4.66%	-454	-21.16%	2,146
Red Willow	807	43.13%	159	8.50%	871	46.55%	34	1.82%	-64	-3.42%	1,871
Richardson	1,928	47.45%	402	9.89%	1,650	40.61%	83	2.04%	278	6.84%	4,063
Rock	343	54.88%	52	8.32%	223	35.68%	7	1.12%	120	19.20%	625
Saline	1,704	46.68%	500	13.70%	1,297	35.53%	149	4.08%	407	11.15%	3,650
Sarpy	582	39.17%	351	23.62%	522	35.13%	31	2.09%	60	4.04%	1,486
Saunders	1,416	34.40%	559	13.58%	1,965	47.74%	176	4.28%	-549	-13.34%	4,116
Scotts Bluff	217	49.21%	45	10.20%	172	39.00%	7	1.59%	45	10.20%	441
Seward	1,336	40.05%	763	22.87%	1,183	35.46%	54	1.62%	153	4.59%	3,336
Sheridan	644	35.64%	163	9.02%	964	53.35%	36	1.99%	-320	-17.71%	1,807
Sherman	453	36.86%	122	9.93%	636	51.75%	18	1.46%	-183	-14.89%	1,229
Sioux	139	32.78%	90	21.23%	195	45.99%	0	0.00%	-56	-13.21%	424
Stanton	381	36.78%	242	23.36%	402	38.80%	11	1.06%	-21	-2.03%	1,036
Thayer	1,261	46.63%	356	13.17%	1,019	37.68%	68	2.51%	242	8.95%	2,704
Thomas	35	37.23%	36	38.30%	22	23.40%	1	1.06%	-1 (Note: In this county where Harrison and Cleveland did finish in the first two places, margin given is Harrison vote minus Cleveland vote and percentage margin Harrison percentage minus Cleveland percentage.)	-1.06%	94
Thurston	470	63.17%	78	10.48%	186	25.00%	10	1.34%	284	38.17%	744
Valley	579	37.28%	145	9.34%	793	51.06%	36	2.32%	-214	-13.78%	1,553
Washington	1,068	44.04%	567	23.38%	744	30.68%	46	1.90%	324	13.36%	2,425
Wayne	676	43.67%	271	17.51%	576	37.21%	25	1.61%	100	6.46%	1,548
Webster	1,023	44.97%	169	7.43%	1,040	45.71%	43	1.89%	-17	-0.75%	2,275
Wheeler	122	39.87%	29	9.48%	150	49.02%	5	1.63%	-28	-9.15%	306
York	1,917	51.44%	219	5.88%	1,484	39.82%	107	2.87%	433	11.62%	3,727
Totals	87,163	43.54%	24,926	12.45%	83,194	41.56%	4,902	2.45%	3,969	1.98%	200,185

== See also ==
- United States presidential elections in Nebraska
