= 1908 United States presidential election in Nebraska =

- November 3, 1908
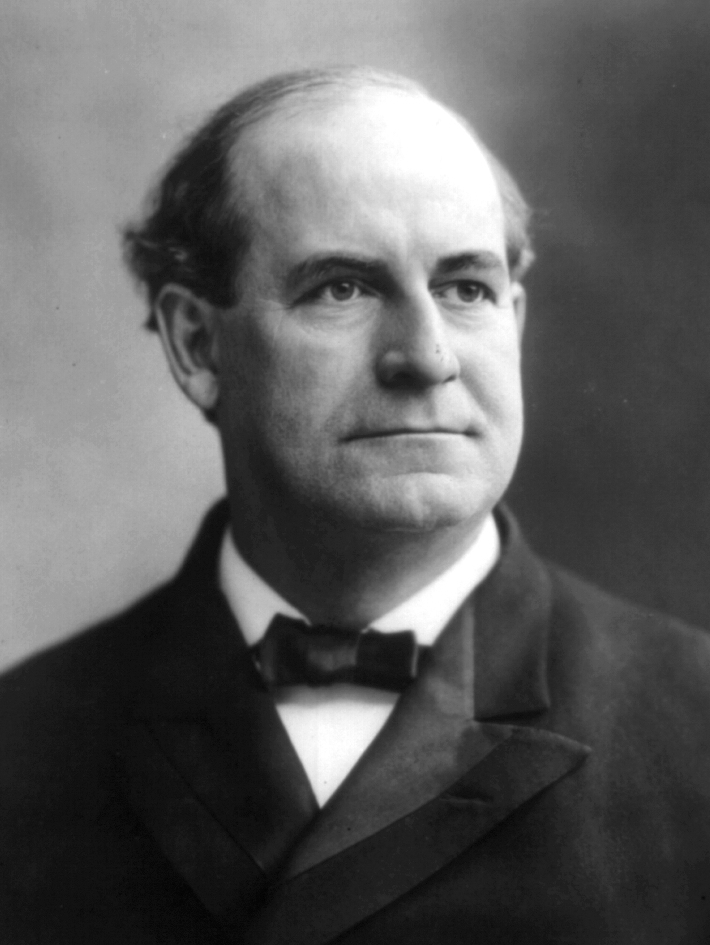

Nominee	William Jennings Bryan	William Howard Taft
Party	Democratic	Republican
Home state	Nebraska	Ohio
Running mate	John W. Kern	James S. Sherman
Electoral vote	8	0
Popular vote	131,099	126,997
Percentage	49.14%	47.60%
County results
Bryan
40–50%
50–60%
Taft
40–50%
50–60%
60–70%
President before election
Theodore Roosevelt
Republican
Elected President
William Howard Taft
Republican

The 1908 United States presidential election in Nebraska took place on November 3, 1908. All contemporary 46 states were part of the 1908 United States presidential election. Voters chose eight electors to the Electoral College, which selected the president and vice president.

Nebraska was won by the Democratic nominees, former Representative William Jennings Bryan of Nebraska and his running mate John W. Kern of Indiana. They defeated the Republican Party nominees, former Secretary of War William Howard Taft of Ohio and his running mate James S. Sherman of New York. Bryan won his home state by a narrow margin of 1.54%.

Bryan had previously won Nebraska against William McKinley in 1896 but lost it to McKinley in their 1900 rematch. Bryan's two wins in the state are the only times a Democrat has carried Nebraska without winning the presidency, although Kamala Harris would win one of the state's electoral votes in her unsuccessful 2024 presidential bid.

As of 2024, this along with 1892 is the second and last time that Nebraska has voted for a different presidential candidate than neighboring Kansas.

== Results ==
1908 United States presidential election in Nebraska
Party	Candidate	Votes	Percentage	Electoral votes
Democratic	William Jennings Bryan	131,099	49.14%	8
Republican	William Howard Taft	126,997	47.60%	0
Prohibition	Eugene W. Chafin	5,179	1.94%	0
Social Democratic	Eugene V. Debs	3,524	1.32%	0
Totals		266,799	100.00%	8
Voter turnout				—

=== Results by county ===
County	William Jennings Bryan Democratic		William Howard Taft Republican		Eugene Wilder Chafin Prohibition		Eugene Victor Debs Socialist		Margin		Total votes cast
County	#	%	#	%	#	%	#	%	#	%	Total votes cast
Adams	2,337	51.53%	1,987	43.81%	119	2.62%	92	2.03%	350	7.72%	4,535
Antelope	1,455	45.36%	1,658	51.68%	66	2.06%	29	0.90%	-203	-6.33%	3,208
Banner	74	27.61%	175	65.30%	2	0.75%	17	6.34%	-101	-37.69%	268
Blaine	160	40.82%	220	56.12%	4	1.02%	8	2.04%	-60	-15.31%	392
Boone	1,583	49.24%	1,580	49.14%	40	1.24%	12	0.37%	3	0.09%	3,215
Box Butte	684	51.35%	600	45.05%	19	1.43%	29	2.18%	84	6.31%	1,332
Boyd	891	46.75%	954	50.05%	34	1.78%	27	1.42%	-63	-3.31%	1,906
Brown	526	44.92%	588	50.21%	15	1.28%	42	3.59%	-62	-5.29%	1,171
Buffalo	2,520	48.49%	2,526	48.60%	75	1.44%	76	1.46%	-6	-0.12%	5,197
Burt	1,215	38.47%	1,880	59.53%	49	1.55%	14	0.44%	-665	-21.06%	3,158
Butler	2,129	59.16%	1,412	39.23%	41	1.14%	17	0.47%	717	19.92%	3,599
Cass	2,387	48.03%	2,440	49.09%	85	1.71%	58	1.17%	-53	-1.07%	4,970
Cedar	1,732	50.90%	1,627	47.81%	39	1.15%	5	0.15%	105	3.09%	3,403
Chase	338	43.61%	400	51.61%	34	4.39%	3	0.39%	-62	-8.00%	775
Cherry	1,021	47.09%	1,048	48.34%	41	1.89%	58	2.68%	-27	-1.25%	2,168
Cheyenne	809	45.97%	886	50.34%	28	1.59%	37	2.10%	-77	-4.38%	1,760
Clay	1,939	49.01%	1,891	47.80%	95	2.40%	31	0.78%	48	1.21%	3,956
Colfax	1,267	51.03%	1,159	46.68%	21	0.85%	36	1.45%	108	4.35%	2,483
Cuming	1,722	56.64%	1,284	42.24%	29	0.95%	5	0.16%	438	14.41%	3,040
Custer	2,898	48.86%	2,788	47.01%	98	1.65%	147	2.48%	110	1.85%	5,931
Dakota	716	48.09%	729	48.96%	22	1.48%	22	1.48%	-13	-0.87%	1,489
Dawes	727	45.21%	836	51.99%	16	1.00%	29	1.80%	-109	-6.78%	1,608
Dawson	1,926	51.06%	1,737	46.05%	87	2.31%	22	0.58%	189	5.01%	3,772
Deuel	392	41.79%	526	56.08%	12	1.28%	8	0.85%	-134	-14.29%	938
Dixon	1,100	45.23%	1,257	51.69%	63	2.59%	12	0.49%	-157	-6.46%	2,432
Dodge	2,664	50.66%	2,437	46.34%	109	2.07%	49	0.93%	227	4.32%	5,259
Douglas	15,583	50.74%	14,066	45.80%	266	0.87%	798	2.60%	1,517	4.94%	30,713
Dundy	391	42.50%	486	52.83%	17	1.85%	26	2.83%	-95	-10.33%	920
Fillmore	1,989	52.22%	1,756	46.10%	40	1.05%	24	0.63%	233	6.12%	3,809
Franklin	1,298	52.42%	1,083	43.74%	57	2.30%	38	1.53%	215	8.68%	2,476
Frontier	847	41.24%	1,098	53.46%	55	2.68%	54	2.63%	-251	-12.22%	2,054
Furnas	1,618	51.78%	1,400	44.80%	92	2.94%	15	0.48%	218	6.98%	3,125
Gage	3,129	44.38%	3,721	52.78%	131	1.86%	69	0.98%	-592	-8.40%	7,050
Garfield	363	47.51%	368	48.17%	10	1.31%	23	3.01%	-5	-0.65%	764
Gosper	634	54.28%	499	42.72%	32	2.74%	3	0.26%	135	11.56%	1,168
Grant	101	51.79%	93	47.69%	0	0.00%	1	0.51%	8	4.10%	195
Greeley	1,072	59.36%	691	38.26%	14	0.78%	29	1.61%	381	21.10%	1,806
Hall	2,229	47.62%	2,241	47.87%	102	2.18%	109	2.33%	-12	-0.26%	4,681
Hamilton	1,664	48.26%	1,633	47.36%	129	3.74%	22	0.64%	31	0.90%	3,448
Harlan	1,158	48.19%	1,081	44.99%	115	4.79%	49	2.04%	77	3.20%	2,403
Hayes	277	40.20%	359	52.10%	11	1.60%	42	6.10%	-82	-11.90%	689
Hitchcock	632	48.77%	633	48.84%	17	1.31%	14	1.08%	-1	-0.08%	1,296
Holt	1,777	51.06%	1,541	44.28%	99	2.84%	63	1.81%	236	6.78%	3,480
Hooker	91	46.19%	100	50.76%	3	1.52%	3	1.52%	-9	-4.57%	197
Howard	1,435	57.79%	977	39.35%	40	1.61%	31	1.25%	458	18.45%	2,483
Jefferson	1,787	46.49%	1,941	50.49%	77	2.00%	39	1.01%	-154	-4.01%	3,844
Johnson	1,150	44.92%	1,357	53.01%	45	1.76%	8	0.31%	-207	-8.09%	2,560
Kearney	1,174	50.69%	993	42.88%	121	5.22%	28	1.21%	181	7.82%	2,316
Keith	310	44.99%	368	53.41%	6	0.87%	5	0.73%	-58	-8.42%	689
Keya Paha	354	41.99%	422	50.06%	18	2.14%	49	5.81%	-68	-8.07%	843
Kimball	124	34.73%	216	60.50%	7	1.96%	10	2.80%	-92	-25.77%	357
Knox	2,106	51.40%	1,871	45.67%	79	1.93%	41	1.00%	235	5.74%	4,097
Lancaster	8,540	51.91%	7,428	45.15%	400	2.43%	85	0.52%	1,112	6.76%	16,453
Lincoln	1,382	43.43%	1,541	48.43%	80	2.51%	179	5.63%	-159	-5.00%	3,182
Logan	155	49.52%	140	44.73%	10	3.19%	8	2.56%	15	4.79%	313
Loup	170	36.96%	248	53.91%	10	2.17%	32	6.96%	-78	-16.96%	460
Madison	1,878	46.15%	2,137	52.52%	40	0.98%	14	0.34%	-259	-6.37%	4,069
McPherson	165	38.55%	234	54.67%	11	2.57%	18	4.21%	-69	-16.12%	428
Merrick	1,081	44.76%	1,133	46.92%	186	7.70%	15	0.62%	-52	-2.15%	2,415
Nance	926	44.97%	1,082	52.55%	45	2.19%	6	0.29%	-156	-7.58%	2,059
Nemaha	1,674	50.01%	1,583	47.30%	49	1.46%	41	1.22%	91	2.72%	3,347
Nuckolls	1,523	49.32%	1,519	49.19%	35	1.13%	11	0.36%	4	0.13%	3,088
Otoe	2,411	50.83%	2,243	47.29%	71	1.50%	18	0.38%	168	3.54%	4,743
Pawnee	1,115	41.73%	1,468	54.94%	80	2.99%	9	0.34%	-353	-13.21%	2,672
Perkins	265	50.67%	254	48.57%	1	0.19%	3	0.57%	11	2.10%	523
Phelps	1,238	43.78%	1,445	51.10%	116	4.10%	29	1.03%	-207	-7.32%	2,828
Pierce	1,095	49.82%	1,067	48.54%	27	1.23%	9	0.41%	28	1.27%	2,198
Platte	2,487	59.99%	1,584	38.21%	67	1.62%	8	0.19%	903	21.78%	4,146
Polk	1,264	47.82%	1,171	44.31%	165	6.24%	43	1.63%	93	3.52%	2,643
Red Willow	1,317	48.96%	1,242	46.17%	53	1.97%	78	2.90%	75	2.79%	2,690
Richardson	2,258	50.53%	2,123	47.51%	71	1.59%	17	0.38%	135	3.02%	4,469
Rock	334	40.14%	469	56.37%	14	1.68%	15	1.80%	-135	-16.23%	832
Saline	2,249	51.04%	2,048	46.48%	93	2.11%	16	0.36%	201	4.56%	4,406
Sarpy	1,090	52.68%	912	44.08%	41	1.98%	26	1.26%	178	8.60%	2,069
Saunders	2,679	52.42%	2,309	45.18%	91	1.78%	32	0.63%	370	7.24%	5,111
Scotts Bluff	549	38.10%	789	54.75%	30	2.08%	73	5.07%	-240	-16.66%	1,441
Seward	2,029	50.69%	1,930	48.21%	41	1.02%	3	0.07%	99	2.47%	4,003
Sheridan	733	48.26%	709	46.68%	34	2.24%	43	2.83%	24	1.58%	1,519
Sherman	925	52.14%	776	43.74%	23	1.30%	50	2.82%	149	8.40%	1,774
Sioux	464	45.71%	516	50.84%	24	2.36%	11	1.08%	-52	-5.12%	1,015
Stanton	823	50.49%	792	48.59%	9	0.55%	6	0.37%	31	1.90%	1,630
Thayer	1,703	48.75%	1,714	49.07%	53	1.52%	23	0.66%	-11	-0.31%	3,493
Thomas	130	55.56%	95	40.60%	2	0.85%	7	2.99%	35	14.96%	234
Thurston	734	44.30%	895	54.01%	15	0.91%	13	0.78%	-161	-9.72%	1,657
Valley	1,045	48.70%	1,040	48.46%	51	2.38%	10	0.47%	5	0.23%	2,146
Washington	1,460	46.63%	1,592	50.85%	39	1.25%	40	1.28%	-132	-4.22%	3,131
Wayne	1,055	44.23%	1,297	54.38%	23	0.96%	10	0.42%	-242	-10.15%	2,385
Webster	1,354	46.72%	1,408	48.59%	119	4.11%	17	0.59%	-54	-1.86%	2,898
Wheeler	252	48.74%	236	45.65%	10	1.93%	19	3.68%	16	3.09%	517
York	2,042	46.58%	2,209	50.39%	124	2.83%	9	0.21%	-167	-3.81%	4,384
Totals	131,099	49.14%	126,997	47.60%	5,179	1.94%	3,524	1.32%	4,102	1.54%	266,799

== See also ==
- United States presidential elections in Nebraska
