= 1868 United States presidential election in Nebraska =

- November 3, 1868
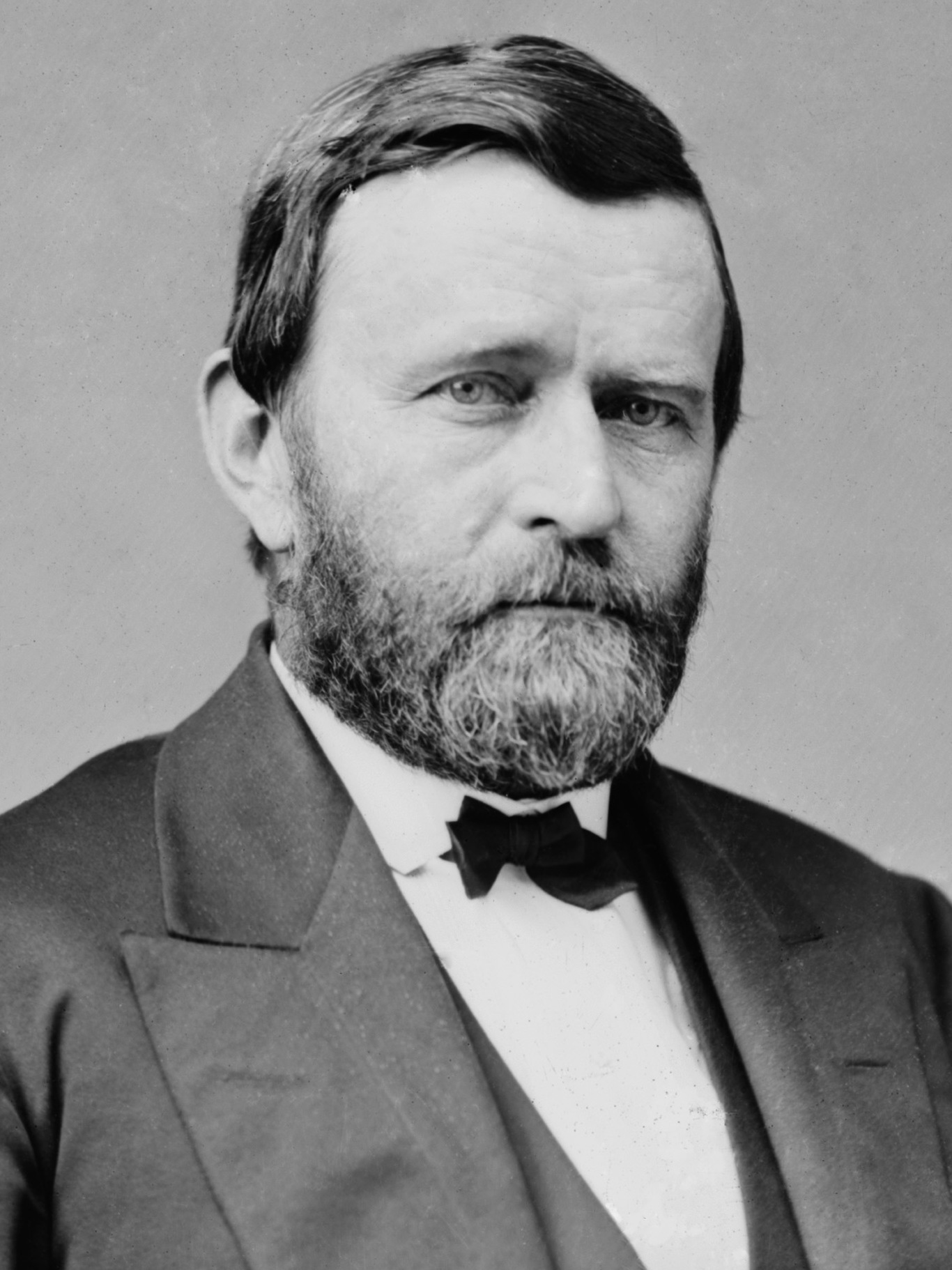

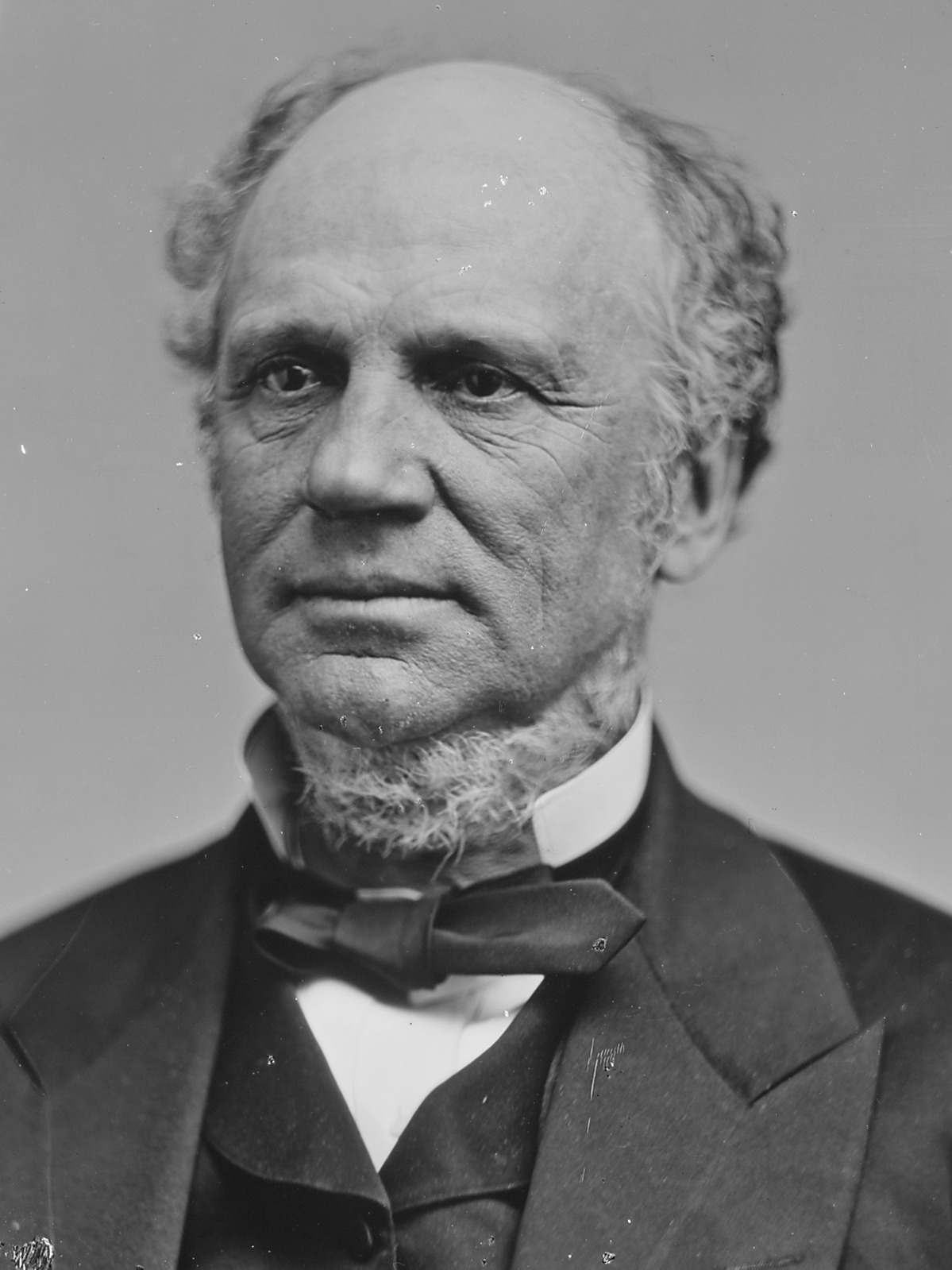
Nominee	Ulysses S. Grant	Horatio Seymour
Party	Republican	Democratic
Home state	Illinois	New York
Running mate	Schuyler Colfax	Francis Preston Blair Jr.
Electoral vote	3	0
Popular vote	9,772	5,519
Percentage	63.91%	36.09%
County results
Grant
50–60%
60–70%
70–80%
80–90%
90–100%
Seymour
50–60%
90–100%
President before election
Andrew Johnson
Democratic
Elected President
Ulysses S. Grant
Republican

The 1868 United States presidential election in Nebraska took place on November 3, 1868, as part of the 1868 United States presidential election. State voters chose three representatives, or electors, to the Electoral College, who voted for president and vice president.

Nebraska participated in its first ever presidential election, having become the 37th state on March 1, 1867. The state was won by Ulysses S. Grant, formerly the 6th Commanding General of the United States Army (R-Illinois), running with Speaker of the House Schuyler Colfax, with 63.91% of the popular vote, against the 18th governor of New York, Horatio Seymour (D–New York), running with former Senator Francis Preston Blair Jr., with 36.09% of the vote.

== Results ==
1868 United States presidential election in Nebraska
Party	Candidate	Running mate	Popular vote		Electoral vote	
Party	Candidate	Running mate	Count	%	Count	%
Republican	Ulysses S. Grant of Illinois	Schuyler Colfax of Indiana	9,772	63.91%	3	100.00%
Democratic	Horatio Seymour of New York	Francis Preston Blair Jr. of Missouri	5,519	36.09%	0	0.00%
Total			15,291	100.00%	3	100.00%

== See also ==
- United States presidential elections in Nebraska
