= 1928 United States presidential election in Nebraska =

- November 6, 1928

| Nominee | Herbert Hoover | Al Smith |
| Party | Republican | Democratic |
| Home state | California | New York |
| Running mate | Charles Curtis | Joseph T. Robinson |
| Electoral vote | 8 | 0 |
| Popular vote | 345,745 | 197,959 |
| Percentage | 63.19% | 36.18% |
County results
Hoover
50–60%
60–70%
70–80%
80–90%
Smith
50–60%
60–70%
President before election
Calvin Coolidge
Republican
Elected President
Herbert Hoover
Republican

The 1928 United States presidential election in Nebraska was held on November 6, 1928, as part of the 1928 United States presidential election. State voters chose eight electors to the Electoral College, who voted for president and vice president.

Nebraska was won by the Republican candidate Herbert Hoover, who won the state by 147,786 votes or 27.01 percentage points against Al Smith.

== Results ==
1928 United States presidential election in Nebraska
| Party | Candidate | Running mate | Popular vote | | Electoral vote | |
| Party | Candidate | Running mate | Count | % | Count | % |
|---|---|---|---|---|---|---|
| Republican | Herbert Hoover of California | Charles Curtis of Kansas | 345,745 | 63.19% | 8 | 100% |
| Democratic | Al Smith of New York | Joseph Taylor Robinson of Arkansas | 197,959 | 36.18% | 0 | 0.00% |
| Socialist | Norman Thomas of New York | James Hudson Maurer of Pennsylvania | 3,434 | 0.63% | 0 | 0.00% |
| Various | Write-ins | Various | 6 (Note: There write-in votes were not listed by county but as a state-wide total.) | 0.00% | 0 | 0 |
| Total | | | 547,144 | 100% | 8 | 100% |

=== Results by county ===
| County | Herbert Clark Hoover Republican | | Alfred Emmanuel Smith Democratic | | Norman Mattoon Thomas Socialist | | Margin | | Total votes cast |
| County | # | % | # | % | # | % | # | % | Total votes cast |
|---|---|---|---|---|---|---|---|---|---|
| Adams | 7,194 | 70.63% | 2,926 | 28.73% | 66 | 0.65% | 4,268 | 41.90% | 10,186 |
| Antelope | 4,277 | 67.80% | 2,016 | 31.96% | 15 | 0.24% | 2,261 | 35.84% | 6,308 |
| Arthur | 402 | 69.43% | 169 | 29.19% | 8 | 1.38% | 233 | 40.24% | 579 |
| Banner | 548 | 86.30% | 81 | 12.76% | 6 | 0.94% | 467 | 73.54% | 635 |
| Blaine | 484 | 73.11% | 175 | 26.44% | 3 | 0.45% | 309 | 46.68% | 662 |
| Boone | 3,816 | 62.57% | 2,260 | 37.06% | 23 | 0.38% | 1,556 | 25.51% | 6,099 |
| Box Butte | 3,028 | 70.71% | 1,238 | 28.91% | 16 | 0.37% | 1,790 | 41.80% | 4,282 |
| Boyd | 1,653 | 58.72% | 1,143 | 40.60% | 19 | 0.67% | 510 | 18.12% | 2,815 |
| Brown | 1,907 | 74.06% | 636 | 24.70% | 32 | 1.24% | 1,271 | 49.36% | 2,575 |
| Buffalo | 7,460 | 72.22% | 2,801 | 27.12% | 68 | 0.66% | 4,659 | 45.11% | 10,329 |
| Burt | 3,551 | 66.34% | 1,783 | 33.31% | 19 | 0.35% | 1,768 | 33.03% | 5,353 |
| Butler | 2,930 | 45.65% | 3,465 | 53.99% | 23 | 0.36% | -535 | -8.34% | 6,418 |
| Cass | 4,970 | 63.91% | 2,739 | 35.22% | 68 | 0.87% | 2,231 | 28.69% | 7,777 |
| Cedar | 3,206 | 49.57% | 3,241 | 50.12% | 20 | 0.31% | -35 | -0.54% | 6,467 |
| Chase | 1,540 | 71.90% | 579 | 27.03% | 23 | 1.07% | 961 | 44.86% | 2,142 |
| Cherry | 2,905 | 69.04% | 1,285 | 30.54% | 18 | 0.43% | 1,620 | 38.50% | 4,208 |
| Cheyenne | 2,618 | 62.29% | 1,563 | 37.19% | 22 | 0.52% | 1,055 | 25.10% | 4,203 |
| Clay | 4,105 | 69.27% | 1,767 | 29.82% | 54 | 0.91% | 2,338 | 39.45% | 5,926 |
| Colfax | 1,432 | 34.14% | 2,746 | 65.47% | 16 | 0.38% | -1,314 | -31.33% | 4,194 |
| Cuming | 2,418 | 47.95% | 2,597 | 51.50% | 28 | 0.56% | -179 | -3.55% | 5,043 |
| Custer | 8,379 | 76.40% | 2,506 | 22.85% | 82 | 0.75% | 5,873 | 53.55% | 10,967 |
| Dakota | 1,709 | 49.35% | 1,754 | 50.65% | 0 | 0.00% | -45 | -1.30% | 3,463 |
| Dawes | 3,276 | 73.32% | 1,173 | 26.25% | 19 | 0.43% | 2,103 | 47.07% | 4,468 |
| Dawson | 5,125 | 74.25% | 1,718 | 24.89% | 59 | 0.85% | 3,407 | 49.36% | 6,902 |
| Deuel | 1,197 | 74.39% | 403 | 25.05% | 9 | 0.56% | 794 | 49.35% | 1,609 |
| Dixon | 2,982 | 64.81% | 1,607 | 34.93% | 12 | 0.26% | 1,375 | 29.88% | 4,601 |
| Dodge | 6,250 | 60.59% | 4,030 | 39.07% | 35 | 0.34% | 2,220 | 21.52% | 10,315 |
| Douglas | 47,551 | 52.60% | 42,267 | 46.75% | 587 | 0.65% | 5,284 | 5.84% | 90,405 |
| Dundy | 1,575 | 76.42% | 472 | 22.90% | 14 | 0.68% | 1,103 | 53.52% | 2,061 |
| Fillmore | 3,479 | 60.55% | 2,235 | 38.90% | 32 | 0.56% | 1,244 | 21.65% | 5,746 |
| Franklin | 2,533 | 63.44% | 1,443 | 36.14% | 17 | 0.43% | 1,090 | 27.30% | 3,993 |
| Frontier | 2,335 | 71.76% | 879 | 27.01% | 40 | 1.23% | 1,456 | 44.74% | 3,254 |
| Furnas | 3,760 | 73.17% | 1,339 | 26.06% | 40 | 0.78% | 2,421 | 47.11% | 5,139 |
| Gage | 8,378 | 69.83% | 3,526 | 29.39% | 94 | 0.78% | 4,852 | 40.44% | 11,998 |
| Garden | 1,470 | 77.82% | 404 | 21.39% | 15 | 0.79% | 1,066 | 56.43% | 1,889 |
| Garfield | 1,180 | 83.04% | 235 | 16.54% | 6 | 0.42% | 945 | 66.50% | 1,421 |
| Gosper | 875 | 64.10% | 480 | 35.16% | 10 | 0.73% | 395 | 28.94% | 1,365 |
| Grant | 398 | 70.94% | 160 | 28.52% | 3 | 0.53% | 238 | 42.42% | 561 |
| Greeley | 1,457 | 40.88% | 2,098 | 58.87% | 9 | 0.25% | -641 | -17.99% | 3,564 |
| Hall | 6,862 | 66.58% | 3,391 | 32.90% | 53 | 0.51% | 3,471 | 33.68% | 10,306 |
| Hamilton | 3,634 | 68.77% | 1,606 | 30.39% | 44 | 0.83% | 2,028 | 38.38% | 5,284 |
| Harlan | 2,702 | 69.98% | 1,055 | 27.32% | 104 | 2.69% | 1,647 | 42.66% | 3,861 |
| Hayes | 917 | 65.83% | 440 | 31.59% | 36 | 2.58% | 477 | 34.24% | 1,393 |
| Hitchcock | 2,022 | 73.71% | 698 | 25.45% | 23 | 0.84% | 1,324 | 48.27% | 2,743 |
| Holt | 3,746 | 54.43% | 3,126 | 45.42% | 10 | 0.15% | 620 | 9.01% | 6,882 |
| Hooker | 355 | 76.02% | 110 | 23.55% | 2 | 0.43% | 245 | 52.46% | 467 |
| Howard | 1,937 | 46.60% | 2,197 | 52.85% | 23 | 0.55% | -260 | -6.25% | 4,157 |
| Jefferson | 4,359 | 65.96% | 2,193 | 33.18% | 57 | 0.86% | 2,166 | 32.77% | 6,609 |
| Johnson | 2,632 | 63.67% | 1,485 | 35.92% | 17 | 0.41% | 1,147 | 27.75% | 4,134 |
| Kearney | 2,426 | 68.28% | 1,093 | 30.76% | 34 | 0.96% | 1,333 | 37.52% | 3,553 |
| Keith | 1,715 | 67.10% | 832 | 32.55% | 9 | 0.35% | 883 | 34.55% | 2,556 |
| Keya Paha | 989 | 79.76% | 232 | 18.71% | 19 | 1.53% | 757 | 61.05% | 1,240 |
| Kimball | 1,296 | 74.01% | 438 | 25.01% | 17 | 0.97% | 858 | 49.00% | 1,751 |
| Knox | 3,668 | 55.46% | 2,914 | 44.06% | 32 | 0.48% | 754 | 11.40% | 6,614 |
| Lancaster | 30,523 | 75.17% | 9,840 | 24.23% | 242 | 0.60% | 20,683 | 50.94% | 40,605 |
| Lincoln | 5,946 | 70.58% | 2,381 | 28.26% | 98 | 1.16% | 3,565 | 42.31% | 8,425 |
| Logan | 595 | 74.38% | 195 | 24.38% | 10 | 1.25% | 400 | 50.00% | 800 |
| Loup | 594 | 83.78% | 106 | 14.95% | 9 | 1.27% | 488 | 68.83% | 709 |
| Madison | 6,229 | 64.32% | 3,407 | 35.18% | 48 | 0.50% | 2,822 | 29.14% | 9,684 |
| McPherson | 419 | 84.31% | 69 | 13.88% | 9 | 1.81% | 350 | 70.42% | 497 |
| Merrick | 3,269 | 69.57% | 1,403 | 29.86% | 27 | 0.57% | 1,866 | 39.71% | 4,699 |
| Morrill | 2,318 | 74.27% | 765 | 24.51% | 38 | 1.22% | 1,553 | 49.76% | 3,121 |
| Nance | 2,299 | 63.28% | 1,318 | 36.28% | 16 | 0.44% | 981 | 27.00% | 3,633 |
| Nemaha | 3,777 | 68.08% | 1,767 | 31.85% | 4 | 0.07% | 2,010 | 36.23% | 5,548 |
| Nuckolls | 3,299 | 65.63% | 1,684 | 33.50% | 44 | 0.88% | 1,615 | 32.13% | 5,027 |
| Otoe | 5,063 | 62.68% | 2,959 | 36.63% | 55 | 0.68% | 2,104 | 26.05% | 8,077 |
| Pawnee | 2,825 | 64.29% | 1,547 | 35.21% | 22 | 0.50% | 1,278 | 29.09% | 4,394 |
| Perkins | 1,461 | 69.37% | 631 | 29.96% | 14 | 0.66% | 830 | 39.41% | 2,106 |
| Phelps | 3,297 | 77.56% | 927 | 21.81% | 27 | 0.64% | 2,370 | 55.75% | 4,251 |
| Pierce | 2,542 | 61.45% | 1,586 | 38.34% | 9 | 0.22% | 956 | 23.11% | 4,137 |
| Platte | 3,435 | 41.84% | 4,748 | 57.83% | 27 | 0.33% | -1,313 | -15.99% | 8,210 |
| Polk | 3,096 | 67.17% | 1,494 | 32.41% | 19 | 0.41% | 1,602 | 34.76% | 4,609 |
| Red Willow | 3,559 | 66.10% | 1,770 | 32.88% | 55 | 1.02% | 1,789 | 33.23% | 5,384 |
| Richardson | 5,833 | 65.09% | 3,072 | 34.28% | 57 | 0.64% | 2,761 | 30.81% | 8,962 |
| Rock | 1,034 | 77.11% | 305 | 22.74% | 2 | 0.15% | 729 | 54.36% | 1,341 |
| Saline | 3,347 | 45.67% | 3,955 | 53.97% | 26 | 0.35% | -608 | -8.30% | 7,328 |
| Sarpy | 2,011 | 51.04% | 1,900 | 48.22% | 29 | 0.74% | 111 | 2.82% | 3,940 |
| Saunders | 5,356 | 58.31% | 3,793 | 41.29% | 37 | 0.40% | 1,563 | 17.02% | 9,186 |
| Scotts Bluff | 6,677 | 81.76% | 1,403 | 17.18% | 87 | 1.07% | 5,274 | 64.58% | 8,167 |
| Seward | 3,539 | 59.68% | 2,367 | 39.92% | 24 | 0.40% | 1,172 | 19.76% | 5,930 |
| Sheridan | 3,030 | 70.22% | 1,226 | 28.41% | 59 | 1.37% | 1,804 | 41.81% | 4,315 |
| Sherman | 1,675 | 48.76% | 1,733 | 50.45% | 27 | 0.79% | -58 | -1.69% | 3,435 |
| Sioux | 1,178 | 72.54% | 435 | 26.79% | 11 | 0.68% | 743 | 45.75% | 1,624 |
| Stanton | 1,211 | 48.17% | 1,296 | 51.55% | 7 | 0.28% | -85 | -3.38% | 2,514 |
| Thayer | 3,552 | 61.80% | 2,173 | 37.80% | 23 | 0.40% | 1,379 | 23.99% | 5,748 |
| Thomas | 406 | 72.24% | 152 | 27.05% | 4 | 0.71% | 254 | 45.20% | 562 |
| Thurston | 1,538 | 45.33% | 1,837 | 54.14% | 18 | 0.53% | -299 | -8.81% | 3,393 |
| Valley | 2,768 | 69.27% | 1,205 | 30.16% | 23 | 0.58% | 1,563 | 39.11% | 3,996 |
| Washington | 2,750 | 58.71% | 1,912 | 40.82% | 22 | 0.47% | 838 | 17.89% | 4,684 |
| Wayne | 2,354 | 64.88% | 1,235 | 34.04% | 39 | 1.07% | 1,119 | 30.84% | 3,628 |
| Webster | 2,924 | 68.22% | 1,342 | 31.31% | 20 | 0.47% | 1,582 | 36.91% | 4,286 |
| Wheeler | 534 | 64.18% | 293 | 35.22% | 5 | 0.60% | 241 | 28.97% | 832 |
| York | 5,769 | 74.16% | 1,979 | 25.44% | 31 | 0.40% | 3,790 | 48.72% | 7,779 |
| Totals | 345,745 | 63.19% | 197,959 | 36.18% | 3,434 | 0.63% | 147,786 | 27.01% | 547,144 |

== See also ==
- United States presidential elections in Nebraska
