= 1896 United States presidential election in Nebraska =

- November 3, 1896

Nominee	William Jennings Bryan	William McKinley
Party	Democratic	Republican
Alliance	Populist	–
Home state	Nebraska	Ohio
Running mate	Arthur Sewall (Democratic); Thomas E. Watson (Populist)	Garret Hobart
Electoral vote	8	0
Popular vote	115,007	103,064
Percentage	51.53%	46.18%
County results
Bryan
40–50%
50–60%
60–70%
70–80%
McKinley
40–50%
50–60%
President before election
Grover Cleveland
Democratic
Elected President
William McKinley
Republican

The 1896 United States presidential election in Nebraska took place on November 3, 1896. All contemporary 45 states were part of the 1896 United States presidential election. Voters chose eight electors to the Electoral College, which selected the president and vice president.

Nebraska was won by the Democratic nominees, former U.S. Representative and Nebraska native William Jennings Bryan and his Democratic running mate Arthur Sewall of Maine. Four electors cast their vice presidential ballots for Thomas E. Watson, who was Bryan's running mate on the Populist Party. They defeated the Republican nominees, former Governor of Ohio William McKinley and his running mate Garret Hobart of New Jersey. Bryan won his home state by a margin of 5.35%.

As a result of his win, Bryan became the first Democratic presidential candidate to win Nebraska. He would later lose the state to McKinley in 1900, but win it again against William Howard Taft in 1908. Bryan's two wins in the state are the only times a Democrat has carried Nebraska without winning the presidency, although Kamala Harris would win one of the state's electoral votes in her unsuccessful 2024 presidential bid.

== Results ==
1896 United States presidential election in Nebraska
Party	Candidate	Votes	Percentage	Electoral votes
Democratic	William Jennings Bryan	115,007	51.53%	4
Populist	William Jennings Bryan	0	0.00%	4
Total	William Jennings Bryan	115,007	51.53%	8
Republican	William McKinley	103,064	46.18%	0
National Democratic	John M. Palmer	2,885	1.29%	0
Prohibition	Joshua Levering	1,243	0.56%	0
National Prohibition	Charles Eugene Bentley	797	0.36%	0
Socialist Labor	Charles H. Matchett	186	0.08%	0
Totals		223,182	100.00%	8
Voter turnout				—

=== Results by county ===
County	William Jennings Bryan Democratic/Populist		William McKinley Republican		John M. Palmer National Democratic		Joshua Levering Prohibition		Various candidates Other parties		Margin		Total votes cast
County	#	%	#	%	#	%	#	%	#	%	#	%	Total votes cast
Adams	2,042	52.12%	1,768	45.13%	56	1.43%	21	0.54%	31	0.79%	274	6.99%	3,918
Antelope	1,185	52.90%	988	44.11%	29	1.29%	29	1.29%	9	0.40%	197	8.79%	2,240
Banner	130	42.48%	173	56.54%	2	0.65%	1	0.33%	0	0.00%	-43	-14.05%	306
Blaine	60	40.54%	86	58.11%	2	1.35%	0	0.00%	0	0.00%	-26	-17.57%	148
Boone	1,366	54.64%	1,099	43.96%	11	0.44%	20	0.80%	4	0.16%	267	10.68%	2,500
Box Butte	535	53.13%	441	43.79%	19	1.89%	3	0.30%	9	0.89%	94	9.33%	1,007
Boyd	657	54.57%	500	41.53%	24	1.99%	8	0.66%	15	1.25%	157	13.04%	1,204
Brown	290	42.21%	385	56.04%	10	1.46%	0	0.00%	2	0.29%	-95	-13.83%	687
Buffalo	2,433	55.60%	1,835	41.93%	48	1.10%	34	0.78%	26	0.59%	598	13.67%	4,376
Burt	1,190	41.46%	1,608	56.03%	31	1.08%	23	0.80%	18	0.63%	-418	-14.56%	2,870
Butler	2,261	62.70%	1,285	35.64%	8	0.22%	19	0.53%	33	0.92%	976	27.07%	3,606
Cass	2,454	47.18%	2,639	50.74%	64	1.23%	21	0.40%	23	0.44%	-185	-3.56%	5,201
Cedar	1,519	58.69%	1,041	40.22%	16	0.62%	6	0.23%	6	0.23%	478	18.47%	2,588
Chase	260	50.58%	244	47.47%	8	1.56%	2	0.39%	0	0.00%	16	3.11%	514
Cherry	687	51.19%	607	45.23%	40	2.98%	3	0.22%	5	0.37%	80	5.96%	1,342
Cheyenne	505	51.90%	439	45.12%	22	2.26%	3	0.31%	4	0.41%	66	6.78%	973
Clay	1,703	49.04%	1,691	48.69%	47	1.35%	21	0.60%	11	0.32%	12	0.35%	3,473
Colfax	1,420	59.59%	905	37.98%	43	1.80%	6	0.25%	9	0.38%	515	21.61%	2,383
Cuming	1,760	56.79%	1,312	42.34%	20	0.65%	4	0.13%	3	0.10%	448	14.46%	3,099
Custer	2,494	61.57%	1,484	36.63%	16	0.39%	39	0.96%	18	0.44%	1,010	24.93%	4,051
Dakota	934	58.96%	619	39.08%	25	1.58%	6	0.38%	0	0.00%	315	19.89%	1,584
Dawes	916	51.03%	832	46.35%	28	1.56%	7	0.39%	12	0.67%	84	4.68%	1,795
Dawson	1,357	53.28%	1,128	44.29%	34	1.33%	22	0.86%	6	0.24%	229	8.99%	2,547
Deuel	282	47.55%	301	50.76%	10	1.69%	0	0.00%	0	0.00%	-19	-3.20%	593
Dixon	1,299	56.31%	934	40.49%	56	2.43%	13	0.56%	5	0.22%	365	15.82%	2,307
Dodge	2,005	43.42%	2,453	53.12%	112	2.43%	25	0.54%	23	0.50%	-448	-9.70%	4,618
Douglas	11,755	47.63%	12,326	49.95%	404	1.64%	101	0.41%	92	0.37%	-571	-2.31%	24,678
Dundy	288	49.83%	272	47.06%	14	2.42%	2	0.35%	2	0.35%	16	2.77%	578
Fillmore	1,733	49.60%	1,668	47.74%	63	1.80%	10	0.29%	20	0.57%	65	1.86%	3,494
Franklin	1,094	55.87%	821	41.93%	12	0.61%	15	0.77%	16	0.82%	273	13.94%	1,958
Frontier	1,026	56.44%	773	42.52%	9	0.50%	7	0.39%	3	0.17%	253	13.92%	1,818
Furnas	1,487	55.67%	1,148	42.98%	14	0.52%	15	0.56%	7	0.26%	339	12.69%	2,671
Gage	2,710	41.65%	3,633	55.83%	111	1.71%	35	0.54%	18	0.28%	-923	-14.18%	6,507
Garfield	223	60.11%	148	39.89%	0	0.00%	0	0.00%	0	0.00%	75	20.22%	371
Gosper	681	60.11%	419	36.98%	23	2.03%	2	0.18%	8	0.71%	262	23.12%	1,133
Grant	95	50.26%	86	45.50%	7	3.70%	1	0.53%	0	0.00%	9	4.76%	189
Greeley	777	66.07%	396	33.67%	1	0.09%	1	0.09%	1	0.09%	381	32.40%	1,176
Hall	1,845	47.88%	1,917	49.75%	70	1.82%	15	0.39%	6	0.16%	-72	-1.87%	3,853
Hamilton	1,562	51.96%	1,380	45.91%	37	1.23%	16	0.53%	11	0.37%	182	6.05%	3,006
Harlan	1,151	56.15%	836	40.78%	18	0.88%	15	0.73%	30	1.46%	315	15.37%	2,050
Hayes	284	46.79%	302	49.75%	20	3.29%	0	0.00%	1	0.16%	-18	-2.97%	607
Hitchcock	487	53.05%	421	45.86%	8	0.87%	0	0.00%	2	0.22%	66	7.19%	918
Holt	1,428	60.20%	876	36.93%	19	0.80%	30	1.26%	19	0.80%	552	23.27%	2,372
Hooker	40	76.92%	10	19.23%	2	3.85%	0	0.00%	0	0.00%	30	57.69%	52
Howard	1,285	63.80%	693	34.41%	10	0.50%	12	0.60%	14	0.70%	592	29.39%	2,014
Jefferson	1,517	46.82%	1,661	51.27%	43	1.33%	16	0.49%	3	0.09%	-144	-4.44%	3,240
Johnson	1,246	45.67%	1,408	51.61%	33	1.21%	11	0.40%	30	1.10%	-162	-5.94%	2,728
Kearney	1,160	53.60%	955	44.13%	11	0.51%	28	1.29%	10	0.46%	205	9.47%	2,164
Keith	269	59.91%	178	39.64%	1	0.22%	0	0.00%	1	0.22%	91	20.27%	449
Keya Paha	278	56.85%	189	38.65%	10	2.04%	7	1.43%	5	1.02%	89	18.20%	489
Kimball	62	37.58%	97	58.79%	3	1.82%	3	1.82%	0	0.00%	-35	-21.21%	165
Knox	1,592	58.42%	1,043	38.28%	54	1.98%	28	1.03%	8	0.29%	549	20.15%	2,725
Lancaster	5,687	45.55%	6,513	52.17%	127	1.02%	88	0.70%	69	0.55%	-826	-6.62%	12,484
Lincoln	1,358	54.25%	1,078	43.07%	44	1.76%	19	0.76%	4	0.16%	280	11.19%	2,503
Logan	128	62.75%	74	36.27%	1	0.49%	1	0.49%	0	0.00%	54	26.47%	204
Loup	133	51.95%	116	45.31%	7	2.73%	0	0.00%	0	0.00%	17	6.64%	256
Madison	1,715	46.95%	1,867	51.11%	51	1.40%	15	0.41%	5	0.14%	-152	-4.16%	3,653
McPherson	43	53.75%	37	46.25%	0	0.00%	0	0.00%	0	0.00%	6	7.50%	80
Merrick	1,020	49.56%	979	47.57%	21	1.02%	29	1.41%	9	0.44%	41	1.99%	2,058
Nance	951	55.55%	743	43.40%	9	0.53%	5	0.29%	4	0.23%	208	12.15%	1,712
Nemaha	1,930	56.38%	1,449	42.33%	13	0.38%	25	0.73%	6	0.18%	481	14.05%	3,423
Nuckolls	1,355	52.99%	1,137	44.47%	40	1.56%	16	0.63%	9	0.35%	218	8.53%	2,557
Otoe	2,384	47.79%	2,438	48.88%	100	2.00%	32	0.64%	34	0.68%	-54	-1.08%	4,988
Pawnee	1,163	42.69%	1,486	54.55%	24	0.88%	38	1.40%	13	0.48%	-323	-11.86%	2,724
Perkins	233	57.11%	166	40.69%	5	1.23%	3	0.74%	1	0.25%	67	16.42%	408
Phelps	1,147	52.66%	973	44.67%	16	0.73%	22	1.01%	20	0.92%	174	7.99%	2,178
Pierce	960	59.44%	634	39.26%	12	0.74%	7	0.43%	2	0.12%	326	20.19%	1,615
Platte	2,099	58.99%	1,377	38.70%	58	1.63%	8	0.22%	16	0.45%	722	20.29%	3,558
Polk	1,432	61.67%	841	36.22%	7	0.30%	14	0.60%	28	1.21%	591	25.45%	2,322
Red Willow	1,001	49.98%	969	48.38%	16	0.80%	9	0.45%	8	0.40%	32	1.60%	2,003
Richardson	2,540	51.35%	2,291	46.32%	67	1.35%	23	0.47%	25	0.51%	249	5.03%	4,946
Rock	224	37.71%	347	58.42%	18	3.03%	2	0.34%	3	0.51%	-123	-20.71%	594
Saline	2,004	47.97%	2,068	49.50%	60	1.44%	13	0.31%	33	0.79%	-64	-1.53%	4,178
Sarpy	1,183	61.74%	674	35.18%	34	1.77%	18	0.94%	7	0.37%	509	26.57%	1,916
Saunders	2,728	55.11%	2,121	42.85%	58	1.17%	25	0.51%	18	0.36%	607	12.26%	4,950
Scotts Bluff	244	50.94%	230	48.02%	0	0.00%	2	0.42%	3	0.63%	14	2.92%	479
Seward	1,876	51.57%	1,688	46.40%	53	1.46%	12	0.33%	9	0.25%	188	5.17%	3,638
Sheridan	857	59.56%	536	37.25%	24	1.67%	15	1.04%	7	0.49%	321	22.31%	1,439
Sherman	859	65.08%	432	32.73%	7	0.53%	8	0.61%	14	1.06%	427	32.35%	1,320
Sioux	306	65.52%	155	33.19%	4	0.86%	1	0.21%	1	0.21%	151	32.33%	467
Stanton	833	54.27%	658	42.87%	32	2.08%	10	0.65%	2	0.13%	175	11.40%	1,535
Thayer	1,315	44.68%	1,556	52.87%	48	1.63%	11	0.37%	13	0.44%	-241	-8.19%	2,943
Thomas	76	68.47%	33	29.73%	2	1.80%	0	0.00%	0	0.00%	43	38.74%	111
Thurston	717	58.25%	508	41.27%	0	0.00%	1	0.08%	5	0.41%	209	16.98%	1,231
Valley	886	55.10%	692	43.03%	23	1.43%	6	0.37%	1	0.06%	194	12.06%	1,608
Washington	1,391	45.40%	1,597	52.12%	58	1.89%	11	0.36%	7	0.23%	-206	-6.72%	3,064
Wayne	1,110	52.48%	995	47.04%	3	0.14%	4	0.19%	3	0.14%	115	5.44%	2,115
Webster	1,328	52.57%	1,137	45.01%	36	1.43%	17	0.67%	8	0.32%	191	7.56%	2,526
Wheeler	161	60.53%	97	36.47%	4	1.50%	2	0.75%	2	0.75%	64	24.06%	266
York	1,811	47.73%	1,919	50.58%	25	0.66%	24	0.63%	15	0.40%	-108	-2.85%	3,794
Totals	115,007	51.53%	103,064	46.18%	2,885	1.29%	1,242	0.56%	983	0.44%	11,943	5.35%	223,181

== See also ==
- United States presidential elections in Nebraska
