= 1876 United States presidential election in Nebraska =

- November 7, 1876
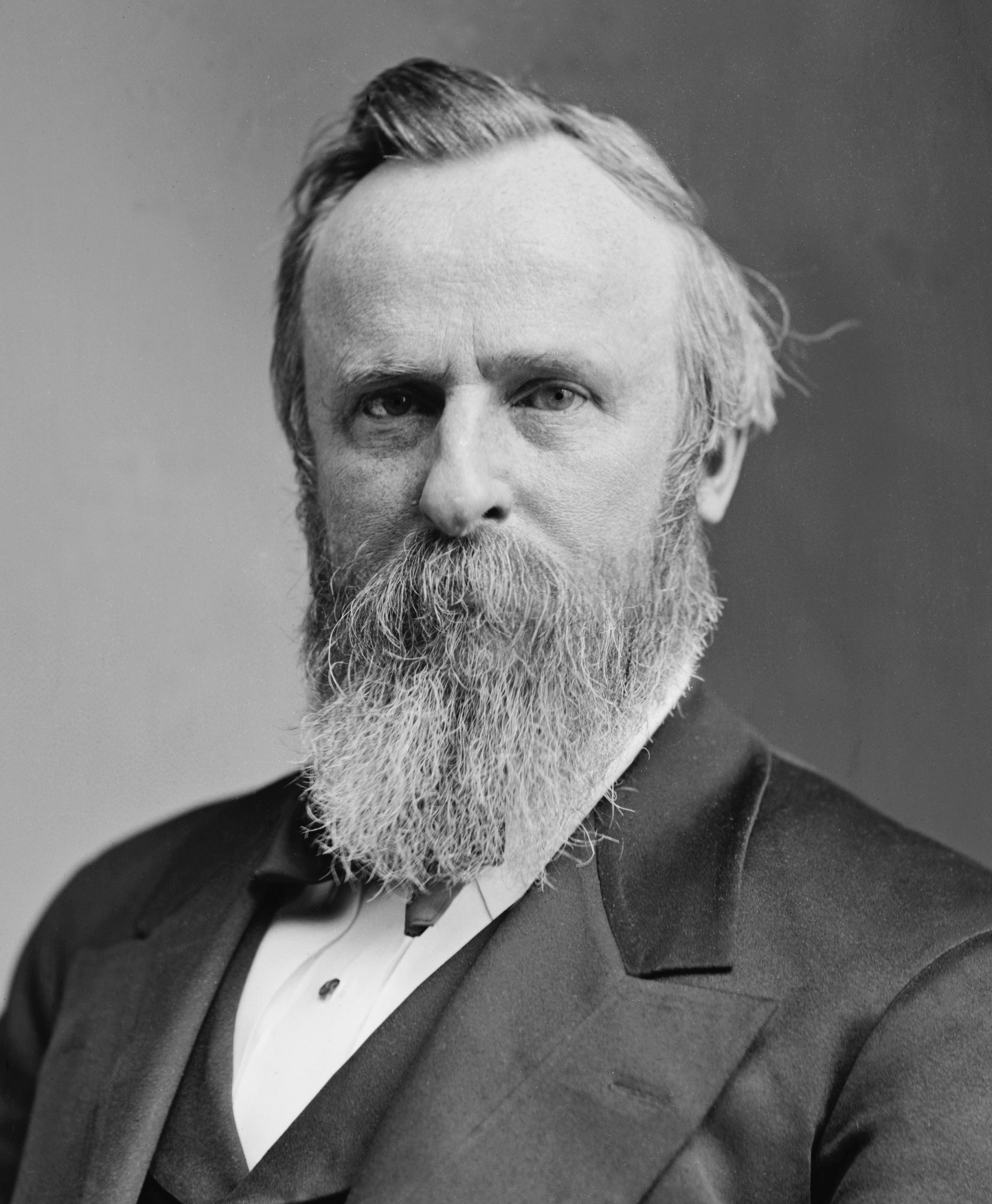

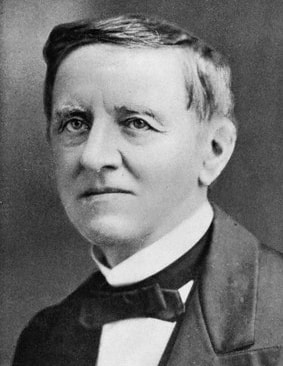
Nominee	Rutherford B. Hayes	Samuel J. Tilden
Party	Republican	Democratic
Home state	Ohio	New York
Running mate	William A. Wheeler	Thomas A. Hendricks
Electoral vote	3	0
Popular vote	31,915	17,413
Percentage	64.70%	35.30%
County results
Hayes
40–50%
50–60%
60–70%
70–80%
80–90%
90–100%
Tilden
40–50%
50–60%
60–70%
70–80%
President before election
Ulysses S. Grant
Republican
Elected President
Rutherford B. Hayes
Republican

The 1876 United States presidential election in Nebraska took place on November 7, 1876, as part of the 1876 United States presidential election. Voters chose three representatives, or electors to the Electoral College, who voted for president and vice president.

Nebraska voted for the Republican nominee, Ohio Governor Rutherford B. Hayes, over the Democratic nominee, New York Governor Samuel J. Tilden by a margin of 29.4%.

With 64.70% of the popular vote, Nebraska would be Hayes' second strongest victory in terms of percentage in the popular vote after Vermont.

== Results ==
1876 United States presidential election in Nebraska
Party	Candidate	Running mate	Popular vote		Electoral vote	
Party	Candidate	Running mate	Count	%	Count	%
Republican	Rutherford B. Hayes of Ohio	William A. Wheeler of New York	31,915	64.70%	3	100.00%
Democratic	Samuel J. Tilden of New York	Thomas A. Hendricks of Indiana	17,413	35.30%	0	0.00%
Total			49,328	100.00%	3	100.00%

== See also ==
- United States presidential elections in Nebraska
