= 1880 United States presidential election in Nebraska =

- November 2, 1880
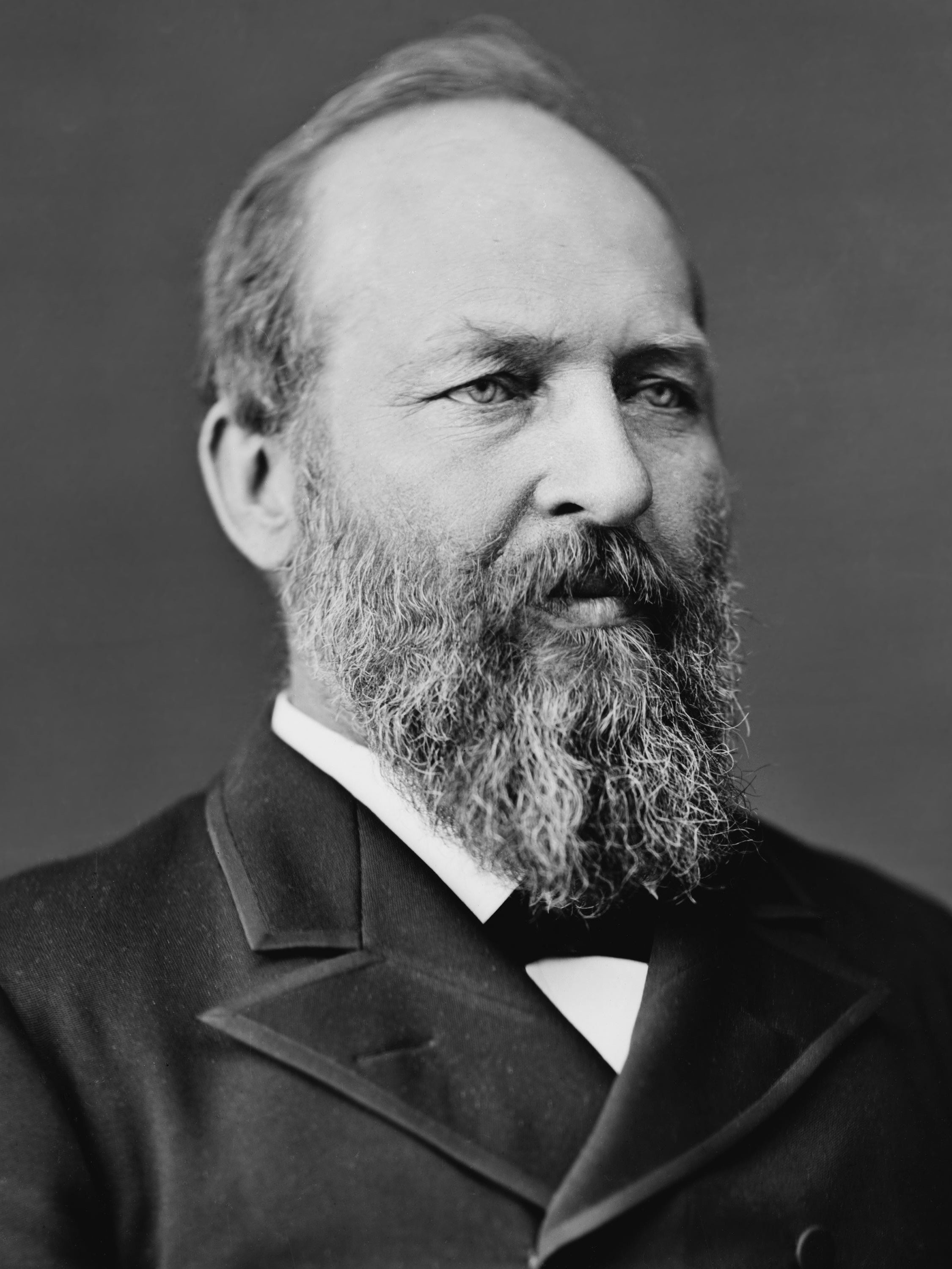

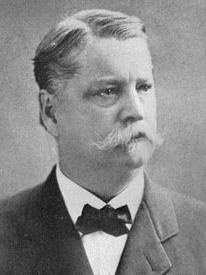
Nominee	James A. Garfield	Winfield Scott Hancock
Party	Republican	Democratic
Home state	Ohio	Pennsylvania
Running mate	Chester A. Arthur	William Hayden English
Electoral vote	3	0
Popular vote	54,979	28,523
Percentage	62.87%	32.62%
County results
Garfield
40–50%
50–60%
60–70%
70–80%
80–90%
Hancock
50–60%
60–70%
President before election
Rutherford B. Hayes
Republican
Elected President
James A. Garfield
Republican

The 1880 United States presidential election in Nebraska took place on November 2, 1880, as part of the 1880 United States presidential election. Voters chose three representatives, or electors to the Electoral College, who voted for president and vice president.

Nebraska voted for the Republican nominee, James A. Garfield, over the Democratic nominee, Winfield Scott Hancock. Garfield won the state by a margin of 30.25%.

With 62.87% of the popular vote, Nebraska would be Garfield's second strongest victory in terms of percentage in the popular vote after Vermont.

== Results ==
1880 United States presidential election in Nebraska
Party	Candidate	Running mate	Popular vote		Electoral vote	
Party	Candidate	Running mate	Count	%	Count	%
Republican	James Abram Garfield of Ohio	Chester Alan Arthur of New York	54,979	62.87%	3	100.00%
Democratic	Winfield Scott Hancock of Pennsylvania	William Hayden English of Indiana	28,523	32.62%	0	0.00%
Greenback	James Baird Weaver of Iowa	Barzillai Jefferson Chambers of Texas	3,950	4.52%	0	0.00%
Total			87,452	100.00%	3	100.00%

=== Results by county ===
County	James Abram Garfield Republican		Winfield Scott Hancock Democratic		James Baird Weaver Greenback		Margin		Total votes cast
County	#	%	#	%	#	%	#	%	Total votes cast
Adams	1,447	70.65%	550	26.86%	51	2.49%	897	43.80%	2,048
Antelope	577	71.23%	145	17.90%	88	10.86%	432	53.33%	810
Boone	671	74.80%	226	25.20%	0	0.00%	445	49.61%	897
Buffalo	1,195	73.63%	390	24.03%	38	2.34%	805	49.60%	1,623
Burt	1,010	70.29%	380	26.44%	47	3.27%	630	43.84%	1,437
Butler	958	53.58%	716	40.04%	114	6.38%	242	13.53%	1,788
Cass	1,861	55.39%	1,303	38.78%	196	5.83%	558	16.61%	3,360
Cedar	218	40.07%	326	59.93%	0	0.00%	-108	-19.85%	544
Cheyenne	232	41.88%	322	58.12%	0	0.00%	-90	-16.25%	554
Clay	1,517	72.38%	520	24.81%	59	2.81%	997	47.57%	2,096
Colfax	685	63.08%	399	36.74%	2	0.18%	286	26.34%	1,086
Cuming	598	50.17%	537	45.05%	57	4.78%	61	5.12%	1,192
Custer	299	69.70%	130	30.30%	0	0.00%	169	39.39%	429
Dakota	328	45.94%	386	54.06%	0	0.00%	-58	-8.12%	714
Dawson	347	65.97%	179	34.03%	0	0.00%	168	31.94%	526
Dixon	459	58.85%	315	40.38%	6	0.77%	144	18.46%	780
Dodge	1,439	57.10%	1,079	42.82%	2	0.08%	360	14.29%	2,520
Douglas	3,290	55.87%	2,407	40.87%	192	3.26%	883	14.99%	5,889
Fillmore	1,404	69.64%	452	22.42%	160	7.94%	952	47.22%	2,016
Franklin	585	65.80%	248	27.90%	56	6.30%	337	37.91%	889
Frontier	133	76.00%	42	24.00%	0	0.00%	91	52.00%	175
Furnas	606	70.38%	201	23.34%	54	6.27%	405	47.04%	861
Gage	1,726	63.60%	789	29.07%	199	7.33%	937	34.52%	2,714
Gosper	156	65.82%	70	29.54%	11	4.64%	86	36.29%	237
Greeley	182	57.78%	127	40.32%	6	1.90%	55	17.46%	315
Hall	1,150	67.21%	547	31.97%	14	0.82%	603	35.24%	1,711
Hamilton	997	60.64%	346	21.05%	301	18.31%	651	39.60%	1,644
Harlan	678	71.37%	239	25.16%	33	3.47%	439	46.21%	950
Hitchcock	135	73.37%	49	26.63%	0	0.00%	86	46.74%	184
Holt	334	46.52%	309	43.04%	75	10.45%	25	3.48%	718
Howard	637	64.21%	352	35.48%	3	0.30%	285	28.73%	992
Jefferson	1,069	64.67%	401	24.26%	183	11.07%	668	40.41%	1,653
Johnson	1,068	64.77%	579	35.11%	2	0.12%	489	29.65%	1,649
Kearney	550	68.92%	242	30.33%	6	0.75%	308	38.60%	798
Keith	32	38.55%	51	61.45%	0	0.00%	-19	-22.89%	83
Knox	556	69.33%	230	28.68%	16	2.00%	326	40.65%	802
Lancaster	3,397	69.50%	1,381	28.25%	110	2.25%	2,016	41.24%	4,888
Lincoln	377	59.09%	261	40.91%	0	0.00%	116	18.18%	638
Madison	670	58.06%	426	36.92%	58	5.03%	244	21.14%	1,154
Merrick	819	72.61%	275	24.38%	34	3.01%	544	48.23%	1,128
Nance	199	70.32%	84	29.68%	0	0.00%	115	40.64%	283
Nemaha	1,473	63.00%	857	36.66%	8	0.34%	616	26.35%	2,338
Nuckolls	594	63.80%	331	35.55%	6	0.64%	263	28.25%	931
Otoe	1,918	60.07%	1,226	38.40%	49	1.53%	692	21.67%	3,193
Pawnee	1,181	74.32%	326	20.52%	82	5.16%	855	53.81%	1,589
Phelps	426	86.41%	36	7.30%	31	6.29%	390	79.11%	493
Pierce	76	38.97%	119	61.03%	0	0.00%	-43	-22.05%	195
Platte	854	50.29%	832	49.00%	12	0.71%	22	1.30%	1,698
Polk	943	79.24%	236	19.83%	11	0.92%	707	59.41%	1,190
Red Willow	284	59.29%	147	30.69%	48	10.02%	137	28.60%	479
Richardson	1,764	52.05%	1,492	44.02%	133	3.92%	272	8.03%	3,389
Saline	1,841	62.53%	997	33.87%	106	3.60%	844	28.67%	2,944
Sarpy	491	47.86%	516	50.29%	19	1.85%	-25	-2.44%	1,026
Saunders	1,717	57.81%	556	18.72%	697	23.47%	1,020 (Note: In this county where Weaver ran second ahead of Hancock, margin given is Garfield vote minus Weaver vote and percentage margin Garfield percentage minus Weaver percentage.)	34.34%	2,970
Seward	1,354	59.41%	699	30.67%	226	9.92%	655	28.74%	2,279
Sherman	308	77.58%	80	20.15%	9	2.27%	228	57.43%	397
Stanton	180	50.85%	160	45.20%	14	3.95%	20	5.65%	354
Thayer	834	67.04%	348	27.97%	62	4.98%	486	39.07%	1,244
Valley	392	80.82%	93	19.18%	0	0.00%	299	61.65%	485
Washington	1,190	69.19%	499	29.01%	31	1.80%	691	40.17%	1,720
Wayne	118	73.29%	43	26.71%	0	0.00%	75	46.58%	161
Webster	1,006	72.01%	389	27.85%	2	0.14%	617	44.17%	1,397
York	1,444	68.50%	530	25.14%	134	6.36%	914	43.36%	2,108
Totals	54,979	62.94%	28,523	32.65%	3,853	4.41%	26,456	30.29%	87,355

== See also ==
- United States presidential elections in Nebraska
