= 1872 United States presidential election in Nebraska =

- November 5, 1872
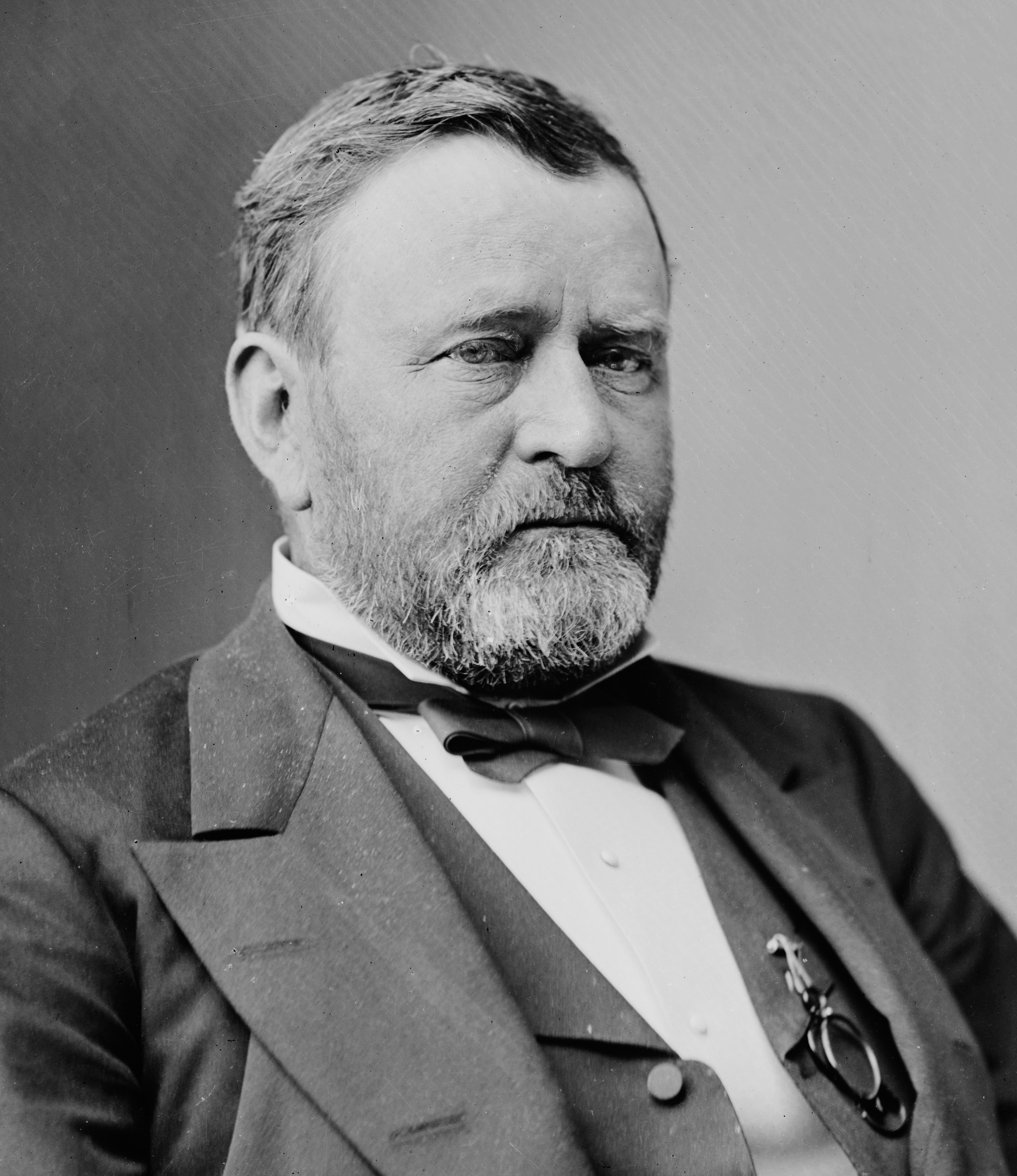

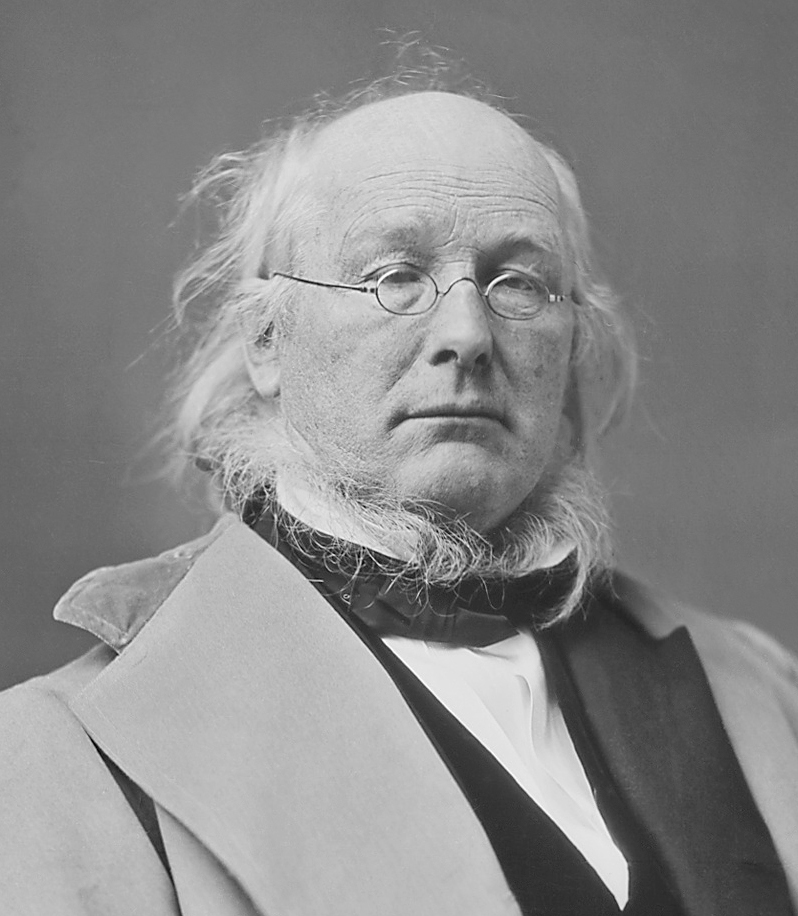
Nominee	Ulysses S. Grant	Horace Greeley
Party	Republican	Liberal Republican
Home state	Illinois	New York
Running mate	Henry Wilson	Benjamin G. Brown
Electoral vote	3	0
Popular vote	18,329	7,603
Percentage	70.68%	29.32%
County results
Grant
50–60%
60–70%
70–80%
80–90%
90–100%
Greeley
50–60%
60–70%
90–100%
President before election
Ulysses S. Grant
Republican
Elected President
Ulysses S. Grant
Republican

The 1872 United States presidential election in Nebraska took place on November 5, 1872, as part of the 1872 United States presidential election. Voters chose three representatives, or electors to the Electoral College, who voted for president and vice president.

Nebraska voted for the Republican candidate, Ulysses S. Grant, over Liberal Republican candidate Horace Greeley. Grant won Nebraska by a margin of 41.36%.

With 70.68% of the popular vote, Nebraska would be Grant's fourth strongest victory in terms of percentage in the popular vote after Vermont, South Carolina and Rhode Island. Grant's victory is, as of 2024, the best showing for any candidate, and by extension, party.

== Results ==
1872 United States presidential election in Nebraska
Party	Candidate	Running mate	Popular vote		Electoral vote	
Party	Candidate	Running mate	Count	%	Count	%
Republican	Ulysses S. Grant of Illinois	Henry Wilson of Massachusetts	18,329	70.68%	3	100.00%
Liberal Republican	Horace Greeley of New York	Benjamin Gratz Brown of Missouri	7,603	29.32%	0	0.00%
Total			25,932	100.00%	3	100.00%

== See also ==
- United States presidential elections in Nebraska
