= Howard County, Nebraska =

County in Nebraska, United States

- County
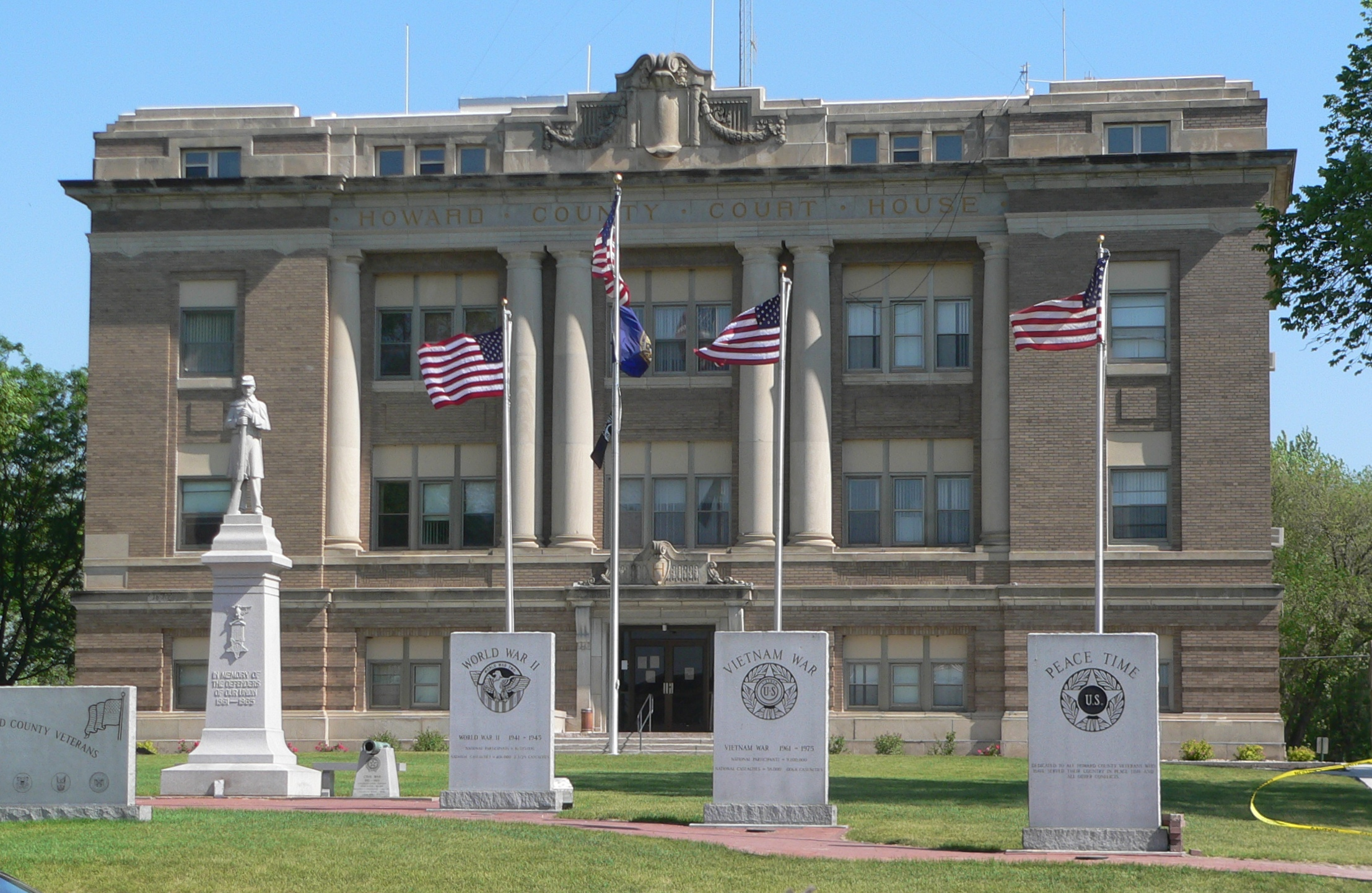
- Howard County Courthouse in St. Paul

- Location within the U.S. state of Nebraska
- Coordinates: 41°13′N 98°31′W
- Country: United States
- State: Nebraska
- Founded: 1871
- Named for: Oliver O. Howard
- Seat: St. Paul
- Largest city: St. Paul

Area
  - Total: 576 sq mi (1,490 km^{2})
  - Land: 569 sq mi (1,470 km^{2})
  - Water: 6.3 sq mi (16 km^{2}) 1.1%

Population (2020)
  - Total: 6,475
  - Estimate (2025): 6,538 ▲
  - Density: 11.4/sq mi (4.39/km^{2})
- Time zone: UTC−6 (Central)
  - Summer (DST): UTC−5 (CDT)
- Congressional district: 3rd
- Website: www.howardcounty.ne.gov

Howard County is a county in the state of Nebraska. As of the 2020 United States census, the population was 6,475. Its county seat is St. Paul. The county was formed in 1871 and named after Civil War General Oliver Otis Howard.

Howard County is part of the Grand Island metropolitan area.

In the Nebraska license plate system, Howard County is represented by the prefix 49 (it had the 49th-largest number of vehicles registered in the state when the license plate system was established in 1922).

== Geography ==
The terrain of Howard consists of low rolling hills. The leveled hilltops are mostly used for agriculture. The Upper Loup River flows southeastward into the county near its NW corner, turning eastward to flow toward its junction with Middle Loup River. The Middle Loup River flows northeastward into the county near its SW corner, turning north to join with the Upper Loup River near the county midpoint to form the Loup River, flowing eastward into Merrick County. The county has a total area of 576 square miles (1,490 km^{2}), of which 569 square miles (1,470 km^{2}) is land and 6.3 square miles (16 km^{2}) (1.1%) is water.

=== Major highways ===
- U.S. Highway 281
- Nebraska Highway 11
- Nebraska Highway 22
- Nebraska Highway 58
- Nebraska Highway 92

=== Adjacent counties ===
- Merrick County – east
- Hall County – south
- Buffalo County – southwest
- Sherman County – west
- Greeley County – north

=== Protected areas ===
- Loup Junction State Wildlife Management Area

== History ==
=== Early settlement and organization ===
Prior to European settlement, the region that comprises Howard County was primarily home to the Pawnee people, with the Sioux occasionally traversing the area during hunting expeditions. A major Native American gathering place known as Indian Hill was located near present-day Cushing until the tribes were relocated in 1870.

The concept of organizing a settlement originated in early 1870 when James N. Paul, a government surveyor, explored the Loup River Valley on a hunting expedition with Major Frank North, the chief of the Pawnee scouts. Struck by the area's natural layout, James Paul later convinced his brother and fellow surveyor, Nicholas J. Paul, to establish a colony in the valley. On March 1, 1871, the Nebraska Legislature officially defined the boundaries of Howard County, carving it out from the northern section of Hall County. The county was named in honor of Civil War General Oliver Otis Howard, an abolitionist who served as the head of the Freedmen's Bureau.

In March 1871, the Paul brothers brought a group of 31 pioneers from Grand Island to stake homestead claims near what would become the county seat of St. Paul. To facilitate settlement into the interior, the pioneers constructed a cottonwood bridge across the Loup River by June 1871. The first county election took place on October 7, 1871, with only 54 residents casting ballots. Although the townsite committee initially pulled the name "Athens" out of a hat, the name was rejected due to an existing post office of the same name in the state. Senator Phineas Hitchcock subsequently suggested "St. Paul" to honor the founding Paul brothers. St. Paul officially secured its role as the permanent county seat during a contested election against the rival village of Dannebrog on October 13, 1874, winning by a vote of 226 to 208.

=== Immigration and growth ===
The late 19th century brought rapid, ethnically distinct immigration waves to Howard County, which grew to over 4,000 residents by 1880 and exceeded 10,000 by 1900. The southwestern portion of the county was heavily settled by Danish immigrants. In May 1871, Lars Hannibal led members of the Danish Land and Homestead Company from Wisconsin to establish a colony along Oak Creek. Named Dannebrog after the national flag of Denmark, the colony preserved a dense Danish heritage alongside the neighboring hamlets of Nysted and Dannevirke. In 1989, the Nebraska Legislature designated Dannebrog as Nebraska's Danish Capital.

Concurrently, a substantial number of Polish and Czech pioneers populated other areas of the county. Polish families settled largely around the areas of Posen (later renamed Farwell) under the guidance of land agents like John Barzynski, while Czech immigrants established prominent farming communities in St. Paul, Elba, and Cotesfield. The arrival of the Union Pacific Railroad and the Chicago, Burlington and Quincy Railroad in the 1880s connected these farming hubs to larger municipal markets, turning Howard County into a highly productive agricultural center for wheat, corn, and livestock.

=== 20th Century (1900-1999) ===
During the early decades of the 20th century, Howard County transitioned from a frontier settlement into a modernized commercial and manufacturing hub. Downtown St. Paul underwent a architectural shift, replacing its original single-story wooden false-front buildings with two-story brick structures, and paving its dirt thoroughfares with brick during the early 1920s. The county seat became home to diverse light industries, including a brick manufacturing plant, a broom factory, a canning facility, a cigar factory, and two large flour mills—one of which formulated the region's first commercial self-rising flour. Agricultural innovation expanded in 1901 when Nebraska's first commercial poultry hatchery opened in Cushing; the operation relocated to St. Paul in 1922 and sustained production until 1956.

Howard County gained national prominence through several notable 20th-century figures. Hall of Fame Major League Baseball pitcher Grover Cleveland Alexander, born near Elba in 1887, maintained his roots in the county throughout his career, which included winning 373 games. Following World War II, St. Paul native General Clarence S. Irvine achieved military distinction by engineering long-distance endurance flight records using the B-29 Superfortress airframe. In the mid-20th century, local restaurateur Dorothy Lynch developed a signature sweet-and-spicy salad dressing at the Legion Club in St. Paul; the recipe was subsequently patented, mass-manufactured, and achieved nationwide retail distribution. Like much of rural Nebraska, the county experienced significant economic hardships during the Great Depression and the concurrent Dust Bowl of the 1930s, which initiated a multi-decade consolidation of family farms and a gradual population contraction from its 1910 peak of 10,783 residents down to 6,807 by 1970.

=== 2026 EF3 tornado ===
On May 17, 2026, a high-end EF3 tornado severely impacted southeastern Howard County. The tornado was part of a larger regional severe weather outbreak across eastern Nebraska, which generated three total tornadoes tracked by the National Weather Service office in Hastings.

The tornado initially touched down at 5:04 p.m. CDT southwest of the village of St. Libory near 7th Avenue and Denton Road. Moving northeastward, the tornado rapidly intensified upon crossing U.S. Highway 281 north of the Highway 58 intersection. It carved a 6-mile-long (9.7 km) path across the county, reaching a maximum width of 350 yards (320 m) before lifting near the Merrick County line at 5:15 p.m. CDT.

According to the National Weather Service damage survey, the tornado produced peak winds estimated at 160 miles per hour (260 km/h). The most severe destruction occurred in a rural housing development north of St. Libory, where four homes were completely destroyed or leveled. Multiple detached garages and outbuildings were obliterated, while agricultural fields suffered heavy losses, including shredded shelterbelts, twisted grain bins, and rolled irrigation pivot systems. Howard County Emergency Management Director Allen Wilshusen reported that first responders and storm spotters successfully completed a rapid rescue of two residents who were briefly trapped in the debris. Despite the severe structural devastation, no fatalities or major injuries were reported.

On May 18, Nebraska Governor Jim Pillen and State Senator Fred Meyer toured the damaged properties alongside local first responders to coordinate state recovery resources. The first floor of the Howard County Courthouse in St. Paul and the St. Libory Fire Hall were established as emergency collection points to support displaced families.

== Demographics ==
Historical population
Census	Pop.	Note	%±
1880	4,391		—
1890	9,430		114.8%
1900	10,343		9.7%
1910	10,783		4.3%
1920	10,739		−0.4%
1930	10,020		−6.7%
1940	8,422		−15.9%
1950	7,226		−14.2%
1960	6,541		−9.5%
1970	6,807		4.1%
1980	6,773		−0.5%
1990	6,057		−10.6%
2000	6,567		8.4%
2010	6,274		−4.5%
2020	6,475		3.2%
2025 (est.)	6,538	▲	1.0%
US Decennial Census; 1790-1960 1900-1990; 1990-2000 2010

=== 2020 census ===
As of the 2020 census, the county had a population of 6,475. The median age was 43.0 years. 24.6% of residents were under the age of 18 and 21.8% of residents were 65 years of age or older. For every 100 females there were 101.0 males, and for every 100 females age 18 and over there were 98.6 males age 18 and over.

The racial makeup of the county was 95.8% White, 0.2% Black or African American, 0.4% American Indian and Alaska Native, 0.2% Asian, 0.0% Native Hawaiian and Pacific Islander, 0.7% from some other race, and 2.7% from two or more races. Hispanic or Latino residents of any race comprised 2.3% of the population.

0.0% of residents lived in urban areas, while 100.0% lived in rural areas.

There were 2,616 households in the county, of which 29.8% had children under the age of 18 living with them and 19.1% had a female householder with no spouse or partner present. About 27.2% of all households were made up of individuals and 13.5% had someone living alone who was 65 years of age or older.

There were 2,865 housing units, of which 8.7% were vacant. Among occupied housing units, 79.5% were owner-occupied and 20.5% were renter-occupied. The homeowner vacancy rate was 1.6% and the rental vacancy rate was 2.0%.

=== 2000 census ===
As of the 2000 United States census, there were 6,567 people, 2,546 households, and 1,797 families in the county. The population density was 12 people per square mile (4.6 people/km^{2}). There were 2,782 housing units at an average density of 5 units per square mile (1.9/km^{2}). The racial makeup of the county was 98.69% White, 0.30% Black or African American, 0.24% Native American, 0.09% Asian, 0.03% Pacific Islander, 0.32% from other races, and 0.32% from two or more races. 1.01% of the population were Hispanic or Latino of any race.

There were 2,546 households, out of which 33.80% had children under the age of 18 living with them, 61.00% were married couples living together, 6.20% had a female householder with no husband present, and 29.40% were non-families. 26.00% of all households were made up of individuals, and 15.00% had someone living alone who was 65 years of age or older. The average household size was 2.56 and the average family size was 3.09.

The county population contained 28.30% under the age of 18, 6.60% from 18 to 24, 25.30% from 25 to 44, 22.60% from 45 to 64, and 17.10% who were 65 years of age or older. The median age was 38 years. For every 100 females, there were 101.00 males. For every 100 females age 18 and over, there were 97.30 males.

The median income for a household in the county was $33,305, and the median income for a family was $40,259. Males had a median income of $27,270 versus $19,587 for females. The per capita income for the county was $15,535. About 8.50% of families and 11.70% of the population were below the poverty line, including 14.30% of those under age 18 and 15.00% of those age 65 or over.

== Communities ==
=== City ===
- St. Paul (county seat)

=== Villages ===
- Cotesfield
- Cushing
- Dannebrog
- Elba
- Farwell
- Howard City
- Wolbach (part)

=== Census-designated place ===
- St. Libory

=== Unincorporated communities ===
- Dannevirke
- Nysted

== Politics ==
Howard County voters have usually voted Republican for several decades. In only one national election since 1948 has the county selected the Democratic Party candidate.

United States presidential election results for Howard County, Nebraska
Year	Republican		Democratic		Third party(ies)	
Year	No.	%	No.	%	No.	%
1900	908	40.48%	1,283	57.20%	52	2.32%
1904	1,259	56.97%	476	21.54%	475	21.49%
1908	977	39.35%	1,435	57.79%	71	2.86%
1912	431	19.57%	1,118	50.77%	653	29.65%
1916	698	28.08%	1,695	68.18%	93	3.74%
1920	1,508	50.76%	1,311	44.13%	152	5.12%
1924	1,091	31.58%	1,434	41.51%	930	26.92%
1928	1,937	46.60%	2,197	52.85%	23	0.55%
1932	734	17.05%	3,409	79.17%	163	3.79%
1936	1,223	27.21%	3,148	70.05%	123	2.74%
1940	1,696	43.11%	2,238	56.89%	0	0.00%
1944	1,556	43.25%	2,042	56.75%	0	0.00%
1948	1,133	37.44%	1,893	62.56%	0	0.00%
1952	2,115	59.23%	1,456	40.77%	0	0.00%
1956	1,701	54.00%	1,449	46.00%	0	0.00%
1960	1,676	52.47%	1,518	47.53%	0	0.00%
1964	1,019	33.48%	2,025	66.52%	0	0.00%
1968	1,256	51.37%	1,003	41.02%	186	7.61%
1972	1,691	64.15%	945	35.85%	0	0.00%
1976	1,362	49.78%	1,316	48.10%	58	2.12%
1980	1,971	66.36%	789	26.57%	210	7.07%
1984	1,899	67.68%	887	31.61%	20	0.71%
1988	1,526	55.63%	1,186	43.24%	31	1.13%
1992	1,138	39.65%	778	27.11%	954	33.24%
1996	1,294	50.10%	853	33.02%	436	16.88%
2000	1,760	62.26%	955	33.78%	112	3.96%
2004	2,020	67.81%	900	30.21%	59	1.98%
2008	1,847	61.65%	1,083	36.15%	66	2.20%
2012	1,890	65.85%	914	31.85%	66	2.30%
2016	2,284	76.29%	544	18.17%	166	5.54%
2020	2,786	79.35%	648	18.46%	77	2.19%
2024	2,868	80.43%	642	18.00%	56	1.57%

== See also ==
- National Register of Historic Places listings in Howard County, Nebraska
