= Dannevirke (disambiguation) =

Dannevirke is a town in the Tararua District, North island of New Zealand.

Dannevirke may also refer to:

- Dannevirke, Nebraska, a community in the United States
- Danevirke, a system of Danish fortifications in Schleswig-Holstein
- Dannewerk, a municipality in Amt Haddeby in Schleswig-Flensburg District, Germany
