= St. Libory =

St. Libory may refer to one of the following places in the United States:

- St. Libory, Illinois
- St. Libory, Nebraska
