= Grand Island metropolitan area =

Grand Island Metropolitan Area
- Metropolitan Statistical Area
- Grand Island, NE Metropolitan Statistical Area
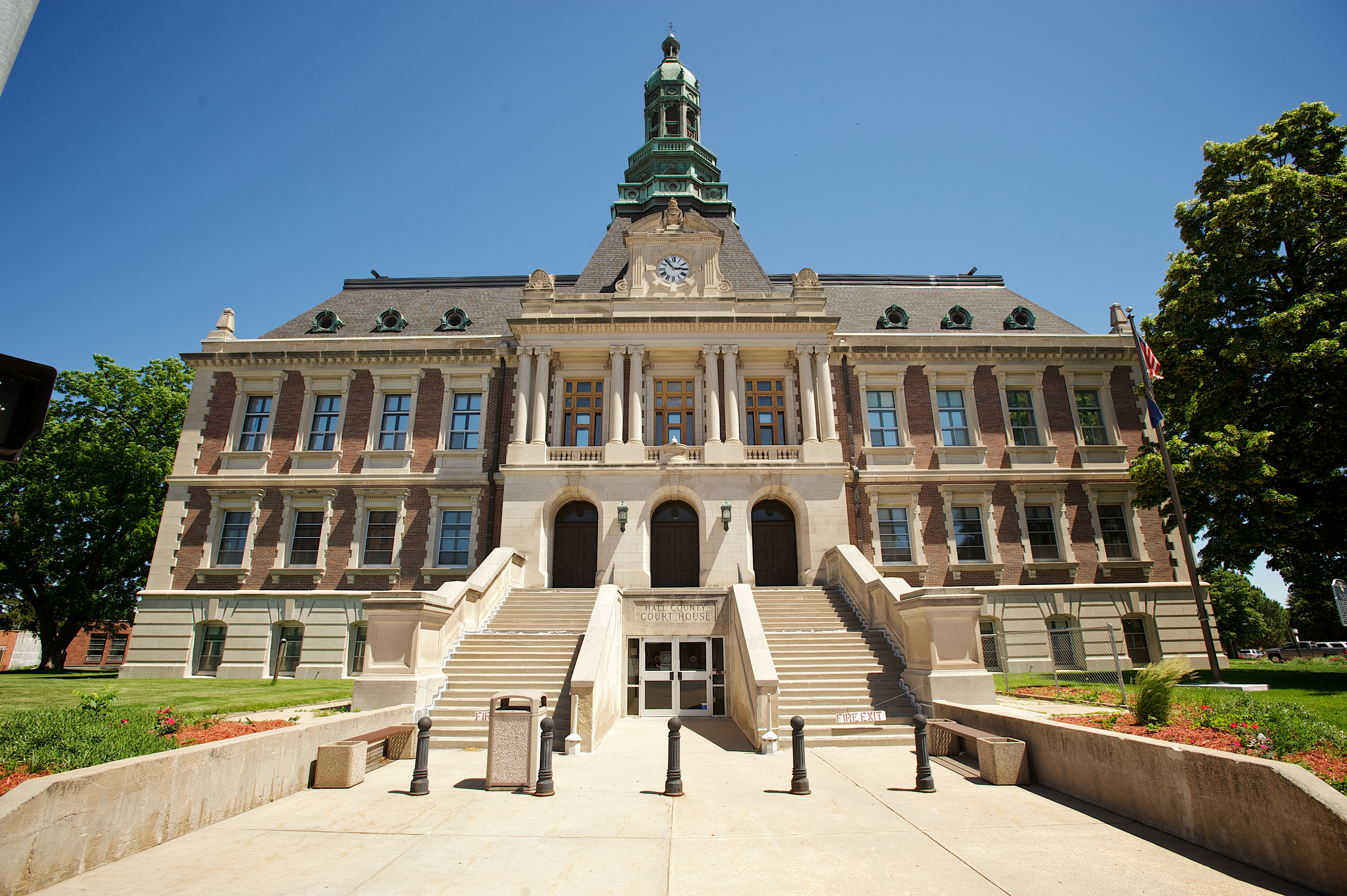
- Hall County Courthouse in Grand Island, June 2014
Interactive Map of Grand Island, NE MSA
City of Grand Island
Grand Island, NE MSA
- Country: United States
- State: Nebraska
- Largest city: Grand Island
- Time zone: UTC−6 (CST)
  - Summer (DST): UTC−5 (CDT)

The Grand Island metropolitan area, as defined by the United States Census Bureau, is an area consisting of four counties in Nebraska, anchored by the city of Grand Island. It was upgraded from a micropolitan area and Hamilton County was added in 2012 when Grand Island's population surpassed 50,000.

As of the 2020 census, the Grand Island Metropolitan Area had a population of 86,467

== Counties ==
- Hall
- Howard
- Merrick
- Hamilton

== Communities ==
- Places with 50,000 or more inhabitants
  - Grand Island (Principal City)
- Places with 1,000 to 5,000 inhabitants
  - Aurora
  - Central City
  - St. Paul
  - Wood River
- Places with 500 to 1,000 inhabitants
  - Alda
  - Cairo
  - Doniphan
- Places with less than 500 inhabitants
  - Chapman
  - Clarks
  - Cotesfield
  - Cushing
  - Dannebrog
  - Elba
  - Farwell
  - Giltner
  - Hampton
  - Hordville
  - Howard City
  - Marquette
  - Palmer
  - Phillips
  - Silver Creek
  - Stockham
- Unincorporated places
  - St. Libory

== Demographics ==
As of the census of 2000, there were 68,305 people, 26,111 households, and 18,190 families residing within this area. The racial makeup of this area was 90.79% White, 0.34% African American, 0.28% Native American, 0.89% Asian, 0.11% Pacific Islander, 6.53% from other races, and 1.06% from two or more races. Hispanic or Latino of any race were 11.32% of the population.

The median income for a household in this area was $35,079, and the median income for a family was $41,317. Males had a median income of $27,809 versus $19,997 for females. The per capita income for this area was $16,293.

== See also ==
- Nebraska census statistical areas
