= Leander Herron =

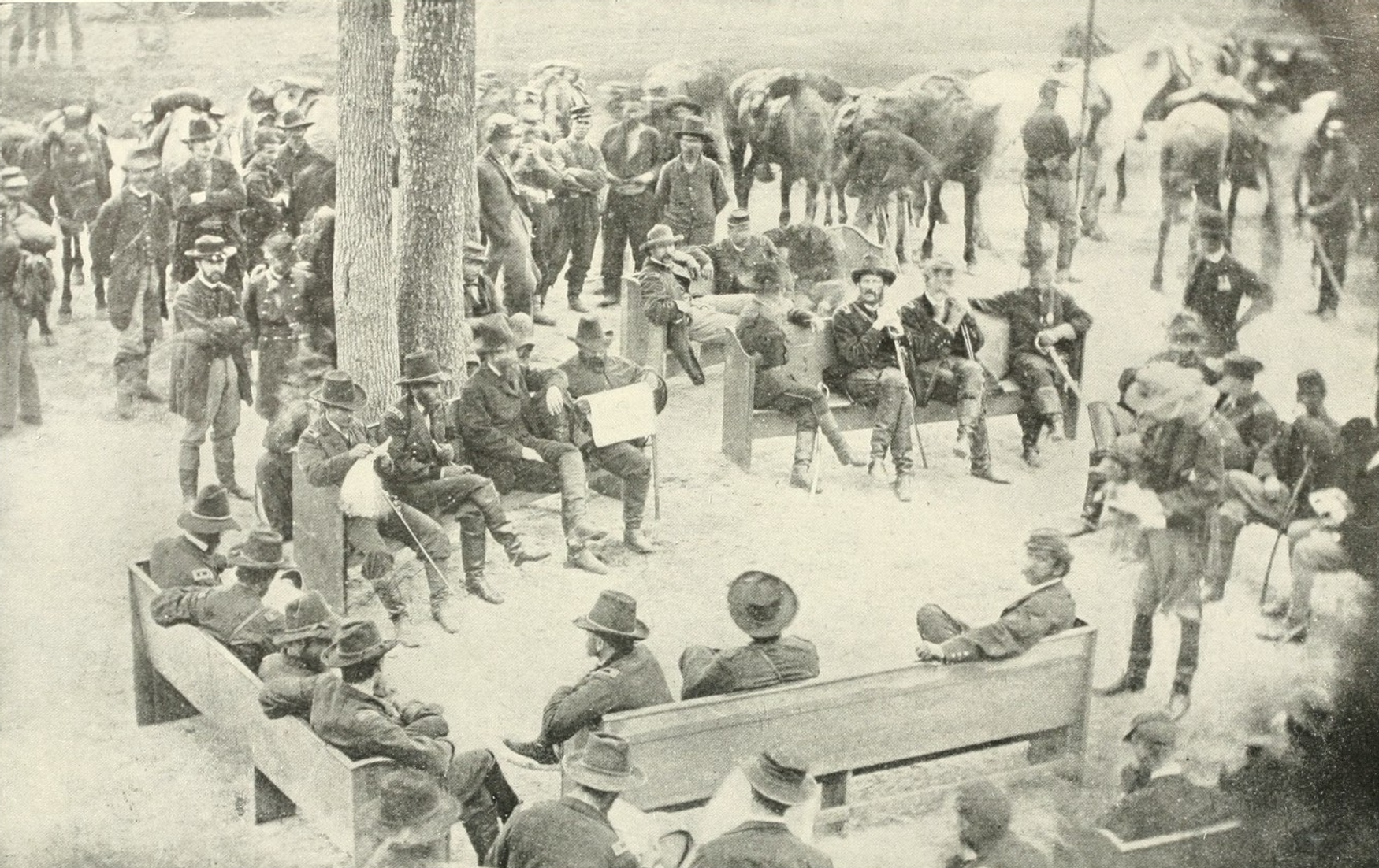
- Herron is in the left background [Partially seen] standing sidewards
- Born: December 29, 1846; Fallsington, Pennsylvania, US
- Died: April 5, 1937 (aged 90)
- Burial place: St. Paul, Nebraska, US
- Relatives: George and Mary Herron
- Military career
- Allegiance: United States
- Branch: Army
- Rank: Corporal
- Units: Company C, 83rd Pennsylvania Infantry
- Conflicts: American Civil War
- Awards: Medal of Honor

Leander T. "Lee" Herron (1846–1937) was a Corporal in the United States Army who received the Medal of Honor for heroism near Fort Dodge, Kansas on September 2, 1868.

== Biography ==
=== Early life ===
Leander Herron was born on December 29, 1846, in Fallsington, Pennsylvania. He was the son of Dr. George and Mary (Merrick) Herron.

His father was a medical doctor in Philadelphia and practiced medicine before moving to Bucks County, Pennsylvania where he continued practicing his profession. Herron was only two years old when his mother died and he was placed in the care of his aunt. He attended the public schools of Fallsington until he moved to Hannahville, Canal Township, in Vanango County, Pennsylvania.

From 1858 to 1862 Leander worked on a packet boat on the canal between Erie and Pittsburgh.

=== Civil War service ===
When Fort Sumter was attacked at the beginning of the American Civil War, Herron wanted to join the Union Army, but was rejected because he was only 14 at the time.

On December 10, 1863, shortly before his 17th birthday, Herron enlisted in Company C, 83rd Pennsylvania Infantry in New Brighton, Pennsylvania. When he enlisted, he was 5 feet 1 inch tall and weighed slightly more than 100 pounds. He served with the 83rd Pennsylvania in the Siege of Petersburg and at Appomattox Court House. He was mustered out with his regiment on June 28, 1865.

After the war he enlisted in Company A of the 3rd Infantry and was stationed at Fort Larned in Kansas.

=== Medal of Honor action ===
Herron left Fort Larned on the evening of September 1, 1868 to deliver mail to Fort Dodge - about 75 miles away. En route, he passed a labor detail of four soldiers from Fort Dodge gathering wood for use at the fort. The following day, Leander was supposed to make the return trip. Corporal Patrick Boyle of the 7th Cavalry accompanied Herron.

After traveling about 12 miles, they heard gunfire. The labor detail Herron encountered the night before was being attacked by Indians. With pistols drawn, Herron and Boyle rode directly through the attackers and reached the imperiled soldiers. Herron took charge and the six men fought from behind a wagon confronting about fifty Indians. Herron decided to send Boyle to Fort Dodge for re-enforcements.

The five remaining soldiers fought off repeated assaults through the night. As the night passed, the supply of ammunition diminished and all the soldiers, other than Herron, were wounded. Finally, Boyle and the reinforcements from Fort Dodge arrived. The attackers fled and the labor detail was saved.

He did not receive the Medal of Honor until 1919 – 51 years after his heroic actions. He was the first Nebraskan to receive the Medal of Honor.

=== Later life ===
After being discharged from the Army in 1870, Herron settled in St. Paul, Nebraska.

In 1897 he claimed to be in a series of famous photographs taken on May 21, 1864, of General Ulysses S. Grant and his staff at Massaponax Church in Hanover County, Virginia.

On 11 November 1921, Herron served as one of the official mourners at the burial of the Unknown Soldier of World War I in Arlington National Cemetery.

In the 1930s Herron made a recorded interview with Captain Eddie Rickenbacker, who was also a Medal of Honor recipient, for the Chevrolet Chronicles radio show. In the recording Herron recounts the actions for which he received the Medal of Honor. The recording is now available at the Fort Larned National Historic Site website.

Herron was a member of the Grand Army of the Republic and the Legion of Valor.

Corporal Leander Herron died on April 5, 1937.

== Awards ==
- Medal of Honor
- Civil War Campaign Medal
- Indian Campaign Medal

=== Medal of Honor citation ===
While detailed as mail courier from the fort, voluntarily went to the assistance of a party of 4 enlisted men, who were attacked by about 50 Indians at some distance from the fort and remained with them until the party was relieved.

== See also ==
- List of Medal of Honor recipients for the Indian Wars
- 3rd Infantry Regiment (United States)
