= Farwell, Nebraska =

- Village
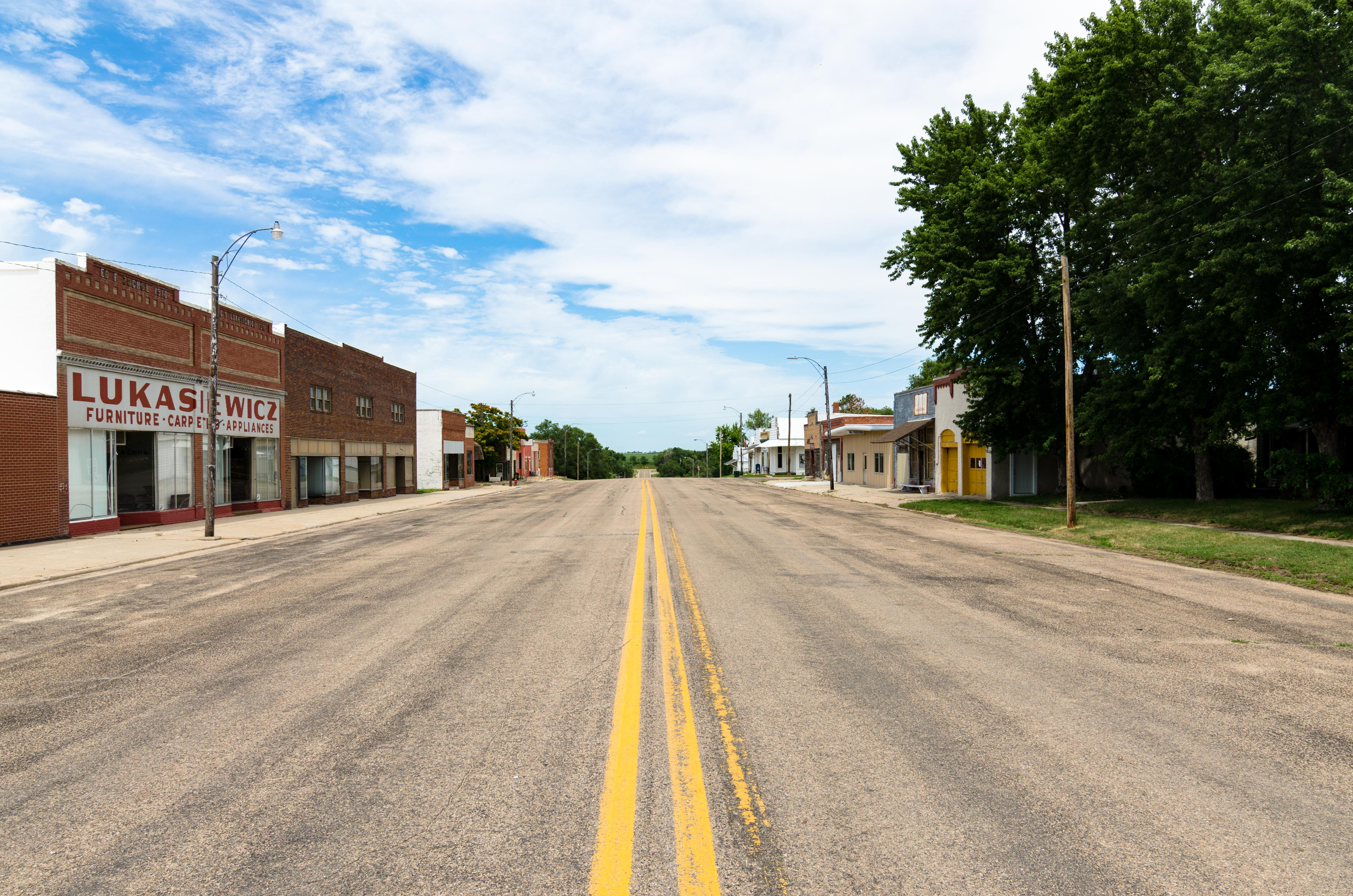
- Motto: "Preserving The Past And Promoting The Future"
- Location of Farwell, Nebraska
- Coordinates: 41°12′56″N 98°37′41″W
- Country: United States
- State: Nebraska
- County: Howard

Area
  - Total: 0.17 sq mi (0.45 km^{2})
  - Land: 0.17 sq mi (0.45 km^{2})
  - Water: 0 sq mi (0.00 km^{2})
- Elevation: 2,001 ft (610 m)

Population (2020)
  - Total: 138
  - Density: 798.3/sq mi (308.24/km^{2})
- Time zone: UTC-6 (Central (CST))
  - Summer (DST): UTC-5 (CDT)
- ZIP code: 68838
- Area code: 308
- FIPS code: 31-16760
- GNIS feature ID: 2398866
- Website: www.farwellne.com

Farwell is a village in Howard County, Nebraska, United States. As of the 2020 census, Farwell had a population of 138. It is part of the Grand Island, Nebraska Micropolitan Statistical Area.

== History ==
Farwell was originally called Posen, and under the latter name was established in 1887 by a colony of Polish settlers. Some incoming Danish settlers soon found the name to their distaste, so in 1889 it was changed to Farwell, the Danish word for "good-bye". Farwell was incorporated as a village in 1895.

== Geography ==
According to the United States Census Bureau, the village has a total area of 0.17 square miles (0.44 km^{2}), all land.

== Demographics ==
Historical population
| Census | Pop. | Note | %± |
|---|---|---|---|
| 1900 | 130 | | — |
| 1910 | 246 | | 89.2% |
| 1920 | 387 | | 57.3% |
| 1930 | 230 | | −40.6% |
| 1940 | 200 | | −13.0% |
| 1950 | 172 | | −14.0% |
| 1960 | 137 | | −20.3% |
| 1970 | 172 | | 25.5% |
| 1980 | 165 | | −4.1% |
| 1990 | 152 | | −7.9% |
| 2000 | 148 | | −2.6% |
| 2010 | 122 | | −17.6% |
| 2020 | 138 | | 13.1% |
U.S. Decennial Census

=== 2010 census ===
As of the census of 2010, there were 122 people, 57 households, and 35 families residing in the village. The population density was 717.6 inhabitants per square mile (277.1/km^{2}). There were 67 housing units at an average density of 394.1 per square mile (152.2/km^{2}). The racial makeup of the village was 98.4% White, 0.8% Asian, and 0.8% from other races. Hispanic or Latino of any race were 3.3% of the population.

There were 57 households, of which 22.8% had children under the age of 18 living with them, 54.4% were married couples living together, 3.5% had a female householder with no husband present, 3.5% had a male householder with no wife present, and 38.6% were non-families. 35.1% of all households were made up of individuals, and 15.8% had someone living alone who was 65 years of age or older. The average household size was 2.14 and the average family size was 2.77.

The median age in the village was 39.7 years. 22.1% of residents were under the age of 18; 3.4% were between the ages of 18 and 24; 30.3% were from 25 to 44; 24.6% were from 45 to 64; and 19.7% were 65 years of age or older. The gender makeup of the village was 52.5% male and 47.5% female.

=== 2000 census ===
As of the census of 2000, there were 148 people, 63 households, and 48 families residing in the village. The population density was 833.8 inhabitants per square mile (321.9/km^{2}). There were 68 housing units at an average density of 383.1 per square mile (147.9/km^{2}). The racial makeup of the village was 97.97% White, 0.68% African American, 0.68% from other races, and 0.68% from two or more races. Hispanic or Latino of any race were 2.03% of the population.

There were 63 households, out of which 33.3% had children under the age of 18 and living with them, 69.8% were married couples living together, and 23.8% were non-families. 23.8% of all households were made up of individuals, and 9.5% had someone living alone who was 65 years of age or older. The average household size was 2.35 and the average family size was 2.71.

In the village, the population was spread out, with 25.0% under the age of 18, 4.7% from 18 to 24, 23.6% from 25 to 44, 27.7% from 45 to 64, and 18.9% who were 65 years of age or older. The median age was 42 years. For every 100 females, there were 100.0 males. For every 100 females age 18 and over, there were 94.7 males.

As of 2000 the median income for a household in the village was $29,063, and the median income for a family was $29,792. Males had a median income of $28,125 versus $17,500 for females. The per capita income for the village was $14,304. There were 6.1% of families and 7.1% of the population living below the poverty line, including no under eighteens and 33.3% of those over 64.

== Notable persons ==
- Frank B. Morrison, 31st Governor of Nebraska
