= Elba, Nebraska =

- Village
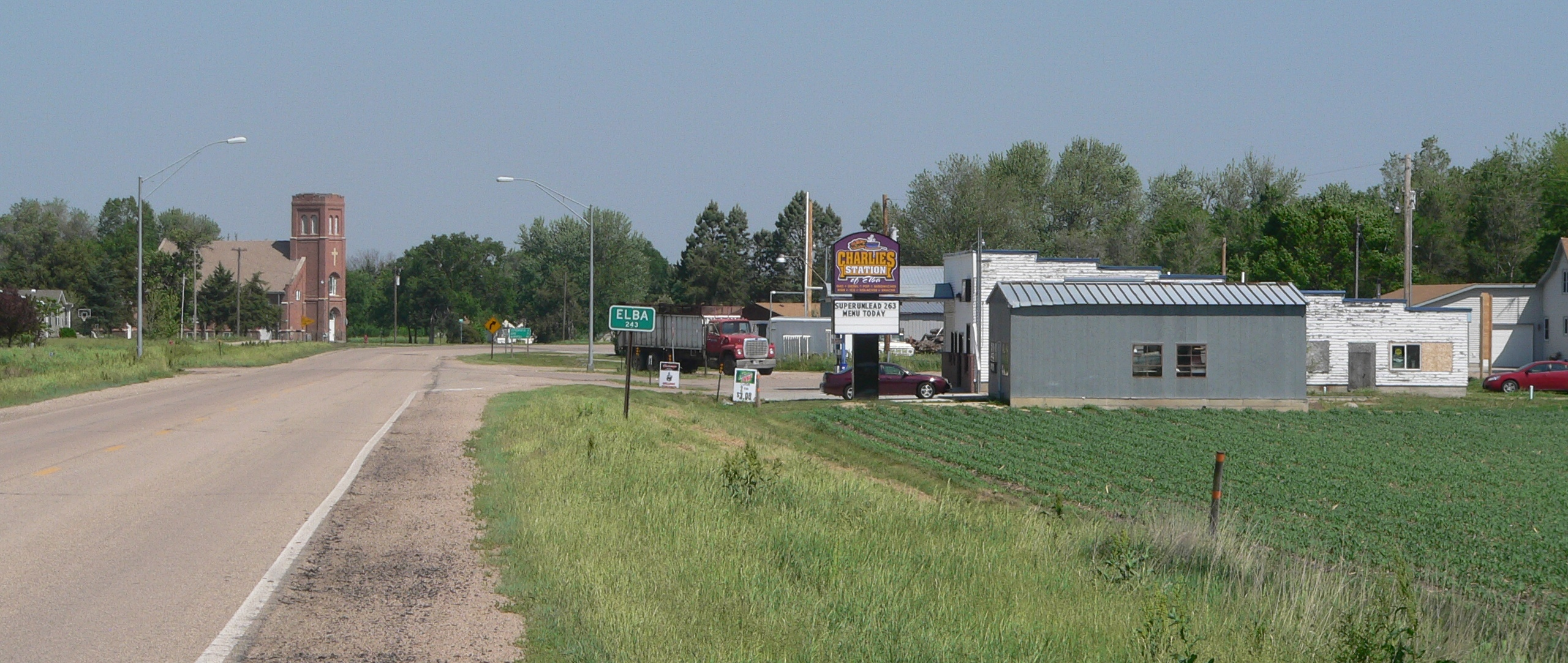
- Elba, seen from the southeast along Nebraska Highway 11

- Location of Elba, Nebraska
- Coordinates: 41°17′07″N 98°34′09″W
- Country: United States
- State: Nebraska
- County: Howard

Area
  - Total: 0.37 sq mi (0.95 km^{2})
  - Land: 0.37 sq mi (0.95 km^{2})
  - Water: 0 sq mi (0.00 km^{2})
- Elevation: 1,864 ft (568 m)

Population (2020)
  - Total: 192
  - Density: 523.5/sq mi (202.11/km^{2})
- Time zone: UTC-6 (Central (CST))
  - Summer (DST): UTC-5 (CDT)
- ZIP code: 68835
- Area code: 308
- FIPS code: 31-14555
- GNIS feature ID: 2398793

Elba is a village in Howard County, Nebraska, United States. As of the 2020 census, Elba had a population of 192. It is part of the Grand Island, Nebraska Micropolitan Statistical Area.

== History ==
Elba was platted in 1882 when the Union Pacific Railroad was extended to that point. A meander of the river nearby was thought to resemble an elbow, hence the name Elba. Elba was incorporated as a village in 1886.

== Geography ==
According to the United States Census Bureau, the village has a total area of 0.37 square miles (0.96 km^{2}), all land.

== Demographics ==
Historical population
Census	Pop.	Note	%±
1900	257		—
1910	302		17.5%
1920	276		−8.6%
1930	286		3.6%
1940	270		−5.6%
1950	216		−20.0%
1960	184		−14.8%
1970	211		14.7%
1980	218		3.3%
1990	196		−10.1%
2000	243		24.0%
2010	215		−11.5%
2020	192		−10.7%
U.S. Decennial Census

=== 2010 census ===
As of the census of 2010, there were 215 people, 98 households, and 55 families residing in the village. The population density was 581.1 inhabitants per square mile (224.4/km^{2}). There were 115 housing units at an average density of 310.8 per square mile (120.0/km^{2}). The racial makeup of the village was 96.7% White, 0.5% African American, and 2.8% from two or more races. Hispanic or Latino of any race were 2.3% of the population.

There were 0 households, of which 30.6% had children under the age of 18 living with them, 42.9% were married couples living together, 7.1% had a female householder with no husband present, 6.1% had a male householder with no wife present, and 43.9% were non-families. 39.8% of all households were made up of individuals, and 10.2% had someone living alone who was 65 years of age or older. The average household size was 2.19 and the average family size was 2.96.

The median age in the village was 39.3 years. 25.1% of residents were under the age of 18; 7% were between the ages of 18 and 24; 25% were from 25 to 44; 29.2% were from 45 to 64; and 13.5% were 65 years of age or older. The gender makeup of the village was 50.7% male and 49.3% female.

=== 2000 census ===
As of the census of 2000, there were 243 people, 102 households, and 62 families residing in the village. The population density was 663.7 inhabitants per square mile (256.3/km^{2}). There were 112 housing units at an average density of 305.9 per square mile (118.1/km^{2}). The racial makeup of the village was 98.35% White, 0.41% Native American, 1.23% from other races. Hispanic or Latino of any race were 0.82% of the population.

There were 102 households, out of which 32.4% had children under the age of 18 living with them, 52.0% were married couples living together, 7.8% had a female householder with no husband present, and 39.2% were non-families. 34.3% of all households were made up of individuals, and 14.7% had someone living alone who was 65 years of age or older. The average household size was 2.38 and the average family size was 3.11.

In the village, the population was spread out, with 28.4% under the age of 18, 7.0% from 18 to 24, 27.6% from 25 to 44, 20.2% from 45 to 64, and 16.9% who were 65 years of age or older. The median age was 36 years. For every 100 females, there were 99.2 males. For every 100 females age 18 and over, there were 109.6 males.

As of 2000 the median income for a household in the village was $28,750, and the median income for a family was $35,000. Males had a median income of $23,854 versus $18,194 for females. The per capita income for the village was $14,993. About 10.6% of families and 16.7% of the population were below the poverty line, including 25.5% of those under the age of eighteen and 21.6% of those 65 or over.

== Notable person ==
- Grover Cleveland Alexander - Major League Baseball pitcher, inducted into the Baseball Hall of Fame in 1938.
