= Jean Potts =

American novelist

Jean Catherine Potts
- Born: November 17, 1910; St. Paul, Nebraska
- Died: November 10, 1999 (aged 88); New York
- Occupation: Novelist
- Years active: 1910–1999
- Known for: Mystery novels
- Notable work: Go, Lovely Rose, The Evil Wish
- Awards: Edgar Award

Jean Catherine Potts (November 17, 1910 – November 10, 1999) was an American award-winning mystery novelist.

== Early life ==
Potts was born in St. Paul, Nebraska, graduated from St. Paul High School, studied at the Denver Women's College, and graduated from Nebraska Wesleyan University.

== Career ==
Potts worked as a journalist in St. Paul before moving to New York where she continued her writing. Her stories appeared in various magazines including Ellery Queen, Alfred Hitchcock's Mystery Magazine, and Woman's Day.

She died in New York in 1999.

== Works ==
Among Potts' published writings are:

- (1954) Go, Lovely Rose in libraries (WorldCat catalog)
- (1955) Death of a Stray Cat in libraries (WorldCat catalog)
- (1957) The Man With the Cane in libraries (WorldCat catalog)
- (1962) The Evil Wish in libraries (WorldCat catalog)
- (1965) The Only Good Secretary in libraries (WorldCat catalog)
- (1966) The Footsteps on the Stairs in libraries (WorldCat catalog)
- (1968) The Little Lie in libraries (WorldCat catalog)

== Awards ==
Potts won the 1954 Edgar Award for Best First Novel for Go, Lovely Rose, and an Edgar Award nomination for The Evil Wish.

== See also ==
- Margaret Millar
- Charlotte Armstrong
