= Clarence Irvine =

United States Air Force lieutenant general

Clarence S. Irvine
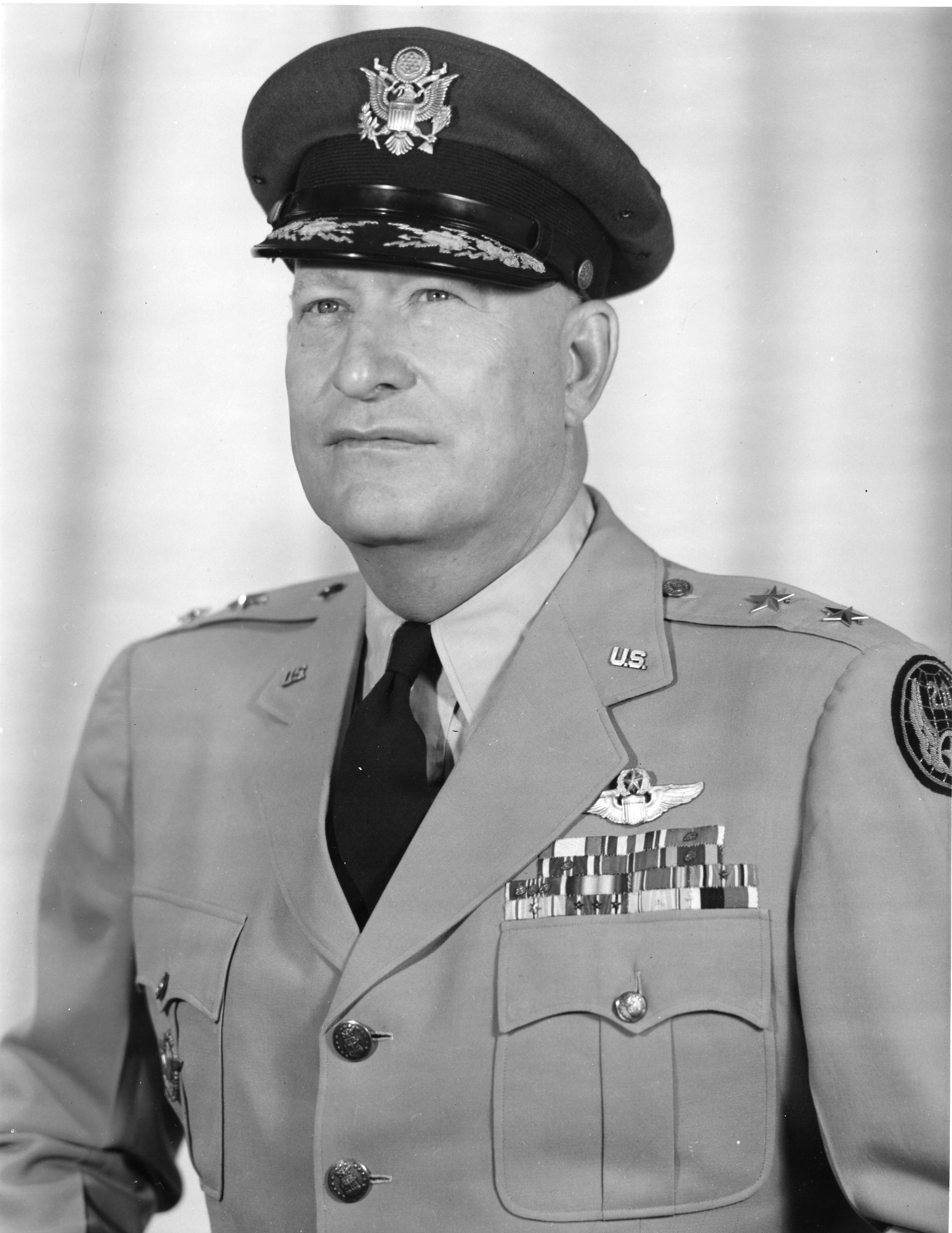
- Born: 16 December 1898; St. Paul, Nebraska
- Died: 7 September 1975 (aged 76); Los Angeles, California
- Burial place: Arlington National Cemetery
- Military career
- Allegiance: United States
- Branch: United States Army (1919–1947); United States Air Force (1947–1959)
- Service years: 1919–1959
- Rank: Lieutenant general
- Service number: O-11293, 296A
- Commands: 509th Bomb Wing; 7th Bomb Wing; 19th Air Division
- Conflicts: World War I; World War II; Bombing of Japan; Occupation of Japan
- Awards: Legion of Merit (2); Army Distinguished Service Medal; Silver Star; Distinguished Flying Cross (2); Air Medal (2); Bronze Star Medal

Clarence Shortridge Irvine (16 December 1898 – 7 September 1975) was a United States Air Force (USAF) lieutenant general who was involved in the development and deployment of the Boeing B-29 Superfortress, Convair B-36A Peacemaker, Boeing B-47 Stratojet, Boeing B-52 Stratofortress and the Rockwell B-1 Lancer bomber. He flew aircraft in several films, including Wings and Hell's Angels.

== Early life and career ==
Clarence Shortridge Irvine was born in St. Paul, Nebraska, on 16 December 1898, the son of James Irvine Jr. and Margaret Jane Welsh. He attended the St. Paul College and the University of Nebraska.

Irvine joined the U.S. Army Air Service as a private on 4 November 1918, shortly before World War I ended. He served as an airplane mechanic and reached the rank of sergeant first class. He attended the Air Service pilot's school at March Field, California, in 1920, and the Air Service Pursuit School at Kelly Field, Texas, the following year. He was commissioned as a second lieutenant in United States Army Air Service Reserve on 15 October 1921. That year he took part in Billy Mitchell's demonstration of anti-ship bombing.

Irvine was promoted to first Lieutenant on 6 July 1925 but accepted a regular commission as a second lieutenant in the United States Army Air Corps on 30 June 1926. He spent the next four years as a gunnery and engineering officer at Selfridge Field, Michigan, and Clark Field in the Philippine Islands, and was the top aerial gunner in the Air Corps for three years running. He flew in several films about aviation, including Wings, which won the academy award for best picture, and Hell's Angels.

In 1930, Irvine was posted to Wright Field, Ohio, the heart if the Air Corps's research and development activities. He completed the Air Corps Technical School maintenance engineering course in 1935 and graduated from the Air Corps Engineering School in 1933 and the Army Industrial College in 1939. On 1 August of that year he set an international altitude record of 34,025 feet (10,371 m) in a Boeing YB-17 Flying Fortress carrying a payload of 500 kilograms. He was promoted to captain on 30 June 1936 and major on 30 June 1940.

== World War II ==
At Wright Field, Irvine was a key figure in the four-engine bomber production program. He was the assistant chief of the inspection section and chief of the industrial section at Wright Field from 11 May 1940 to 10 May 1941, and the assistant chief of the planning section and chief of the production control section at Wright Field from 11 May 1941 to 1 June 1942, when he became the executive officer of the production division. He was promoted to lieutenant colonel on 1 February 1942 and colonel on 1 March 1942.

On 1 June 1943, Irvine went to Washington, D.C., as the assistant for aircraft production to the Assistant Chief of Staff, Materiel. As such, he became involved in the Boeing B-29 Superfortress program. In March 1944, the Chief of the United States Army Air Forces, General Henry H. Arnold, became frustrated with delays in getting the B-29s ready for service in Operation Matterhorn, the deployment to China. He designated Brigadier General Bennett E. Meyers, who was traveling with him, as special project coordinator, and Meyers Irvine as his deputy. Boeing provided 600 workers to assist in what became known as the Battle of Kansas. The deficiencies of each aircraft were cataloged and spare parts obtained. Work was carried out in appalling Kansas winter conditions, with snowstorms and outdoor temperatures between −2 and 20 °F (−19 and −7 °C). By 15 April 150 aircraft were combat ready.

On returning to Washington, D.C., on 9 September 1944, he became the assistant chief of staff, A-4, of the Twentieth Air Force, the command responsible for the B-29s. In this role he oversaw the logistical support. He conducted tests of the B-29 under combat conditions in England and North Africa, and was involved in Silverplate, which readied B-29 to carry nuclear weapons. He went to the Pacific as the deputy chief of staff for supply and maintenance of the XXI Bomber Command, and participated in bombing raids on Nagoya. He was awarded the Army Distinguished Service Medal and the Silver Star.

== Post-war ==
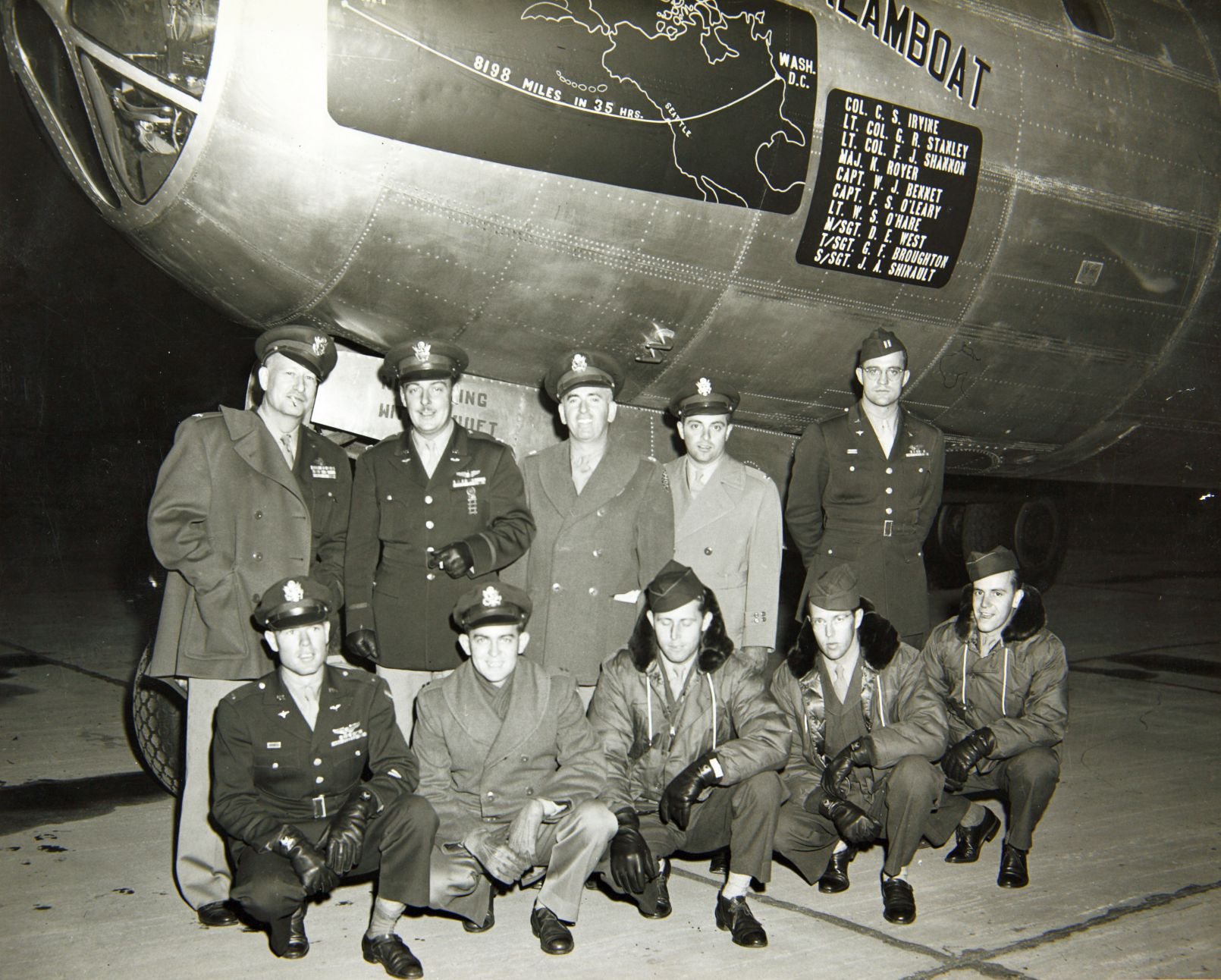
Irvine (top left) and the crew of the Pacusan Dreamboat

Irvine remained in the Pacific after the war as the Twentieth Air Force's deputy chief of staff for supply and maintenance from 9 August to 13 October 1945, then as the assistant chief of staff, A-4, of the United States Strategic Air Forces in the Pacific until 6 December 1945, as deputy chief of staff of the Pacific Air Command, United States Army (PACUSA) from 7 December 1945 to 31 December 1946, and of the Far East Air Forces as PACUSA was became on 1 January 1947 when the United States Air Force was formed. He developed cruise control techniques to extended the range of the bombers, and he set a new record from Los Angeles to New York of 5 hours, 27 minutes. In October 1946, he piloted the B-29 Pacusan Dreamboat from Honolulu in an unrefueled non-stop flight to Cairo in 39 hours and 36 minutes, for which he was awarded the Distinguished Flying Cross.

Returning to the United States in March 1947, Irvine became the assistant chief of staff of the Strategic Air Command at Andrews Air Force Base in Maryland from 10 April 1947 to 5 September 1948. He commanded the Silverplate B-29s of the 509th Bomb Wing at Walker Air Force Base in New Mexico from 15 September 1948 to 2 January 1950, with the rank of brigadier general from 10 September 1949. He then commanded the 7th Bomb Wing at Carswell Air Force Base in Texas from 3 January 1950 to 15 February 1951, and then the 19th Air Division there until October 1951. In this role he was concerned with the development and deployment of the Convair B-36A Peacemaker bomber. He was promoted to major general on 11 April 1951.

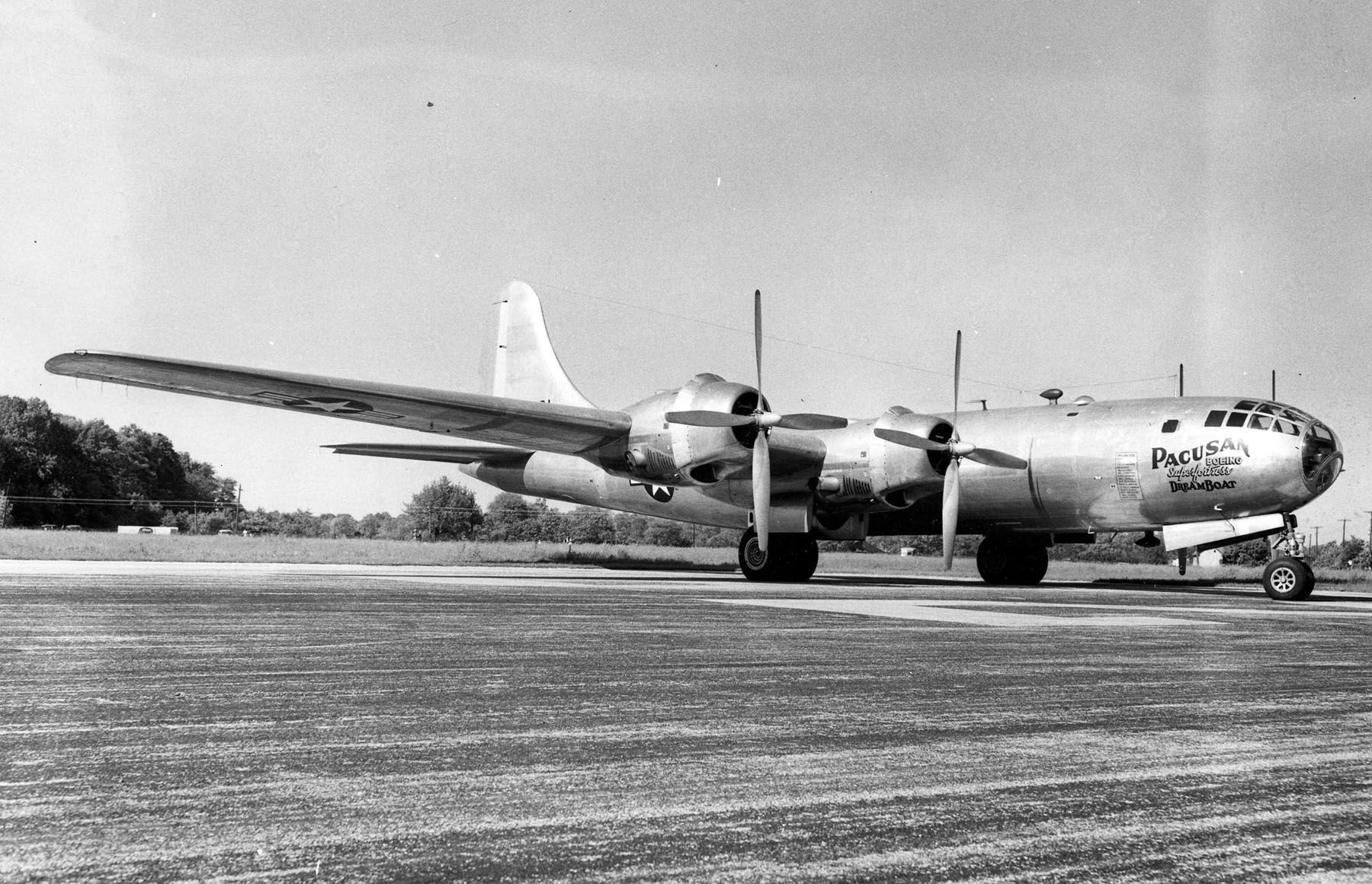
B-29B-60-BA Superfortress Pacusan Dreamboat (44–84061). Colonel Irvine and his crew made an unrefueled non-stop 9,500-mile flight from Honolulu to Cairo over the Arctic in 39 hours, 36 minutes.

Irvine returned to what was now Wright-Patterson Air Force Base on 29 October 1951, during the Korean War, as the deputy commander of the Air Materiel Command for production and weapons systems. In this role he was responsible for the new generation of jet fighters and bombers. He was part of nearly every major Air Force production program, but was particularly involved with the development of the Boeing B-47 Stratojet and Boeing B-52 Stratofortress bombers. He then became the deputy chief of staff, material, at U.S. Air Force headquarters from 28 April 1955 to 30 April 1959, with the rank of lieutenant general.

Irvine's decorations included the Army Distinguished Service Medal, the Legion of Merit with oak leaf cluster, the Silver Star, the Distinguished Flying Cross with oak leaf cluster, the Air Medal with oak leaf cluster, the Bronze Star Medal, American Defense Service Medal, European–African–Middle Eastern Campaign Medal, Army Commendation Medal and the Asiatic Pacific Campaign Medal.

After retiring from the U.S. Air Force, Irvine worked for Avco, and then for Rockwell International, where he was involved with the design and development of the Rockwell B-1 Lancer bomber.

== Private life ==
Irvine married Marie White Kelso in 1925. She had one son, Robert Kelso, whom he adopted. They were divorced on 24 October 1942. He married Ruth Salman in on 16 December 1947. They had two children: Jane and James. Ruth died on 29 December 1973, and on 4 May 1974 he married his third wife, Carol Pierpont Jones.

Irvine died on 7 September 1975 and was buried in Arlington National Cemetery.

== Dates of rank ==
| Insignia | Rank | Component | Date | Reference |
|---|---|---|---|---|
| | Second Lieutenant | United States Army Air Service Reserve | 15 October 1921 | |
| | First Lieutenant | United States Army Air Service Reserve | 6 July 1925 | |
| | Second Lieutenant | United States Army Air Corps | 30 June 1926 | |
| | First Lieutenant | United States Army Air Corps | 1 August 1932 | |
| | Captain | United States Army Air Corps | 30 June 1936 | |
| | Major (temporary) | United States Army Air Corps | 30 June 1940 | |
| | Lieutenant Colonel (temporary) | United States Army Air Corps | 5 January 1942 | |
| | Lieutenant Colonel | Army of the United States | 1 February 1942 | |
| | Colonel | Army of the United States | 1 March 1942 | |
| | Major (substantive) | United States Army Air Corps | 30 June 1943 | |
| | Colonel | United States Air Force | 2 April 1948 | |
| | Brigadier General (temporary) | United States Air Force | 10 September 1949 | |
| | Brigadier General | United States Air Force | 27 January 1950 | |
| | Major General (temporary) | United States Air Force | 11 April 1951 | |
| | Major General | United States Air Force | 9 October 1951 | |
| | Lieutenant General | United States Air Force | 10 May 1955 | |
