= Nysted, Nebraska =

Unincorporated community in Nebraska, United States

- Unincorporated Community
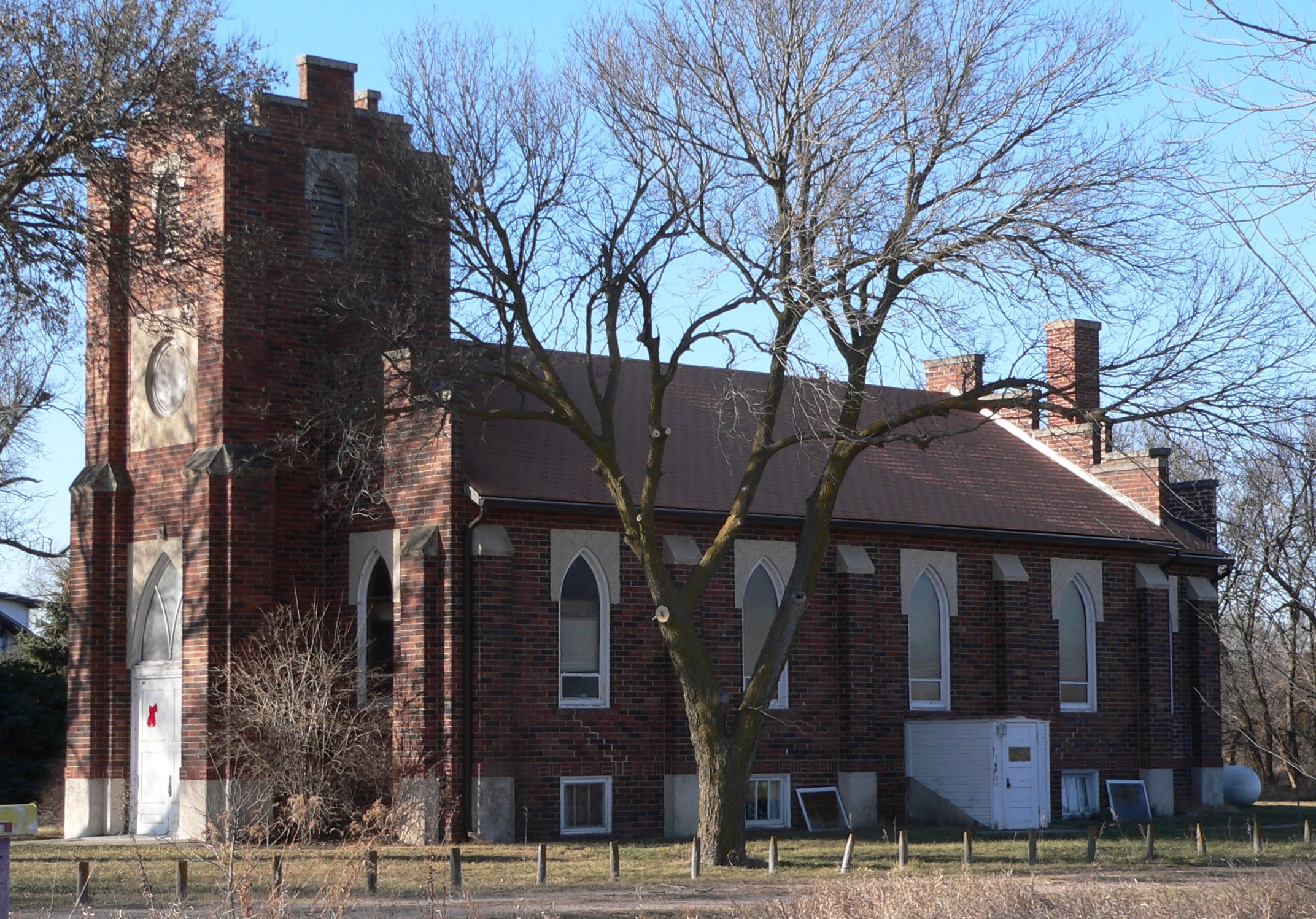
- St. Peder's Dansk Evangelical Lutheran Kirke

- Location within Nebraska Location within the United States
- Coordinates: 41.1°N 98.6°W
- Country: United States
- State: Nebraska
- County: Howard

Nysted is an unincorporated community in Howard County, Nebraska, United States.

== History ==
Nysted was founded in 1883. A majority of the early settlers being natives of Denmark caused the name Nysted to be selected.

A post office was established at Nysted in 1883, and remained in operation until it was discontinued in 1918.
