= St. Peder's Dansk Evangelical Lutheran Kirke =

Historic church in Nebraska, United States

- U.S. National Register of Historic Places
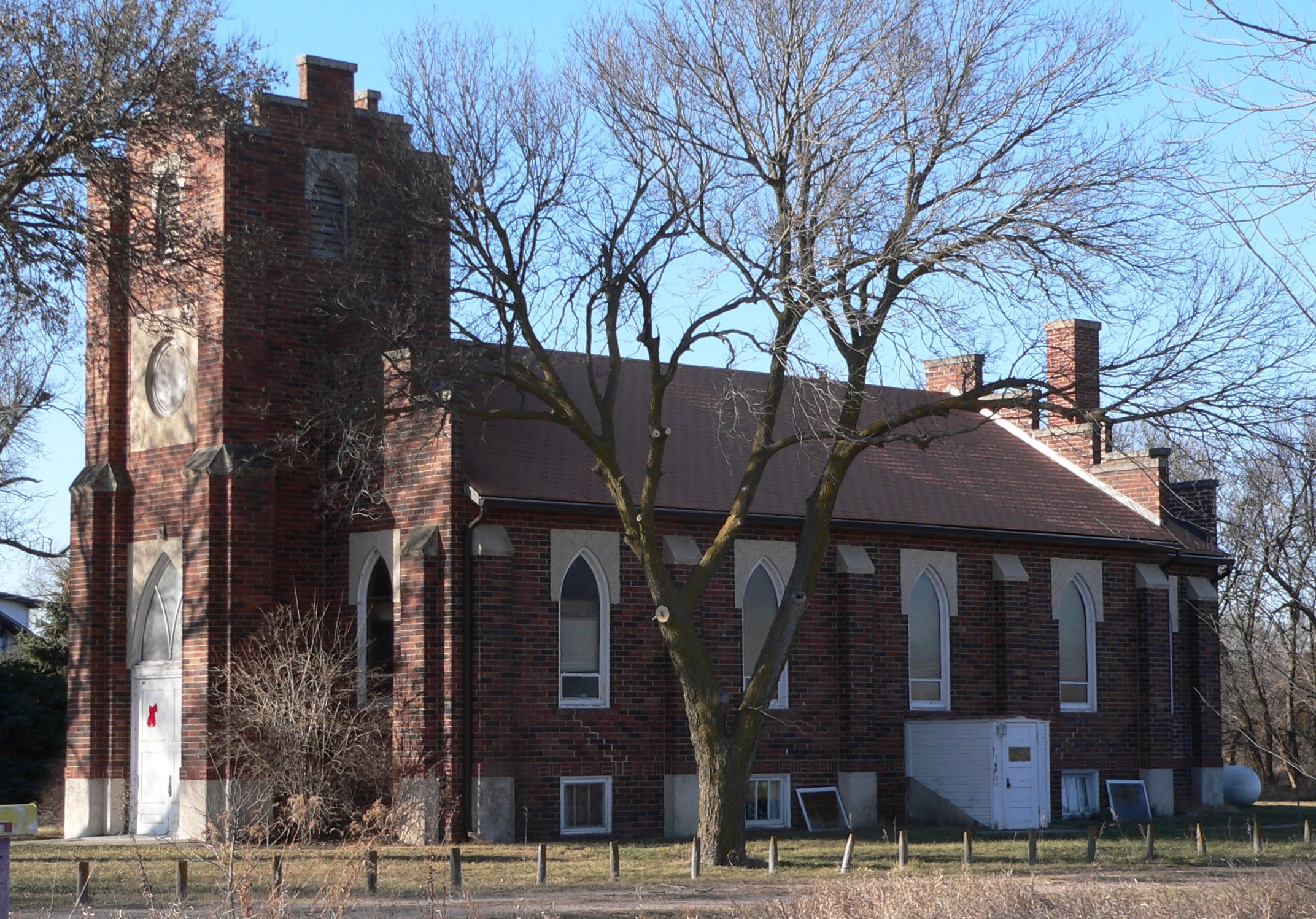
- From southeast, in 2009

- Location within Nebraska Location within the United States
- Location: 1796 7th Ave., Nysted, Nebraska
- Coordinates: 41°8′5″N 98°36′48″W
- Area: less than one acre
- Built: 1919
- Built by: John Ohlsen, William H. Ohlsen
- NRHP reference No.: 07000177
- Added to NRHP: March 21, 2007

St. Peder's Dansk Evangelical Lutheran Kirke (also known as St. Peder's Evangelical Lutheran Church) is a historic church at 1796 7th Avenue in Nysted, Nebraska. It was built in 1919 and was added to the National Register of Historic Places in 2007.

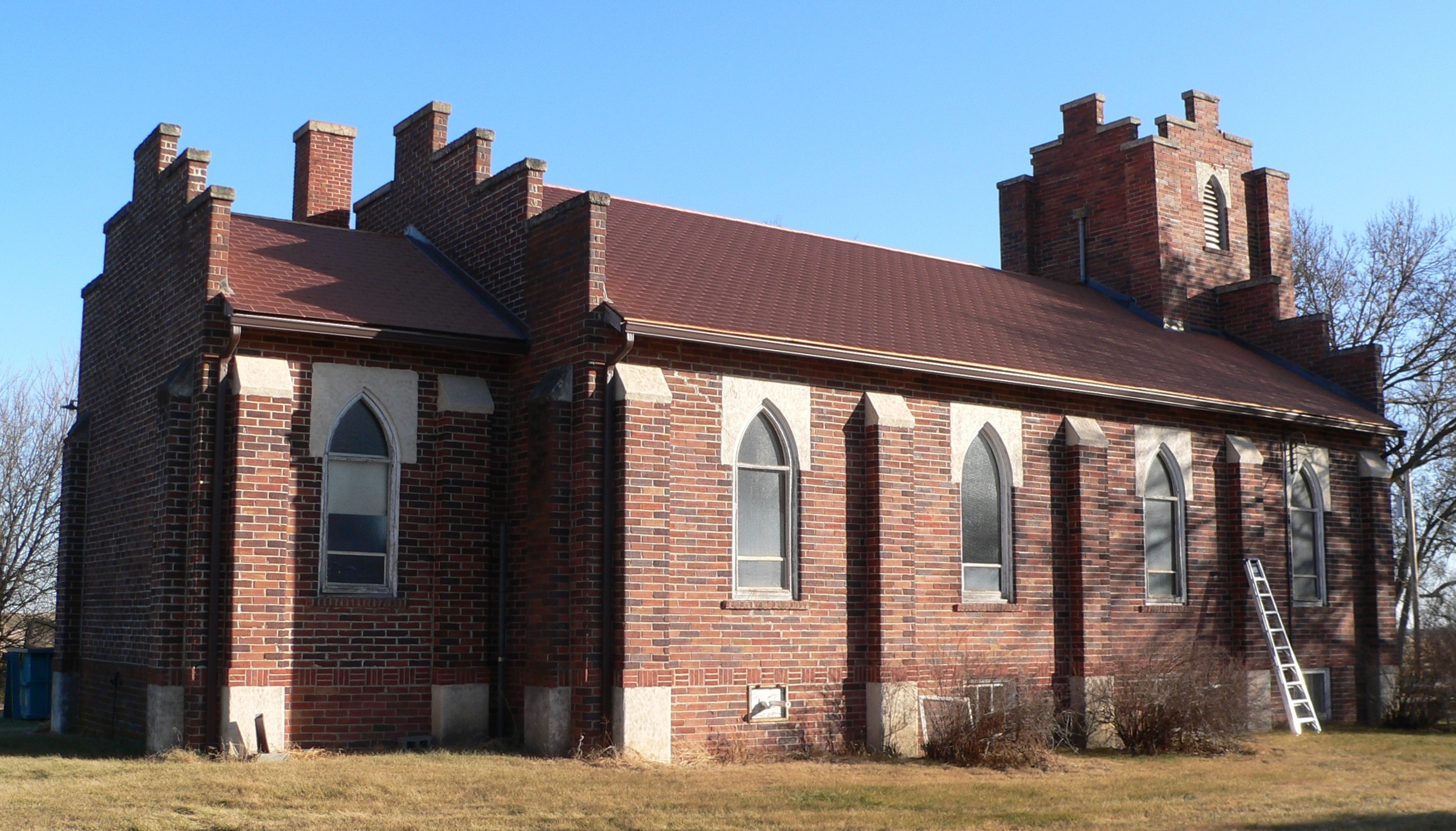
From west, in 2009

The church is located in Nysted, a town whose population peaked at 65 in 1890, and was named by Danish immigrants for Nysted ("New Place"), Denmark. The church used Danish as its primary language until 1938. It was deemed significant for "its role in maintaining and promulgating the heritage of the region's Danish immigrants and their children....Through its role in the Danish Folk School, it promoted education and the quest for enlightenment amongst Danish-Americans from the area, but also for those of Danish descent for several states around Nebraska. It sought to encourage them to foster education throughout a lifetime, be both good Americans and good Danes."

It was also deemed significant for its architecture: The building, with its stepped gables, is reminiscent of the Danish village churches the immigrants would have attended before they emigrated, and is what they would have looked back upon for inspiration for a building to suit their spiritual needs. The building has excellent historic integrity and remains an important place to the descendants of the builders to this day."

It is a rectangular, one-story brick church with a composite shingled gable roof, built upon a concrete foundation. It has a central entrance under a square bell tower. A gothic window is "above the front doors, along with a 'blind roundel'. The front facade contains engaged buttresses with concrete caps on either side of the door, which provide structural support to the tower. The bell tower also contains gothic shaped vents with concrete caps. The inscription on the bell when translated reads "Yours was not the busy city's pounding, you were cast for my own village small." The front doors are original. Each side of the church contains four gothic arched windows with concrete caps, and all are found between engaged buttresses that also feature concrete caps."

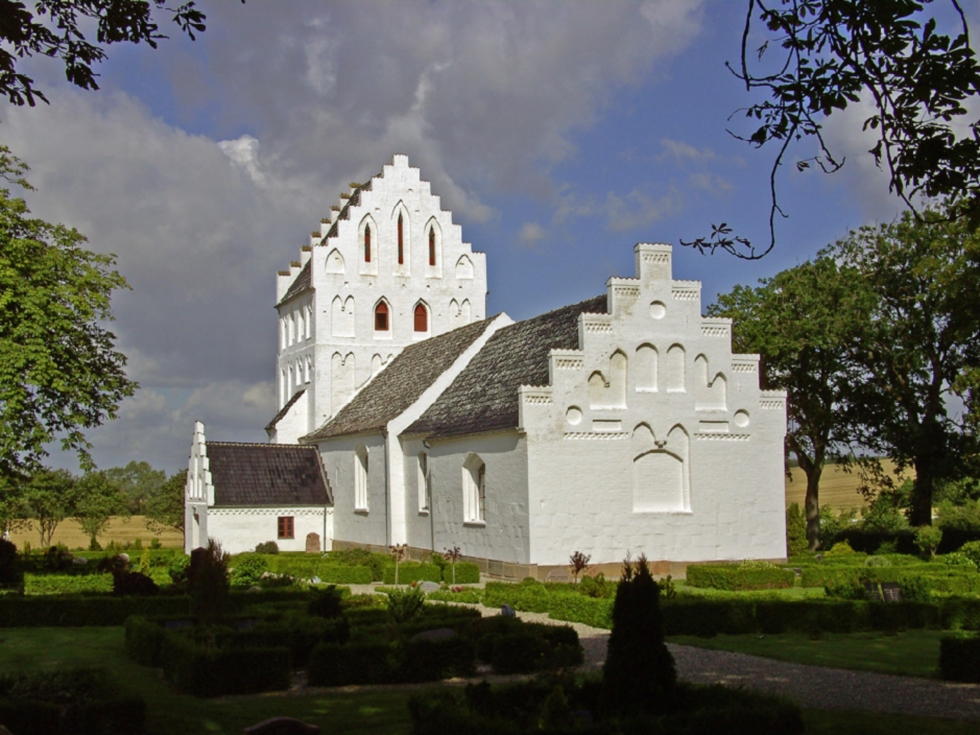
Asperup Kirke, Asperup, Denmark

Further, the nomination states:

According to America's Architectural Roots: Ethnic Groups that Built America, most Danish Lutheran Churches for which Danish-American communities are known are designed in a variant of the High Victorian Gothic style. St. Peder's Church is one of few in the United States which displays the square entrance tower and stepped gables of the Dutch style prominent in the 15th and 16th century Danish ecclesiastical architecture. The design is indicative of the traditional village churches of their homeland, with numerous stepped gables and prominent towers. Incised decorations such as the blind roundel, while not elaborate on this example, are reminiscent of the blind colonnades of the original examples in Denmark. The stylistic details of St. Peder's are particularly similar to the churches in Asperup and Landet in Denmark [photos included].

It may also have been known as St. Peder's Evangelical Lutheran Church.
