= Cushing, Nebraska =

- Village
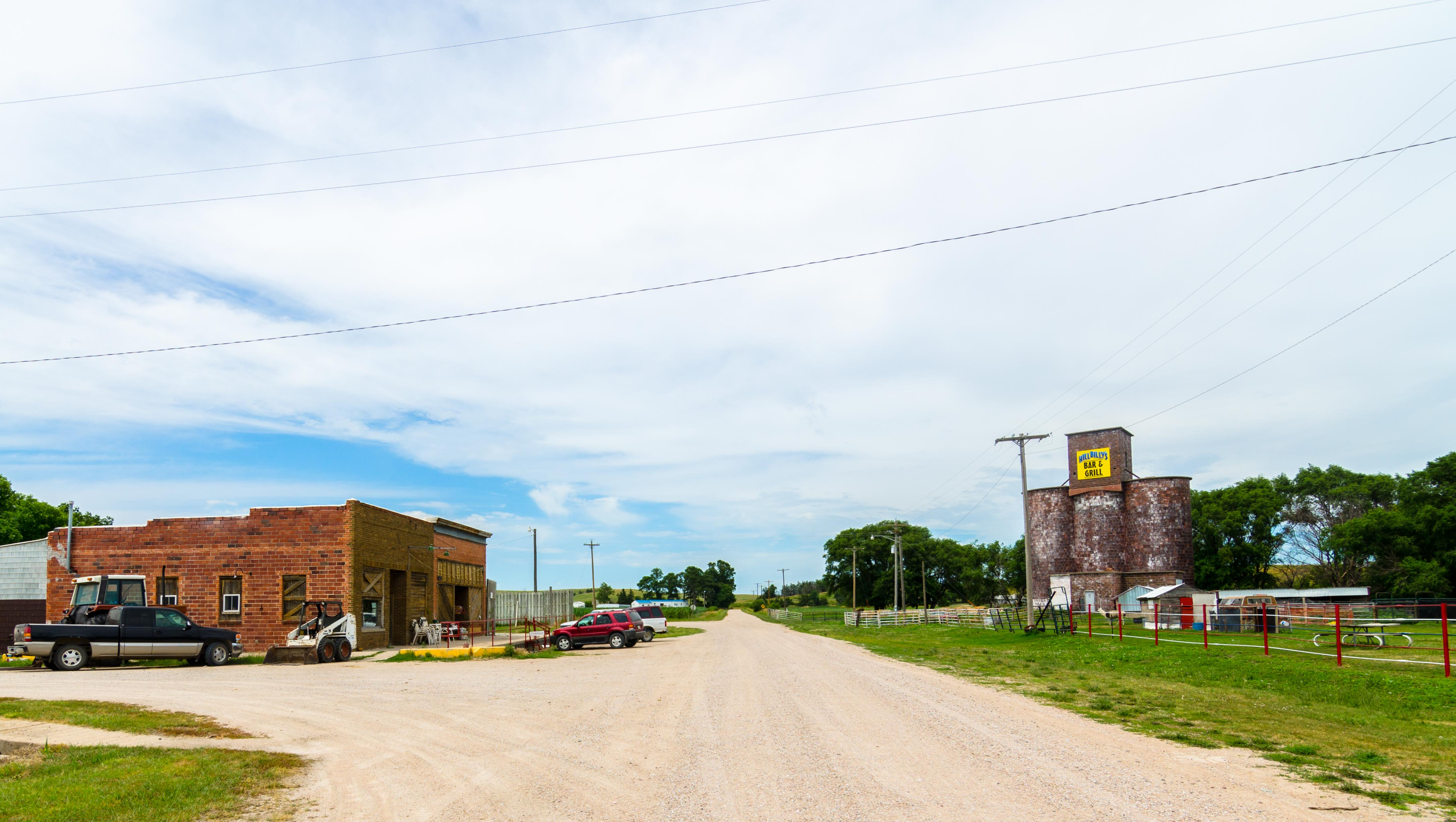

- Location of Cushing, Nebraska
- Coordinates: 41°17′41″N 98°22′09″W
- Country: United States
- State: Nebraska
- County: Howard

Area
  - Total: 0.31 sq mi (0.80 km^{2})
  - Land: 0.31 sq mi (0.80 km^{2})
  - Water: 0 sq mi (0.00 km^{2})
- Elevation: 1,791 ft (546 m)

Population (2020)
  - Total: 37
  - Density: 120.3/sq mi (46.43/km^{2})
- Time zone: UTC-6 (Central (CST))
  - Summer (DST): UTC-5 (CDT)
- ZIP code: 68873
- Area code: 308
- FIPS code: 31-11860
- GNIS feature ID: 2398661

Cushing is a village in Howard County, Nebraska, United States. As of the 2020 census, Cushing had a population of 37. It is part of the Grand Island, Nebraska Micropolitan Statistical Area.

== History ==
Cushing was established in 1887 when the Chicago, Burlington & Quincy Railroad was extended to that point. The community has the name of James Cushing, a pioneer citizen.

== Geography ==
According to the United States Census Bureau, the village has a total area of 0.31 square miles (0.80 km^{2}), all land.

== Demographics ==
Historical population
Census	Pop.	Note	%±
1930	141		—
1940	102		−27.7%
1950	71		−30.4%
1960	56		−21.1%
1970	43		−23.2%
1980	48		11.6%
1990	25		−47.9%
2000	31		24.0%
2010	32		3.2%
2020	37		15.6%
U.S. Decennial Census

=== 2010 census ===
As of the census of 2010, there were 32 people, 14 households, and 10 families residing in the village. The population density was 103.2 inhabitants per square mile (39.8/km^{2}). There were 15 housing units at an average density of 48.4 per square mile (18.7/km^{2}). The racial makeup of the village was 96.9% White and 3.1% from other races. Hispanic or Latino of any race were 3.1% of the population.

There were 14 households, of which 35.7% had children under the age of 18 living with them, 50.0% were married couples living together, 14.3% had a female householder with no husband present, 7.1% had a male householder with no wife present, and 28.6% were non-families. 28.6% of all households were made up of individuals, and 7.1% had someone living alone who was 65 years of age or older. The average household size was 2.29 and the average family size was 2.80.

The median age in the village was 39.5 years. 25% of residents were under the age of 18; 9.5% were between the ages of 18 and 24; 25% were from 25 to 44; 28.2% were from 45 to 64; and 12.5% were 65 years of age or older. The gender makeup of the village was 53.1% male and 46.9% female.

=== 2000 census ===
As of the census of 2000, there were 31 people, 13 households, and 8 families residing in the village. The population density was 102.8 inhabitants per square mile (39.7/km^{2}). There were 14 housing units at an average density of 46.4 per square mile (17.9/km^{2}). The racial makeup of the village was 100.00% White.

There were 13 households, out of which 38.5% had children under the age of 18 living with them, 53.8% were married couples living together, 15.4% had a female householder with no husband present, and 30.8% were non-families. 30.8% of all households were made up of individuals, and 15.4% had someone living alone who was 65 years of age or older. The average household size was 2.38 and the average family size was 3.00.

In the village, the population was spread out, with 25.8% under the age of 18, 6.5% from 18 to 24, 35.5% from 25 to 44, 25.8% from 45 to 64, and 6.5% who were 65 years of age or older. The median age was 38 years. For every 100 females, there were 93.8 males. For every 100 females age 18 and over, there were 109.1 males.

As of 2000 the median income for a household in the village was $20,625, and the median income for a family was $17,500. Males had a median income of $24,375 versus $12,917 for females. The per capita income for the village was $9,161. There were 50.0% of families and 60.5% of the population living below the poverty line, including 83.3% of under eighteens and none of those over 64.
