= Cotesfield, Nebraska =

- Village
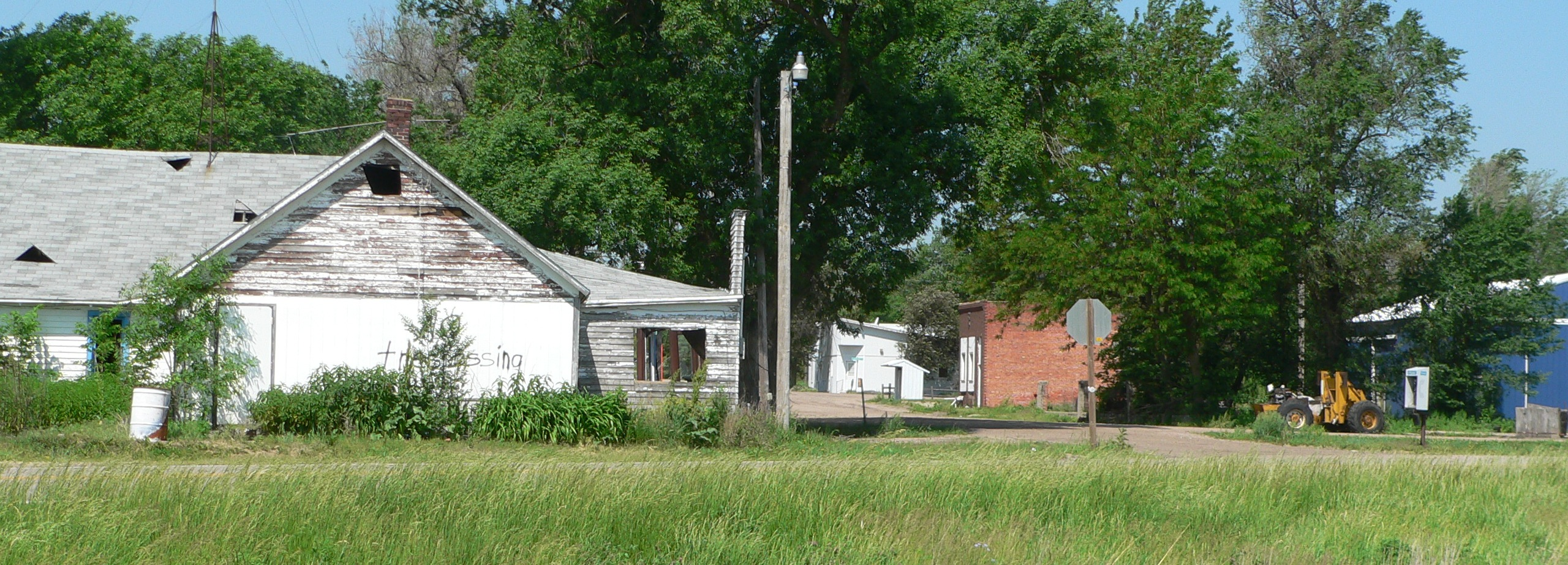
- Cotesfield, seen from east of Nebraska Highway 11

- Location of Cotesfield, Nebraska
- Coordinates: 41°21′27″N 98°38′01″W
- Country: United States
- State: Nebraska
- County: Howard

Area
  - Total: 0.53 sq mi (1.36 km^{2})
  - Land: 0.53 sq mi (1.36 km^{2})
  - Water: 0 sq mi (0.00 km^{2})
- Elevation: 1,900 ft (580 m)

Population (2020)
  - Total: 29
  - Density: 55.3/sq mi (21.37/km^{2})
- Time zone: UTC-6 (Central (CST))
  - Summer (DST): UTC-5 (CDT)
- ZIP code: 68835
- Area code: 308
- FIPS code: 31-10740
- GNIS feature ID: 2398634

Cotesfield is a village in Howard County, Nebraska, United States. As of the 2020 census, Cotesfield had a population of 29. It is part of the Grand Island, Nebraska Micropolitan Statistical Area.

== History ==
Although the area was first settled in the 1870s, the town site at Cotesfield was not built up until 1902. It was named for Miss Coates, the travel companion of the daughter of Christopher C. Augur, a Department of the Platte official.

A post office was established at Cotesfield in 1871, and remained in operation until it was discontinued in 1996.

== Geography ==
According to the United States Census Bureau, the village has a total area of 0.52 square miles (1.35 km^{2}), all land.

== Demographics ==
Historical population
Census	Pop.	Note	%±
1920	214		—
1930	153		−28.5%
1940	134		−12.4%
1950	106		−20.9%
1960	81		−23.6%
1970	76		−6.2%
1980	82		7.9%
1990	60		−26.8%
2000	66		10.0%
2010	46		−30.3%
2020	29		−37.0%
U.S. Decennial Census; 2012 Estimate

=== 2010 census ===
As of the census of 2010, there were 46 people, 19 households, and 11 families residing in the village. The population density was 88.5 inhabitants per square mile (34.2/km^{2}). There were 28 housing units at an average density of 53.8 per square mile (20.8/km^{2}). The racial makeup of the village was 93.5% White, 2.2% Native American, and 4.3% from two or more races.

There were 19 households, of which 21.1% had children under the age of 18 living with them, 47.4% were married couples living together, 5.3% had a female householder with no husband present, 5.3% had a male householder with no wife present, and 42.1% were non-families. 31.6% of all households were made up of individuals, and 5.3% had someone living alone who was 65 years of age or older. The average household size was 2.42 and the average family size was 3.18.

The median age in the village was 46.5 years. 23.9% of residents were under the age of 18; 13% were between the ages of 18 and 24; 6.6% were from 25 to 44; 36.9% were from 45 to 64; and 19.6% were 65 years of age or older. The gender makeup of the village was 56.5% male and 43.5% female.

=== 2000 census ===
As of the census of 2000, there were 66 people, 26 households, and 19 families residing in the village. The population density was 124.7 inhabitants per square mile (48.1/km^{2}). There were 30 housing units at an average density of 56.7 per square mile (21.9/km^{2}). The racial makeup of the village was 98.48% White, and 1.52% from two or more races.

There were 26 households, out of which 26.9% had children under the age of 18 living with them, 57.7% were married couples living together, 7.7% had a female householder with no husband present, and 23.1% were non-families. 23.1% of all households were made up of individuals, and 11.5% had someone living alone who was 65 years of age or older. The average household size was 2.54 and the average family size was 2.80.

In the village, the population was spread out, with 24.2% under the age of 18, 7.6% from 18 to 24, 21.2% from 25 to 44, 28.8% from 45 to 64, and 18.2% who were 65 years of age or older. The median age was 42 years. For every 100 females, there were 120.0 males. For every 100 females age 18 and over, there were 100.0 males.

As of 2000 the median income for a household in the village was $14,583, and the median income for a family was $19,375. Males had a median income of $23,125 versus $26,875 for females. The per capita income for the village was $10,727. There were 30.4% of families and 34.8% of the population living below the poverty line, including 100.0% of under eighteens and 27.3% of those over 64.
