= Howard City, Nebraska =

- Village
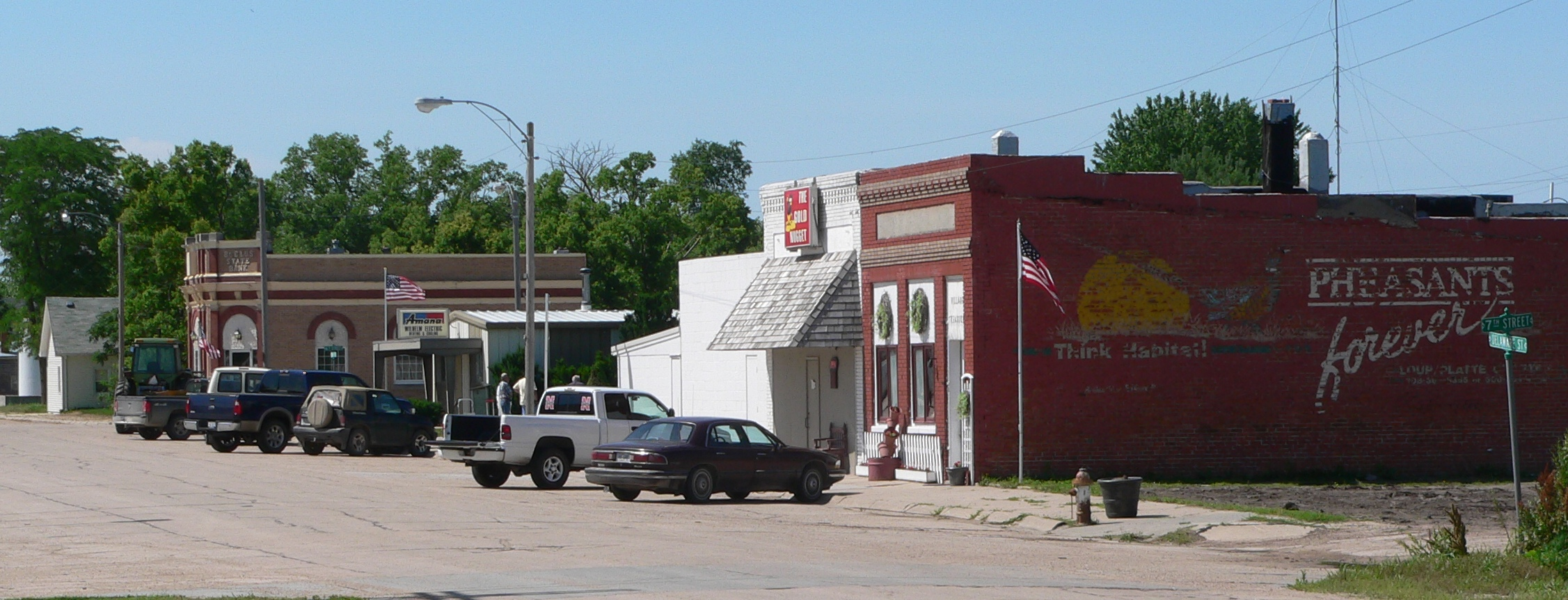
- Downtown Boelus: west side of Delaware Street

- Location within the state of Nebraska
- Coordinates: 41°04′31″N 98°42′56″W
- Country: United States
- State: Nebraska
- County: Howard

Area
  - Total: 0.71 sq mi (1.84 km^{2})
  - Land: 0.71 sq mi (1.84 km^{2})
  - Water: 0 sq mi (0.00 km^{2})
- Elevation: 1,919 ft (585 m)

Population (2020)
  - Total: 181
  - Density: 254.9/sq mi (98.43/km^{2})
- Time zone: UTC-6 (Central (CST))
  - Summer (DST): UTC-5 (CST)
- ZIP codes: 68820
- FIPS code: 31-23270
- GNIS feature ID: 2398548

Howard City, locally referred to as Boelus, is a village in Howard County, Nebraska, United States. As of the 2020 census, Howard City had a population of 181. It is part of the Grand Island, Nebraska Micropolitan Statistical Area.

== History ==
Boelus was originally called Howard City, and under the latter name was established in 1885 when it was certain that the railroad would be extended to that point.

The origin of the name Boelus is unclear. According to some sources, Boelus was likely named from the Belus River, while another source states Boelus got its name by conjoining the surnames Boesen and Larson, and the United States.

== Geography ==
According to the United States Census Bureau, the village has a total area of 0.71 square miles (1.84 km^{2}), all land.

== Demographics ==
Historical population
Census	Pop.	Note	%±
1890	150		—
1900	183		22.0%
1910	233		27.3%
1920	259		11.2%
1930	246		−5.0%
1940	228		−7.3%
1950	167		−26.8%
1960	181		8.4%
1970	182		0.6%
1980	228		25.3%
1990	203		−11.0%
2000	221		8.9%
2010	189		−14.5%
2020	181		−4.2%
U.S. Decennial Census

=== 2010 census ===
As of the census of 2010, there were 189 people, 90 households, and 54 families residing in the village. The population density was 266.2 inhabitants per square mile (102.8/km^{2}). There were 100 housing units at an average density of 140.8 per square mile (54.4/km^{2}). The racial makeup of the village was 97.4% White and 2.6% Native American. Hispanic or Latino people of any race were 5.3% of the population.

There were 90 households, of which 21.1% had children under the age of 18 living with them, 53.3% were married couples living together, 5.6% had a female householder with no husband present, 1.1% had a male householder with no wife present, and 40.0% were non-families. 37.8% of all households were made up of individuals, and 20% had someone living alone who was 65 years of age or older. The average household size was 2.10 and the average family size was 2.76.

The median age in the village was 48.8 years. 17.5% of residents were under the age of 18; 6.3% were between the ages of 18 and 24; 18.5% were from 25 to 44; 32.9% were from 45 to 64; and 24.9% were 65 years of age or older. The gender makeup of the village was 48.7% male and 51.3% female.

=== 2000 census ===
As of the census of 2000, there were 221 people, 92 households, and 58 families residing in the village. The population density was 312.1 inhabitants per square mile (120.5/km^{2}). There were 102 housing units at an average density of 144.1 per square mile (55.6/km^{2}). The racial makeup of the village was 98.19% White, 0.45% Pacific Islander, 0.45% from other races, and 0.90% from two or more races. Hispanic or Latino people of any race were 0.90% of the population.

There were 92 households, out of which 31.5% had children under the age of 18 living with them, 52.2% were married couples living together, 7.6% had a female householder with no husband present, and 35.9% were non-families. 34.8% of all households were made up of individuals, and 22.8% had someone living alone who was 65 years of age or older. The average household size was 2.40 and the average family size was 3.14.

In the village, the population was spread out, with 29.9% under the age of 18, 5.4% from 18 to 24, 24.4% from 25 to 44, 21.3% from 45 to 64, and 19.0% who were 65 years of age or older. The median age was 37 years. For every 100 females, there were 110.5 males. For every 100 females age 18 and over, there were 109.5 males.

The median income for a household in the village was $26,500, and the median income for a family was $28,750. Males had a median income of $24,792 versus $22,750 for females. The per capita income for the village was $11,797. About 12.1% of families and 20.2% of the population were below the poverty line, including 23.5% of those under the age of eighteen and 25.0% of those 65 or over.

== Boesen School ==
The Boesen School, also known as District 28, was a one-room schoolhouse. The school operated from the fall of 1877 through the spring of 1953. The school was located a mile from the Boesen homestead.

== Notable person ==
- Lowen Kruse, Nebraska legislator
