= Bennett Meyers =

United States Air Force general (1895–1979)

Bennett E. Meyers
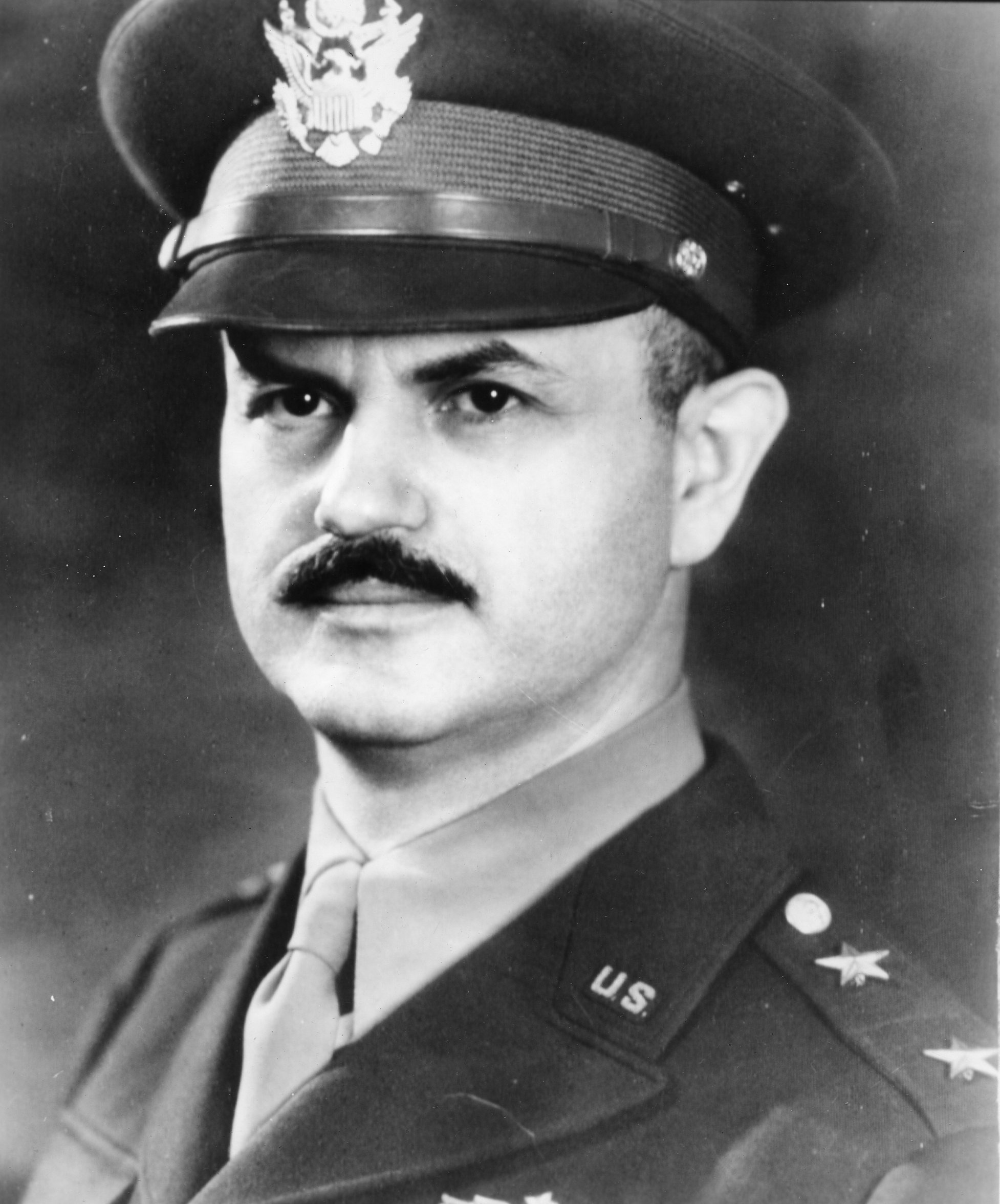
- Born: 29 March 1895; Buffalo, New York, U.S.
- Died: 25 February 1979 (aged 81)
- Military career
- Allegiance: United States
- Branch: United States Army (1917–1947); United States Air Force (1947–1948)
- Service years: 1917–1948
- Rank: Major general
- Service number: O-11293
- Conflicts: World War I; World War II
- Awards: Legion of Merit; Army Distinguished Service Medal

Bennett Edward Meyers (29 March 1895 – 25 February 1979) was a United States Air Force (USAF) major general who commanded the Air Materiel Command and the Air Technical Service Command during World War II. He was dismissed from the service on 16 July 1948 after being convicted of perjury.

== Biography ==
Bennett Edward Meyers was born in Buffalo, New York, on 29 March 1895. In World War I he enlisted in the Aviation Section, U.S. Signal Corps Reserve on 2 February 1918 as a flying cadet. He completed ground school at Berkeley, California, and flying school at Rockwell Field, California, and was commissioned as a temporary second lieutenant in the United States Army Air Service on 22 June 1918. On 1 July 1920, he accepted a Regular Army commission as a second lieutenant in the Air Service.

Meyers became the commanding officer of the Surplus Property District in Detroit, Michigan, in November 1920. When this work was completed in September 1921, he moved to Buffalo, New York, where he undertook a similar assignment and became commanding officer of the Air Reserve Depot there. In September 1923, he went to the Territory of Hawaii, initially as a military intelligence officer at Luke Field, before joining the 23rd Bombardment Squadron there in July 1924.

In June 1927 Meyers was transferred to Wright Field, Ohio, where he worked in procurement. He attended the special observation course at the advanced flying school, Kelly Field, Texas, from November 1927 until February 1928, after which he returned to Wright Field, where he become the chief of the Plans Division of the Industrial War Plans Section there. He became a student officer at the Army Industrial College in Washington, D.C., in September 1929. He returned to Wright Field after graduation in June 1930, but was detailed to the Babson Institute in Wellesley, Massachusetts, in September 1931. He graduated in June 1932 with high distinction and was class valedictorian. He remained there performing post graduate work until June 1933 when he again returned to Wright Field, this time as executive to the Field Service Section. In 1935 he established the Budget Office there and became its chief.

During World War II, Meyers was transferred to Washington, D.C., in September 1940 as an assistant executive in the Office of the Chief of the United States Army Air Corps. He became executive officer of the Materiel Command there in November 1940, and then deputy to the Assistant Chief of Air Staff of the United States Army Air Forces (USAAF) when that organization was formed in March 1942, soon after the United States joined the conflict. He became the commander of the Air Materiel Command, with his headquarters at Wright Field, in June 1944, and the following month became the Deputy Director, Army Air Forces Materiel and Services at Patterson Field, Ohio. In May 1945 he assumed command of the Air Technical Service Command. He retired in 1945 with the rank of major general. For his services, he was awarded the Legion of Merit and the Army Distinguished Service Medal.

As the second in command for procurement in the USAAF, he had overseen $60 billion in government contracts (equivalent to $830 billion in 2025). Meyers had acquired a Dayton, Ohio, company called Aviation Electric, in a 190-by-140-foot (58 by 43 m), one-story building with thirty machines, at its peak. He put about $54,000 (equivalent to $1,241,000 in 2025) into it, and installed Bleriot H. Lamarre, the husband of his secretary, Mildred Readnower, as the president of the company, for which he initially paid Lamarre $38 a week (equivalent to $873 in 2025), which was later raised to $51.51. Her brother Thomas Readnower became the vice president at $18,600 a year, but was actually paid $25 a week. Lamarre's salary was $31,000 a year. During the war he became involved with Ila Rhodes, an actress, and her father, Ray Curnutt, a former bus driver, was paid $12,000 a year as the company's production manager. Meyers entered into a contract with Bell Aircraft to provide fuse boxes. Lamarre estimated that they could be made for $11 apiece, so Meyers asked for and got a contract to supply them for $44.58 each. Over the next five years, Aviation Electric earned $1,053,000 from Bell (equivalent to $19,259,000 in 2025) and about $375,000 from other companies (equivalent to $6,858,000 in 2025).

Lamarre testified that Meyers had ordered him to lie to a Senate committee investigating the company. Meyers had taken $150,000 out of the company, which had profited from USAAF contracts. Under oath before the committee on 17 November 1947, Meyers testified that Lamarre's wife Mildred had also been his mistress for eight years. She filed a slander suit against him. In March 1948, Meyers was convicted on three counts of perjury and sentenced to twenty months to five years in prison. The conviction was upheld on appeal in June 1948. Bleriot Lamarre received two years' probation. Meyers was court martialed. His military decorations were revoked on 24 November 1947, and he was dismissed from the service of the United States by President Harry S. Truman on 16 July 1948.

Meyers died on 25 February 1979.
