= St. Paul, Nebraska =

- City
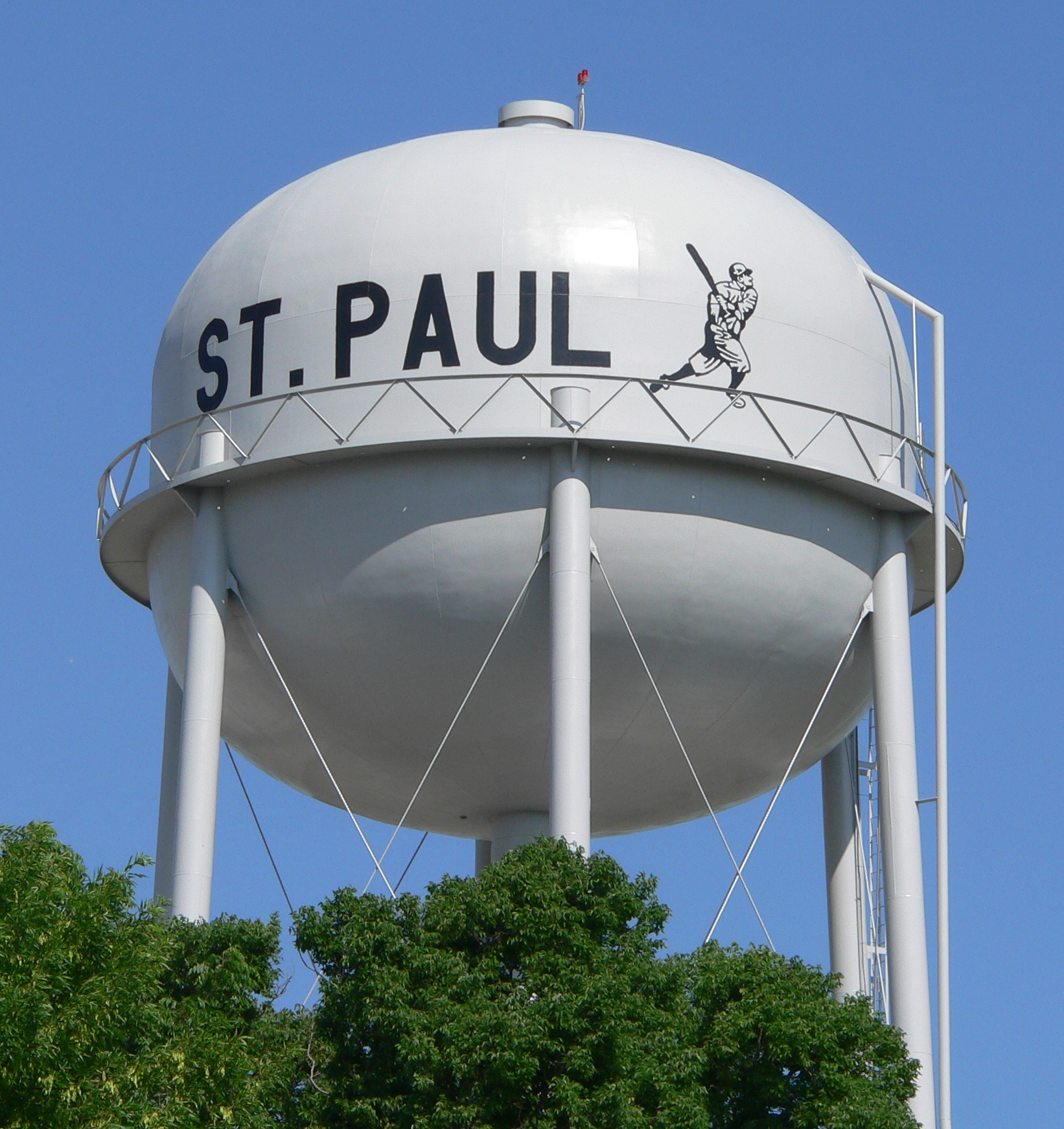
- St. Paul water tower, with image of baseball player Grover Cleveland Alexander

- Location of St. Paul, Nebraska
- Coordinates: 41°12′49″N 98°27′34″W
- Country: United States
- State: Nebraska
- County: Howard

Area
  - Total: 1.24 sq mi (3.22 km^{2})
  - Land: 1.24 sq mi (3.22 km^{2})
  - Water: 0 sq mi (0.00 km^{2})
- Elevation: 1,811 ft (552 m)

Population (2020)
  - Total: 2,416
  - Density: 1,945.0/sq mi (750.98/km^{2})
- Time zone: UTC-6 (Central (CST))
  - Summer (DST): UTC-5 (CDT)
- Zip Code: 68873
- FIPS code: 31-43265
- GNIS feature ID: 2396515
- Website: http://www.stpaulnebraska.com/

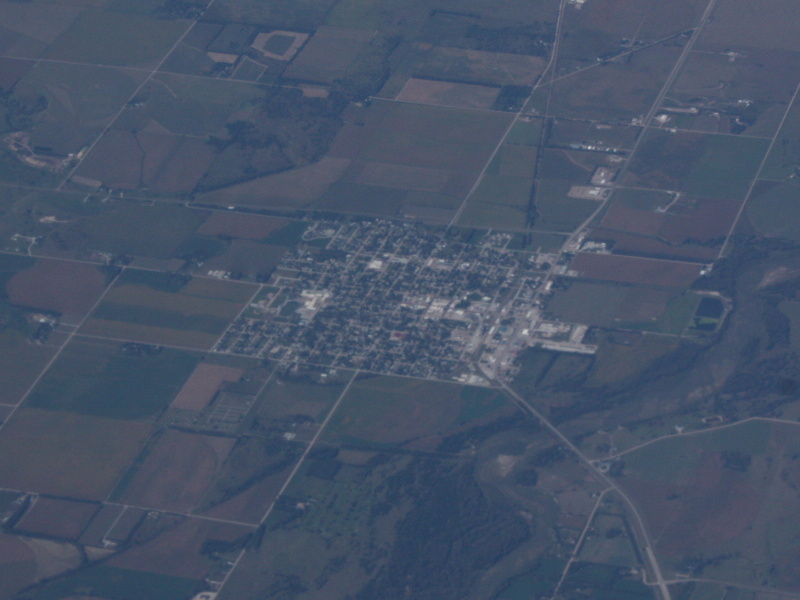
Oblique air photo from September, 2018

St. Paul or Saint Paul is a city in and the county seat of Howard County, Nebraska, United States. As of the 2020 census, St. Paul had a population of 2,416.

St. Paul is part of the Grand Island, Nebraska Micropolitan Statistical Area.

== History ==
St. Paul was founded by two young surveyors, James N. and Nicholas J. Paul, who had been surveying in Nebraska and the surrounding areas as the land opened to settlers. Struck by the beauty and the prospects of the Loup valley, they took out homesteads, successfully petitioned the state legislature to form a new county to be known as Howard County, and laid out the townsite. They brought the first settlers to the county in March 1871 and established the seat of government in St. Paul. Stillman Hazeltine put up the first building for a general store and town hall in the summer of 1871. That first building burned a few years later and the brick building which replaced it is still in use with his name and date 1871 on the front.

When the town was to be named, a committee collected the suggested names in a hat and the name Athens was drawn. Since an Athens already existed in the state, Nebraska Senator Phineas W. Hitchcock suggested the name St. Paul in honor of the Paul brothers who founded it. It officially became the county seat by vote in 1874 and was incorporated in 1881. The first mayor was E.F. Clapp.

During its first twenty years, Howard County was a typical western frontier with covered wagons, cowboys, huge cattle herds, rowdy railroad construction gangs, and Army detachments stationed within its borders. As settlers and the railroad extended north and west, the town of St. Paul served as an important trade center and quickly grew to a population of 2,000 residents. From 1882 until 1917, St. Paul was the home of Frank Iams, the nation's largest importer of European draft horses. Three-star General C.S. Irvine set record-shattering, long-distance flights in a B-29 shortly after World War II. Herbert Paul was Adjutant General of the Nebraska National Guard for 19 years.

St. Paul had a broom factory, canning factory, brick factory, cigar factory, two flour mills, hatchery and more. Through the years innovation like the first self-rising flour was developed at one of the flour mills. The first chicken hatchery in Nebraska started in Cushing in 1901, moved to St. Paul in 1922, and operated until 1956. Pirus, a cure for many kidney and liver ailments, was invented in St. Paul. Dorothy Lynch invented her famous salad dressing in St. Paul, which is now sold nationally.

Grover Cleveland Alexander, who was inducted into the National Baseball Hall of Fame, was born on a farm in the area and retired to St. Paul at the end of his sports career. The American Legion baseball field was dedicated on June 15, 1971, and named after Alexander. Each year St. Paul honors Alexander with the celebration of Grover Cleveland Alexander (GCA) Days, the weekend following the 4th of July.

== Geography ==
According to the United States Census Bureau, the city has a total area of 1.11 square miles (2.87 km^{2}), all land.

=== Climate ===
Climate data for St. Paul, Nebraska (1991–2020 normals, extremes 1899–2009)
| Month | Jan | Feb | Mar | Apr | May | Jun | Jul | Aug | Sep | Oct | Nov | Dec | Year |
|---|---|---|---|---|---|---|---|---|---|---|---|---|---|
| Record high °F (°C) | 74 (23) | 79 (26) | 92 (33) | 98 (37) | 106 (41) | 110 (43) | 115 (46) | 111 (44) | 108 (42) | 97 (36) | 85 (29) | 81 (27) | 115 (46) |
| Mean maximum °F (°C) | 57.6 (14.2) | 63.1 (17.3) | 75.8 (24.3) | 85.2 (29.6) | 90.6 (32.6) | 97.0 (36.1) | 100.5 (38.1) | 99.1 (37.3) | 94.7 (34.8) | 86.1 (30.1) | 72.1 (22.3) | 60.3 (15.7) | 102.1 (38.9) |
| Mean daily maximum °F (°C) | 35.4 (1.9) | 40.9 (4.9) | 54.0 (12.2) | 64.9 (18.3) | 73.9 (23.3) | 84.3 (29.1) | 88.8 (31.6) | 86.6 (30.3) | 80.0 (26.7) | 66.5 (19.2) | 50.1 (10.1) | 38.0 (3.3) | 63.6 (17.6) |
| Daily mean °F (°C) | 24.9 (−3.9) | 29.4 (−1.4) | 41.1 (5.1) | 51.6 (10.9) | 61.9 (16.6) | 72.2 (22.3) | 76.9 (24.9) | 74.8 (23.8) | 66.8 (19.3) | 53.5 (11.9) | 38.9 (3.8) | 28.1 (−2.2) | 51.7 (10.9) |
| Mean daily minimum °F (°C) | 14.3 (−9.8) | 18.0 (−7.8) | 28.1 (−2.2) | 38.2 (3.4) | 49.9 (9.9) | 60.0 (15.6) | 65.0 (18.3) | 63.0 (17.2) | 53.6 (12.0) | 40.4 (4.7) | 27.7 (−2.4) | 18.2 (−7.7) | 39.7 (4.3) |
| Mean minimum °F (°C) | −8.6 (−22.6) | −4.0 (−20.0) | 7.4 (−13.7) | 23.7 (−4.6) | 35.2 (1.8) | 46.9 (8.3) | 53.6 (12.0) | 50.9 (10.5) | 36.1 (2.3) | 24.8 (−4.0) | 10.5 (−11.9) | −2.7 (−19.3) | −10.7 (−23.7) |
| Record low °F (°C) | −33 (−36) | −32 (−36) | −17 (−27) | −2 (−19) | 21 (−6) | 34 (1) | 42 (6) | 36 (2) | 22 (−6) | 5 (−15) | −11 (−24) | −29 (−34) | −33 (−36) |
| Average precipitation inches (mm) | 0.55 (14) | 0.70 (18) | 1.57 (40) | 2.73 (69) | 4.47 (114) | 4.01 (102) | 3.47 (88) | 3.47 (88) | 2.13 (54) | 2.18 (55) | 1.18 (30) | 0.86 (22) | 27.32 (694) |
| Average snowfall inches (cm) | 4.7 (12) | 6.2 (16) | 3.0 (7.6) | 1.8 (4.6) | 0.0 (0.0) | 0.0 (0.0) | 0.0 (0.0) | 0.0 (0.0) | 0.0 (0.0) | 0.4 (1.0) | 2.2 (5.6) | 4.1 (10) | 22.4 (57) |
| Average precipitation days (≥ 0.01 in) | 3.8 | 4.8 | 6.2 | 8.6 | 10.9 | 9.6 | 8.8 | 8.2 | 6.3 | 6.7 | 4.2 | 4.0 | 82.1 |
| Average snowy days (≥ 0.1 in) | 2.6 | 3.1 | 1.3 | 0.8 | 0.0 | 0.0 | 0.0 | 0.0 | 0.0 | 0.2 | 1.3 | 2.6 | 11.9 |
Source: NOAA (mean maxima/minima 1899–2009)

== Demographics ==
Historical population
| Census | Pop. | Note | %± |
|---|---|---|---|
| 1880 | 482 | | — |
| 1890 | 1,263 | | 162.0% |
| 1900 | 1,475 | | 16.8% |
| 1910 | 1,336 | | −9.4% |
| 1920 | 1,615 | | 20.9% |
| 1930 | 1,621 | | 0.4% |
| 1940 | 1,571 | | −3.1% |
| 1950 | 1,676 | | 6.7% |
| 1960 | 1,714 | | 2.3% |
| 1970 | 2,026 | | 18.2% |
| 1980 | 2,094 | | 3.4% |
| 1990 | 2,009 | | −4.1% |
| 2000 | 2,218 | | 10.4% |
| 2010 | 2,290 | | 3.2% |
| 2020 | 2,416 | | 5.5% |
U.S. Decennial Census; 2012 Estimate

=== 2020 census ===
As of the 2020 census, St. Paul had a population of 2,416. The median age was 40.4 years. 26.2% of residents were under the age of 18 and 23.4% of residents were 65 years of age or older. For every 100 females there were 88.5 males, and for every 100 females age 18 and over there were 83.0 males age 18 and over.

0.0% of residents lived in urban areas, while 100.0% lived in rural areas.

There were 961 households in St. Paul, of which 32.7% had children under the age of 18 living in them. Of all households, 49.0% were married-couple households, 16.4% were households with a male householder and no spouse or partner present, and 26.8% were households with a female householder and no spouse or partner present. About 31.9% of all households were made up of individuals and 16.8% had someone living alone who was 65 years of age or older.

There were 1,014 housing units, of which 5.2% were vacant. The homeowner vacancy rate was 1.8% and the rental vacancy rate was 0.4%.

Racial composition as of the 2020 census
| Race | Number | Percent |
|---|---|---|
| White | 2,316 | 95.9% |
| Black or African American | 4 | 0.2% |
| American Indian and Alaska Native | 9 | 0.4% |
| Asian | 10 | 0.4% |
| Native Hawaiian and Other Pacific Islander | 0 | 0.0% |
| Some other race | 15 | 0.6% |
| Two or more races | 62 | 2.6% |
| Hispanic or Latino (of any race) | 57 | 2.4% |

=== 2010 census ===
As of the census of 2010, there were 2,290 people, 989 households, and 590 families residing in the city. The population density was 2,063.1 inhabitants per square mile (796.6/km^{2}). There were 1,093 housing units at an average density of 984.7 per square mile (380.2/km^{2}). The racial makeup of the city was 98.1% White, 0.3% African American, 0.1% Native American, 0.1% Asian, and 1.3% from two or more races. Hispanic or Latino of any race were 1.4% of the population.

There were 989 households, of which 29.4% had children under the age of 18 living with them, 47.3% were married couples living together, 9.2% had a female householder with no husband present, 3.1% had a male householder with no wife present, and 40.3% were non-families. 36.1% of all households were made up of individuals, and 21.8% had someone living alone who was 65 years of age or older. The average household size was 2.28 and the average family size was 3.00.

The median age in the city was 40.3 years. 26% of residents were under the age of 18; 6% were between the ages of 18 and 24; 22.9% were from 25 to 44; 24% were from 45 to 64; and 21.1% were 65 years of age or older. The gender makeup of the city was 48.3% male and 51.7% female.

=== 2000 census ===
As of the census of 2000, there were 2,218 people, 935 households, and 584 families residing in the city. The population density was 2,083.8 inhabitants per square mile (804.6/km^{2}). There were 1,020 housing units at an average density of 958.3 per square mile (370.0/km^{2}). The racial makeup of the city was 99.37% White, 0.23% African American, 0.18% Native American, 0.14% Asian, and 0.09% from two or more races. Hispanic or Latino of any race were 0.86% of the population.

There were 935 households, out of which 32.2% had children under the age of 18 living with them, 49.8% were married couples living together, 9.2% had a female householder with no husband present, and 37.5% were non-families. 34.4% of all households were made up of individuals, and 22.8% had someone living alone who was 65 years of age or older. The average household size was 2.33 and the average family size was 3.01.

In the city, the population was spread out, with 27.1% under the age of 18, 6.8% from 18 to 24, 24.0% from 25 to 44, 19.3% from 45 to 64, and 22.9% who were 65 years of age or older. The median age was 39 years. For every 100 females, there were 92.2 males. For every 100 females age 18 and over, there were 81.8 males.

As of 2000 the median income for a household in the city was $31,818, and the median income for a family was $43,571. Males had a median income of $32,051 versus $19,776 for females. The per capita income for the city was $17,596. About 5.8% of families and 8.3% of the population were below the poverty line, including 7.3% of those under age 18 and 17.2% of those age 65 or over.

== Notable people ==
- Jon Christensen, U.S. representative from Nebraska
- Dorothy Lynch, creator of Dorothy Lynch salad dressing
- Vickie D. McDonald, Nebraska state senator
- Reynold Nesiba, minority leader of the South Dakota Senate
- Jean Potts, author and Edgar Award recipient
- Leander Herron, Medal of Honor recipient Leander Herron
- Clarence Irvine, Lieutenant General United States Air Force Clarence Irvine
