= Dorothy Lynch =

American brand of salad dressing

- Product type: Salad dressing
- Current owner: Tasty Toppings
- Country: United States
- Introduced: 1964
- Website: www.dorothylynch.com

Dorothy Lynch is a brand of salad dressing originating in the 1940s and 1960s in St. Paul, Nebraska, currently produced by the Tasty Toppings company. The dressing, which is also used as a dip and condiment in Nebraska, is a reddish-orange and resembles French dressing but has the addition of celery seed and other flavorings.

== History ==
A garden salad dressed with Dorothy Lynch dressing

Per legend, the dressing was created by a woman of the same name, who with her husband ran a restaurant at the Legion Club in Saint Paul, Nebraska, in the late 1940s. As the popularity of her homemade dressing grew among patrons, they began to bring in bottles and jars from home asking them to be filled, and she decided to commercialize her creation. The family soon began producing the dressing in bulk, first at the Legion Club, then in their basement, and eventually moved production into a small building in Saint Paul where Dorothy and her daughter operated the Red Carpet Salon.

The dressing was patented in 1951, and in 1964 the brand and recipe were sold to Gordon "Mac" Hull, who established the brand's factory in Columbus, Nebraska, near the Columbus Municipal Airport. In 1979, the operation moved to its current 65,000-square-foot factory in nearby Duncan, Nebraska.
