= St. Libory, Nebraska =

- Census-designated place
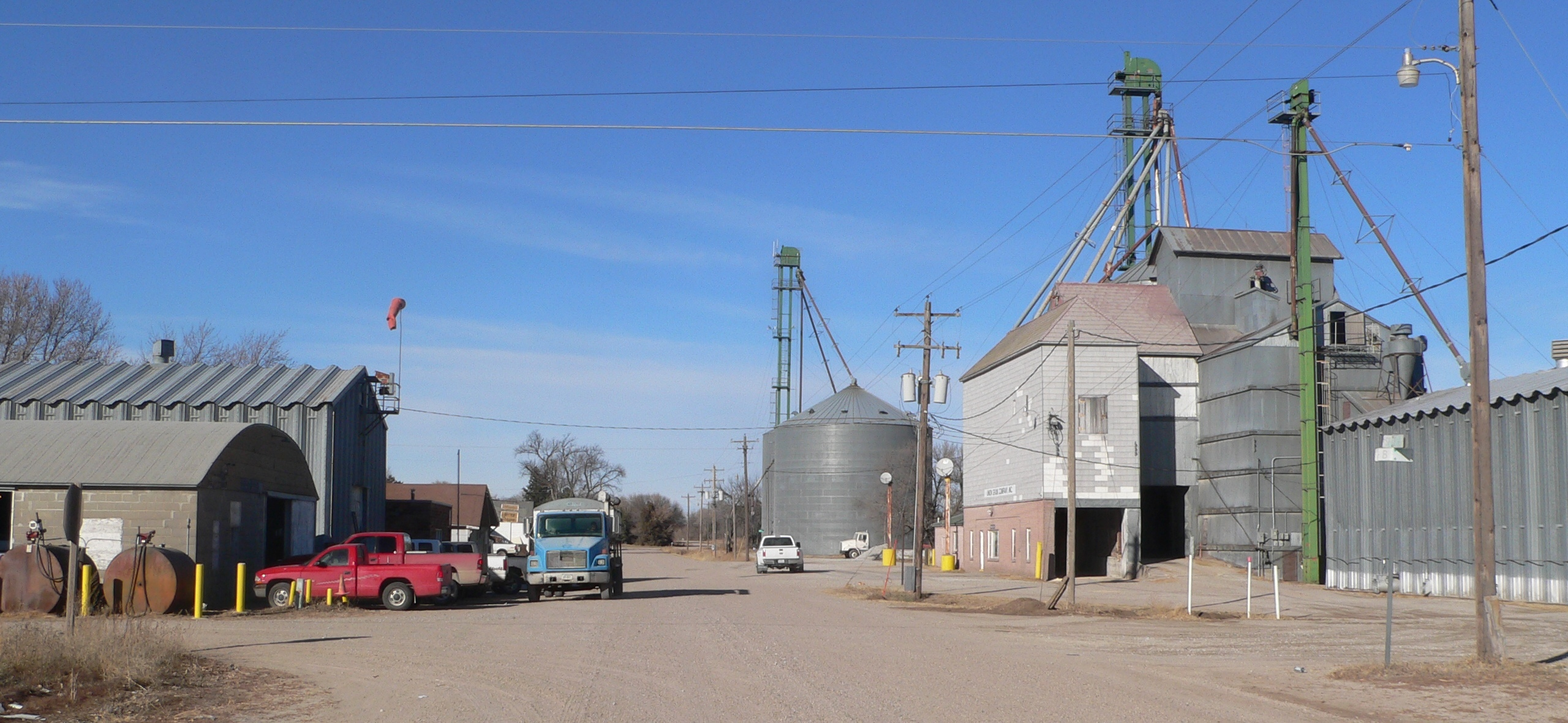
- Spruce Street, St. Libory

- Location within Nebraska Location within the United States
- Coordinates: 41°04′56″N 98°21′33″W
- Country: United States
- State: Nebraska
- County: Howard

Area
  - Total: 0.33 sq mi (0.86 km^{2})
  - Land: 0.33 sq mi (0.86 km^{2})
  - Water: 0 sq mi (0.00 km^{2})
- Elevation: 1,864 ft (568 m)

Population (2020)
  - Total: 241
  - Density: 725.8/sq mi (280.25/km^{2})
- Time zone: UTC-6 (Central (CST))
  - Summer (DST): UTC-5 (CDT)
- ZIP code: 68872
- FIPS code: 31-43160
- GNIS feature ID: 2583897

St. Libory or Saint Libory is an unincorporated community and census-designated place (CDP) in southeastern Howard County, Nebraska, United States. As of the 2020 census, St. Libory had a population of 241.

It lies along U.S. Route 281, 11 miles (18 km) southeast of the city of St. Paul, the county seat of Howard County. Its elevation is 1,863 feet (568 m) above sea level. Although St. Libory is unincorporated, it has a post office, with the ZIP code of 68872. St. Libory is known in the region for its fresh melon market.

== Demographics ==
Historical population
Census	Pop.	Note	%±
2020	241		—
U.S. Decennial Census

== History ==
St. Libory got its start when the Union Pacific Railroad was extended to that point. It was named after the village of St. Libory, Illinois. The first post office in St. Libory was established in 1878.

On May 17, 2026, a high-end EF3 tornado hit north of the community, significantly damaging at least three homes.

== See also ==
- Liborius of Le Mans
