= Dannevirke, Nebraska =

Unincorporated community in Nebraska, United States

- Unincorporated Community
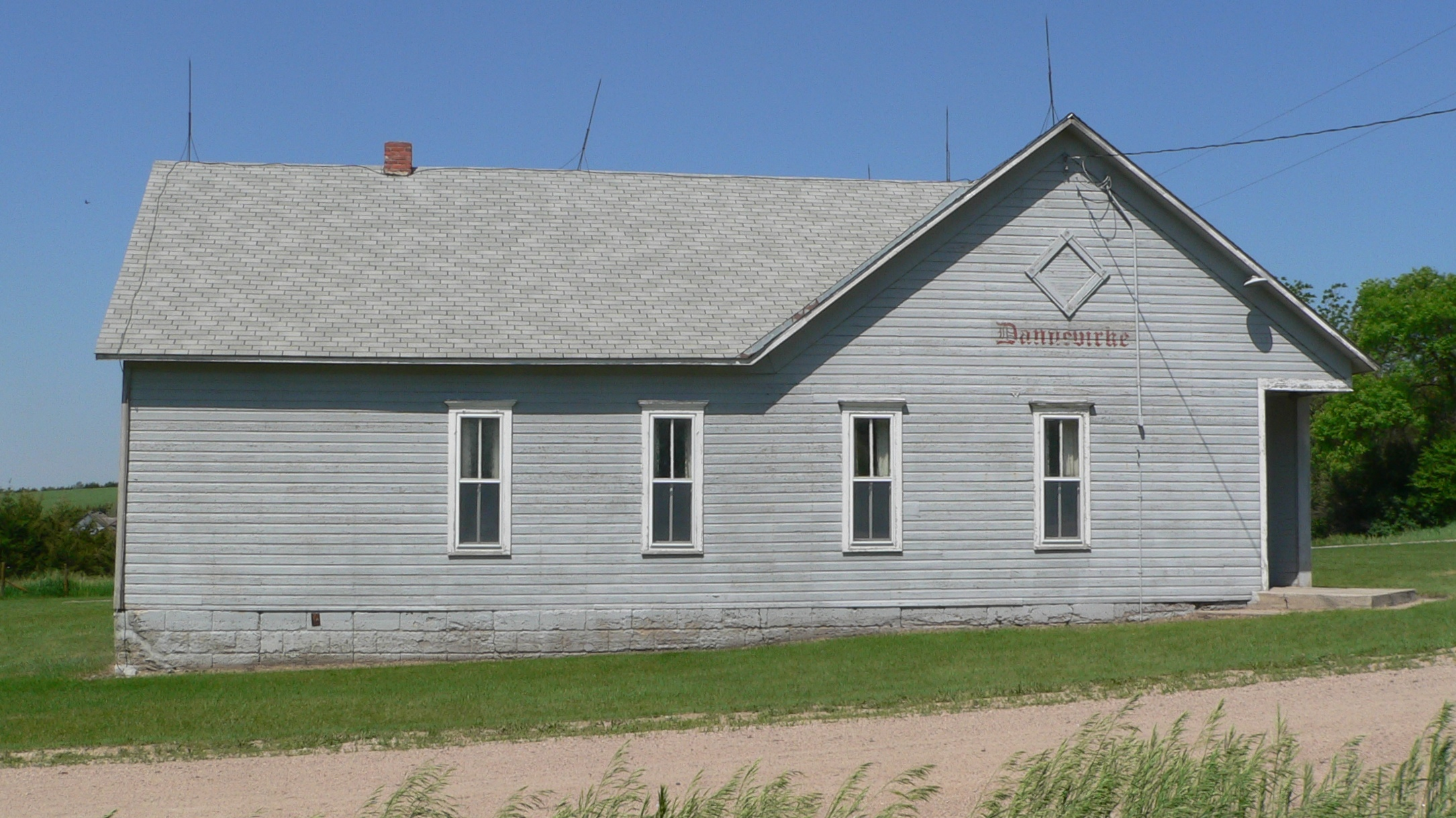
- Dannevirke Community Hall

- Location within Nebraska Location within the United States
- Coordinates: 41.3°N 98.7°W
- Country: United States
- State: Nebraska
- County: Howard

Dannevirke is an unincorporated community in Howard County, Nebraska, United States.

== History ==
A post office was established at Dannevirke in the 1880s. A majority of the early settlers being natives of Denmark caused the name of Dannevirke, for the old Danish fortification, to be selected.
