= Sioux City metropolitan area =

Coordinates: 42°30′N 96°24′W

Sioux City Metropolitan Area
- Metropolitan Statistical Area
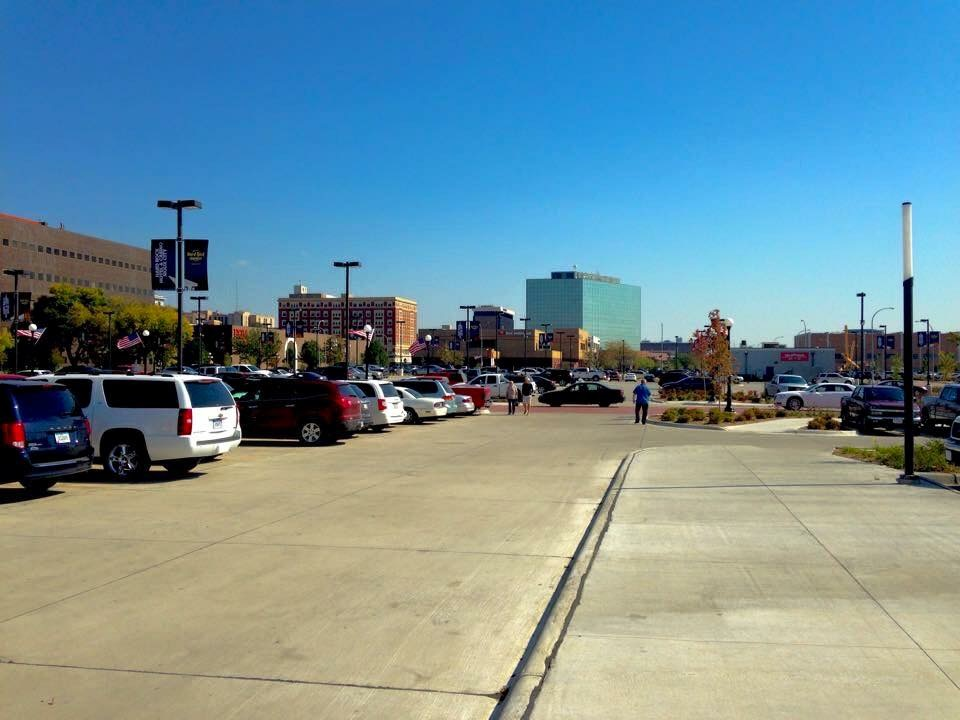
- Skyline of Sioux City
Map of Sioux City–Le Mars, IA–NE–SD CSA
Sioux City
Sioux City, IA–NE–SD MSA
Le Mars, IA µSA
- Country: United States
- State: Iowa; Nebraska; South Dakota
- Principal city: Sioux City
- Time zone: UTC−6 (CST)
  - Summer (DST): UTC−5 (CDT)

The Sioux City metropolitan statistical area, as defined by the United States Census Bureau, is an area consisting of four counties in three states – Iowa, Nebraska, and South Dakota, anchored by the city of Sioux City, Iowa. As of the 2020 census, the MSA had a population of 145,940. Plymouth County, Iowa, was removed from the definition of the MSA prior to the 2020 census.

== Counties ==
- Woodbury County, Iowa
- Dakota County, Nebraska
- Dixon County, Nebraska
- Union County, South Dakota
- Plymouth County, Iowa, until 2020

== Communities ==
=== Places with more than 80,000 inhabitants ===
- Sioux City, Iowa (Principal city)

=== Places with 10,000 to 15,000 inhabitants ===
- South Sioux City, Nebraska

=== Places with 1,000 to 10,000 inhabitants ===
- Beresford, South Dakota
- Dakota City, Nebraska
- Elk Point, South Dakota
- Moville, Iowa
- North Sioux City, South Dakota
- Ponca, Nebraska
- Sergeant Bluff, Iowa
- Sloan, Iowa
- Wakefield, Nebraska

=== Places with 500 to 1,000 inhabitants ===
- Alcester, South Dakota
- Anthon, Iowa
- Correctionville, Iowa
- Emerson, Nebraska
- Homer, Nebraska
- Jefferson, South Dakota
- Lawton, Iowa

=== Places with less than 500 inhabitants ===
- Bronson, Iowa
- Cushing, Iowa
- Danbury, Iowa
- Hornick, Iowa
- Oto, Iowa
- Pierson, Iowa
- Salix, Iowa
- Smithland, Iowa
- Allen, Nebraska
- Concord, Nebraska
- Dixon, Nebraska
- Hubbard, Nebraska
- Jackson, Nebraska
- Martinsburg, Nebraska
- Maskell, Nebraska
- Newcastle, Nebraska
- Waterbury, Nebraska

=== Unincorporated places ===
- Alsen, South Dakota
- Climbing Hill, Iowa
- Garryowen, South Dakota
- Luton, Iowa
- Nora, South Dakota
- Richland, South Dakota
- Spink, South Dakota
- Willis, Nebraska

== Townships ==
=== Woodbury County, Iowa ===
- Arlington
- Banner
- Concord
- Floyd
- Grange
- Grant
- Kedron
- Lakeport
- Liberty
- Liston
- Little Sioux
- Miller
- Morgan
- Moville
- Oto
- Rock
- Rutland
- Sioux City
- Sloan
- Union
- West Fork
- Willow
- Wolf Creek
- Woodbury

=== Dixon County, Nebraska ===
- Clark
- Concord
- Daily
- Emerson
- Galena
- Hooker
- Logan
- Newcastle
- Ottercreek
- Ponca
- Silvercreek
- Springbank
- Wakefield

=== Union County, South Dakota ===
- Alcester
- Big Sioux
- Big Springs
- Brule
- Civil Bend
- Elk Point
- Emmet
- Jefferson
- Prairie
- Sioux Valley
- Spink
- Virginia

== Demographics ==
Historical population
Census	Pop.	Note	%±
1990	115,018		—
2000	143,005		24.3%
2010	168,825		18.1%
2020	145,940		−13.6%
U.S. Decennial Census; Plymouth County, Iowa, was removed from the MSA prior to the 2020 census.

As of the census of 2000, there were 143,005 people, 53,586 households, and 36,735 families residing within the MSA. The racial makeup of the MSA was 87.40% White, 1.58% African American, 1.54% Native American, 2.31% Asian, 0.04% Pacific Islander, 5.19% from other races, and 1.93% from two or more races. Hispanic or Latino of any race were 10.17% of the population.

The median income for a household in the MSA was $39,084, and the median income for a family was $45,638. Males had a median income of $30,799 versus $22,162 for females. The per capita income for the MSA was $18,650.

The Sioux City Human Rights Commission is an impartial governmental agency that works to protect the rights of the diverse population who live and work in Sioux City.

== Combined statistical area ==
The Sioux City–Vermillion combined statistical area (CSA) is made up of five counties in three states: Iowa, Nebraska, and South Dakota. The statistical area includes one metropolitan area and one micropolitan area. The CSA had a population population of 175,638 as of 2020.

- Metropolitan statistical areas (MSAs)
  - Sioux City, Iowa (Woodbury County, Iowa; Plymouth County, Iowa; Dakota County, Nebraska; Dixon County, Nebraska; Wayne County, Nebraska; and Union County, South Dakota)
- Micropolitan statistical areas (μSAs)
  - Vermillion (Clay County, South Dakota)

== Media ==
Sioux City, Iowa has been featured in an Independent Lens series documenting bullying.

The Sioux City metropolitan area is also featured in the book 100 Things to Do in Sioux City & Siouxland Before You Die by Lindsay Hindman (Reedy Press, Sept. 2020)

== See also ==
- Iowa census statistical areas
- Nebraska census statistical areas
- Siouxland
- South Dakota census statistical areas
