= Dix, Nebraska =

Village in Kimball County, Nebraska, United States

- Village
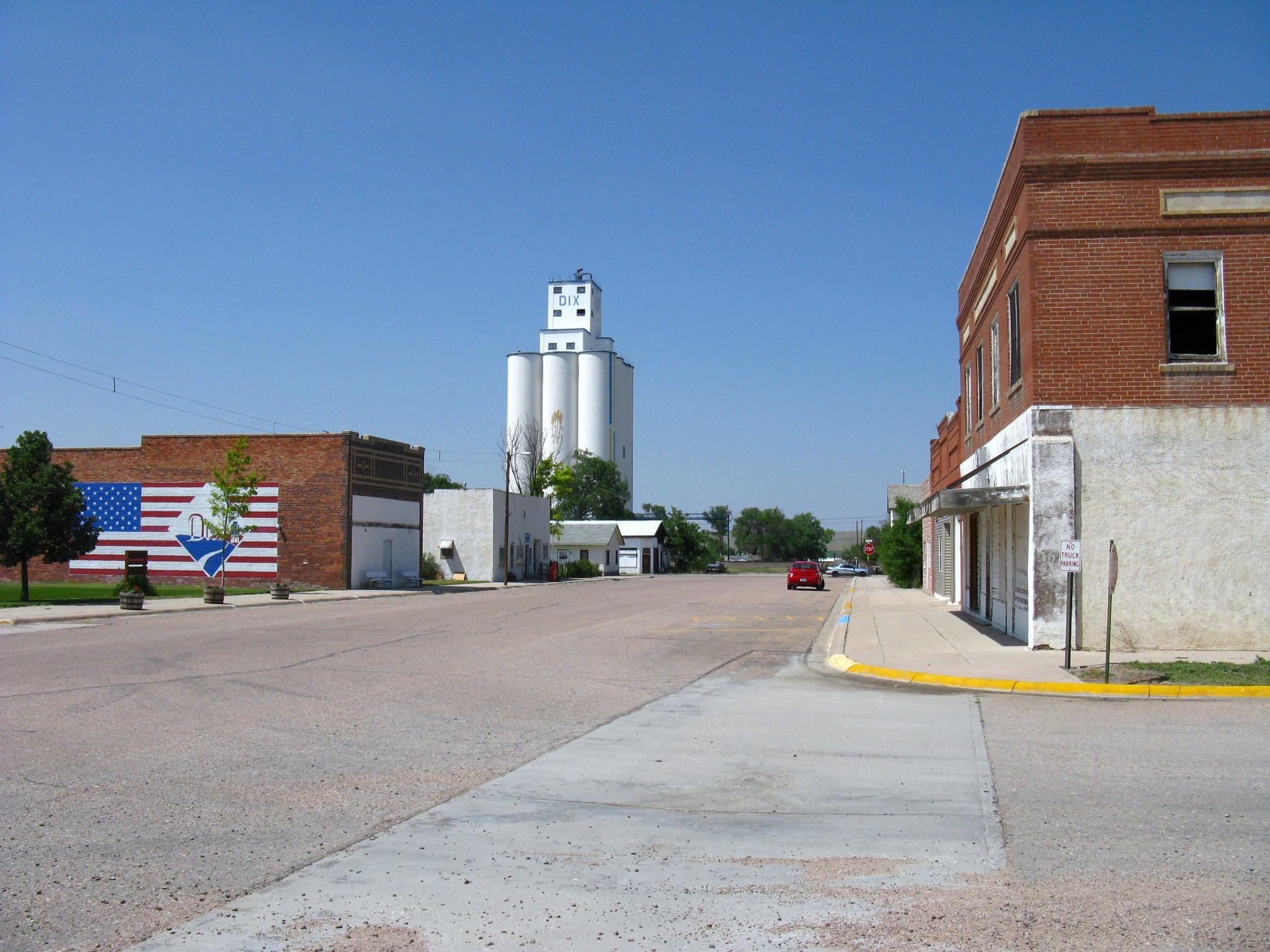
- Dix, June 2008

- Location of Dix, Nebraska
- Coordinates: 41°14′03″N 103°29′12″W
- Country: United States
- State: Nebraska
- County: Kimball

Area
  - Total: 0.22 sq mi (0.57 km^{2})
  - Land: 0.22 sq mi (0.57 km^{2})
  - Water: 0 sq mi (0.00 km^{2})
- Elevation: 4,554 ft (1,388 m)

Population (2020)
  - Total: 187
  - Density: 850.7/sq mi (328.45/km^{2})
- Time zone: UTC-7 (Mountain (MST))
  - Summer (DST): UTC-6 (MDT)
- ZIP code: 69133
- Area code: 308
- FIPS code: 31-13190
- GNIS feature ID: 2398730

Dix is a village in Kimball County, Nebraska, United States. The population was 187 at the 2020 census.

== History ==
Originally a siding on the Union Pacific Railroad, Dix was founded as a settlement in 1886. The community derives its name from Dixon, Illinois, the former home of an early settler. However, it was deemed necessary to shorten the name to "Dix", in order to avoid repetition with Dixon. State highway 30 runs through Dix, and in 1995 was changed from "Main" street to "Miller" street (within the city limits of Dix). This was done in honor of Fred H. Miller, who worked for the Union Pacific for 30 years and ran the town's train depot. The train depot was dismantled after Fred's retirement. Fred also served on the town board, and lived two blocks away from the depot next to the city park with his wife Ada B. Miller. Their memorial stone is located in the graveyard south of town, near Interstate 80.

== Geography ==
According to the United States Census Bureau, the village has a total area of 0.22 square miles (0.57 km^{2}), all land.

== Demographics ==
Historical population
Census	Pop.	Note	%±
1920	248		—
1930	279		12.5%
1940	199		−28.7%
1950	270		35.7%
1960	420		55.6%
1970	342		−18.6%
1980	275		−19.6%
1990	229		−16.7%
2000	267		16.6%
2010	255		−4.5%
2020	187		−26.7%
U.S. Decennial Census; 2012 Estimate

=== 2010 census ===
As of the census of 2010, there were 255 people, 103 households, and 74 families residing in the village. The population density was 1,159.1 inhabitants per square mile (447.5/km^{2}). There were 119 housing units at an average density of 540.9 per square mile (208.8/km^{2}). The racial makeup of the village was 95.3% White, 2.0% Native American, 1.2% Asian, 0.8% from other races, and 0.8% from two or more races. Hispanic or Latino of any race were 4.3% of the population.

There were 103 households, of which 35.9% had children under the age of 18 living with them, 54.4% were married couples living together, 5.8% had a female householder with no husband present, 11.7% had a male householder with no wife present, and 28.2% were non-families. 24.3% of all households were made up of individuals, and 10.7% had someone living alone who was 65 years of age or older. The average household size was 2.48 and the average family size was 2.86.

The median age in the village was 38.8 years. 26.3% of residents were under the age of 18; 5.4% were between the ages of 18 and 24; 26% were from 25 to 44; 24.3% were from 45 to 64; and 18% were 65 years of age or older. The gender makeup of the village was 51.0% male and 49.0% female.

=== 2000 census ===
As of the census of 2000, there were 267 people, 107 households, and 71 families residing in the village. The population density was 1,224.0 inhabitants per square mile (472.6/km^{2}). There were 112 housing units at an average density of 513.4 per square mile (198.2/km^{2}). The racial makeup of the village was 97.00% White, 3.00% from other races. Hispanic or Latino of any race were 4.12% of the population.

There were 107 households, out of which 30.8% had children under the age of 18 living with them, 57.9% were married couples living together, 6.5% had a female householder with no husband present, and 33.6% were non-families. 28.0% of all households were made up of individuals, and 14.0% had someone living alone who was 65 years of age or older. The average household size was 2.50 and the average family size was 3.07.

In the village, the population was spread out, with 27.3% under the age of 18, 8.6% from 18 to 24, 24.3% from 25 to 44, 24.3% from 45 to 64, and 15.4% who were 65 years of age or older. The median age was 38 years. For every 100 females, there were 107.0 males. For every 100 females age 18 and over, there were 92.1 males.

As of 2000 the median income for a household in the village was $31,094, and the median income for a family was $34,167. Males had a median income of $25,625 versus $20,000 for females. The per capita income for the village was $15,997. About 6.9% of families and 9.9% of the population were below the poverty line, including 5.7% of those under the age of eighteen and 4.4% of those 65 or over.

== See also ==
- List of municipalities in Nebraska
