= Newcastle Township =

Newcastle Township may refer to one of the following places in the United States:

- Newcastle Township, Fulton County, Indiana
- Newcastle Township, Dixon County, Nebraska
- Newcastle Township, Coshocton County, Ohio

== See also ==
- New Castle Township, Pennsylvania
- Newcastle (disambiguation)
