= Allen, Nebraska =

Village in Dixon County, Nebraska, United States

- Village
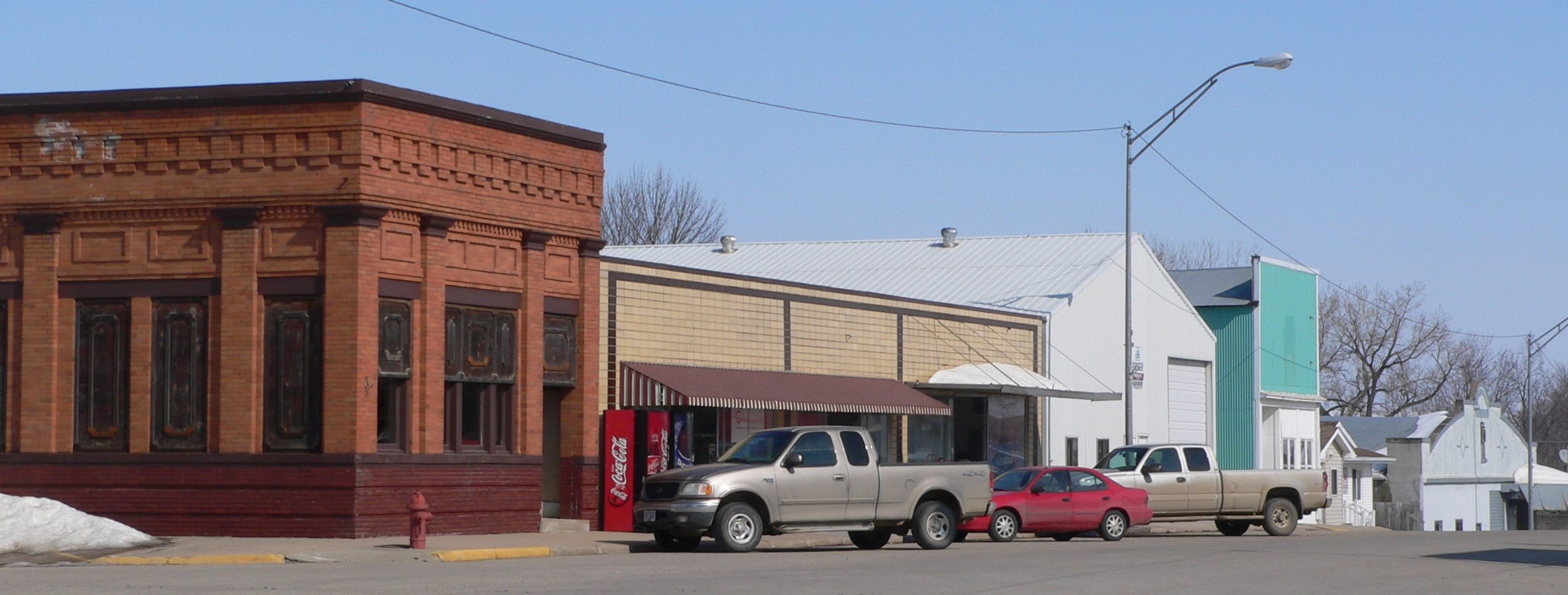
- Downtown Allen: north side of 2nd Street, east of Clark Street, March 2010
- Motto: "A Family Town On The Grow" or "Small Town With a Big Heart"
- Location of Allen, Nebraska

- Location within Nebraska Location within the United States
- Coordinates: 42°24′52″N 96°50′36″W
- Country: United States
- State: Nebraska
- County: Dixon
- Township: Springbank

Area
  - Total: 0.37 sq mi (0.96 km^{2})
  - Land: 0.37 sq mi (0.96 km^{2})
  - Water: 0 sq mi (0.00 km^{2})
- Elevation: 1,526 ft (465 m)

Population (2020)
  - Total: 355
  - Density: 953.8/sq mi (368.28/km^{2})
- Time zone: UTC-6 (Central (CST))
  - Summer (DST): UTC-5 (CDT)
- ZIP code: 68710
- Area code: 402
- FIPS code: 31-00870
- GNIS feature ID: 2397934
- Website: villageofallen.com

Allen is a village in Dixon County, Nebraska, United States. It is located south of US Hwy 20 on NE Hwy 9 between Martinsburg, NE and Wakefield, NE. It is part of the Sioux City, IA–NE–SD Metropolitan Statistical Area. As of the 2020 census, Allen had a population of 355.

== History ==
Allen was established in 1890 when the railroad was extended to that point. It was named for Henry Allen, the original owner of the town site. Allen was incorporated as a village in 1893.

== Geography ==
According to the United States Census Bureau, the village has a total area of 0.37 square miles (0.96 km^{2}), all land.

== Demographics ==
Historical population
Census	Pop.	Note	%±
1900	236		—
1910	371		57.2%
1920	485		30.7%
1930	489		0.8%
1940	404		−17.4%
1950	374		−7.4%
1960	350		−6.4%
1970	309		−11.7%
1980	390		26.2%
1990	331		−15.1%
2000	411		24.2%
2010	377		−8.3%
2020	355		−5.8%
U.S. Decennial Census

=== 2010 census ===
As of the census of 2010, there were 377 people, 159 households, and 101 families residing in the village. The population density was 1,018.9 inhabitants per square mile (393.4/km^{2}). There were 176 housing units at an average density of 475.7 per square mile (183.7/km^{2}). The racial makeup of the village was 98.1% White, 0.3% African American, 0.3% Asian, and 1.3% from other races. Hispanic or Latino of any race were 3.4% of the population.

There were 159 households, of which 32.1% had children under the age of 18 living with them, 45.3% were married couples living together, 13.2% had a female householder with no husband present, 5.0% had a male householder with no wife present, and 36.5% were non-families. 34.0% of all households were made up of individuals, and 15.7% had someone living alone who was 65 years of age or older. The average household size was 2.37 and the average family size was 2.96.

The median age in the village was 39.8 years. 28.9% of residents were under the age of 18; 5.3% were between the ages of 18 and 24; 23.4% were from 25 to 44; 23.6% were from 45 to 64; and 18.8% were 65 years of age or older. The gender makeup of the village was 47.2% male and 52.8% female.

=== 2000 census ===
As of the census of 2000, there were 411 people, 166 households, and 111 families residing in the village. The population density was 1,096.5 inhabitants per square mile (423.4/km^{2}). There were 180 housing units at an average density of 480.2 per square mile (185.4/km^{2}). The racial makeup of the village was 99.03% White, 0.49% from other races, and 0.49% from two or more races. Hispanic or Latino of any race were 0.97% of the population.

There were 166 households, out of which 28.3% had children under the age of 18 living with them, 58.4% were married couples living together, 6.0% had a female householder with no husband present, and 33.1% were non-families. 26.5% of all households were made up of individuals, and 18.1% had someone living alone who was 65 years of age or older. The average household size was 2.48 and the average family size was 3.05.

In the village, the population was spread out, with 27.5% under the age of 18, 5.1% from 18 to 24, 24.3% from 25 to 44, 19.7% from 45 to 64, and 23.4% who were 65 years of age or older. The median age was 40 years. For every 100 females, there were 91.2 males. For every 100 females age 18 and over, there were 88.6 males.

As of 2000 the median income for a household in the village was $34,000, and the median income for a family was $40,521. Males had a median income of $30,341 versus $15,769 for females. The per capita income for the village was $15,264. About 1.8% of families and 4.6% of the population were below the poverty line, including none of those under age 18 and 11.2% of those age 65 or over.

== See also ==
- List of municipalities in Nebraska
