= List of municipalities in Nebraska =

Cities in the State of Nebraska

A map of the United States with the state of Nebraska highlighted

Nebraska is a state located in the Midwestern United States. As of the 2020 census, 1,961,504 (97.12%) of the 2,018,006 residents of Nebraska lived in a municipality in the 2025 estimate.

Nebraska is the 38th-most populous state and 15th-largest by land area, spanning 76,815.245 square miles (198,950.57 km^{2}) of land. Nebraska is divided into 93 counties and contains 528 municipalities consisting of cities.

== City required ==
Incorporated communities in Nebraska are legally classified as cities or villages, depending on their population: a village is a municipality of 100 through 800 inhabitants, whereas a city must have at least 800 inhabitants. Of Nebraska's 528 municipalities, 147 are cities and 381 are villages.

== Municipalities ==
As of May 2026, the 528 Nebraska municipalities include 147 cities and 381 villages.

County seat
State capital and county seat

2025 rank	Municipality	Designation	Primary county	Secondary county(ies)	Population		
2025 rank	Municipality	Designation	Primary county	Secondary county(ies)	2025 Estimate	2020 census	2020–2025 Change
1	Omaha	City	Douglas		488,797	486,051	+0.56%
2	Lincoln	City	Lancaster		301,522	291,082	+3.59%
3	Bellevue	City	Sarpy		64,863	64,176	+1.07%
4	Grand Island	City	Hall		53,943	53,131	+1.53%
5	Kearney	City	Buffalo		34,782	33,790	+2.94%
6	Fremont	City	Dodge		28,350	27,141	+4.45%
7	Norfolk	City	Madison		26,677	24,955	+6.90%
8	Columbus	City	Platte		25,248	24,028	+5.08%
9	Papillion	City	Sarpy		25,127	24,159	+4.01%
10	Hastings	City	Adams		25,121	25,152	−0.12%
11	North Platte	City	Lincoln		22,524	23,390	−3.70%
12	La Vista	City	Sarpy		16,543	16,746	−1.21%
13	Scottsbluff	City	Scotts Bluff		14,259	14,436	−1.23%
14	South Sioux City	City	Dakota		14,158	14,043	+0.82%
15	Beatrice	City	Gage		12,318	12,261	+0.46%
16	Lexington	City	Dawson		11,176	10,348	+8.00%
17	Gretna	City	Sarpy		9,207	5,083	+81.13%
18	Gering	City	Scotts Bluff		8,535	8,564	−0.34%
19	York	City	York		8,284	8,066	+2.70%
20	Blair	City	Washington		7,997	7,790	+2.66%
21	Alliance	City	Box Butte		7,914	8,151	−2.91%
22	Seward	City	Seward		7,892	7,643	+3.26%
23	Crete	City	Saline		7,747	7,099	+9.13%
24	Nebraska City	City	Otoe		7,512	7,222	+4.02%
25	McCook	City	Red Willow		7,157	7,446	−3.88%
26	Plattsmouth	City	Cass		6,955	6,544	+6.28%
27	Schuyler	City	Colfax		6,800	6,547	+3.86%
28	Sidney	City	Cheyenne		6,432	6,410	+0.34%
29	Ralston	City	Douglas		6,382	6,494	−1.72%
30	Wayne	City	Wayne		6,338	5,973	+6.11%
31	Holdrege	City	Phelps		5,555	5,515	+0.73%
32	Wahoo	City	Saunders		5,023	4,818	+4.25%
33	Chadron	City	Dawes		4,975	5,206	−4.44%
34	Aurora	City	Hamilton		4,787	4,678	+2.33%
35	Ogallala	City	Keith		4,698	4,878	−3.69%
36	Waverly	City	Lancaster		4,533	4,279	+5.94%
37	Falls City	City	Richardson		3,988	4,133	−3.51%
38	Cozad	City	Dawson		3,924	3,988	−1.60%
39	Fairbury	City	Jefferson		3,812	3,970	−3.98%
40	Hickman	City	Lancaster		3,663	2,607	+40.51%
41	O'Neill	City	Holt		3,567	3,581	−0.39%
42	Broken Bow	City	Custer		3,507	3,506	+0.03%
43	Auburn	City	Nemaha		3,498	3,470	+0.81%
44	Ashland	City	Saunders		3,483	3,086	+12.86%
45	Gothenburg	City	Dawson		3,430	3,478	−1.38%
46	Valley	City	Douglas		3,412	3,037	+12.35%
47	West Point	City	Cuming		3,411	3,500	−2.54%
48	Central City	City	Merrick		3,184	3,039	+4.77%
49	Minden	City	Kearney		3,133	3,118	+0.48%
50	David City	City	Butler		3,068	2,995	+2.44%
51	Valentine	City	Cherry		2,635	2,633	+0.08%
52	St. Paul	City	Howard		2,416	2,416	0.00%
53	Milford	City	Seward		2,286	2,155	+6.08%
54	Kimball	City	Kimball		2,271	2,290	−0.83%
55	Madison	City	Madison		2,162	2,283	−5.30%
56	Ord	City	Valley		2,121	2,113	+0.38%
57	Geneva	City	Fillmore		2,100	2,136	−1.69%
58	Dakota City	City	Dakota		2,080	2,081	−0.05%
59	Syracuse	City	Otoe		2,006	1,941	+3.35%
60	Wilber	City	Saline		1,978	1,937	+2.12%
61	Bennington	City	Douglas		1,968	2,026	−2.86%
62	Imperial	City	Chase		1,962	2,068	−5.13%
63	Gibbon	City	Buffalo		1,913	1,878	+1.86%
64	Pierce	City	Pierce		1,849	1,845	+0.22%
65	Superior	City	Nuckolls		1,821	1,825	−0.22%
66	Albion	City	Boone		1,735	1,699	+2.12%
67	Tekamah	City	Burt		1,705	1,714	−0.53%
68	Tecumseh	City	Johnson		1,695	1,694	+0.06%
69	Ainsworth	City	Brown		1,585	1,616	−1.92%
70	Neligh	City	Antelope		1,551	1,536	+0.98%
71	Hartington	City	Cedar		1,530	1,517	+0.86%
72	Springfield	City	Sarpy		1,529	1,501	+1.87%
73	Wakefield	City	Dixon	Wayne	1,527	1,522	+0.33%
74	Mitchell	City	Scotts Bluff		1,513	1,548	−2.26%
75	Stanton	City	Stanton		1,506	1,520	−0.92%
76	Sutton	City	Clay		1,466	1,447	+1.31%
77	Yutan	City	Saunders		1,451	1,347	+7.72%
78	Bridgeport	City	Morrill		1,421	1,454	−2.27%
79	Louisville	City	Cass		1,419	1,319	+7.58%
80	Gordon	City	Sheridan		1,417	1,504	−5.78%
81	Ravenna	City	Buffalo		1,397	1,441	−3.05%
82	Hebron	City	Thayer		1,384	1,458	−5.08%
83	Wymore	City	Gage		1,341	1,377	−2.61%
84	Oakland	City	Burt		1,337	1,369	−2.34%
85	Arlington	Village	Washington		1,329	1,300	+2.23%
86	Atkinson	City	Holt		1,316	1,306	+0.77%
87	Plainview	City	Pierce		1,284	1,282	+0.16%
88	North Bend	City	Dodge		1,263	1,279	−1.25%
89	Fullerton	City	Nance		1,228	1,244	−1.29%
90	Sutherland	Village	Lincoln		1,225	1,313	−6.70%
91	Wisner	City	Cuming		1,224	1,239	−1.21%
92	Eagle	Village	Cass		1,206	1,065	+13.24%
93	Battle Creek	City	Madison		1,188	1,194	−0.50%
94	Wood River	City	Hall		1,169	1,172	−0.26%
95	Stromsburg	City	Polk		1,159	1,143	+1.40%
96	Grant	City	Perkins		1,158	1,197	−3.26%
97	Creighton	City	Knox		1,113	1,147	−2.96%
98	Fort Calhoun	City	Washington		1,108	1,108	0.00%
99	Pender	Village	Thurston		1,106	1,115	−0.81%
100	Bennet	Village	Lancaster		1,104	1,082	+2.03%
101	Henderson	City	York		1,097	1,080	+1.57%
102	Bayard	City	Morrill		1,087	1,140	−4.65%
103	Cambridge	City	Furnas		1,066	1,071	−0.47%
104	Weeping Water	City	Cass		1,061	1,029	+3.11%
105	Shelton	Village	Buffalo	Hall	1,042	1,034	+0.77%
106	Terrytown	City	Scotts Bluff		1,040	1,057	−1.61%
107	Loup City	City	Sherman		1,026	1,053	−2.56%
108	Burwell	City	Garfield		1,018	1,087	−6.35%
109	Alma	City	Harlan		1,009	1,043	−3.26%
110	Elm Creek	Village	Buffalo		983	979	+0.41%
111	Ceresco	Village	Saunders		982	919	+6.86%
112	Tilden	City	Madison	Antelope	982	992	−1.01%
113	Laurel	City	Cedar		961	972	−1.13%
114	Arapahoe	City	Furnas		957	1,002	−4.49%
115	Harvard	City	Clay		952	951	+0.11%
116	Friend	City	Saline		950	954	−0.42%
117	Red Cloud	City	Webster		946	962	−1.66%
118	Bloomfield	City	Knox		941	986	−4.56%
119	Ponca	City	Dixon		933	907	+2.87%
120	Morrill	Village	Scotts Bluff		918	934	−1.71%
121	Waterloo	Village	Douglas		917	935	−1.93%
122	Winnebago	Village	Thurston		909	916	−0.76%
123	Kenesaw	Village	Adams		905	919	−1.52%
124	Randolph	City	Cedar	Pierce	892	879	+1.48%
125	Franklin	City	Franklin		883	941	−6.16%
126	Osceola	City	Polk		883	875	+0.91%
127	Humphrey	City	Platte		875	857	+2.10%
128	Genoa	City	Nance		868	894	−2.91%
129	Curtis	City	Frontier		843	806	+4.59%
130	Chappell	City	Deuel		839	844	−0.59%
131	Pawnee City	City	Pawnee		836	865	−3.35%
132	Utica	Village	Seward		831	840	−1.07%
133	Emerson	Village	Dixon	Dakota, Thurston	825	840	−1.79%
134	Cairo	Village	Hall		824	822	+0.24%
135	Doniphan	Village	Hall		819	809	+1.24%
136	Scribner	City	Dodge		814	843	−3.44%
137	Lyons	City	Burt		805	824	−2.31%
138	Osmond	City	Pierce		803	794	+1.13%
139	Hooper	City	Dodge		793	857	−7.47%
140	Blue Hill	City	Webster		789	805	−1.99%
141	Crawford	City	Dawes		780	840	−7.14%
142	Axtell	Village	Kearney		777	732	+6.15%
143	Oshkosh	City	Garden		775	809	−4.20%
144	Benkelman	City	Dundy		771	821	−6.09%
145	Humboldt	City	Richardson		768	800	−4.00%
146	Rushville	City	Sheridan		767	816	−6.00%
147	Crofton	City	Knox		761	756	+0.66%
148	Hemingford	Village	Box Butte		746	787	−5.21%
149	Deshler	City	Thayer		739	752	−1.73%
150	Shelby	Village	Polk		739	710	+4.08%
151	Juniata	Village	Adams		736	748	−1.60%
152	Clay Center	City	Clay		730	735	−0.68%
153	St. Edward	City	Boone		714	725	−1.52%
154	Walthill	Village	Thurston		713	682	+4.55%
155	Elgin	City	Antelope		706	717	−1.53%
156	Oxford	Village	Furnas	Harlan	701	718	−2.37%
157	Bertrand	Village	Phelps		698	709	−1.55%
158	Minatare	City	Scotts Bluff		696	715	−2.66%
159	Peru	City	Nemaha		696	648	+7.41%
160	Elmwood	Village	Cass		684	654	+4.59%
161	Alda	Village	Hall		654	647	+1.08%
162	Firth	Village	Lancaster		644	649	−0.77%
163	Beemer	Village	Cuming		643	611	+5.24%
164	Newman Grove	City	Madison		632	667	−5.25%
165	Clarkson	City	Colfax		630	641	−1.72%
166	Mead	Village	Saunders		628	617	+1.78%
167	Dorchester	Village	Saline		625	610	+2.46%
168	Adams	Village	Gage		623	604	+3.15%
169	Hershey	Village	Lincoln		617	649	−4.93%
170	Boys Town	Village	Douglas		616	410	+50.24%
171	Greenwood	Village	Cass		616	595	+3.53%
172	Cedar Bluffs	Village	Saunders		615	615	0.00%
173	Elwood	Village	Gosper		615	658	−6.53%
174	Valparaiso	Village	Saunders		608	595	+2.18%
175	Overton	Village	Dawson		594	607	−2.14%
176	Arnold	Village	Custer		591	592	−0.17%
177	Dodge	Village	Dodge		585	611	−4.26%
178	Wausa	Village	Knox		579	592	−2.20%
179	Fairmont	Village	Fillmore		575	592	−2.87%
180	Howells	Village	Colfax		573	561	+2.14%
181	Palmyra	Village	Otoe		565	534	+5.81%
182	Callaway	Village	Custer		561	563	−0.36%
183	Hay Springs	Village	Sheridan		555	599	−7.35%
184	Bassett	City	Rock		536	538	−0.37%
185	Verdigre	Village	Knox		532	554	−3.97%
186	Beaver City	City	Furnas		523	537	−2.61%
187	Homer	Village	Dakota		523	532	−1.69%
188	Coleridge	Village	Cedar		522	537	−2.79%
189	De Witt	Village	Saline		520	530	−1.89%
190	Cortland	Village	Gage		515	504	+2.18%
191	Wauneta	Village	Chase		515	549	−6.19%
192	Culbertson	Village	Hitchcock		511	534	−4.31%
193	Exeter	Village	Fillmore		511	523	−2.29%
194	Stuart	Village	Holt		506	486	+4.12%
195	Indianola	City	Red Willow		505	524	−3.63%
196	Murray	Village	Cass		502	480	+4.58%
197	Paxton	Village	Keith		502	516	−2.71%
198	Malcolm	Village	Lancaster		486	457	+6.35%
199	McCool Junction	Village	York		486	453	+7.28%
200	Bancroft	Village	Cuming		485	496	−2.22%
201	Sterling	Village	Johnson		481	480	+0.21%
202	Sargent	City	Custer		480	500	−4.00%
203	Cedar Creek	Village	Cass		476	465	+2.37%
204	Trenton	Village	Hitchcock		465	516	−9.88%
205	Leigh	Village	Colfax		462	435	+6.21%
206	Nelson	City	Nuckolls		462	456	+1.32%
207	Mullen	Village	Hooker		457	500	−8.60%
208	Ansley	Village	Custer		456	459	−0.65%
209	Hampton	Village	Hamilton		446	432	+3.24%
210	Palmer	Village	Merrick		443	439	+0.91%
211	Edgar	City	Clay		431	428	+0.70%
212	Santee	Village	Knox		429	424	+1.18%
213	Giltner	Village	Hamilton		421	406	+3.69%
214	Eustis	Village	Frontier		418	389	+7.46%
215	Bellwood	Village	Butler		414	407	+1.72%
216	Decatur	Village	Burt		411	410	+0.24%
217	Spalding	Village	Greeley		411	408	+0.74%
218	Big Springs	Village	Deuel		397	394	+0.76%
219	Duncan	Village	Platte		388	392	−1.02%
220	Loomis	Village	Phelps		387	391	−1.02%
221	Greeley Center	Village	Greeley		386	402	−3.98%
222	Cedar Rapids	Village	Boone		379	382	−0.79%
223	Pleasanton	Village	Buffalo		377	361	+4.43%
224	Ewing	Village	Holt		373	373	0.00%
225	Spencer	Village	Boyd		371	408	−9.07%
226	Kennard	Village	Washington		370	381	−2.89%
227	Inglewood	Village	Dodge		369	380	−2.89%
228	Beaver Crossing	Village	Seward		368	375	−1.87%
229	Winside	Village	Wayne		367	379	−3.17%
230	Hildreth	Village	Franklin		366	377	−2.92%
231	Brady	Village	Lincoln		365	383	−4.70%
232	Niobrara	Village	Knox		362	365	−0.82%
233	Rising City	Village	Butler		362	356	+1.69%
234	Allen	Village	Dixon		361	355	+1.69%
235	Plymouth	Village	Jefferson		359	364	−1.37%
236	Brainard	Village	Butler		353	336	+5.06%
237	Orchard	Village	Antelope		351	363	−3.31%
238	Merna	Village	Custer		344	343	+0.29%
239	Potter	Village	Cheyenne		343	342	+0.29%
240	Polk	Village	Polk		341	346	−1.45%
241	Shickley	Village	Fillmore		340	347	−2.02%
242	Platte Center	Village	Platte		339	333	+1.80%
243	Clarks	Village	Merrick		338	344	−1.74%
244	Fairfield	City	Clay		337	330	+2.12%
245	Phillips	Village	Hamilton		333	320	+4.06%
246	Lindsay	Village	Platte		331	283	+16.96%
247	Petersburg	Village	Boone		329	332	−0.90%
248	Clearwater	Village	Antelope		327	320	+2.19%
249	Orleans	Village	Harlan		327	341	−4.11%
250	Wilcox	Village	Kearney		327	330	−0.91%
251	Silver Creek	Village	Merrick		323	320	+0.94%
252	Hallam	Village	Lancaster		320	268	+19.40%
253	Lodgepole	Village	Cheyenne		315	312	+0.96%
254	Cook	Village	Johnson		314	319	−1.57%
255	Waco	Village	York		312	296	+5.41%
256	Davenport	Village	Thayer		307	319	−3.76%
257	Nickerson	Village	Dodge		307	312	−1.60%
258	Johnson	Village	Nemaha		305	309	−1.29%
259	Unadilla	Village	Otoe		305	296	+3.04%
260	Brule	Village	Keith		304	331	−8.16%
261	Stratton	Village	Hitchcock		304	310	−1.94%
262	Wallace	Village	Lincoln		299	318	−5.97%
263	Prague	Village	Saunders		292	291	+0.34%
264	Hadar	Village	Pierce		291	280	+3.93%
265	Long Pine	City	Brown		291	305	−4.59%
266	Monroe	Village	Platte		291	296	−1.69%
267	Chambers	Village	Holt		287	288	−0.35%
268	Dalton	Village	Cheyenne		285	284	+0.35%
269	Scotia	Village	Greeley		284	301	−5.65%
270	Arcadia	Village	Valley		282	283	−0.35%
271	Bradshaw	Village	York		282	273	+3.30%
272	Bruning	Village	Thayer		282	281	+0.36%
273	Newcastle	Village	Dixon		279	272	+2.57%
274	Blue Springs	City	Gage		278	282	−1.42%
275	Palisade	Village	Hitchcock	Hayes	277	294	−5.78%
276	Murdock	Village	Cass		276	270	+2.22%
277	Lawrence	Village	Nuckolls		275	272	+1.10%
278	Maywood	Village	Frontier		275	262	+4.96%
279	Dannebrog	Village	Howard		273	273	0.00%
280	Hoskins	Village	Wayne		273	263	+3.80%
281	Glenvil	Village	Clay		269	260	+3.46%
282	Oakdale	Village	Antelope		268	276	−2.90%
283	Diller	Village	Jefferson		267	247	+8.10%
284	Meadow Grove	Village	Madison		267	287	−6.97%
285	Chapman	Village	Merrick		265	260	+1.92%
286	Clatonia	Village	Gage		260	263	−1.14%
287	North Loup	Village	Valley		260	254	+2.36%
288	Campbell	Village	Franklin		258	272	−5.15%
289	Odell	Village	Gage		258	260	−0.77%
290	Roseland	Village	Adams		258	263	−1.90%
291	Butte	Village	Boyd		257	286	−10.14%
292	Bartley	Village	Red Willow		256	270	−5.19%
293	Stapleton	Village	Logan		252	267	−5.62%
294	Weston	Village	Saunders		250	250	0.00%
295	Lyman	Village	Scotts Bluff		249	259	−3.86%
296	Maxwell	Village	Lincoln		248	257	−3.50%
297	Harrison	Village	Sioux		247	239	+3.35%
298	Milligan	Village	Fillmore		244	244	0.00%
299	Snyder	Village	Dodge		244	254	−3.94%
300	Sumner	Village	Dawson		244	252	−3.17%
301	Riverdale	Village	Buffalo		243	247	−1.62%
302	Springview	Village	Keya Paha		241	238	+1.26%
303	Madrid	Village	Perkins		238	242	−1.65%
304	Marquette	Village	Hamilton		237	236	+0.42%
305	Wolbach	Village	Greeley		237	224	+5.80%
306	Dwight	Village	Butler		235	229	+2.62%
307	Table Rock	Village	Pawnee		234	233	+0.43%
308	Panama	Village	Lancaster		230	235	−2.13%
309	Pilger	Village	Stanton		230	240	−4.17%
310	Staplehurst	Village	Seward		229	236	−2.97%
311	Western	Village	Saline		229	227	+0.88%
312	Jackson	Village	Dakota		227	207	+9.66%
313	Uehling	Village	Dodge		227	241	−5.81%
314	Gresham	Village	York		225	219	+2.74%
315	Wynot	Village	Cedar		221	216	+2.31%
316	Hayes Center	Village	Hayes		218	224	−2.68%
317	Herman	Village	Washington		217	247	−12.15%
318	Pleasant Dale	Village	Seward		214	218	−1.83%
319	Litchfield	Village	Sherman		213	220	−3.18%
320	Roca	Village	Lancaster		213	201	+5.97%
321	Chester	Village	Thayer		212	224	−5.36%
322	Garland	Village	Seward		210	210	0.00%
323	Talmage	Village	Otoe		206	198	+4.04%
324	Benedict	Village	York		205	203	+0.99%
325	Amherst	Village	Buffalo		204	201	+1.49%
326	Bladen	Village	Webster		201	205	−1.95%
327	Ashton	Village	Sherman		200	198	+1.01%
328	Craig	Village	Burt		200	202	−0.99%
329	Thedford	Village	Thomas		200	208	−3.85%
330	Trumbull	Village	Clay		200	194	+3.09%
331	Union	Village	Cass		200	195	+2.56%
332	Elba	Village	Howard		199	192	+3.65%
333	Guide Rock	Village	Webster		199	199	0.00%
334	Holbrook	Village	Furnas		197	201	−1.99%
335	Dix	Village	Kimball		195	187	+4.28%
336	Gurley	Village	Cheyenne		190	187	+1.60%
337	Ulysses	Village	Butler		190	196	−3.06%
338	Pickrell	Village	Gage		189	186	+1.61%
339	Denton	Village	Lancaster		188	189	−0.53%
340	Avoca	Village	Cass		187	178	+5.06%
341	Lynch	Village	Boyd		183	194	−5.67%
342	Holstein	Village	Adams		182	191	−4.71%
343	Carroll	Village	Wayne		181	191	−5.24%
344	Douglas	Village	Otoe		179	166	+7.83%
345	Farnam	Village	Dawson		178	182	−2.20%
346	Nehawka	Village	Cass		178	173	+2.89%
347	Goehner	Village	Seward		177	181	−2.21%
348	Howard City	Village	Howard		175	181	−3.31%
349	Creston	Village	Platte		174	181	−3.87%
350	Manley	Village	Cass		174	167	+4.19%
351	Cody	Village	Cherry		171	168	+1.79%
352	Funk	Village	Phelps		171	175	−2.29%
353	Hubbard	Village	Dakota		170	153	+11.11%
354	Dunbar	Village	Otoe		169	165	+2.42%
355	Otoe	Village	Otoe		169	161	+4.97%
356	Bee	Village	Seward		168	171	−1.75%
357	Lewellen	Village	Garden		168	175	−4.00%
358	Page	Village	Holt		165	166	−0.60%
359	Brunswick	Village	Antelope		159	152	+4.61%
360	Ithaca	Village	Saunders		156	160	−2.50%
361	Rosalie	Village	Thurston		156	159	−1.89%
362	Verdon	Village	Richardson		156	164	−4.88%
363	Daykin	Village	Jefferson		153	153	0.00%
364	Raymond	Village	Lancaster		153	159	−3.77%
365	Stamford	Village	Harlan		153	158	−3.16%
366	Shubert	Village	Richardson		152	163	−6.75%
367	Venango	Village	Perkins		151	157	−3.82%
368	Mason City	Village	Custer		149	151	−1.32%
369	Hyannis	Village	Grant		148	165	−10.30%
370	Rulo	Village	Richardson		145	145	0.00%
371	Brownville	Village	Nemaha		141	139	+1.44%
372	Oconto	Village	Custer		141	138	+2.17%
373	Alexandria	Village	Thayer		140	148	−5.41%
374	Stella	Village	Richardson		140	145	−3.45%
375	Haigler	Village	Dundy		139	145	−4.14%
376	Republican City	Village	Harlan		138	134	+2.99%
377	Dawson	Village	Richardson		137	148	−7.43%
378	Hordville	Village	Hamilton		137	131	+4.58%
379	Sprague	Village	Lancaster		134	136	−1.47%
380	Taylor	Village	Loup		132	141	−6.38%
381	Fordyce	Village	Cedar		131	134	−2.24%
382	Henry	Village	Scotts Bluff		131	125	+4.80%
383	Washington	Village	Washington		131	129	+1.55%
384	Farwell	Village	Howard		130	138	−5.80%
385	Miller	Village	Buffalo		129	129	0.00%
386	Alvo	Village	Cass		125	115	+8.70%
387	Concord	Village	Dixon		125	126	−0.79%
388	Davey	Village	Lancaster		124	135	−8.15%
389	Morse Bluff	Village	Saunders		124	117	+5.98%
390	Ohiowa	Village	Fillmore		122	120	+1.67%
391	Du Bois	Village	Pawnee		121	122	−0.82%
392	Filley	Village	Gage		121	124	−2.42%
393	Upland	Village	Franklin		121	125	−3.20%
394	Brock	Village	Nemaha		120	123	−2.44%
395	Colon	Village	Saunders		120	107	+12.15%
396	Arthur	Village	Arthur		119	128	−7.03%
397	Thurston	Village	Thurston		118	116	+1.72%
398	Tobias	Village	Saline		115	114	+0.88%
399	Leshara	Village	Saunders		114	108	+5.56%
400	Nemaha	Village	Nemaha		112	114	−1.75%
401	Belden	Village	Cedar		111	113	−1.77%
402	Endicott	Village	Jefferson		110	113	−2.65%
403	Edison	Village	Furnas		109	111	−1.80%
404	Belgrade	Village	Nance		108	103	+4.85%
405	Bloomington	Village	Franklin		108	110	−1.82%
406	Bushnell	Village	Kimball		108	115	−6.09%
407	Grafton	Village	Fillmore		108	106	+1.89%
408	Melbeta	Village	Scotts Bluff		108	108	0.00%
409	Ruskin	Village	Nuckolls		108	105	+2.86%
410	Bartlett	Village	Wheeler		107	109	−1.83%
411	Octavia	Village	Butler		107	107	0.00%
412	Anselmo	Village	Custer		106	108	−1.85%
413	Memphis	Village	Saunders		106	109	−2.75%
414	Atlanta	Village	Phelps		102	106	−3.77%
415	Elsie	Village	Perkins		102	102	0.00%
416	Jansen	Village	Jefferson		101	101	0.00%
417	Cordova	Village	Seward		100	92	+8.70%
418	Inman	Village	Holt		99	95	+4.21%
419	Broadwater	Village	Morrill		97	95	+2.11%
420	Bruno	Village	Butler		95	95	0.00%
421	South Bend	Village	Cass		94	92	+2.17%
422	Linwood	Village	Butler		93	94	−1.06%
423	Malmo	Village	Saunders		93	94	−1.06%
424	Hardy	Village	Nuckolls		92	97	−5.15%
425	Merriman	Village	Cherry		91	87	+4.60%
426	Carleton	Village	Thayer		90	92	−2.17%
427	Ericson	Village	Wheeler		90	89	+1.12%
428	Barneston	Village	Gage		88	90	−2.22%
429	Rockville	Village	Sherman		88	89	−1.12%
430	St. Helena	Village	Cedar		87	89	−2.25%
431	Byron	Village	Thayer		86	83	+3.61%
432	Dunning	Village	Blaine		85	80	+6.25%
433	Ayr	Village	Adams		84	83	+1.20%
434	Eddyville	Village	Dawson		84	88	−4.55%
435	Naponee	Village	Franklin		84	83	+1.20%
436	Rogers	Village	Colfax		84	82	+2.44%
437	Richland	Village	Colfax		83	70	+18.57%
438	Heartwell	Village	Kearney		82	81	+1.23%
439	Naper	Village	Boyd		82	89	−7.87%
440	Martinsburg	Village	Dixon		81	78	+3.85%
441	Salem	Village	Richardson		80	83	−3.61%
442	Prosser	Village	Adams		78	76	+2.63%
443	Swanton	Village	Saline		78	82	−4.88%
444	Dixon	Village	Dixon		77	77	0.00%
445	Burchard	Village	Pawnee		75	76	−1.32%
446	Crookston	Village	Cherry		75	71	+5.63%
447	Berwyn	Village	Custer		73	75	−2.67%
448	Comstock	Village	Custer		73	68	+7.35%
449	Wilsonville	Village	Furnas		73	75	−2.67%
450	Danbury	Village	Red Willow		72	80	−10.00%
451	Waterbury	Village	Dixon		72	72	0.00%
452	Wellfleet	Village	Lincoln		72	72	0.00%
453	Center	Village	Knox		71	79	−10.13%
454	Virginia	Village	Gage		71	74	−4.05%
455	Bristow	Village	Boyd		69	70	−1.43%
456	Newport	Village	Rock		69	68	+1.47%
457	Kilgore	Village	Cherry		68	63	+7.94%
458	McGrew	Village	Scotts Bluff		68	75	−9.33%
459	Abie	Village	Butler		67	65	+3.08%
460	Elk Creek	Village	Johnson		67	69	−2.90%
461	Hubbell	Village	Thayer		66	63	+4.76%
462	Halsey	Village	Thomas	Blaine	62	68	−8.82%
463	Reynolds	Village	Jefferson		62	57	+8.77%
464	Lewiston	Village	Pawnee		60	55	+9.09%
465	Hazard	Village	Sherman		59	57	+3.51%
466	Smithfield	Village	Gosper		59	60	−1.67%
467	Maskell	Village	Dixon		58	58	0.00%
468	Primrose	Village	Boone		57	55	+3.64%
469	Riverton	Village	Franklin		57	57	0.00%
470	Steinauer	Village	Pawnee		57	59	−3.39%
471	Whitney	Village	Dawes		57	62	−8.06%
472	Garrison	Village	Butler		56	55	+1.82%
473	Burr	Village	Otoe		55	52	+5.77%
474	Royal	Village	Antelope		55	58	−5.17%
475	Belvidere	Village	Thayer		54	51	+5.88%
476	Winnetoon	Village	Knox		53	54	−1.85%
477	Harbine	Village	Jefferson		52	56	−7.14%
478	Thayer	Village	York		52	44	+18.18%
479	Steele City	Village	Jefferson		51	44	+15.91%
480	Elyria	Village	Valley		50	50	0.00%
481	Oak	Village	Nuckolls		50	54	−7.41%
482	Wood Lake	Village	Cherry		50	46	+8.70%
483	Ong	Village	Clay		49	49	0.00%
484	Tarnov	Village	Platte		47	52	−9.62%
485	Foster	Village	Pierce		46	42	+9.52%
486	Julian	Village	Nemaha		46	46	0.00%
487	Lebanon	Village	Red Willow		46	46	0.00%
488	Magnet	Village	Cedar		46	43	+6.98%
489	Crab Orchard	Village	Johnson		45	46	−2.17%
490	Emmet	Village	Holt		45	46	−2.17%
491	Johnstown	Village	Brown		44	47	−6.38%
492	Deweese	Village	Clay		43	42	+2.38%
493	Verdel	Village	Knox		41	38	+7.89%
494	Surprise	Village	Butler		40	37	+8.11%
495	Clinton	Village	Sheridan		38	38	0.00%
496	Lorton	Village	Otoe		38	35	+8.57%
497	McLean	Village	Pierce		38	33	+15.15%
498	Saronville	Village	Clay		37	35	+5.71%
499	Cushing	Village	Howard		36	37	−2.70%
500	Norman	Village	Kearney		35	32	+9.38%
501	Cornlea	Village	Platte		34	33	+3.03%
502	Stockham	Village	Hamilton		34	32	+6.25%
503	Strang	Village	Fillmore		33	30	+10.00%
504	Huntley	Village	Harlan		32	33	−3.03%
505	Liberty	Village	Gage		32	37	−13.51%
506	Cotesfield	Village	Howard		31	29	+6.90%
507	Gilead	Village	Thayer		30	30	0.00%
508	Gandy	Village	Logan		29	34	−14.71%
509	Lushton	Village	York		27	28	−3.57%
510	Moorefield	Village	Frontier		27	27	0.00%
511	Hamlet	Village	Hayes		26	27	−3.70%
512	Lamar	Village	Chase		24	28	−14.29%
513	Stockville	Village	Frontier		23	25	−8.00%
514	Hendley	Village	Furnas		22	20	+10.00%
515	Obert	Village	Cedar		22	22	0.00%
516	Bazile Mills	Village	Knox		21	26	−19.23%
517	Cowles	Village	Webster		21	21	0.00%
518	Nora	Village	Nuckolls		21	21	0.00%
519	Ragan	Village	Harlan		21	22	−4.55%
520	Winslow	Village	Dodge		20	19	+5.26%
521	Barada	Village	Richardson		19	21	−9.52%
522	Nenzel	Village	Cherry		18	17	+5.88%
523	Sholes	Village	Wayne		17	16	+6.25%
524	Burton	Village	Keya Paha		11	11	0.00%
525	Anoka	Village	Boyd		9	10	−10.00%
526	Brewster	Village	Blaine		9	12	−25.00%
527	Gross	Village	Boyd		3	3	0.00%
528	Monowi	Village	Boyd		1	2	−50.00%
Total of 528 municipalities			93 Counties		2,018,006	1,961,504	2.88%

== See also ==
- List of census-designated places in Nebraska

== Images ==
Notable incorporated cities in Nebraska

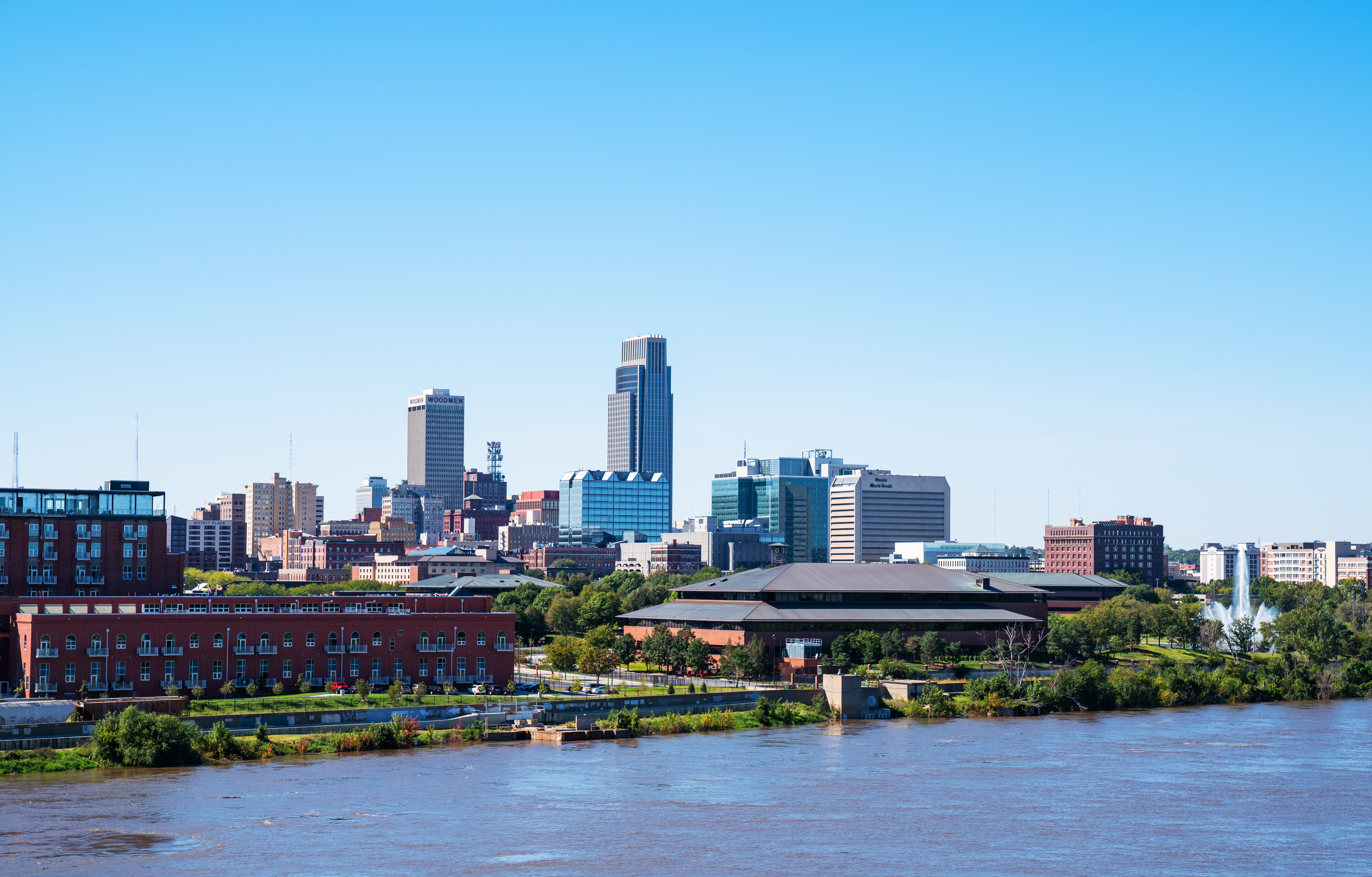
Omaha, the largest city in Nebraska

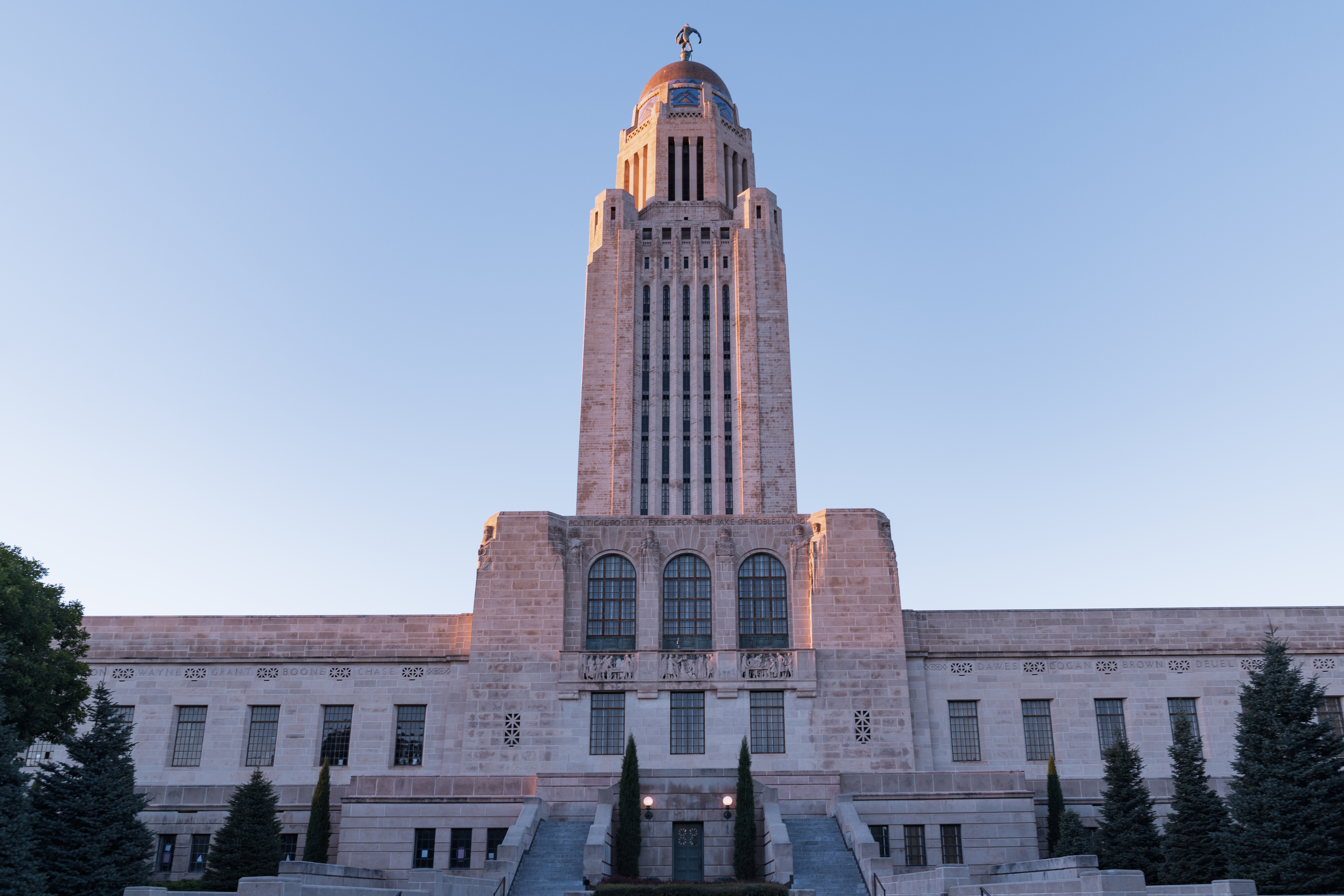
Lincoln, state capital and second-largest city

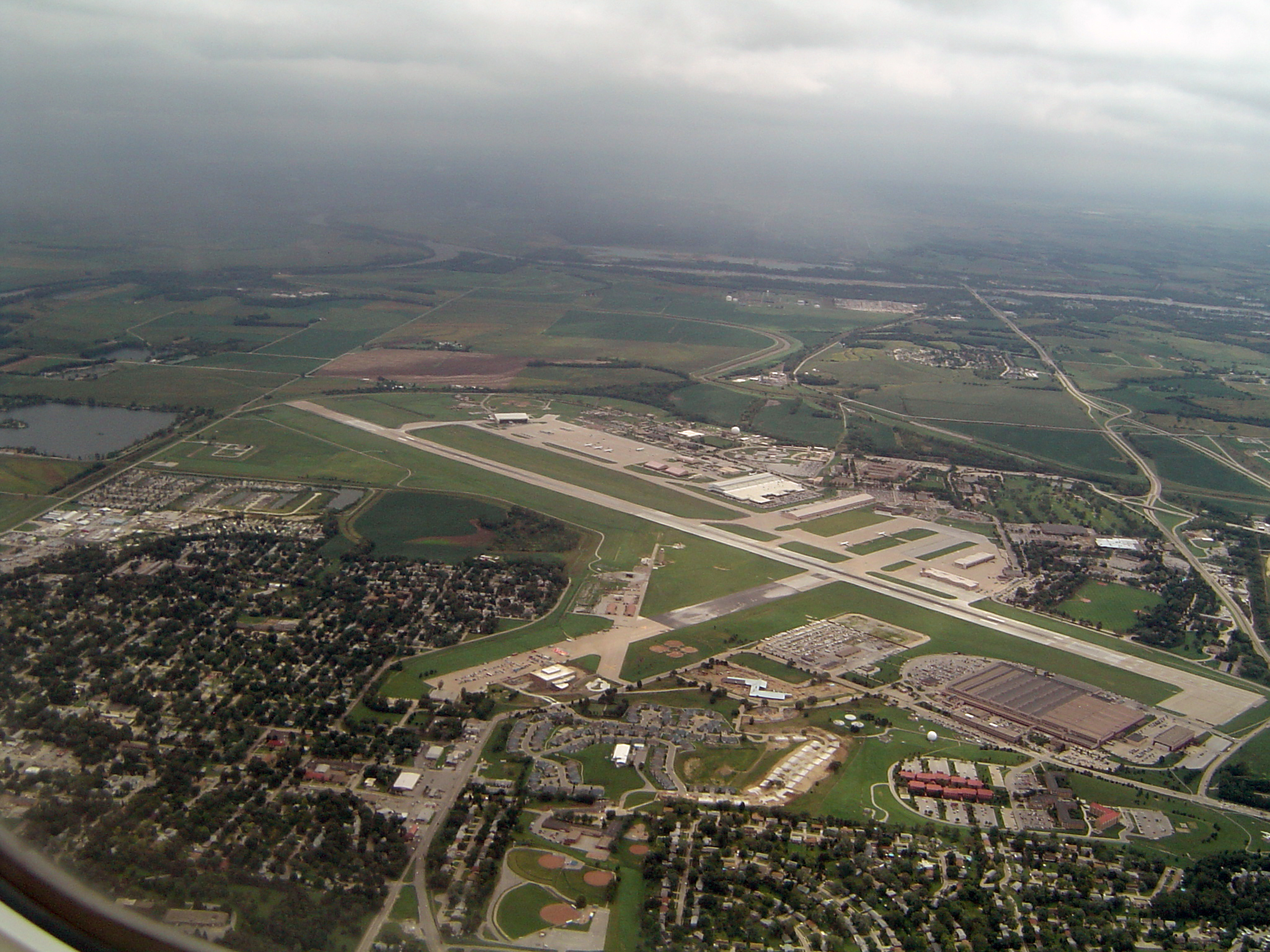
Bellevue, third-largest city

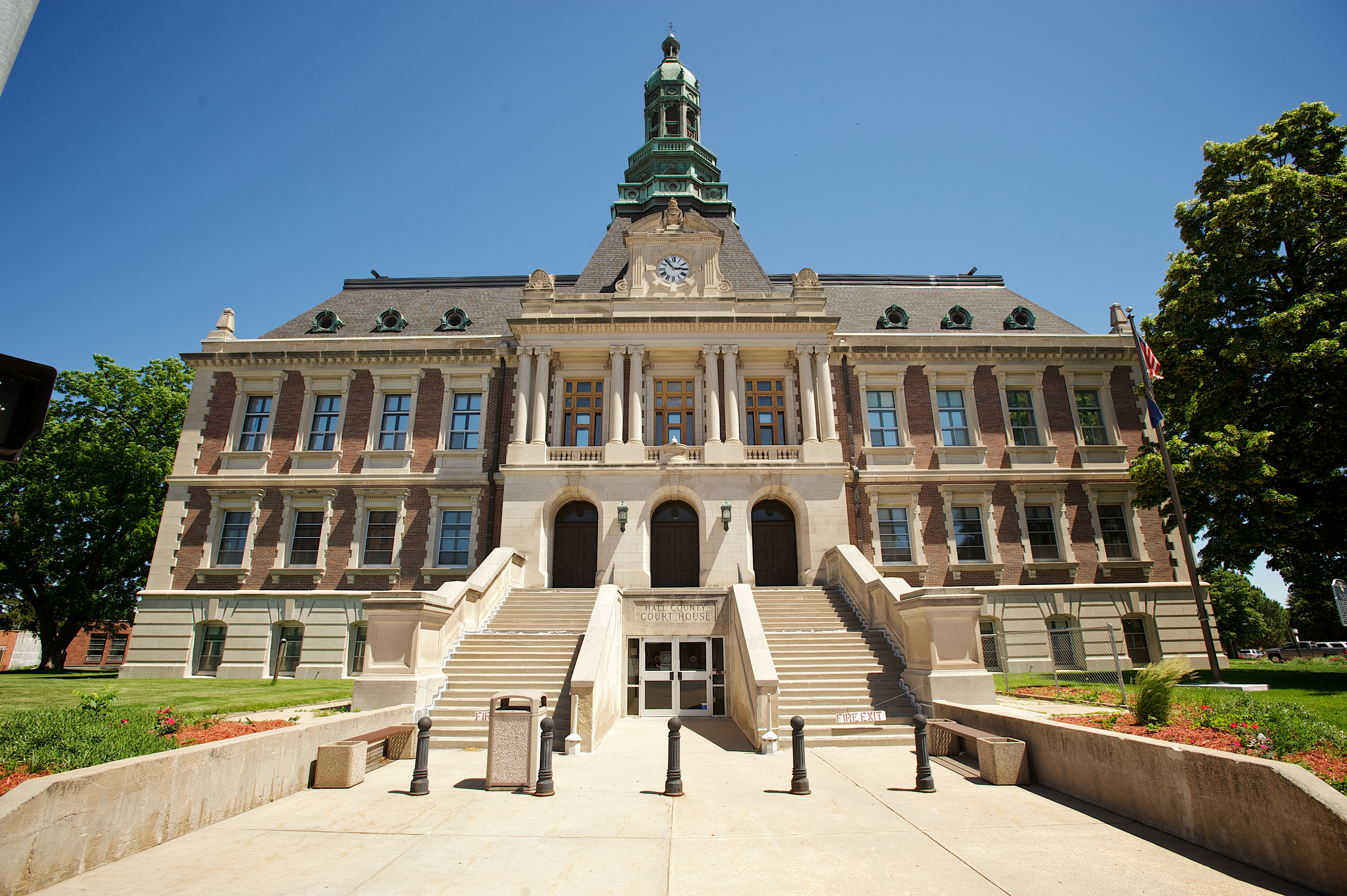
Grand Island, fourth-largest city

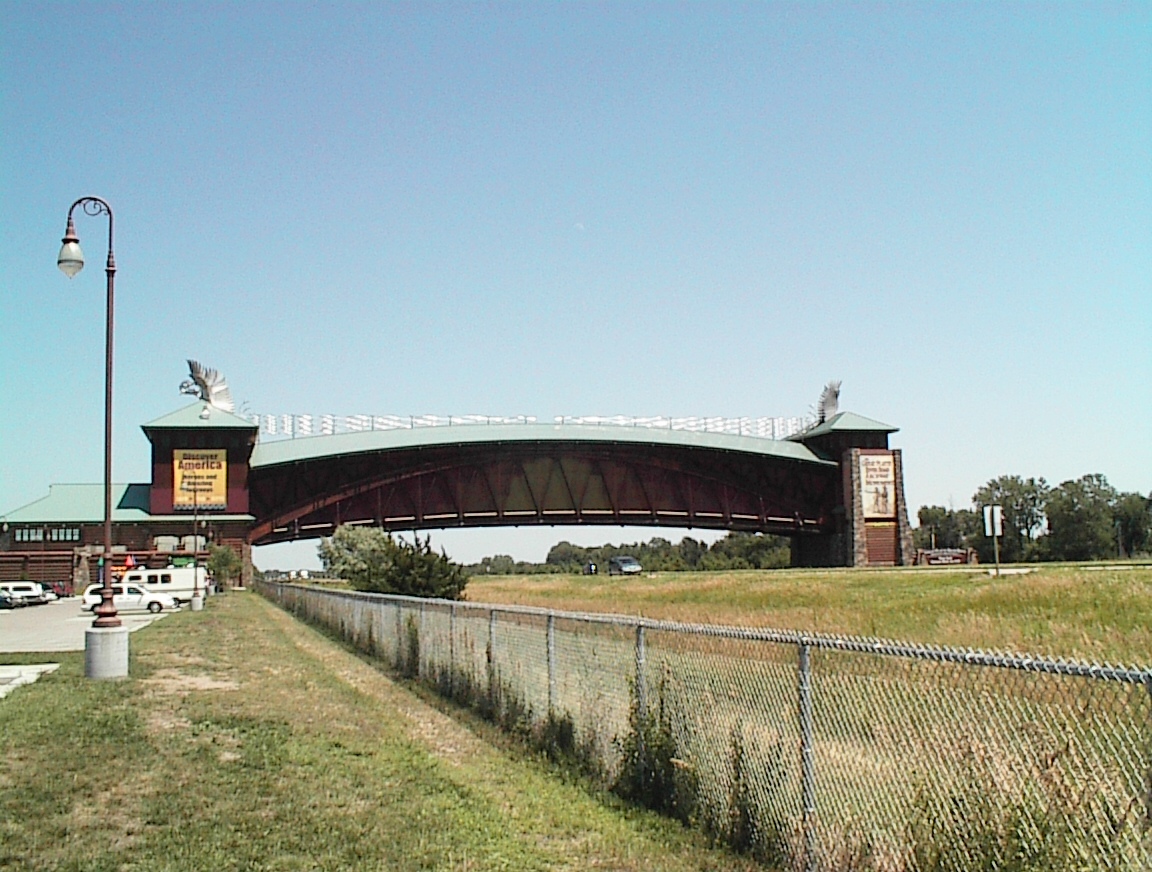
Kearney, fifth-largest city
