= Lime Grove, Nebraska =

Unincorporated community in Nebraska, United States

Lime Grove Limegrove
- Unincorporated Community
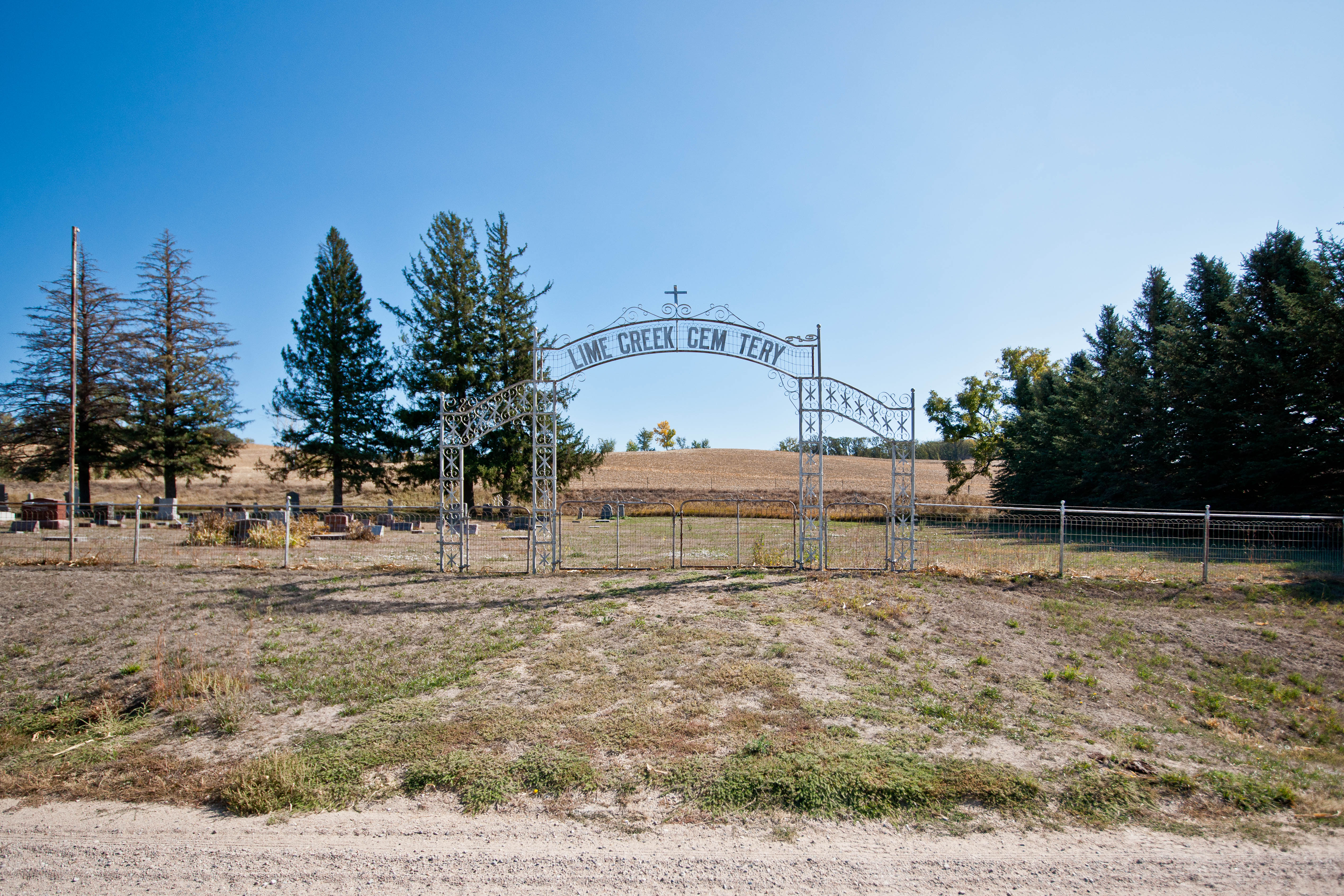
- Lime Grove Cemetery, September 2012

- Location within Nebraska Location within the United States
- Coordinates: 42°39′49″N 96°59′58″W
- Country: United States
- State: Nebraska
- County: Dixon
- Elevation: 1,293 ft (394 m)
- GNIS feature ID: 835363

Lime Grove is an unincorporated community in Dixon County, Nebraska, United States.

== History ==
Lime Grove (also historically Limegrove) was named from Lime Creek, which runs through it. A post office was established as Limegrove in 1883, and remained in operation until it was discontinued in 1902.
