= Waterbury, Nebraska =

Village in Dixon County, Nebraska, United States

- Village
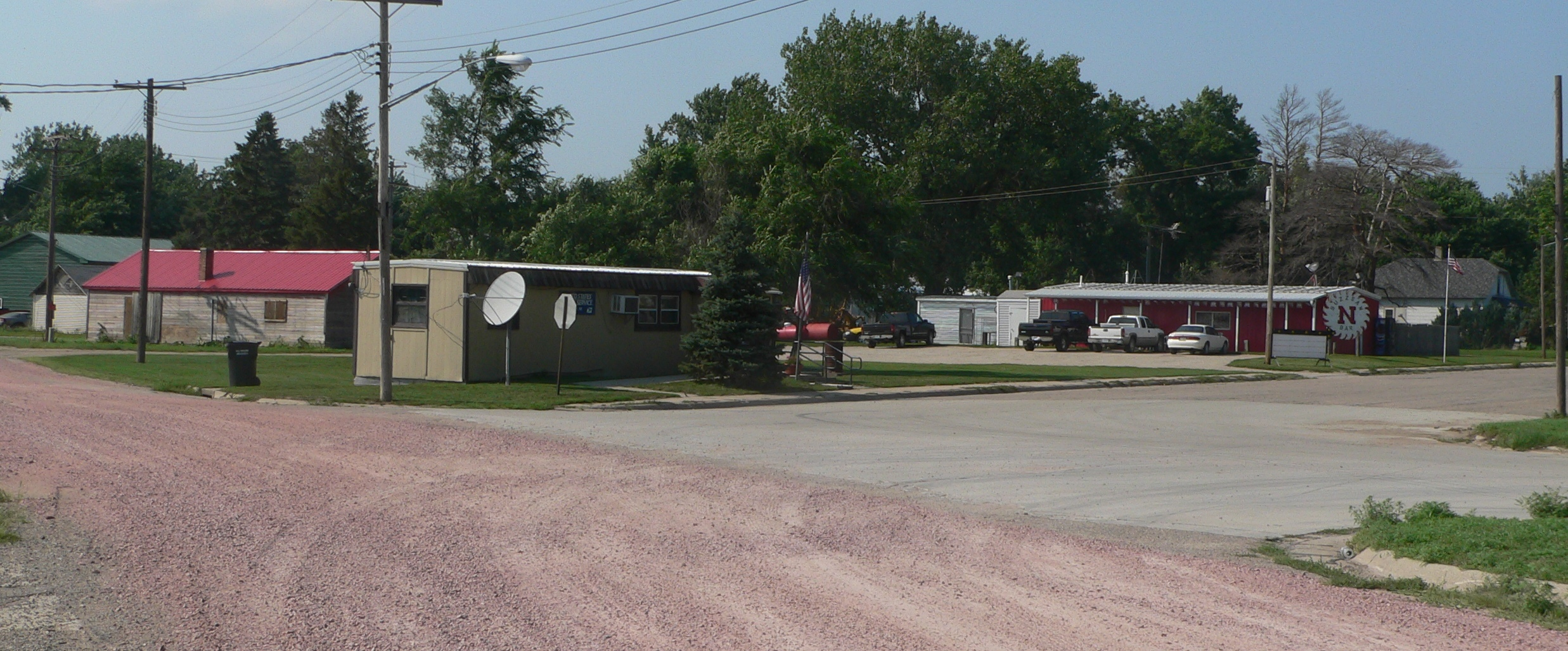
- Downtown Waterbury, August 2013

- Location of Waterbury, Nebraska
- Coordinates: 42°27′26″N 96°44′08″W
- Country: United States
- State: Nebraska
- County: Dixon

Area
  - Total: 0.14 sq mi (0.36 km^{2})
  - Land: 0.14 sq mi (0.36 km^{2})
  - Water: 0 sq mi (0.00 km^{2})
- Elevation: 1,289 ft (393 m)

Population (2020)
  - Total: 72
  - Density: 519.9/sq mi (200.73/km^{2})
- Time zone: UTC-6 (Central (CST))
  - Summer (DST): UTC-5 (CDT)
- ZIP code: 68785
- Area code: 402
- FIPS code: 31-51630
- GNIS feature ID: 2400102

Waterbury is a village in Dixon County, Nebraska, United States. It is part of the Sioux City, IA–NE–SD Metropolitan Statistical Area. As of the 2020 census, Waterbury had a population of 72.

== History ==
Waterbury was established in 1890 when the railroad was extended to that point. Waterbury derives its name from a spring which once provided water for water station.

== Geography ==
According to the United States Census Bureau, the village has a total area of 0.14 square miles (0.36 km^{2}), all land.

== Demographics ==
Historical population
Census	Pop.	Note	%±
1910	199		—
1920	190		−4.5%
1930	204		7.4%
1940	164		−19.6%
1950	141		−14.0%
1960	81		−42.6%
1970	81		0.0%
1980	92		13.6%
1990	95		3.3%
2000	89		−6.3%
2010	73		−18.0%
2020	72		−1.4%
U.S. Decennial Census

=== 2010 census ===
As of the census of 2010, there were 73 people, 29 households, and 21 families living in the village. The population density was 521.4 inhabitants per square mile (201.3/km^{2}). There were 47 housing units at an average density of 335.7 per square mile (129.6/km^{2}). The racial makeup of the village was 100.0% White. Hispanic or Latino of any race were 1.4% of the population.

There were 29 households, of which 34.5% had children under the age of 18 living with them, 58.6% were married couples living together, 3.4% had a female householder with no husband present, 10.3% had a male householder with no wife present, and 27.6% were non-families. 24.1% of all households were made up of individuals, and 6.8% had someone living alone who was 65 years of age or older. The average household size was 2.52 and the average family size was 2.86.

The median age in the village was 44.5 years. 21.9% of residents were under the age of 18; 6.9% were between the ages of 18 and 24; 21.9% were from 25 to 44; 35.5% were from 45 to 64; and 13.7% were 65 years of age or older. The gender makeup of the village was 56.2% male and 43.8% female.

=== 2000 census ===
As of the census of 2000, there were 89 people, 34 households, and 21 families living in the village. The population density was 645.9 inhabitants per square mile (249.4/km^{2}). There were 46 housing units at an average density of 333.8 per square mile (128.9/km^{2}). The racial makeup of the village was 100.00% White.

There were 34 households, out of which 35.3% had children under the age of 18 living with them, 41.2% were married couples living together, 14.7% had a female householder with no husband present, and 35.3% were non-families. 29.4% of all households were made up of individuals, and 11.8% had someone living alone who was 65 years of age or older. The average household size was 2.62 and the average family size was 3.36.

In the village, the population was spread out, with 32.6% under the age of 18, 2.2% from 18 to 24, 37.1% from 25 to 44, 18.0% from 45 to 64, and 10.1% who were 65 years of age or older. The median age was 32 years. For every 100 females, there were 122.5 males. For every 100 females age 18 and over, there were 106.9 males.

As of 2000 the median income for a household in the village was $23,438, and the median income for a family was $41,458. Males had a median income of $25,938 versus $23,906 for females. The per capita income for the village was $14,764. There were 13.3% of families and 19.8% of the population living below the poverty line, including 22.2% of under eighteens and 28.6% of those over 64.

== See also ==
- List of municipalities in Nebraska
