= Jackson, Nebraska =

- Village
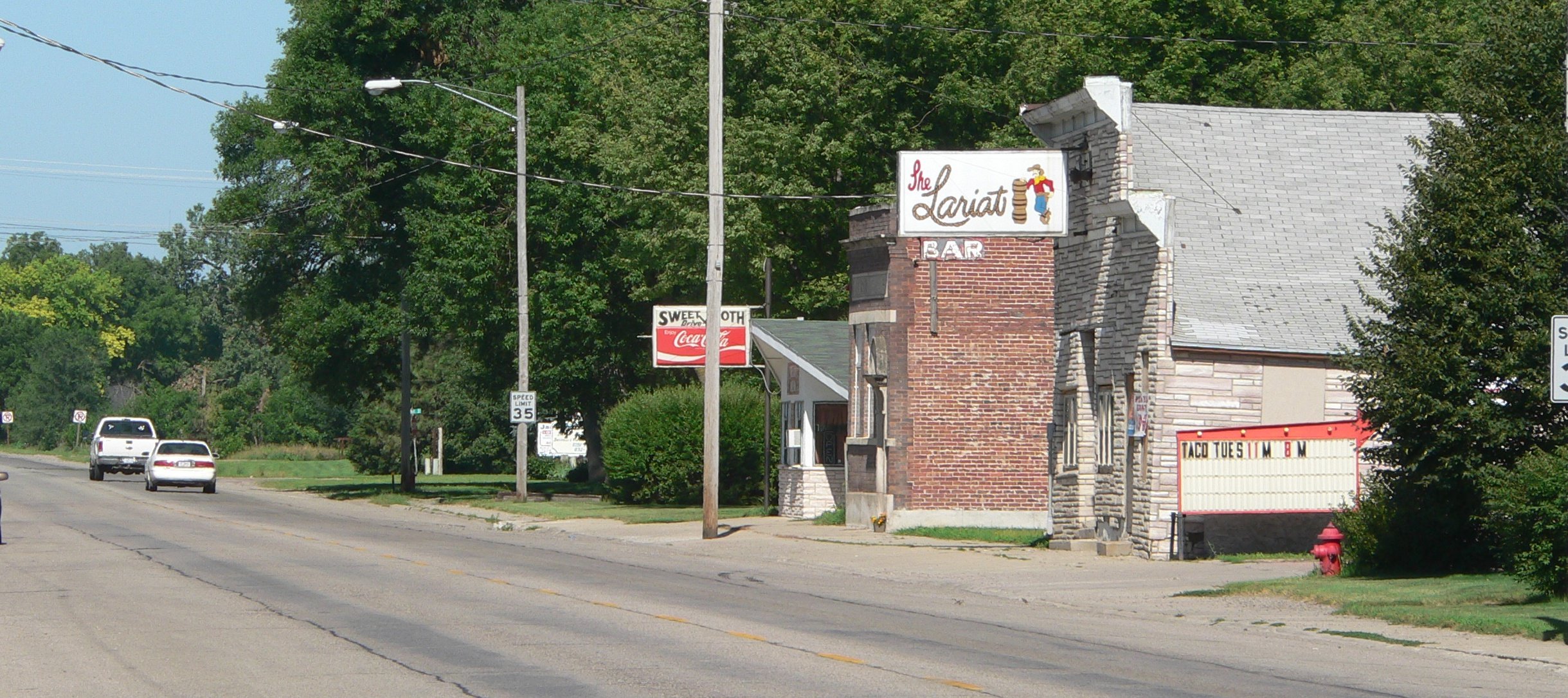
- Downtown Jackson, Nebraska: looking northwest on U.S. Route 20, July 2010
- Nickname: "West Sioux City"
- Location of Jackson, Nebraska
- Coordinates: 42°26′51″N 96°34′17″W
- Country: United States
- State: Nebraska
- County: Dakota

Area
  - Total: 0.45 sq mi (1.17 km^{2})
  - Land: 0.45 sq mi (1.17 km^{2})
  - Water: 0 sq mi (0.00 km^{2})
- Elevation: 1,122 ft (342 m)

Population (2020)
  - Total: 207
  - Density: 459.6/sq mi (177.45/km^{2})
- Time zone: UTC-6 (Central (CST))
  - Summer (DST): UTC-5 (CDT)
- ZIP code: 68743
- Area code: 402
- FIPS code: 31-24355
- GNIS feature ID: 2398285

Jackson is a village in Dakota County, Nebraska, United States. It is part of the Sioux City, IA–NE–SD Metropolitan Statistical Area. As of the 2020 census, Jackson had a population of 207.

== History ==
Prior to the establishment of Jackson, the townsite of Old St. John's was settled approximately 1.5 miles north of the current site of Jackson on June 2, 1856, by a Catholic colony of sixty Irish immigrants led by Father Trecy. The colony was one of the first towns settled in Dakota County, and the first Catholic parish in Nebraska. When the rising Missouri River began to threaten the town around 1860, all of the residents of Old St. John's moved south to what is now known as Jackson.

Jackson was originally called Franklin, and under the latter name was laid out in about 1860. When it was discovered there was another post office in the state with the name Franklin, the community was renamed in honor of Andrew Jackson in order to avoid repetition.

== Geography ==
According to the United States Census Bureau, the village has a total area of 0.45 square miles (1.17 km^{2}), all land.

== Demographics ==
Historical population
Census	Pop.	Note	%±
1890	308		—
1900	339		10.1%
1910	290		−14.5%
1920	274		−5.5%
1930	242		−11.7%
1940	226		−6.6%
1950	200		−11.5%
1960	224		12.0%
1970	232		3.6%
1980	287		23.7%
1990	230		−19.9%
2000	205		−10.9%
2010	223		8.8%
2020	207		−7.2%
U.S. Decennial Census

=== 2010 census ===
As of the census of 2010, there were 223 people, 85 households, and 62 families residing in the village. The population density was 495.6 inhabitants per square mile (191.4/km^{2}). There were 90 housing units at an average density of 200.0 per square mile (77.2/km^{2}). The racial makeup of the village was 87.9% White, 0.9% Native American, 2.2% Asian, 3.1% Pacific Islander, 3.1% from other races, and 2.7% from two or more races. Hispanic or Latino of any race were 5.4% of the population.

There were 85 households, of which 35.3% had children under the age of 18 living with them, 51.8% were married couples living together, 14.1% had a female householder with no husband present, 7.1% had a male householder with no wife present, and 27.1% were non-families. 24.7% of all households were made up of individuals, and 7.1% had someone living alone who was 65 years of age or older. The average household size was 2.62 and the average family size was 3.10.

The median age in the village was 36.6 years. 28.3% of residents were under the age of 18; 6.7% were between the ages of 18 and 24; 24.2% were from 25 to 44; 25.1% were from 45 to 64; and 15.7% were 65 years of age or older. The gender makeup of the village was 48.4% male and 51.6% female.

=== 2000 census ===
As of the census of 2000, there were 205 people, 83 households, and 57 families residing in the village. The population density was 1,175.0 inhabitants per square mile (453.7/km^{2}). There were 90 housing units at an average density of 515.9 per square mile (199.2/km^{2}). The racial makeup of the village was 99.02% White, 0.49% Native American and 0.49% Asian.

There were 83 households, out of which 32.5% had children under the age of 18 living with them, 54.2% were married couples living together, 10.8% had a female householder with no husband present, and 31.3% were non-families. 30.1% of all households were made up of individuals, and 15.7% had someone living alone who was 65 years of age or older. The average household size was 2.47 and the average family size was 3.09.

In the village, the population was spread out, with 26.8% under the age of 18, 7.3% from 18 to 24, 26.8% from 25 to 44, 24.4% from 45 to 64, and 14.6% who were 65 years of age or older. The median age was 38 years. For every 100 females, there were 101.0 males. For every 100 females age 18 and over, there were 100.0 males.

As of 2000 the median income for a household in the village was $50,833, and the median income for a family was $59,063. Males had a median income of $31,500 versus $22,917 for females. The per capita income for the village was $20,771. About 3.2% of families and 1.9% of the population were below the poverty line, including none of those under the age of eighteen and 13.3% of those 65 or over.

== See also ==
- List of municipalities in Nebraska
