= Ponca, Nebraska =

City in and county seat of Dixon County, Nebraska, U.S.

- City
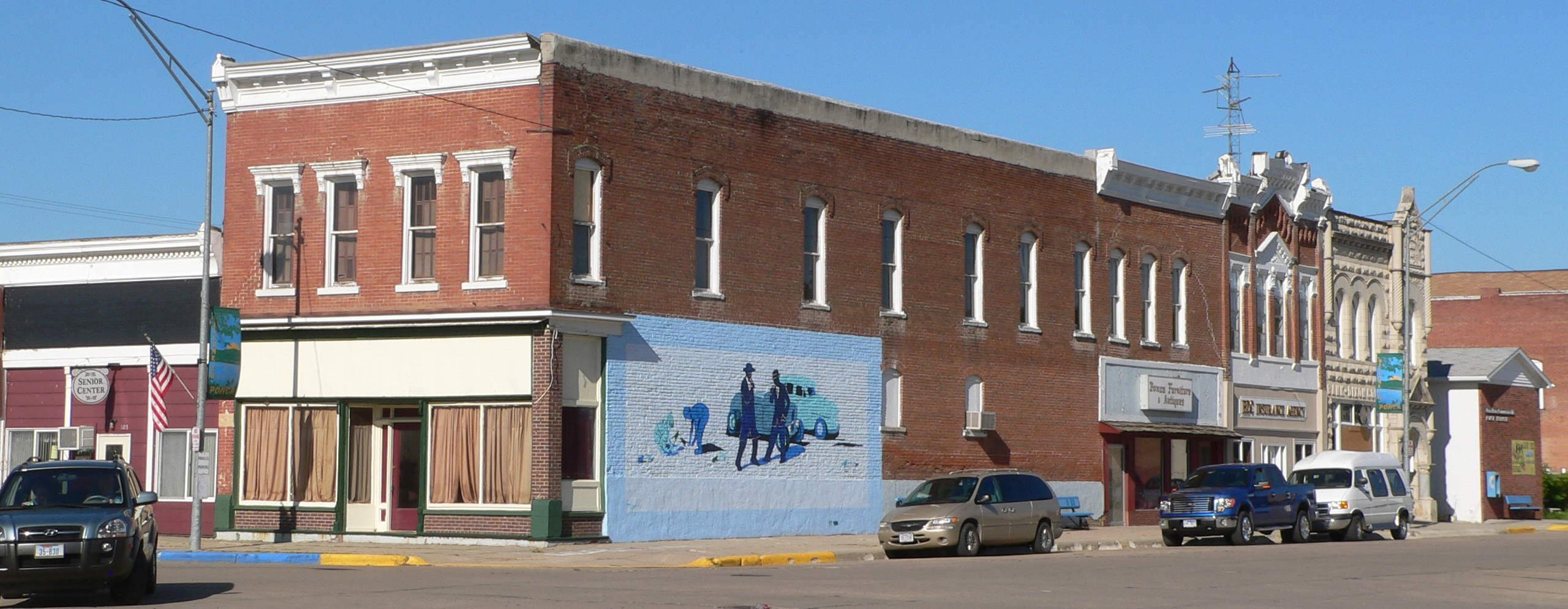
- The downtown Ponca Historic District is listed in the National Register of Historic Places.
- Motto: "A Great Place To Visit, A Better Place To Live"
- Location within Dixon County (left) and Nebraska (right)
- Coordinates: 42°33′54″N 96°42′33″W
- Country: United States
- State: Nebraska
- County: Dixon
- Established: 1856
- Incorporated: 1871

Area
  - Total: 0.77 sq mi (2.00 km^{2})
  - Land: 0.77 sq mi (2.00 km^{2})
  - Water: 0 sq mi (0.00 km^{2})
- Elevation: 1,201 ft (366 m)

Population (2020)
  - Total: 907
  - Density: 1,173.3/sq mi (453.02/km^{2})
- Time zone: UTC-6 (Central (CST))
  - Summer (DST): UTC-5 (CDT)
- ZIP code: 68770
- Area code: 402
- FIPS code: 31-39695
- GNIS feature ID: 838195
- Website: ponca.municipalimpact.com

Ponca is a city in and the county seat of Dixon County, Nebraska, United States. As of the 2020 census, Ponca had a population of 907.

== History ==
Ponca was established in 1856 and is Nebraska's fourth oldest town. It was named for the Ponca Indian tribe native to the region. Ponca was incorporated as a village in 1871.

Ponca experienced growth when the Covington, Columbus and Black Hills Railroad was extended to it in 1876.

Ponca also hosts one of the oldest rodeos in Nebraska, called the “Days of ‘56” to honor the founding members of the community. The rodeo is held at the town's rodeo grounds during the last full weekend in June. The 2018 rodeo marked the 50th anniversary of the event.

== Geography ==
According to the United States Census Bureau, the city has a total area of 0.73 square miles (1.89 km^{2}), all land.

== Demographics ==
Historical population
Census	Pop.	Note	%±
1880	594		—
1890	1,009		69.9%
1900	1,043		3.4%
1910	1,000		−4.1%
1920	1,014		1.4%
1930	920		−9.3%
1940	1,003		9.0%
1950	893		−11.0%
1960	924		3.5%
1970	984		6.5%
1980	1,057		7.4%
1990	877		−17.0%
2000	1,062		21.1%
2010	961		−9.5%
2020	907		−5.6%
U.S. Decennial Census

Ponca is part of the Sioux City, IA–NE–SD Metropolitan Statistical Area.

=== 2010 census ===
At the 2010 census there were 961 people in 403 households, including 256 families, in the city. The population density was 1,316.4 inhabitants per square mile (508.3/km^{2}). There were 428 housing units at an average density of 586.3 per square mile (226.4/km^{2}). The racial makeup of the city was 97.8% White, 0.4% African American, 0.2% Native American, 0.1% from other races, and 1.5% from two or more races. Hispanic or Latino of any race were 1.8%.

Of the 403 households 30.0% had children under the age of 18 living with them, 51.9% were married couples living together, 8.4% had a female householder with no husband present, 3.2% had a male householder with no wife present, and 36.5% were non-families. 32.8% of households were one person and 19.1% were one person aged 65 or older. The average household size was 2.28 and the average family size was 2.88.

The median age was 43.9 years. 24.3% of residents were under the age of 18; 6.2% were between the ages of 18 and 24; 21% were from 25 to 44; 27.1% were from 45 to 64; and 21.5% were 65 or older. The gender makeup of the city was 49.1% male and 50.9% female.

=== 2000 census ===
At the 2000 census there were 1,062 people in 403 households, including 286 families, in the city. The population density was 1,508.2 inhabitants per square mile (582.3/km^{2}). There were 425 housing units at an average density of 603.5 per square mile (233.0/km^{2}). The racial makeup of the city was 96.89% White, 0.56% Native American, 0.94% from other races, and 1.60% from two or more races. Hispanic or Latino of any race were 2.64%.

Of the 403 households 35.5% had children under the age of 18 living with them, 57.1% were married couples living together, 11.2% had a female householder with no husband present, and 28.8% were non-families. 25.6% of households were one person and 13.4% were one person aged 65 or older. The average household size was 2.51 and the average family size was 3.00.

The age distribution was 26.6% under the age of 18, 7.9% from 18 to 24, 25.1% from 25 to 44, 20.6% from 45 to 64, and 19.8% 65 or older. The median age was 39 years. For every 100 females, there were 92.0 males. For every 100 females age 18 and over, there were 83.5 males.

The median household income was $31,750, and the median family income was $41,250. Males had a median income of $28,472 versus $21,681 for females. The per capita income for the city was $15,782. About 7.0% of families and 8.6% of the population were below the poverty line, including 10.5% of those under age 18 and 12.1% of those age 65 or over.

== Parks and recreation ==
Ponca State Park is two miles north of the city. The park is located on the heavily forested high bluffs and steep hills along the Nebraska banks of the Missouri River. Ponca State Park is the eastern terminus for float trips through the federally designated National Wild and Scenic River.

== Notable people ==
- Tommy Atkins, Baseball player
- Pug Bennett, Baseball player

== See also ==
- List of municipalities in Nebraska
