= Carroll, Nebraska =

Village in Wayne County, Nebraska, United States

- Village
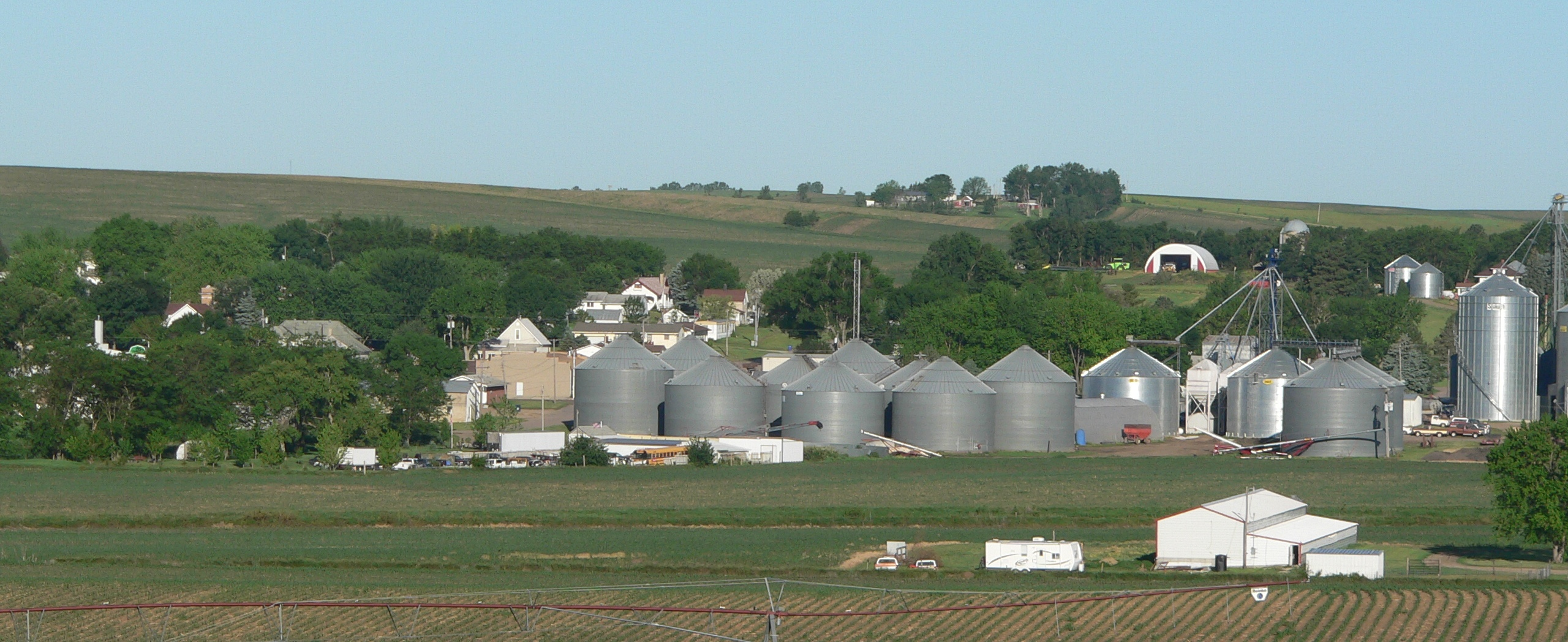
- Grain bins north of downtown Carroll, June 2010

- Location of Carroll, Nebraska
- Coordinates: 42°16′33″N 97°11′27″W
- Country: United States
- State: Nebraska
- County: Wayne

Area
  - Total: 0.15 sq mi (0.39 km^{2})
  - Land: 0.15 sq mi (0.39 km^{2})
  - Water: 0 sq mi (0.00 km^{2})
- Elevation: 1,581 ft (482 m)

Population (2020)
  - Total: 193
  - Estimate (2021): 194
  - Density: 1,300/sq mi (490/km^{2})
- Time zone: UTC-6 (Central (CST))
  - Summer (DST): UTC-5 (CDT)
- ZIP code: 68723
- Area code: 402
- FIPS code: 31-08010
- GNIS feature ID: 2397563

Carroll is a village in Wayne County, Nebraska, United States. The population was 193 at the 2020 census.

== History ==
Carroll was established in 1886 when the railroad was extended to that point. It is named for Charles Carroll of Carrollton, the last surviving signer of the Declaration of Independence.

== Geography ==
According to the United States Census Bureau, the village has a total area of 0.15 square miles (0.39 km^{2}), all land.

== Demographics ==
Historical population
Census	Pop.	Note	%±
1890	68		—
1900	252		270.6%
1910	382		51.6%
1920	448		17.3%
1930	401		−10.5%
1940	351		−12.5%
1950	309		−12.0%
1960	220		−28.8%
1970	235		6.8%
1980	246		4.7%
1990	237		−3.7%
2000	238		0.4%
2010	229		−3.8%
2020	191		−16.6%
U.S. Decennial Census

=== 2010 census ===
As of the census of 2010, there were 229 people, 99 households, and 64 families residing in the village. The population density was 1,526.7 inhabitants per square mile (589.5/km^{2}). There were 112 housing units at an average density of 746.7 per square mile (288.3/km^{2}). The racial makeup of the village was 96.5% White, 0.4% Asian, and 3.1% from other races. Hispanic or Latino of any race were 7.0% of the population.

There were 99 households, of which 31.3% had children under the age of 18 living with them, 55.6% were married couples living together, 5.1% had a female householder with no husband present, 4.0% had a male householder with no wife present, and 35.4% were non-families. 33.3% of all households were made up of individuals, and 20.2% had someone living alone who was 65 years of age or older. The average household size was 2.31 and the average family size was 2.95.

The median age in the village was 43.1 years. 24.9% of residents were under the age of 18; 7% were between the ages of 18 and 24; 20.9% were from 25 to 44; 23.6% were from 45 to 64; and 23.6% were 65 years of age or older. The gender makeup of the village was 52.4% male and 47.6% female.

=== 2000 census ===
As of the census of 2000, there were 238 people, 104 households, and 68 families residing in the village. The population density was 1,592.5 inhabitants per square mile (614.9/km^{2}). There were 116 housing units at an average density of 776.2 per square mile (299.7/km^{2}). The racial makeup of the village was 96.22% White, 1.68% Native American, and 2.10% from two or more races.

There were 104 households, out of which 26.9% had children under the age of 18 living with them, 55.8% were married couples living together, 5.8% had a female householder with no husband present, and 34.6% were non-families. 32.7% of all households were made up of individuals, and 20.2% had someone living alone who was 65 years of age or older. The average household size was 2.29 and the average family size was 2.85.

In the village, the population was spread out, with 25.2% under the age of 18, 4.2% from 18 to 24, 21.4% from 25 to 44, 25.2% from 45 to 64, and 23.9% who were 65 years of age or older. The median age was 42 years. For every 100 females, there were 101.7 males. For every 100 females age 18 and over, there were 91.4 males.

As of 2000 the median income for a household in the village was $31,875, and the median income for a family was $39,375. Males had a median income of $27,500 versus $16,250 for females. The per capita income for the village was $14,115. About 8.8% of families and 11.9% of the population were below the poverty line, including 12.5% of those under the age of eighteen and 21.6% of those 65 or over.

== See also ==
- List of municipalities in Nebraska
