= Martinsburg, Nebraska =

Village in Dixon County, Nebraska, United States

- Village
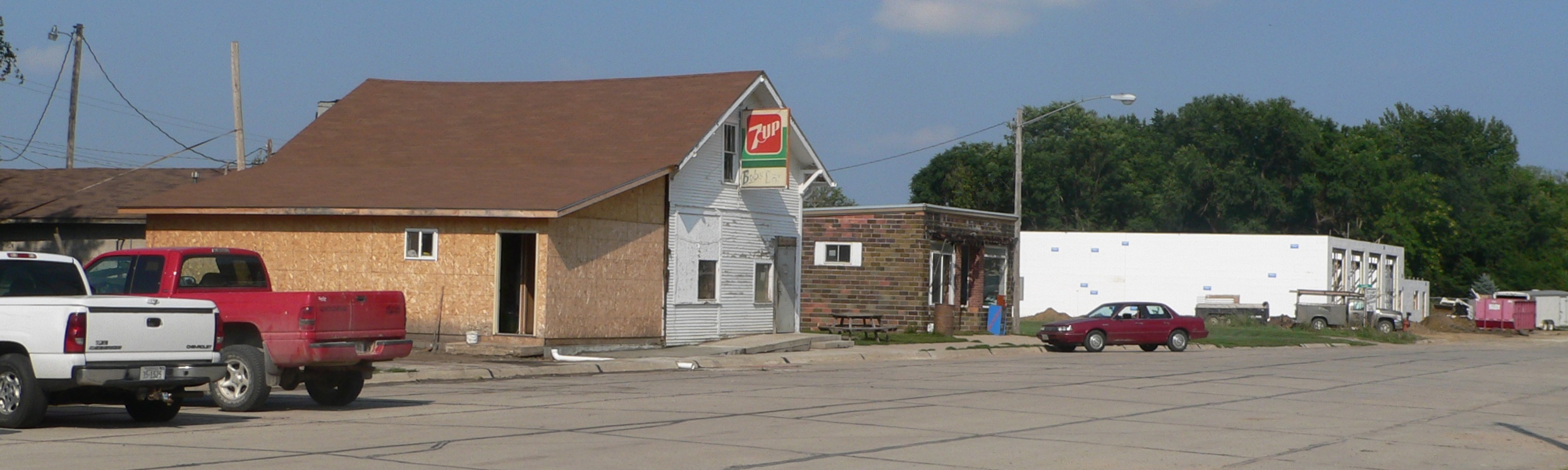
- Downtown Martinsburg: Main Street, August 2013

- Location of Martinsburg, Nebraska
- Coordinates: 42°30′31″N 96°49′55″W
- Country: United States
- State: Nebraska
- County: Dixon

Area
  - Total: 0.10 sq mi (0.27 km^{2})
  - Land: 0.10 sq mi (0.27 km^{2})
  - Water: 0 sq mi (0.00 km^{2})
- Elevation: 1,253 ft (382 m)

Population (2020)
  - Total: 78
  - Density: 747.6/sq mi (288.65/km^{2})
- Time zone: UTC-6 (Central (CST))
  - Summer (DST): UTC-5 (CDT)
- ZIP codes: 68710, 68770
- Area code: 402
- FIPS code: 31-30940
- GNIS feature ID: 2399266

Martinsburg is a village in Dixon County, Nebraska, United States. It is part of the Sioux City, IA–NE–SD Metropolitan Statistical Area. As of the 2020 census, Martinsburg had a population of 78.

== History ==
Martinsburg was laid out in 1874. It was named for its founder, Jonathan Martin.

A post office was established at Martinsburg (also spelled historically Martinsburgh) in 1880, and remained in operation until it was discontinued in 1967.

== Geography ==
According to the United States Census Bureau, the village has a total area of 0.10 square miles (0.26 km^{2}), all land.

== Demographics ==
Historical population
Census	Pop.	Note	%±
1880	39		—
1910	291		—
1920	303		4.1%
1930	93		−69.3%
1940	105		12.9%
1950	79		−24.8%
1960	68		−13.9%
1970	73		7.4%
1980	100		37.0%
1990	90		−10.0%
2000	103		14.4%
2010	94		−8.7%
2020	78		−17.0%
U.S. Decennial Census

=== 2010 census ===
As of the census of 2010, there were 94 people, 38 households, and 27 families residing in the village. The population density was 940.0 inhabitants per square mile (362.9/km^{2}). There were 41 housing units at an average density of 410.0 per square mile (158.3/km^{2}). The racial makeup of the village was 97.9% White, 1.1% Asian, and 1.1% from two or more races. Hispanic or Latino of any race were 3.2% of the population.

There were 38 households, of which 36.8% had children under the age of 18 living with them, 55.3% were married couples living together, 15.8% had a female householder with no husband present, and 28.9% were non-families. 28.9% of all households were made up of individuals, and 15.8% had someone living alone who was 65 years of age or older. The average household size was 2.47 and the average family size was 3.04.

The median age in the village was 45.5 years. 28.7% of residents were under the age of 18; 4.3% were between the ages of 18 and 24; 16.9% were from 25 to 44; 37.2% were from 45 to 64; and 12.8% were 65 years of age or older. The gender makeup of the village was 41.5% male and 58.5% female.

=== 2000 census ===
At the 2000 census, there were 103 people, 39 households and 26 families residing in the village. The population density was 996.6 inhabitants per square mile (384.8/km^{2}). There were 40 housing units at an average density of 387.0 per square mile (149.4/km^{2}). The racial makeup of the village was 99.03% White, and 0.97% from two or more races. Hispanic or Latino of any race were 1.94% of the population.

There were 39 households, of which 38.5% had children under the age of 18 living with them, 59.0% were married couples living together, 2.6% had a female householder with no husband present, and 30.8% were non-families. 30.8% of all households were made up of individuals, and 20.5% had someone living alone who was 65 years of age or older. The average household size was 2.64 and the average family size was 3.37.

32.0% of the population were under the age of 18, 5.8% from 18 to 24, 23.3% from 25 to 44, 20.4% from 45 to 64, and 18.4% who were 65 years of age or older. The median age was 40 years. For every 100 females, there were 87.3 males. For every 100 females age 18 and over, there were 84.2 males.

As of 2000 the median income for a household was $38,333 and the median family income was $40,938. Males had a median income of $26,750 versus $17,917 for females. The per capita income for the village was $11,750. There were no families and 5.8% of the population living below the poverty line, including no under eighteens and 57.1% of those over 64.

== See also ==
- List of municipalities in Nebraska
