= Maskell, Nebraska =

Village in Dixon County, Nebraska, United States

- Village
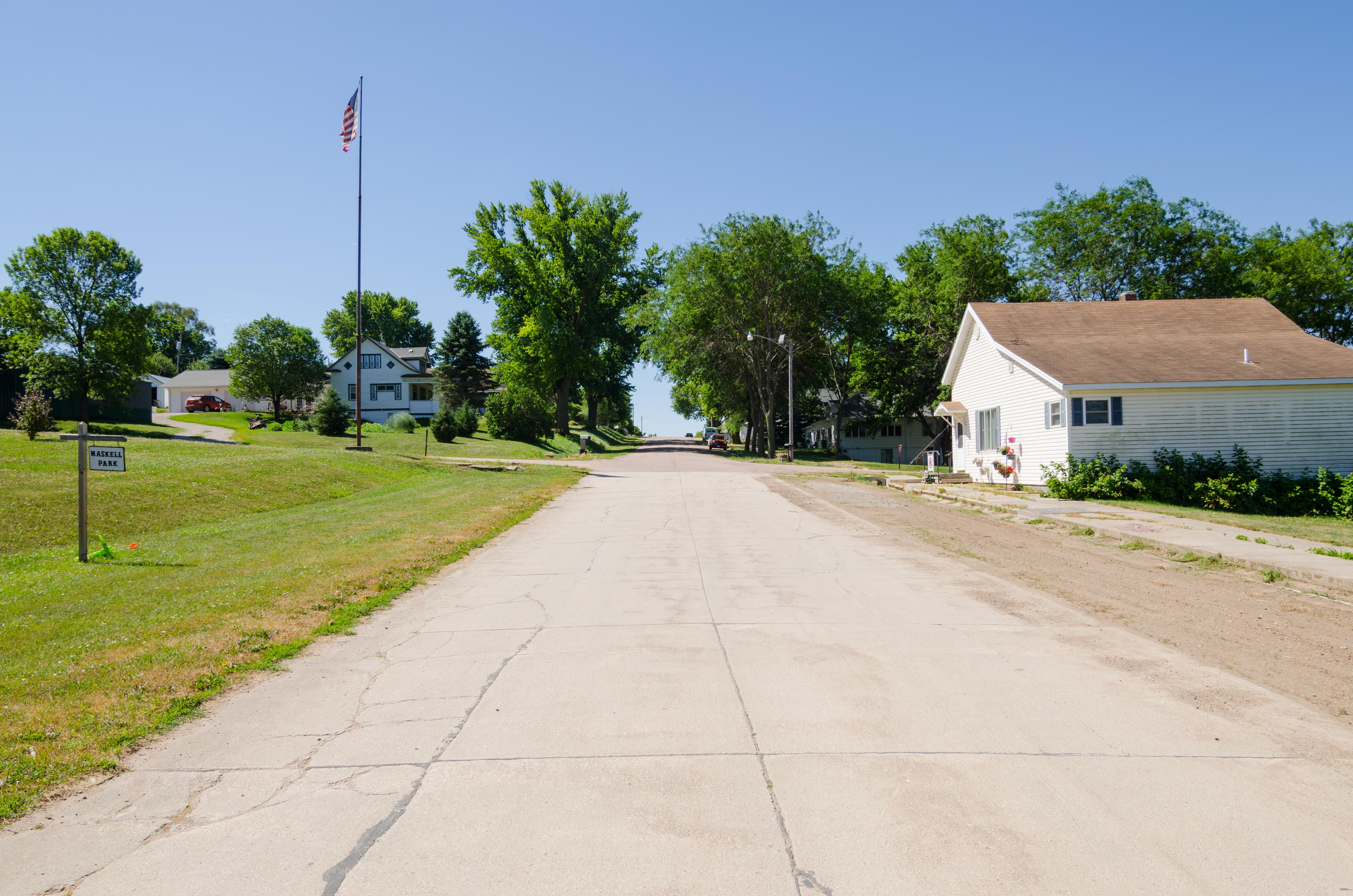
- South on Main Street in Maskell, July 2017

- Location of Maskell, Nebraska
- Coordinates: 42°41′26″N 96°58′51″W
- Country: United States
- State: Nebraska
- County: Dixon

Area
  - Total: 0.16 sq mi (0.41 km^{2})
  - Land: 0.16 sq mi (0.41 km^{2})
  - Water: 0 sq mi (0.00 km^{2})
- Elevation: 1,309 ft (399 m)

Population (2020)
  - Total: 58
  - Density: 369.5/sq mi (142.68/km^{2})
- Time zone: UTC-6 (Central (CST))
  - Summer (DST): UTC-5 (CDT)
- ZIP code: 68751
- Area code: 402
- FIPS code: 31-31045
- GNIS feature ID: 2399270

Maskell is a village in Dixon County, Nebraska, United States. It is part of the Sioux City, IA–NE–SD Metropolitan Statistical Area. As of the 2020 census, Maskell had a population of 58. It is reportedly home to the smallest city hall in the United States.

== History ==
Maskell was platted in 1907 when the Chicago, St. Paul, Minneapolis and Omaha Railway was extended to that point. There are two conflicting resources on how Maskell was named. In one source, Maskell was named for John Maskell, a pioneer settler. According to another, it was named after A. H. Maskell, an owner of the surrounding land and sheriff of Dixon County.

== Geography ==
According to the United States Census Bureau, the village has a total area of 0.16 square miles (0.41 km^{2}), all land.

== Demographics ==
Historical population
Census	Pop.	Note	%±
1920	165		—
1930	131		−20.6%
1940	138		5.3%
1950	84		−39.1%
1960	54		−35.7%
1970	43		−20.4%
1980	76		76.7%
1990	54		−28.9%
2000	67		24.1%
2010	76		13.4%
2020	58		−23.7%
U.S. Decennial Census

=== 2010 census ===
At the 2010 census there were 76 people, 33 households, and 22 families in the village. The population density was 475.0 inhabitants per square mile (183.4/km^{2}). There were 34 housing units at an average density of 212.5 per square mile (82.0/km^{2}). The racial makeup of the village was 98.7% White and 1.3% from two or more races. Hispanic or Latino of any race were 2.6%.

Of the 33 households 30.3% had children under the age of 18 living with them, 48.5% were married couples living together, 15.2% had a female householder with no husband present, 3.0% had a male householder with no wife present, and 33.3% were non-families. 24.2% of households were one person and 15.1% were one person aged 65 or older. The average household size was 2.30 and the average family size was 2.73.

The median age in the village was 40.5 years. 27.6% of residents were under the age of 18; 6.6% were between the ages of 18 and 24; 21% were from 25 to 44; 28.9% were from 45 to 64; and 15.8% were 65 or older. The gender makeup of the village was 50.0% male and 50.0% female.

=== 2000 census ===
At the 2000 census there were 67 people, 24 households, and 18 families in the village. The population density was 438.1 inhabitants per square mile (169.2/km^{2}). There were 31 housing units at an average density of 202.7 per square mile (78.3/km^{2}). The racial makeup of the village was 100.00% White. Of the 24 households 33.3% had children under the age of 18 living with them, 70.8% were married couples living together, 4.2% had a female householder with no husband present, and 25.0% were non-families. 25.0% of households were one person and 16.7% were one person aged 65 or older. The average household size was 2.79 and the average family size was 3.39.

The age distribution was 31.3% under the age of 18, 7.5% from 18 to 24, 17.9% from 25 to 44, 28.4% from 45 to 64, and 14.9% 65 or older. The median age was 38 years. For every 100 females, there were 103.0 males. For every 100 females age 18 and over, there were 84.0 males.

The median household income was $40,000, and the median family income was $53,750. Males had a median income of $72,917 versus $72,500 for females. The per capita income for the village was $24,906. There were 10.5% of families and 7.1% of the population living below the poverty line, including 10.7% of under eighteens and none of those over 64.

== See also ==
- List of municipalities in Nebraska
