= Dixon, Nebraska =

Village in Dixon County, Nebraska, United States

- Village
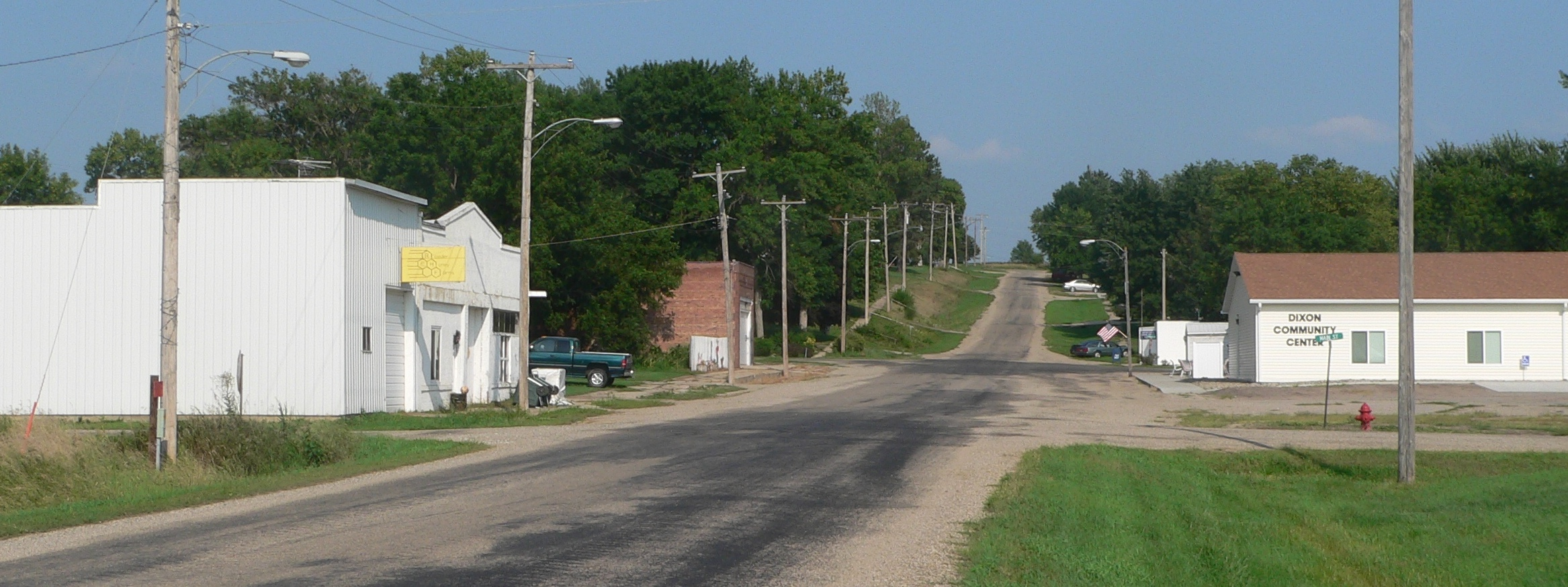
- Downtown Dixon: 2nd Street, August 2013

- Location of Dixon, Nebraska
- Coordinates: 42°24′55″N 96°59′41″W
- Country: United States
- State: Nebraska
- County: Dixon

Area
  - Total: 0.15 sq mi (0.39 km^{2})
  - Land: 0.15 sq mi (0.39 km^{2})
  - Water: 0 sq mi (0.00 km^{2})
- Elevation: 1,444 ft (440 m)

Population (2020)
  - Total: 77
  - Density: 507.5/sq mi (195.94/km^{2})
- Time zone: UTC-6 (Central (CST))
  - Summer (DST): UTC-5 (CDT)
- ZIP code: 68732
- Area code: 402
- FIPS code: 31-13225
- GNIS feature ID: 2398732

Dixon is a village in Dixon County, Nebraska, United States. It is part of the Sioux City, IA–NE–SD Metropolitan Statistical Area. The population was 77 at the 2020 census.

Dixon is part of the Sioux City, IA–NE–SD Metropolitan Statistical Area.

== History ==
Dixon was platted in 1890 by the railroad. It took its name from Dixon County, which was named for a pioneer settler. Dixon was incorporated as a village in 1893.

== Geography ==
According to the United States Census Bureau, the village has a total area of 0.15 square miles (0.39 km^{2}), all land.

== Demographics ==
Historical population
Census	Pop.	Note	%±
1900	157		—
1910	217		38.2%
1920	241		11.1%
1930	222		−7.9%
1940	226		1.8%
1950	159		−29.6%
1960	139		−12.6%
1970	128		−7.9%
1980	127		−0.8%
1990	87		−31.5%
2000	108		24.1%
2010	87		−19.4%
2020	77		−11.5%
U.S. Decennial Census

=== 2010 census ===
At the 2010 census there were 87 people, 39 households, and 23 families in the village. The population density was 580.0 inhabitants per square mile (223.9/km^{2}). There were 46 housing units at an average density of 306.7 per square mile (118.4/km^{2}). The racial makeup of the village was 98.9% White and 1.1% Native American. Of the 39 households 23.1% had children under the age of 18 living with them, 43.6% were married couples living together, 10.3% had a female householder with no husband present, 5.1% had a male householder with no wife present, and 41.0% were non-families. 41.0% of households were one person and 25.6% were one person aged 65 or older. The average household size was 2.23 and the average family size was 3.04.

The median age in the village was 51.3 years. 19.5% of residents were under the age of 18; 5.8% were between the ages of 18 and 24; 19.4% were from 25 to 44; 28.6% were from 45 to 64; and 26.4% were 65 or older. The gender makeup of the village was 46.0% male and 54.0% female.

=== 2000 census ===
At the 2000 census there were 108 people, 49 households, and 31 families in the village. The population density was 702.3 inhabitants per square mile (271.2/km^{2}). There were 51 housing units at an average density of 331.6 per square mile (128.0/km^{2}). The racial makeup of the village was 93.52% White, 6.48% from other races. Hispanic or Latino of any race were 9.26%.

Of the 49 households 22.4% had children under the age of 18 living with them, 53.1% were married couples living together, 10.2% had a female householder with no husband present, and 36.7% were non-families. 36.7% of households were one person and 22.4% were one person aged 65 or older. The average household size was 2.20 and the average family size was 2.81.

The age distribution was 23.1% under the age of 18, 4.6% from 18 to 24, 21.3% from 25 to 44, 23.1% from 45 to 64, and 27.8% 65 or older. The median age was 46 years. For every 100 females, there were 107.7 males. For every 100 females age 18 and over, there were 88.6 males.

The median household income was $27,188, and the median family income was $35,625. Males had a median income of $28,750 versus $11,250 for females. The per capita income for the village was $12,870. There were 9.7% of families and 20.2% of the population living below the poverty line, including 51.5% of under eighteens and 5.9% of those over 64.

== See also ==
- List of municipalities in Nebraska
