= Silvercreek Township, Dixon County, Nebraska =

Silvercreek Township
- Township
- Location in Dixon County
- Coordinates: 42°34′44″N 096°50′41″W
- Country: United States
- State: Nebraska
- County: Dixon

Area
  - Total: 35.88 sq mi (92.94 km^{2})
  - Land: 35.85 sq mi (92.85 km^{2})
  - Water: 0.031 sq mi (0.08 km^{2}) 0.09%
- Elevation: 1,296 ft (395 m)

Population (2020)
  - Total: 128
  - Density: 3.57/sq mi (1.38/km^{2})
- GNIS feature ID: 0838254

Silvercreek Township is one of thirteen townships in Dixon County, Nebraska, United States. The population was 128 at the 2020 census. A 2021 estimate placed the township's population at 126.

== See also ==
- County government in Nebraska
