= Daily Township, Dixon County, Nebraska =

Daily Township
- Township
- Location in Dixon County
- Coordinates: 42°33′55″N 096°57′58″W
- Country: United States
- State: Nebraska
- County: Dixon

Area
  - Total: 35.78 sq mi (92.67 km^{2})
  - Land: 35.75 sq mi (92.59 km^{2})
  - Water: 0.031 sq mi (0.08 km^{2}) 0.09%
- Elevation: 1,503 ft (458 m)

Population (2020)
  - Total: 50
  - Density: 1.4/sq mi (0.54/km^{2})
- GNIS feature ID: 0837955

Daily Township is one of thirteen townships in Dixon County, Nebraska, United States. The population was 50 at the 2020 census. A 2021 estimate placed the township's population at 50.
