= Ottercreek Township, Dixon County, Nebraska =

Ottercreek Township
- Township
- Location in Dixon County
- Coordinates: 42°27′43″N 096°45′11″W
- Country: United States
- State: Nebraska
- County: Dixon

Area
  - Total: 26.80 sq mi (69.42 km^{2})
  - Land: 26.80 sq mi (69.42 km^{2})
  - Water: 0 sq mi (0 km^{2}) 0%
- Elevation: 1,293 ft (394 m)

Population (2020)
  - Total: 208
  - Density: 7.76/sq mi (3.00/km^{2})
- GNIS feature ID: 0838180

Ottercreek Township is one of thirteen townships in Dixon County, Nebraska, United States. The population was 208 at the 2020 census. A 2021 estimate placed the township's population at 206.

== See also ==
- County government in Nebraska
