= Emerson Township, Dixon County, Nebraska =

Emerson Township
- Township
- Location in Dixon County
- Coordinates: 42°19′46″N 096°45′20″W
- Country: United States
- State: Nebraska
- County: Dixon

Area
  - Total: 26.55 sq mi (68.77 km^{2})
  - Land: 26.54 sq mi (68.75 km^{2})
  - Water: 0.0077 sq mi (0.02 km^{2}) 0.03%
- Elevation: 1,486 ft (453 m)

Population (2020)
  - Total: 488
  - Density: 18.4/sq mi (7.10/km^{2})
- GNIS feature ID: 0837990

Emerson Township is one of thirteen townships in Dixon County, Nebraska, United States. The population was 488 at the 2020 census. A 2021 estimate placed the township's population at 480.

== See also ==
- County government in Nebraska
