= Wakefield Township, Dixon County, Nebraska =

Wakefield Township
- Township
- Location in Dixon County
- Coordinates: 42°18′53″N 096°51′03″W
- Country: United States
- State: Nebraska
- County: Dixon

Area
  - Total: 35.95 sq mi (93.11 km^{2})
  - Land: 35.90 sq mi (92.99 km^{2})
  - Water: 0.046 sq mi (0.12 km^{2}) 0.13%
- Elevation: 1,532 ft (467 m)

Population (2020)
  - Total: 1,399
  - Density: 38.97/sq mi (15.04/km^{2})
- GNIS feature ID: 0838312

Wakefield Township is one of thirteen townships in Dixon County, Nebraska, United States. The population was 1,399 at the 2020 census. A 2021 estimate placed the township's population at 1,382.

== See also ==
- County government in Nebraska
