= Ponca Township, Dixon County, Nebraska =

Ponca Township
- Township
- Location in Dixon County
- Coordinates: 42°35′19″N 096°43′55″W
- Country: United States
- State: Nebraska
- County: Dixon

Area
  - Total: 49.16 sq mi (127.32 km^{2})
  - Land: 46.75 sq mi (121.08 km^{2})
  - Water: 2.41 sq mi (6.24 km^{2}) 4.9%
- Elevation: 1,322 ft (403 m)

Population (2020)
  - Total: 372
  - Density: 7.96/sq mi (3.07/km^{2})
- GNIS feature ID: 0838196

Ponca Township is one of thirteen townships in Dixon County, Nebraska, United States. The population was 372 at the 2020 census. A 2021 estimate placed the township's population at 368.

== See also ==
- County government in Nebraska
