= Concord Township, Dixon County, Nebraska =

Concord Township
- Township
- Location in Dixon County
- Coordinates: 42°23′33″N 096°57′22″W
- Country: United States
- State: Nebraska
- County: Dixon

Area
  - Total: 35.86 sq mi (92.87 km^{2})
  - Land: 35.85 sq mi (92.85 km^{2})
  - Water: 0.0077 sq mi (0.02 km^{2}) 0.02%
- Elevation: 1,480 ft (451 m)

Population (2020)
  - Total: 329
  - Density: 9.18/sq mi (3.54/km^{2})
- GNIS feature ID: 0837936

Concord Township is one of thirteen townships in Dixon County, Nebraska, United States. The population was 329 at the 2020 census. A 2021 estimate placed the township's population at 324.

== See also ==
- County government in Nebraska
