= Clark Township, Dixon County, Nebraska =

Clark Township
- Township
- Location in Dixon County
- Coordinates: 42°29′19″N 096°56′49″W
- Country: United States
- State: Nebraska
- County: Dixon

Area
  - Total: 36.11 sq mi (93.52 km^{2})
  - Land: 36.09 sq mi (93.47 km^{2})
  - Water: 0.015 sq mi (0.04 km^{2}) 0.04%
- Elevation: 1,480 ft (450 m)

Population (2020)
  - Total: 122
  - Density: 3.38/sq mi (1.31/km^{2})
- GNIS feature ID: 0837920

Clark Township is one of thirteen townships in Dixon County, Nebraska, United States. The population was 122 at the 2020 census. A 2021 estimate placed the township's population at 121.

== See also ==
- County government in Nebraska
