= Dixon County, Nebraska =

County in Nebraska, United States

- County
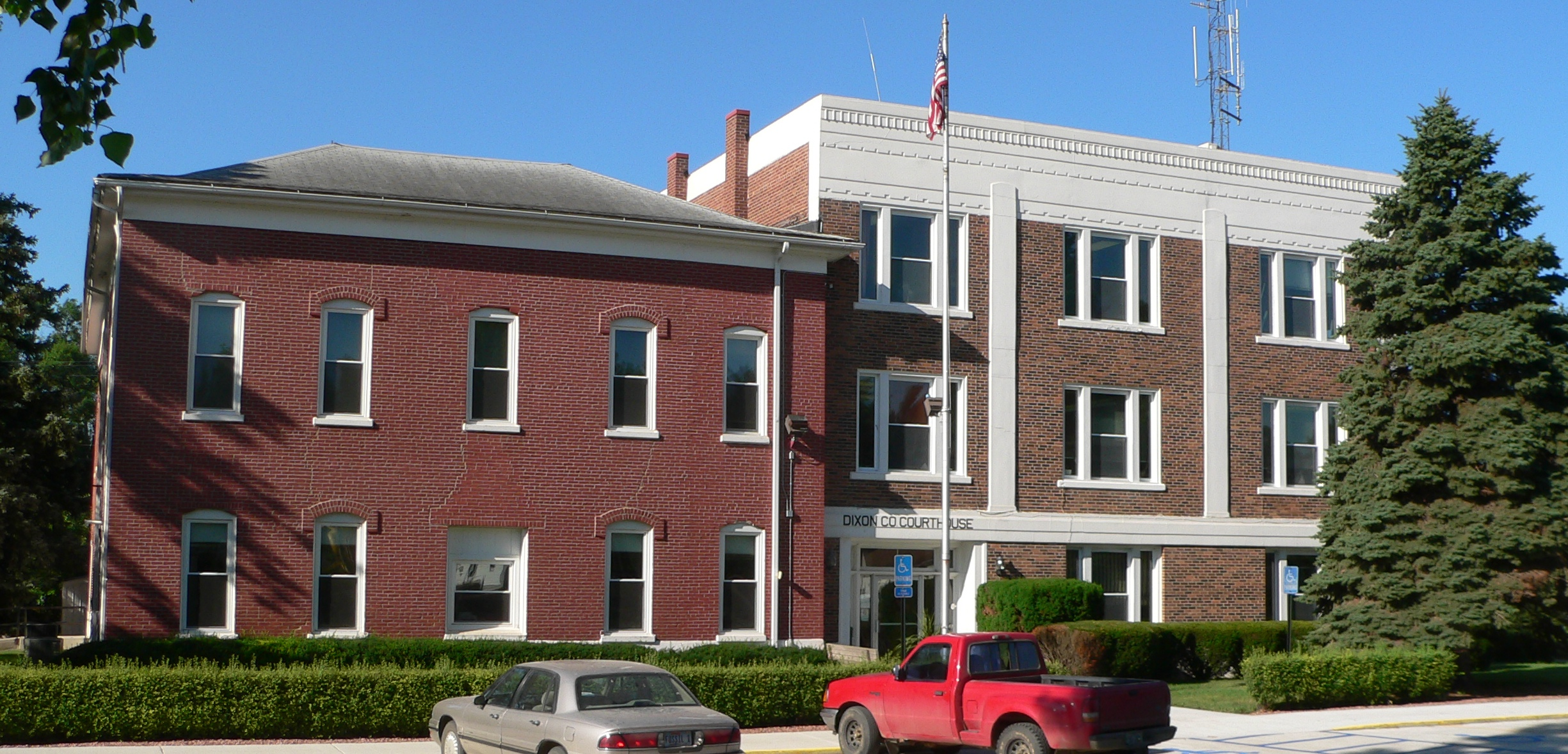
- Dixon County Courthouse in Ponca

- Location within the U.S. state of Nebraska
- Coordinates: 42°30′N 96°52′W
- Country: United States
- State: Nebraska
- Founded: 1856 (authorized); 1858 (organized)
- Seat: Ponca
- Largest city: Wakefield

Area
  - Total: 483 sq mi (1,250 km^{2})
  - Land: 476 sq mi (1,230 km^{2})
  - Water: 6.7 sq mi (17 km^{2}) 1.4%

Population (2020)
  - Total: 5,606
  - Estimate (2025): 5,602 ▼
  - Density: 11.8/sq mi (4.55/km^{2})
- Time zone: UTC−6 (Central)
  - Summer (DST): UTC−5 (CDT)
- Congressional district: 3rd
- Website: dixoncountyne.gov

Dixon County is a county in the U.S. state of Nebraska. As of the 2020 United States census, the population was 5,606. Its county seat is Ponca. The county was created in 1856 and attached to Dakota County. It was organized in 1858. Dixon County is part of the Sioux City metropolitan area. In the Nebraska license plate system, Dixon County is represented by the prefix 35 (it had the 35th-largest number of vehicles registered in the county when the license plate system was established in 1922).

== History ==
Dixon County was formed in 1856. Dixon was named for an early settler.

== Geography ==
Dixon County lies at the northeast edge of the state. Its northern boundary line abuts the southern boundary line of the state of South Dakota, across the Missouri River. According to the US Census Bureau, the county has an area of 483 square miles (1,250 km^{2}), of which 476 square miles (1,230 km^{2}) is land and 6.7 square miles (17 km^{2}) (1.4%) is water.

=== Major highways ===
- U.S. Highway 20
- Nebraska Highway 9
- Nebraska Highway 12
- Nebraska Highway 15
- Nebraska Highway 35
- Nebraska Highway 116

=== National protected area ===
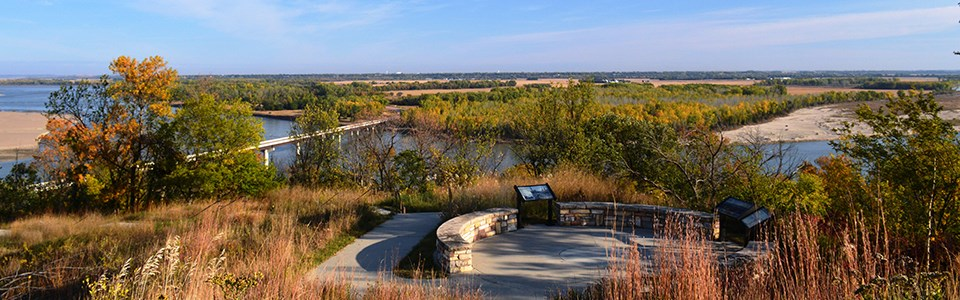
View of the Missouri River from Mulberry Bend Overlook in northwestern Dixon County, near Maskell (Missouri National Recreational River)

- Missouri National Recreational River (part)

=== State protected area ===
- Buckskin Hills State Wildlife Management Area
- Ponca State Park
- Tarbox Hollow Living Prairie

=== Adjacent counties ===
- Union County, South Dakota - northeast
- Dakota County - east
- Thurston County - southeast
- Wayne County - southwest
- Cedar County - west
- Clay County, South Dakota - northwest

== Demographics ==
Historical population
Census	Pop.	Note	%±
1860	274		—
1870	1,345		390.9%
1880	4,177		210.6%
1890	8,084		93.5%
1900	10,535		30.3%
1910	11,477		8.9%
1920	11,815		2.9%
1930	11,586		−1.9%
1940	10,413		−10.1%
1950	9,129		−12.3%
1960	8,106		−11.2%
1970	7,453		−8.1%
1980	7,137		−4.2%
1990	6,143		−13.9%
2000	6,339		3.2%
2010	6,000		−5.3%
2020	5,606		−6.6%
2025 (est.)	5,602	▼	−0.1%
US Decennial Census; 1790-1960 1900-1990; 1990-2000 2010 2020 2022

=== 2020 census ===
As of the 2020 census, the county had a population of 5,606. The median age was 41.9 years. 24.8% of residents were under the age of 18 and 21.9% of residents were 65 years of age or older. For every 100 females there were 104.8 males, and for every 100 females age 18 and over there were 102.2 males age 18 and over.

The racial makeup of the county was 84.5% White, 0.3% Black or African American, 0.6% American Indian and Alaska Native, 0.4% Asian, 0.0% Native Hawaiian and Pacific Islander, 7.3% from some other race, and 7.0% from two or more races. Hispanic or Latino residents of any race comprised 14.2% of the population.

0.0% of residents lived in urban areas, while 100.0% lived in rural areas.

There were 2,206 households in the county, of which 31.3% had children under the age of 18 living with them and 19.9% had a female householder with no spouse or partner present. About 26.6% of all households were made up of individuals and 13.7% had someone living alone who was 65 years of age or older.

There were 2,520 housing units, of which 12.5% were vacant. Among occupied housing units, 77.5% were owner-occupied and 22.5% were renter-occupied. The homeowner vacancy rate was 1.1% and the rental vacancy rate was 8.2%.

=== Prior censuses ===
As of the 2000 United States census, there were 6,339 people, 2,413 households, and 1,705 families in the county. The population density was 13 people per square mile (5.0 people/km^{2}). There were 2,673 housing units at an average density of 6 units per square mile (2.3/km^{2}). The racial makeup of the county was 94.64% White, 0.03% Black or African American, 0.49% Native American, 0.27% Asian, 3.79% from other races, and 0.79% from two or more races. 5.49% of the population were Hispanic or Latino of any race. 45.5% were of German, 10.4% Irish, 8.5% Swedish, 5.9% American, 5.9% Norwegian and 5.1% English.

There were 2,413 households, out of which 33.30% had children under the age of 18 living with them, 61.50% were married couples living together, 6.50% had a female householder with no husband present, and 29.30% were non-families. 25.90% of all households were made up of individuals, and 14.40% had someone living alone who was 65 years of age or older. The average household size was 2.58 and the average family size was 3.12.

The county population contained 27.50% under the age of 18, 7.10% from 18 to 24, 24.90% from 25 to 44, 22.40% from 45 to 64, and 18.20% who were 65 years of age or older. The median age was 39 years. For every 100 females, there were 98.50 males. For every 100 females age 18 and over, there were 94.50 males.

The median income for a household in the county was $34,201, and the median income for a family was $41,122. Males had a median income of $27,784 versus $20,573 for females. The per capita income for the county was $15,350. About 7.50% of families and 10.00% of the population were below the poverty line, including 12.40% of those under age 18 and 9.00% of those age 65 or over.

== Communities ==
=== Cities ===
- Ponca (county seat)
- Wakefield

=== Villages ===
- Allen
- Concord
- Dixon
- Emerson
- Martinsburg
- Maskell
- Newcastle
- Waterbury

=== Unincorporated community ===
- Lime Grove

=== Townships ===
- Clark
- Concord
- Daily
- Emerson
- Galena
- Hooker
- Logan
- Newcastle
- Ottercreek
- Ponca
- Silvercreek
- Springbank
- Wakefield

== Politics ==
Dixon County voters have been reliably Republican for decades. In only one national election since 1936 has the county selected the Democratic Party candidate, and that was the election of 1964, during Lyndon B. Johnson's landslide victory. However, he only narrowly won the county then.

United States presidential election results for Dixon County, Nebraska
Year	Republican		Democratic		Third party(ies)	
Year	No.	%	No.	%	No.	%
1900	1,285	52.45%	1,101	44.94%	64	2.61%
1904	1,524	64.80%	571	24.28%	257	10.93%
1908	1,257	51.69%	1,100	45.23%	75	3.08%
1912	582	24.04%	823	33.99%	1,016	41.97%
1916	1,208	46.20%	1,350	51.63%	57	2.18%
1920	2,435	71.43%	911	26.72%	63	1.85%
1924	2,153	50.98%	1,090	25.81%	980	23.21%
1928	2,982	64.81%	1,607	34.93%	12	0.26%
1932	1,620	34.82%	2,953	63.46%	80	1.72%
1936	2,108	43.29%	2,640	54.21%	122	2.51%
1940	3,038	61.37%	1,912	38.63%	0	0.00%
1944	2,382	61.95%	1,463	38.05%	0	0.00%
1948	1,899	52.44%	1,722	47.56%	0	0.00%
1952	2,977	70.44%	1,249	29.56%	0	0.00%
1956	2,493	59.09%	1,726	40.91%	0	0.00%
1960	2,713	66.22%	1,384	33.78%	0	0.00%
1964	1,845	49.11%	1,912	50.89%	0	0.00%
1968	2,051	65.65%	890	28.49%	183	5.86%
1972	2,299	70.96%	941	29.04%	0	0.00%
1976	1,981	59.35%	1,286	38.53%	71	2.13%
1980	2,328	68.77%	822	24.28%	235	6.94%
1984	2,155	68.11%	986	31.16%	23	0.73%
1988	1,802	60.53%	1,166	39.17%	9	0.30%
1992	1,484	48.59%	830	27.18%	740	24.23%
1996	1,478	51.95%	931	32.72%	436	15.33%
2000	1,834	65.69%	820	29.37%	138	4.94%
2004	2,028	67.40%	938	31.17%	43	1.43%
2008	1,785	63.89%	946	33.86%	63	2.25%
2012	1,745	64.97%	870	32.39%	71	2.64%
2016	2,041	73.36%	556	19.99%	185	6.65%
2020	2,335	75.47%	651	21.04%	108	3.49%
2024	2,271	78.20%	573	19.73%	60	2.07%

== Education ==
School districts include:

- Allen Consolidated Schools
- Emerson-Hubbard Public Schools
- Hartington Newcastle Public Schools
- Laurel-Concord-Coleridge School
- Ponca Public Schools
- Wakefield Public Schools
- Wayne Community Schools
- Wynot Public Schools

== See also ==
- National Register of Historic Places listings in Dixon County, Nebraska
