= Galena Township, Dixon County, Nebraska =

Galena Township
- Township
- Location in Dixon County
- Coordinates: 42°28′54″N 096°50′15″W
- Country: United States
- State: Nebraska
- County: Dixon

Area
  - Total: 36.0 sq mi (93.2 km^{2})
  - Land: 35.92 sq mi (93.02 km^{2})
  - Water: 0.069 sq mi (0.18 km^{2}) 0.19%
- Elevation: 1,276 ft (389 m)

Population (2020)
  - Total: 244
  - Density: 6.79/sq mi (2.62/km^{2})
- GNIS feature ID: 0838014

Galena Township is one of thirteen townships in Dixon County, Nebraska, United States. The population was 244 at the 2020 census. A 2021 estimate placed the township's population at 241.

== See also ==
- County government in Nebraska
