= Hooker Township, Dixon County, Nebraska =

Hooker Township
- Township
- Location in Dixon County
- Coordinates: 42°41′11″N 096°57′25″W
- Country: United States
- State: Nebraska
- County: Dixon

Area
  - Total: 52.83 sq mi (136.83 km^{2})
  - Land: 50.68 sq mi (131.27 km^{2})
  - Water: 2.15 sq mi (5.56 km^{2}) 4.06%
- Elevation: 1,319 ft (402 m)

Population (2020)
  - Total: 186
  - Density: 3.67/sq mi (1.42/km^{2})
- GNIS feature ID: 0838061

Hooker Township is one of thirteen townships in Dixon County, Nebraska, United States. The population was 186 at the 2020 census. A 2021 estimate placed the township's population at 184.

== See also ==
- County government in Nebraska
