= Newcastle Township, Dixon County, Nebraska =

Newcastle Township
- Township
- Location in Dixon County
- Coordinates: 42°40′12″N 096°51′06″W
- Country: United States
- State: Nebraska
- County: Dixon

Area
  - Total: 39.50 sq mi (102.31 km^{2})
  - Land: 37.95 sq mi (98.28 km^{2})
  - Water: 1.55 sq mi (4.02 km^{2}) 3.93%
- Elevation: 1,388 ft (423 m)

Population (2020)
  - Total: 439
  - Density: 11.6/sq mi (4.47/km^{2})
- GNIS feature ID: 0838156

Newcastle Township is one of thirteen townships in Dixon County, Nebraska, United States. The population was 439 at the 2020 census. A 2021 estimate placed the township's population at 436.

== See also ==
- County government in Nebraska
- List of Nebraska townships
