= Springbank Township, Dixon County, Nebraska =

Springbank Township
- Township
- Location in Dixon County
- Coordinates: 42°23′30″N 096°50′52″W
- Country: United States
- State: Nebraska
- County: Dixon

Area
  - Total: 35.73 sq mi (92.55 km^{2})
  - Land: 35.7 sq mi (92.5 km^{2})
  - Water: 0.019 sq mi (0.05 km^{2}) 0.05%
- Elevation: 1,506 ft (459 m)

Population (2020)
  - Total: 545
  - Density: 15.3/sq mi (5.89/km^{2})
- GNIS feature ID: 0838265

Springbank Township is one of thirteen townships in Dixon County, Nebraska, United States. The population was 545 at the 2020 census. A 2021 estimate placed the township's population at 538.

== See also ==
- County government in Nebraska
