= Nebraska Highway 35 =

State highway in Nebraska, U.S.

State Highway 35

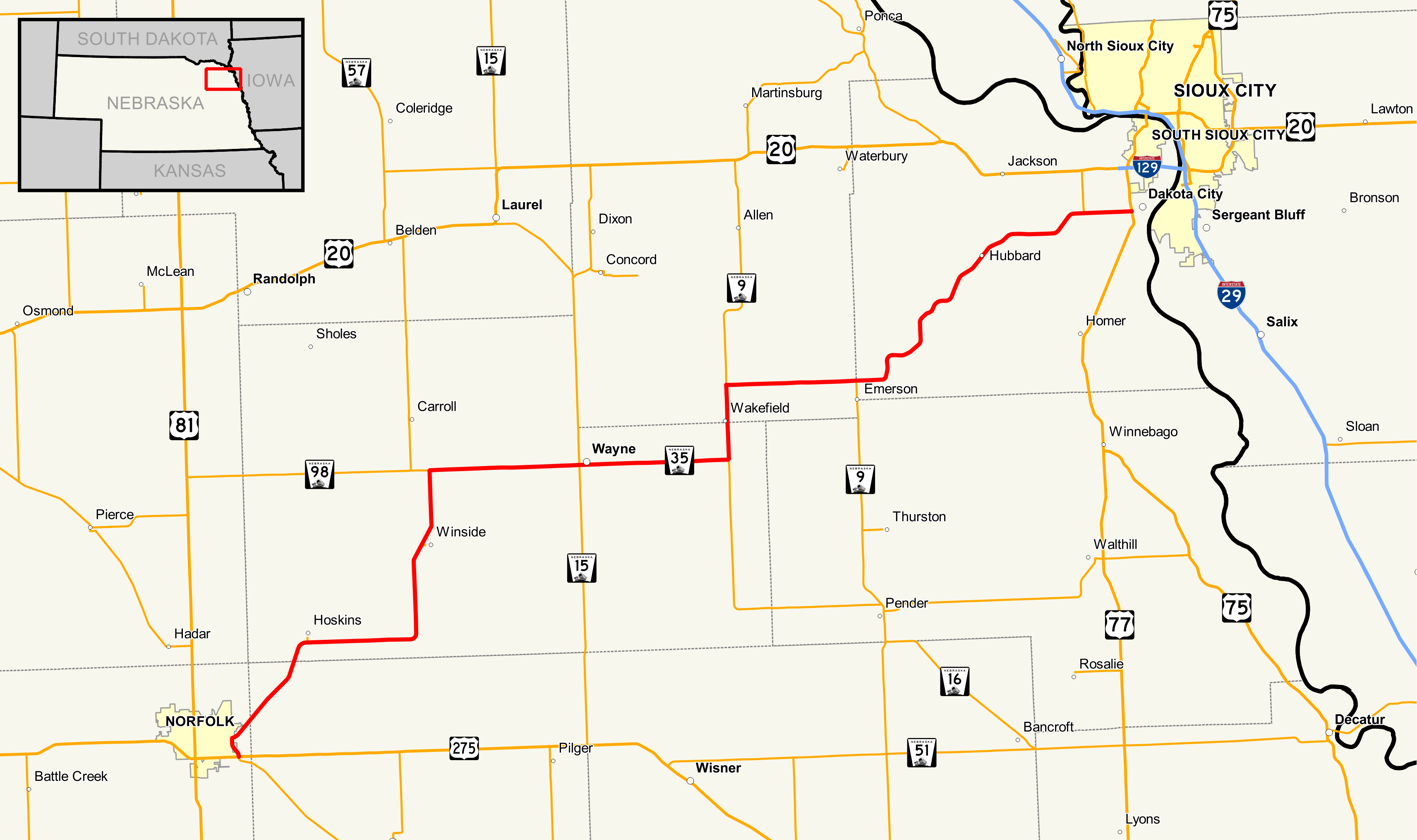
- Nebraska Highway 35 highlighted in red

Route information
- Maintained by NDOT
- Length: 69.51 mi (111.87 km)
- Existed: 1926–present

Major junctions
- West end: US 275 / N-24 in Norfolk
- N-98 north of Winside; N-15 in Wayne; N-16 south of Wakefield; N-9 north of Wakefield; N-9 north of Emerson; N-110 west of Dakota City
- East end: US 75 / US 77 west of Dakota City

Location
- Country: United States
- State: Nebraska
- Counties: Madison, Stanton, Wayne, Dixon, Dakota

Highway system
- Nebraska State Highway System; Interstate; US; State; Link; Spur; State Spurs; Recreation
← US 34	→ N-36

Nebraska Highway 35 (N-35) is a 69.51-mile (111.87 km) state highway in northeastern Nebraska, United States, that connects U.S. Route 275 (US 275) and Nebraska Highway 24 (N-24) in Norfolk (in Madison County) with U.S. Route 75/U.S. Route 77 (US 75/US 77) immediately west of Dakota City (in Dakota County). N-35 is maintained by the Nebraska Department of Transportation (NDOT) and serves as a connector between Norfolk and Sioux City, Iowa. For its entire length (except when it passes through the cities of Wayne and Wakefield) N-35 runs through rural agricultural land.

== Route description ==
=== Madison County ===
N-35 begins at an intersection with US 275 and N-24 in southeastern Norfolk in Madison County. (From the intersection US 275 heads east toward Wisner and Fremont and west toward Meadow Grove and Neligh. N-24 heads south, then south-east toward Stanton.) From its western terminus N-35 initially heads northerly as a four–lane divided highway along an old alignment of US 275 (and subsequently the former U.S. Route 273 Business loop [US 275 Bus]).

Just over one mile (1.6 km) north, N-35 reaches a roundabout. (From the roundabout, the former routing of US 275 [and the former US 275 Bus] head west along Norfolk Avenue through Norfolk to cross U.S. Route 81 [US 81] and then reconnect with US 275 on the western edge of town. North Victory Road heads north from the roundabout toward Northeast Community College.) From the roundabout, N-35 heads northeast (still as a four-lane divided highway) for roughly one and a half miles (2.4 km) before leaving Norfolk, immediately crossing 843rd Road (East Benjamin Avenue), and leaving Madison County to enter Stanton County.

=== Stanton County ===
About 1.8 miles (2.9 km) northeast, after entering Stanton County and passing along the northwestern edge of the unincorporated community of Woodland Park, N-35 connects with the west end of NE Industrial Drive and then narrows to a two-lane road. Approximately 2.1 miles (3.4 km) farther northeast, N-35 crosses 846th Road and leaves Stanton County to enter Wayne County. (N-35 does not have any major intersections within Stanton County.)

=== Wayne County ===
After continuing northeast for approximately 0.8 miles (1.3 km) in Wayne County, N-35 curves to head east along 847th Road and then immediately connects with the south end of Nebraska Spur 90A (S-90A) at a T intersection. (S-90A heads north for one-quarter mile [0.40 km] to the village of Hoskins.) After heading about 5.6 miles (9.0 km) along 847th Road, N-35 curves to head north along 567th Avenue for roughly 4.0 miles (6.4 km). N-35 then curves slightly to the north-northeast. Just under 1.0 mile (1.6 km) later, N-35 connects with the west end of Nebraska Spur 90B (S-90B) at 852nd Road. (S-90B heads east for 0.18 miles [0.29 km] to the village of Winside, while 852nd Road heads west toward US 81.)

Roughly 1.1 miles (1.8 km) north of S-90B, N-35 curves slightly to head north once again, this time along 568th Avenue. Three miles (4.8 km) farther north, N-35 connects with the west end of Nebraska Highway 98 (N-98) at a T intersection on 856th Road. (From the intersection, N-989 heads west toward Nebraska Highway 57, US 81, and Pierce.) From its junction with N-98, N-35 heads east along 856th Road and for 7.0 miles (11.3 km) before reaching 575th Avenue. At 575th Avenue N-35 enters the city of Wayne, widens to three lanes (with center left-turn lane), and continues through Wayne along 7th Street. After 1 mile (1.6 km), and after passing along the southern edge of the Greenwood Cemetery, N-35 reaches Nebraska Highway 15 (N-15/Main Street) at the center of Wayne. (N-15 heads north toward Laurel and Hartington, and then Yankton in South Dakota. N-15 heads south toward Norfolk and Fremont.)

East of N-15, N-35 continues east along 7th Street for one mile (1.6 km) before leaving Wayne (at roughly 755th Avenue). After leaving Wayne, N-35 continues east along 856th Road and promptly narrows back to a two-lane road and passes just south of the Wayne Municipal Airport (Stan Morris Field). Seven miles (11 km) after leaving Wayne, N-35 connects with the north end of Nebraska Highway 16 (N-16) at 584th Avenue. (N-16 heads south from the intersection toward Pender and 856th Road continues east as a gravel road toward Nebraska Highway 9 [N-9].) From its junction with N-16, N-35 heads north along 584th Avenue for about 1.7 miles (2.7 km) before entering the city of Wakefield along Oak Street. Several blocks into Wakefield (at 858th Road) N-35 leaves Wayne County and enters Dixon County.

=== Dixon County ===
After continuing north for about 0.6 miles (0.97 km) along Oak Street within Wakefield (but now in Dixon County), N-35 leaves Wakefield and promptly crosses over the Logan Creek Dredge. Roughly 1.4 miles (2.3 km) north of Wakfield, N-35 reaches its western junction with N-9 at 860th Road. (From that intersection N-9 heads north along 584th Avenue toward Allen and Ponca, while 860th Avenue heads west toward N-15.) Heading east along 860th Avenue (concurrent with N-9) for 7 miles (11 km) N-35 reaches its eastern junction with N-9 at 591st Avenue and the Dakota County line. (N-9 head south from the intersection along 591st Avenue to quickly pass through Emerson and then on toward Pender, while 591st Avenue heads north as a dirt road toward Waterbury.)

=== Dakota County ===
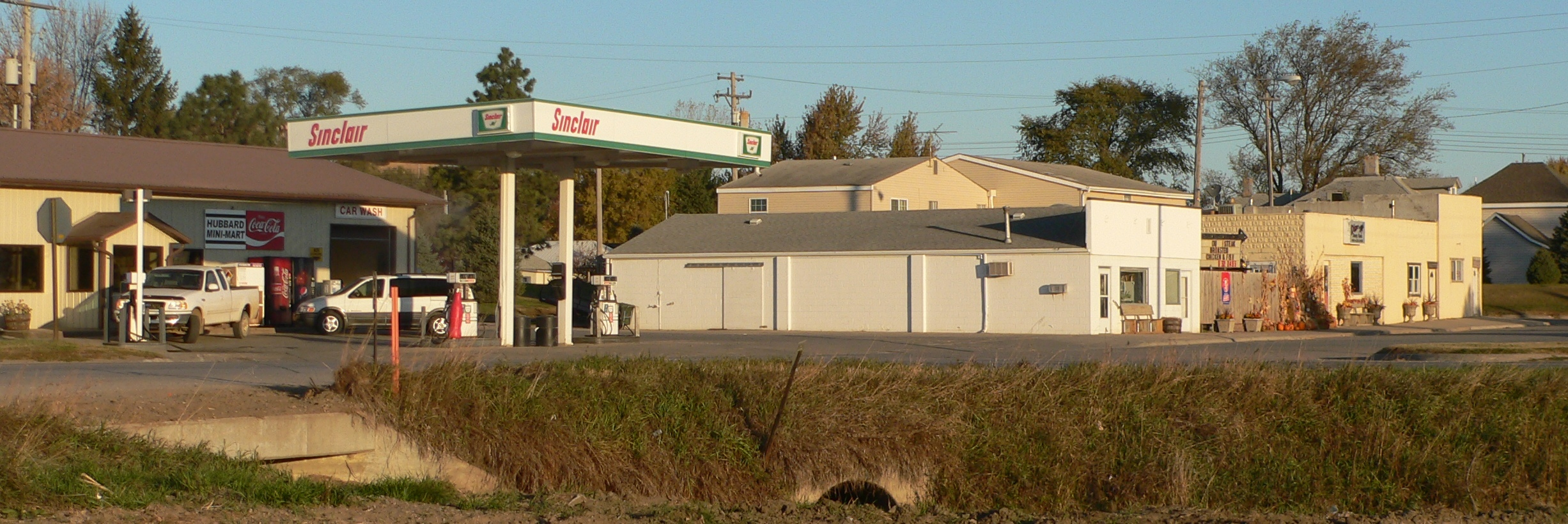
Sinclair gas station along N-35 in Hubbard, October 2011

After continuing east for about one and a half miles (2.4 km), but now along 260th Street and in Dakota County, N-35 begins a somewhat winding northeasterly course. After approximately 9.3 miles (15.0 km) N-35 passes northeast through the southern part of the village of Hubbard. About 1.8 miles (2.9 km) northeast of Hubbard, N-35 briefly resumes heading east along 185th Road. However, about 2.3 miles (3.7 km) east, N-35 briefly heads northeast before resuming its eastern course, but now along 175th Avenue. After roughly one-half mile (0.80 km) N-35 reaches the southern end of Nebraska Highway 110 (N-110) at G Avenue. (N-110 heads north along G Avenue toward Jackson, but ends at U.S. Route 20 after only 2.26 miles [3.64 km]. G Avenue heads south toward Homer.) Two and a half miles (4.0 km) east of its junction with N-110, N-35 reaches its eastern terminus at US 75/US 77 immediately west of the city of Dakota City. (From that intersection US 75/US 77 heads north to pass through South Sioux City and then on toward Sioux City in Iowa. US 75/US 77 heads south toward Homer and Fremont. From the western terminus of N-35, the road continues east as Broadway Street into Dakota City.)

== History ==
N-35 was established in 1926.

== Major intersections ==
County	Location	mi	km	Destinations	Notes
Madison	Norfolk	0.00	0.00	N-24 east – Stanton	Continuation south from western terminus
Madison	Norfolk	0.00	0.00	US 275 east (841st Road/East Omaha Road) – Wisner, Fremont US 275 west (841st Road/East Omaha Road) – Meadow Grove, Neligh	Western terminus; Western end of former US 275 Bus
Madison	Norfolk	1.10	1.77	East Norfolk Avenue – US 81, US 275; North Victory Road north – Northeast Community College	East Norfolk Avenue is the routing of former US 275 Bus
Stanton	No major junctions				
Wayne		7.85	12.63	S-90A north (South Main Street) – Hoskins	T intersection; South end of S-90A
Wayne		18.63	29.98	S-90B east (852nd Road) – Winside; 852nd Road west – US 81	West end of S-90B
Wayne		22.77	36.64	N-98 west (856th Road) – N-57, US 81, Pierce	T intersection; East end of N-98
Wayne	Wayne	30.76	49.50	N-15 north (Main Street) – Laurel, Hartington, Yankton (South Dakota) N-15 south (Main Street) – Norfolk, Fremont	
Wayne		38.75	62.36	N-16 south (584th Avenue) – Pender; 856th Road east – N-9	; North end of N-16
Dixon		42.74	68.78	N-9 north – Allen, Ponca; 860th Road west – N-15	Western end of N-9 concurrency
Dixon–Dakota county line		49.69	79.97	N-9 south (591st Avenue) – Emerson, Pender; 591st Avenue north – Waterbury	Eastern end of N-9 concurrency
Dakota		66.95	107.75	N-110 north – US 20, Jackson; G Avenue south – Homer	South end of N-110
Dakota		69.51	111.87	US 75 north / US 77 north – South Sioux City, Sioux City (Iowa) US 75 south / US 77 south – Homer, Fremont	Eastern terminus
Dakota		69.51	111.87	Broadway Street east – Dakota City	Continuation east from eastern teriminus
1.000 mi = 1.609 km; 1.000 km = 0.621 mi: Concurrency terminus

== See also ==
- List of state highways in Nebraska
