= Hoskins (disambiguation) =

Hoskins is a surname.

Hoskins may also refer to:

== United States ==
- Hoskins, Kansas, a ghost town
- Hoskins, Nebraska, a village
- Fort Hoskins, Oregon, a US Army fort completed in 1857
- Hoskins Field (Texas), a baseball field
- Hoskins Field (Washington), a private airport

== Papua New Guinea ==
- Hoskins Rural LLG
  - Hoskins, Papua New Guinea
  - Hoskins Airport
- Cape Hoskins, Papua New Guinea

== Antarctica ==
- Hoskins Peak, Graham Land
- Mount Hoskins, Oates Land

== See also ==
- Hoskins effect, in immunology
- Haskins (disambiguation)
