= Nebraska Highway 9 =

State highway in Nebraska, U.S.

State Highway 9

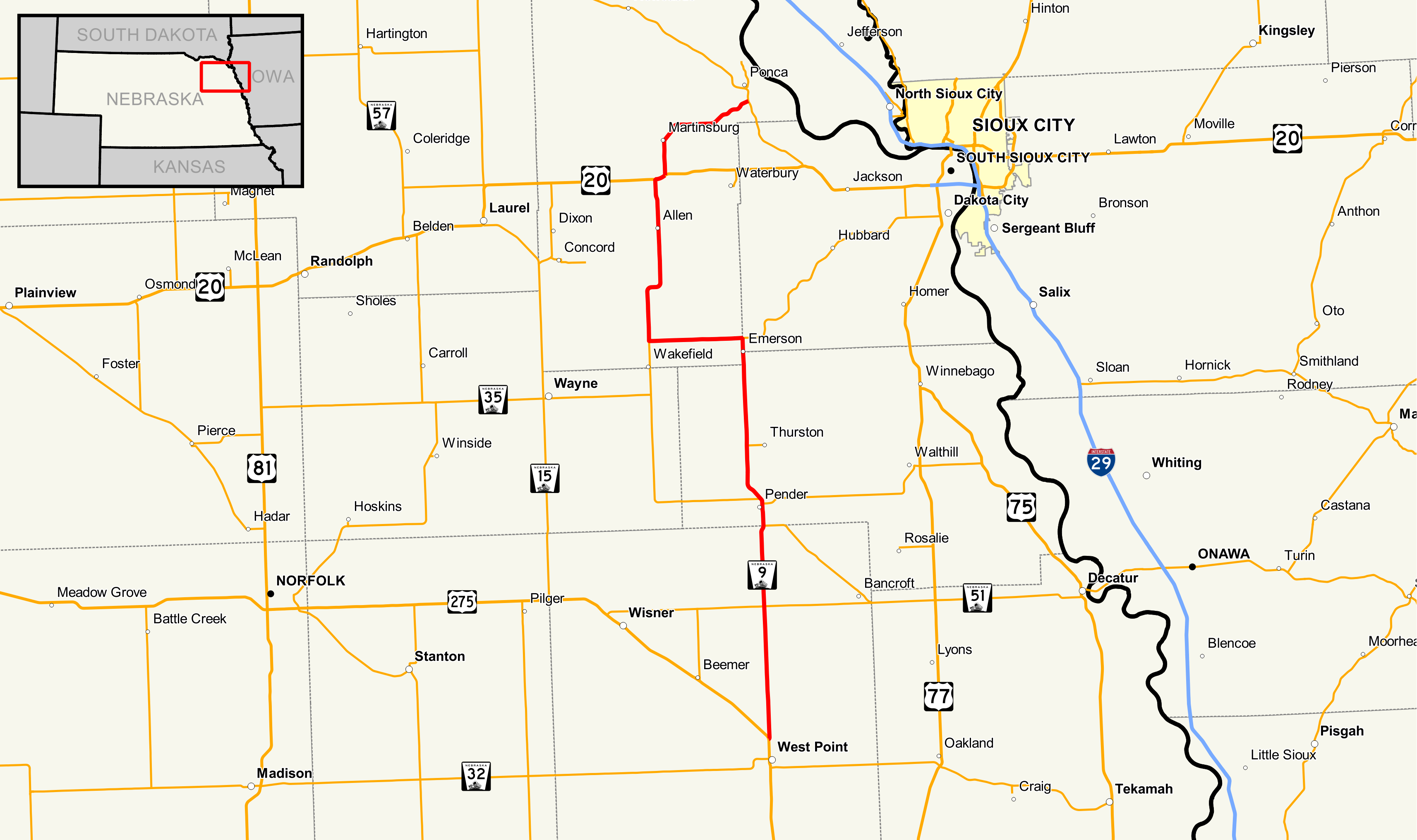
- Nebraska Highway 9 highlighted in red

Route information
- Maintained by NDOT
- Length: 60.83 mi (97.90 km)
- Existed: 1922–present

Major junctions
- South end: US 275 north of West Point
- N-35 north of Emerson; US 20 south of Martinsburg
- North end: N-12 south of Ponca

Location
- Country: United States
- State: Nebraska
- Counties: Cuming, Thurston, Dakota, Dixon

Highway system
- Nebraska State Highway System; Interstate; US; State; Link; Spur; State Spurs; Recreation
← N-8	→ N-10

Nebraska Highway 9 is a highway in northeastern Nebraska. The southern terminus is located just north of West Point at an intersection with U.S. Highway 275. Its northern terminus is at an intersection with Nebraska Highway 12 just south of Ponca.

== Route description ==
Nebraska Highway 9 heads due north into farmland from its intersection with U.S. Highway 275 while US 275 turns northwest just north of West Point, Nebraska. After passing Nebraska Highway 51, it continues north and just before reaching Pender, meets and overlaps Nebraska Highway 16. NE 16 separates just north of Pender, and the highway proceeds through the Omaha Indian Reservation and the Winnebago Indian Reservation. It continues north through Emerson, meets Nebraska Highway 35, and turns west with NE 35.

North of Wakefield, NE 9 turns north again and goes through Allen before meeting with U.S. Highway 20. It turns east for a mile with US 20, then turns north again. It goes north through Martinsburg, then turns east and northeast to end just south of Ponca.

== Major intersections ==
County	Location	mi	km	Destinations	Notes
Cuming	West Point	0.000	0.000	US 275 (17th Road)	
Cuming		9.90	15.93	N-51 (S Road)	
Cuming		15.92	25.62	N-16 south	South end of NE 16 overlap
Thurston	Pender	17.57	28.28	N-94 east (Main Street)	
Thurston	Pender	17.99	28.95	N-16 north	North end of NE 16 overlap
Thurston	Thurston	22.32	35.92	S-87A east	
Dixon		30.33	48.81	N-35 east (260th Street)	South end of NE 35 overlap
Dixon	Wakefield	37.28	60.00	N-35 west	North end of NE 35 overlap
Dixon		50.00	80.47	US 20 west (872 Road)	South end of US 20 overlap
Dixon		50.81	81.77	US 20 east	North end of US 20 overlap
Dixon	Ponca	60.83	97.90	N-12	
1.000 mi = 1.609 km; 1.000 km = 0.621 mi: Concurrency terminus

== See also ==
- List of state highways in Nebraska
