= Nebraska Highway 57 =

State highway in Nebraska, U.S.

State Highway 57

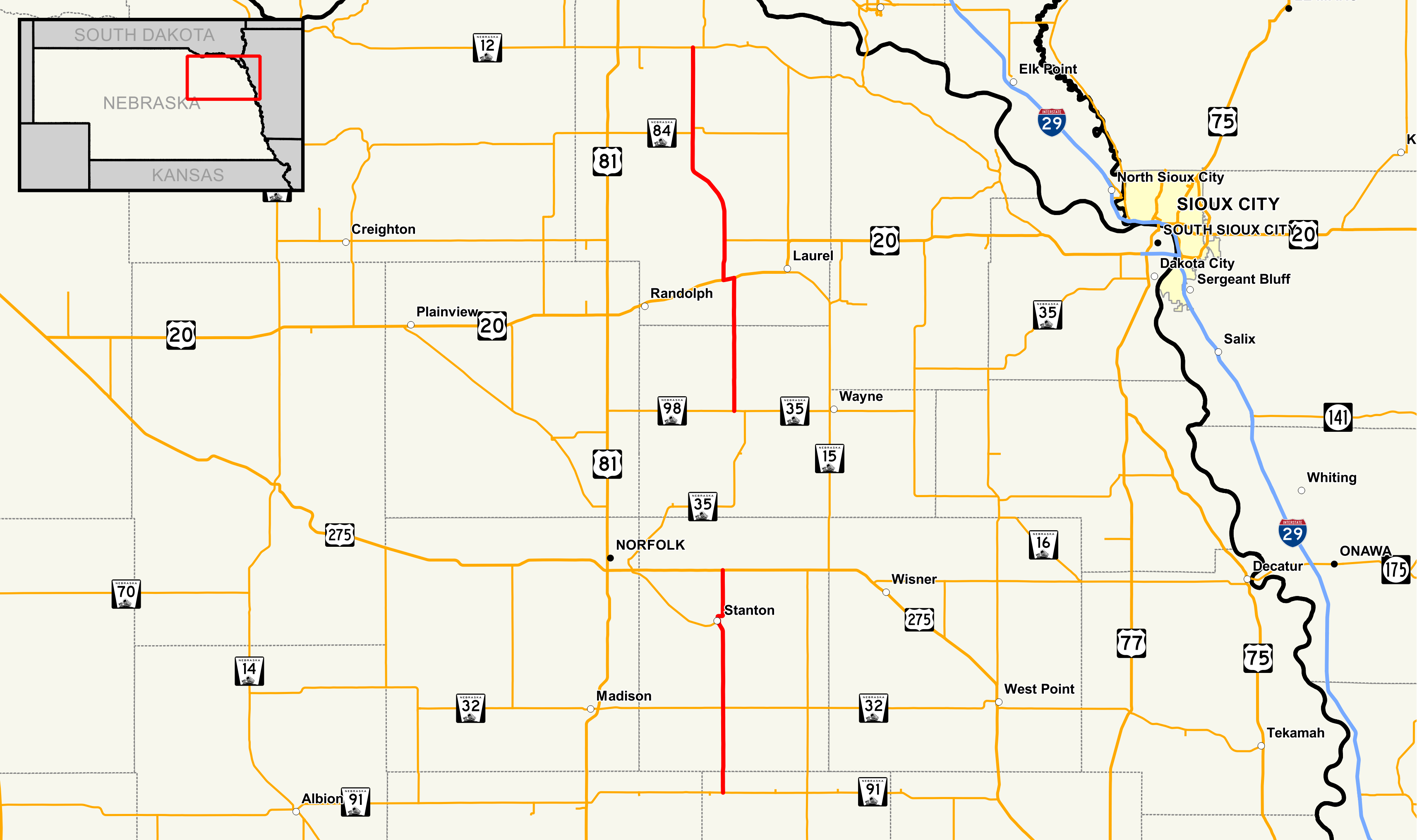
- Nebraska Highway 57 highlighted in red

Route information
- Maintained by NDOT
- Length: 58.17 mi (93.62 km)

Southern segment
- Length: 21.73 mi (34.97 km)
- South end: N-91 near Leigh
- Major intersections: N-32 south of Stanton; N-24 in Stanton
- North end: US 275 north of Stanton

Eastern segment
- Length: 36.44 mi (58.64 km)
- South end: N-98 south of Carroll
- Major intersections: US 20 in Belden; N-84 in Hartington
- North end: N-12 north of Hartington

Location
- Country: United States
- State: Nebraska
- Counties: Southern segment: Colfax, Stanton; Northern segment: Wayne, Cedar

Highway system
- Nebraska State Highway System; Interstate; US; State; Link; Spur; State Spurs; Recreation
← N-56	→ N-58

Nebraska Highway 57 (N-57) is a highway in northeastern Nebraska, United States. It is divided into two segments, which combine for a length of 58 miles (93 km). The southern segment begins northeast of Leigh at N-91 and ends at U.S. Highway 275 north of Stanton. The northern segment begins south of Carroll at N-98 and ends north of Hartington at an intersection with N-12.

== Route description ==
=== Southern segment ===
The southern segment of N-57 begins northeast of Leigh at N-91. It goes north through farmland and meets N-32 before entering Stanton. While in Stanton, it intersects N-24. It continues north from Stanton and ends at U.S. 275.

=== Northern segment ===
The northern segment of N-57 begins south of Carroll at N-98, one mile (1.6 km) west of N-98's intersection with N-35. It goes north into farmland, through Carroll, and meets U.S. Highway 20 east of Belden. It turns west with U.S. 20 to enter Belden, then turns north. Before entering Coleridge, it meets N-59. It leaves Coleridge going northwest, then turns north again before meeting N-84. N-57 and N-84 run concurrent through Hartington, where N-84 separates. N-57 continues straight north out of Hartington and ends at an intersection with N-12.

== History ==
Prior to November 2001, the current segment of N-57 north of its present junction with N-59 was a part of N-15. The old route for N-57 went east from its current intersection with Highway 59, then turned north at what is now the intersection of U.S. 20, N-59 and N-15 north of Laurel. The highway then went north and ended at N-12. In November 2001, the routes for Highway 57 and Highway 15 were swapped so N-15 could align with the Vermillion-Newcastle Bridge, which opened that month. The east–west segment which carried both of those highways then became Highway 59.

== Major intersections ==
County	Location	mi	km	Destinations	Notes
Colfax		0.00	0.00	N-91 (Road W)	Southern end of southern segment
Stanton		8.04	12.94	N-32 (828th Road)	
Stanton	Stanton	16.56	26.65	N-24 west (10th Street)	
Stanton		21.73	34.97	US 275 (841st Road)	Northern end of southern segment
Gap in route
Wayne		37.73	60.72	N-98 (856th Road)	Southern end of northern segment
Cedar	Belden	50.23	80.84	US 20 east	Southern end of US 20 overlap
Cedar	Belden	51.25	82.48	US 20 west	Northern end of US 20 overlap
Cedar		54.99	88.50	N-59 east (872nd Road)	
Cedar	Hartington	66.19	106.52	N-84 west (882nd Road)	Southern end of N-84 overlap
Cedar	Hartington	66.67	107.29	N-84 east (West Franklin Street)	Northern end of N-84 overlap
Cedar		74.17	119.37	N-12 (890th Road)	Northern end of northern segment
1.000 mi = 1.609 km; 1.000 km = 0.621 mi: Concurrency terminus

== See also ==
- List of state highways in Nebraska
