= Nebraska Highway 16 =

State highway in Nebraska, U.S.

State Highway 16

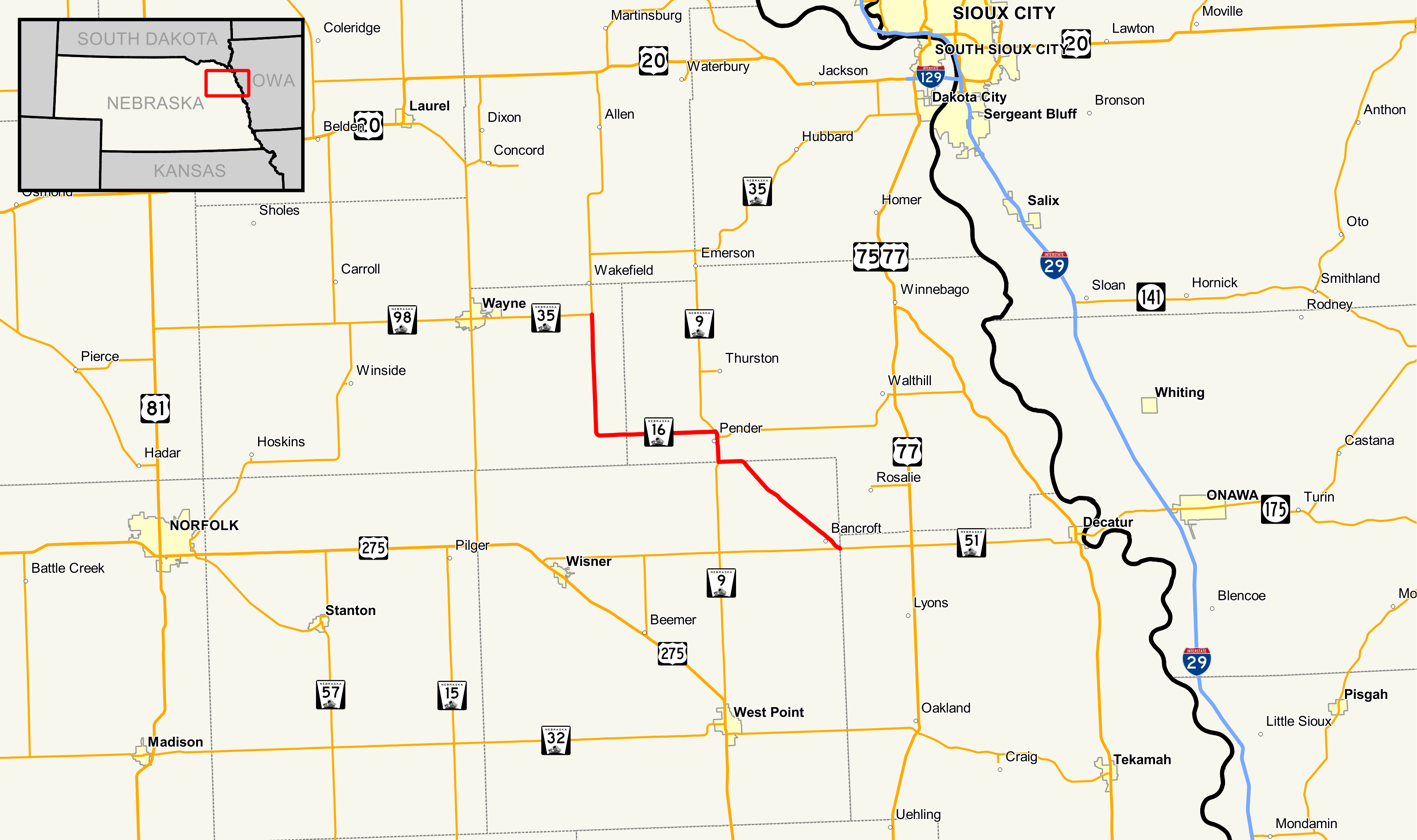
- Nebraska Highway 16 highlighted in red

Route information
- Maintained by NDOT
- Length: 28.15 mi (45.30 km)
- Existed: 1936–present

Major junctions
- South end: N-51 southeast of Bancroft
- N-9 south of Pender
- North end: N-35 south of Wakefield

Location
- Country: United States
- State: Nebraska
- Counties: Cuming, Thurston, Wayne

Highway system
- Nebraska State Highway System; Interstate; US; State; Link; Spur; State Spurs; Recreation
← N-15	→ N-17

Nebraska Highway 16 is a highway in northeastern Nebraska. Its southern terminus is southeast of Bancroft at an intersection with NE 51. Its northern terminus is at NE 35 south of Wakefield.

== Route description ==
Nebraska Highway 16 begins at an intersection with NE 51 and NE 1 just southeast of Bancroft. It heads in a northwesterly direction, intersecting NE 9 south of Pender. It turns northward, running concurrently with NE 9 before splitting off to the west just north of Pender. It continues westward before turning to the north. It ends at an intersection with NE 35 south of Wakefield.

== History ==
The original Nebraska Highway 16 went from North Platte to Omaha on an alignment which follows current U.S. Highway 83 from North Platte to Stapleton and Nebraska Highway 92 from Stapleton east to Omaha. The original designation of the current Nebraska Highway 16 was Nebraska Highway 92, but in 1936, the two highway numbers were swapped.

== Major intersections ==
County	Location	mi	km	Destinations	Notes
Cuming		0.00	0.00	N-51 – Wisner, Decatur	Southern terminus
Cuming		10.29	16.56	N-9 south – West Point	Southern end of N-9 concurrency
Thurston	Pender	11.94	19.22	N-94 east (Main Street) – Walthill	Western terminus of N-94
Thurston		12.36	19.89	N-9 north – Emerson	Northern end of N-9 concurrency
Wayne		28.15	45.30	N-35 – Wayne, Wakefield	Northern terminus
1.000 mi = 1.609 km; 1.000 km = 0.621 mi: Concurrency terminus
