= Nebraska Highway 24 =

State highway in Nebraska, U.S.

State Highway 24
- N-24 highlighted in red

Route information
- Maintained by NDOT
- Length: 10.38 mi (16.70 km)

Major junctions
- Northwest end: US 275 / N-35 in Norfolk
- Southeast end: N-57 in Stanton

Location
- Country: United States
- State: Nebraska
- Counties: Madison, Stanton

Highway system
- Nebraska State Highway System; Interstate; US; State; Link; Spur; State Spurs; Recreation
← N-23	→ N-25

Nebraska Highway 24 is a highway in northeastern Nebraska. It runs for 10.38 miles (16.70 km). The western terminus is at U.S. Highway 275 and Nebraska Highway 35 in Norfolk and its eastern terminus is at Nebraska Highway 57 in Stanton.

== Route description ==
Nebraska Highway 24 begins in the southeastern part of Norfolk at U.S. Highway 275. This intersection is also the western terminus of Nebraska Highway 35. It goes southeast on a route which parallels the Elkhorn River towards Stanton. In Stanton, the highway meets Nebraska Highway 57 and ends.

== Major intersections ==
County	Location	mi	km	Destinations	Notes
Madison	Norfolk	0.00	0.00	US 275 (841st Road) / N-35 east (Channel Road)	Western terminus
Stanton	Stanton	10.38	16.70	N-57 (10th Street/Ivy Street)	Eastern terminus
1.000 mi = 1.609 km; 1.000 km = 0.621 mi
