= Haskin =

Haskin may refer to:

- Haskin (crater), lunar impact crater
- Haskin (surname)
- Haskin Smith (fl. 1872–1876), American politician

== See also ==
- Haskins (disambiguation)
