= Hoskins Field =

Hoskins Field may refer to one of the following:

- Hoskins Field (Texas), a baseball field
- Hoskins Field (Washington), a private airport
