= Haskins =

Haskins may refer to:

- Haskins (surname)
- Haskins, Iowa, U.S.
- Haskins, Ohio, U.S.
- Haskins Laboratories, non-profit researcher

== See also ==
- Haskin (disambiguation)
- Hoskins (disambiguation)
