= Wayne County, Nebraska =

County in Nebraska, United States

- County
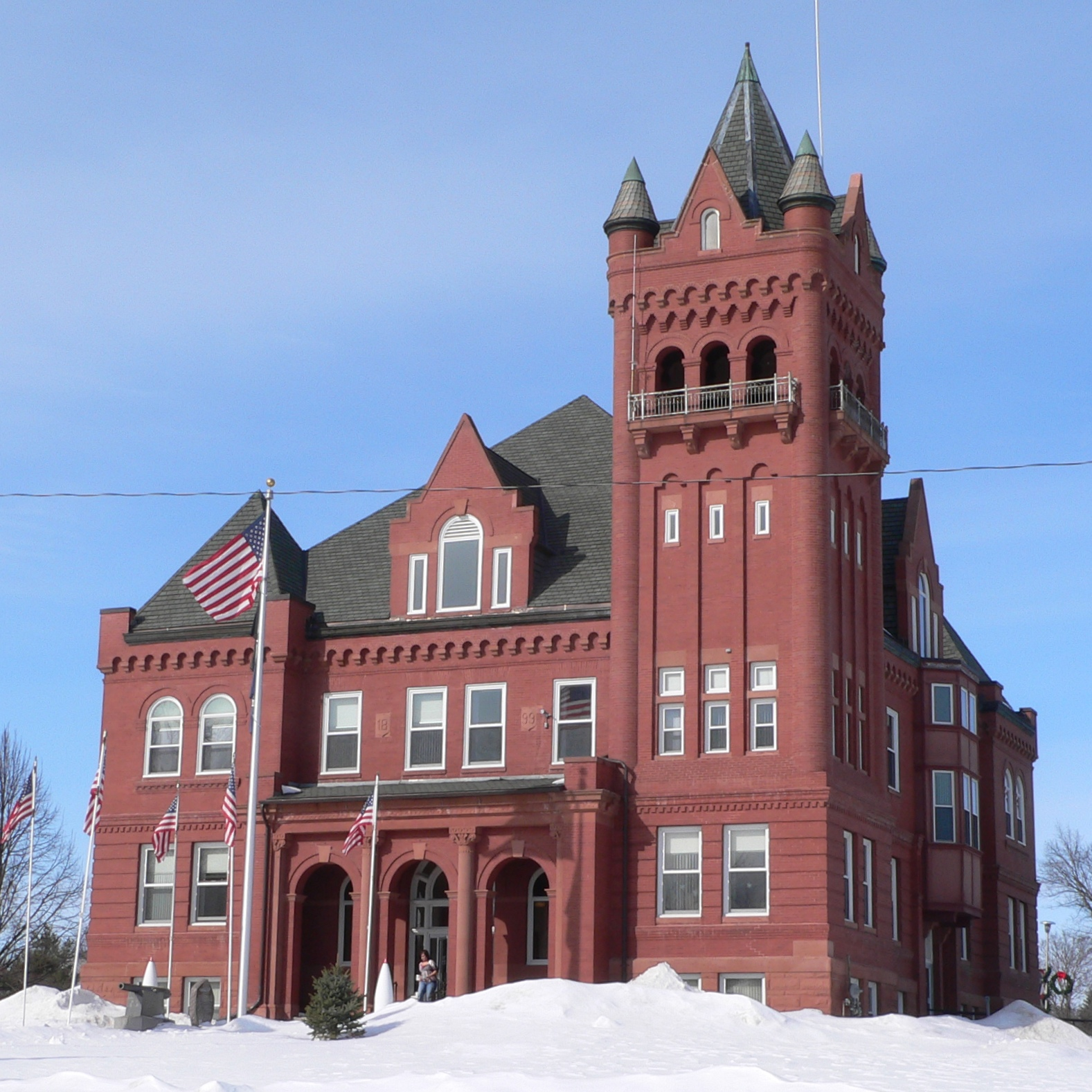
- Wayne County Courthouse in Wayne

- Location within the U.S. state of Nebraska
- Coordinates: 42°13′N 97°07′W
- Country: United States
- State: Nebraska
- Founded: 1870
- Named for: Anthony Wayne
- Seat: Wayne
- Largest city: Wayne

Area
  - Total: 443 sq mi (1,150 km^{2})
  - Land: 443 sq mi (1,150 km^{2})
  - Water: 0.4 sq mi (1.0 km^{2}) 0.09%

Population (2020)
  - Total: 9,697
  - Estimate (2025): 10,020 ▲
  - Density: 21.9/sq mi (8.45/km^{2})
- Time zone: UTC−6 (Central)
  - Summer (DST): UTC−5 (CDT)
- Congressional district: 3rd
- Website: www.waynecountyne.gov

Wayne County is a county in the U.S. state of Nebraska. As of the 2020 census, the population was 9,697. Its county seat is Wayne.

In the Nebraska license plate system, Wayne County is represented by the prefix 27 (it had the 27th-largest number of vehicles registered in the state when the license plate system was established in 1922).

== History ==
Wayne County was organized by a proclamation of Governor David Butler in the fall of 1870. As the county was settled, precincts were formed and boundaries defined. Precincts were named for officials, early settlers, and neighborhood creeks. There are 13 precincts in Wayne County.

Wayne County, like the City of Wayne, was named for Revolutionary War General Anthony Wayne.

== Geography ==
The terrain of Wayne County consists of low rolling hills; mostly devoted to agriculture. The ground slopes to the east-northeast. A small drainage, South Logan Creek, flows east-northeastward through the central part of the county and exits flowing northeastward.

The county has a total area of 443 square miles (1,150 km^{2}), of which 443 square miles (1,150 km^{2}) is land and 0.4 square miles (1.0 km^{2}) (0.09%) is water.

=== Major highways ===
- Nebraska Highway 15
- Nebraska Highway 16
- Nebraska Highway 35
- Nebraska Highway 57
- Nebraska Highway 98

=== Adjacent counties ===
- Dixon County – northeast
- Thurston County – east
- Cuming County – southeast
- Stanton County – south
- Madison County – southwest
- Pierce County – west
- Cedar County – north

=== Protected areas ===
- Sioux Strip State Wildlife Management Area

== Demographics ==
Historical population
Census	Pop.	Note	%±
1870	182		—
1880	813		346.7%
1890	6,189		661.3%
1900	9,862		59.3%
1910	10,397		5.4%
1920	9,725		−6.5%
1930	10,566		8.6%
1940	9,880		−6.5%
1950	10,129		2.5%
1960	9,959		−1.7%
1970	10,400		4.4%
1980	9,858		−5.2%
1990	9,364		−5.0%
2000	9,851		5.2%
2010	9,595		−2.6%
2020	9,697		1.1%
2025 (est.)	10,020	▲	3.3%
US Decennial Census; 1790-1960 1900-1990; 1990-2000 2010 2020 2022

=== 2020 census ===
As of the 2020 census, the county had a population of 9,697. The median age was 29.7 years. 20.2% of residents were under the age of 18 and 14.8% of residents were 65 years of age or older. For every 100 females there were 101.1 males, and for every 100 females age 18 and over there were 100.2 males age 18 and over.

The racial makeup of the county was 82.7% White, 3.6% Black or African American, 0.6% American Indian and Alaska Native, 1.3% Asian, 0.1% Native Hawaiian and Pacific Islander, 6.7% from some other race, and 5.0% from two or more races. Hispanic or Latino residents of any race comprised 10.2% of the population.

61.7% of residents lived in urban areas, while 38.3% lived in rural areas.

There were 3,524 households in the county, of which 26.8% had children under the age of 18 living with them and 22.6% had a female householder with no spouse or partner present. About 30.1% of all households were made up of individuals and 12.1% had someone living alone who was 65 years of age or older.

There were 3,950 housing units, of which 10.8% were vacant. Among occupied housing units, 64.1% were owner-occupied and 35.9% were renter-occupied. The homeowner vacancy rate was 1.3% and the rental vacancy rate was 13.0%.

=== 2000 census ===
As of the 2000 United States census there were 9,851 people, 3,437 households, and 2,206 families in the county. The population density was 22 people per square mile (8.5 people/km^{2}). There were 3,662 housing units at an average density of 8 units per square mile (3.1/km^{2}).

The racial makeup of the county was 96.78% White, 0.94% Black or African American, 0.35% Native American, 0.35% Asian, 0.01% Pacific Islander, 0.85% from other races, and 0.72% from two or more races. 1.48% of the population were Hispanic or Latino of any race. 57.5% were of German, 6.0% Irish and 5.9% Swedish ancestry.

There were 3,437 households, out of which 30.50% had children under the age of 18 living with them, 56.20% were married couples living together, 5.40% had a female householder with no husband present, and 35.80% were non-families. 25.10% of all households were made up of individuals, and 10.60% had someone living alone who was 65 years of age or older. The average household size was 2.51 and the average family size was 3.02.

The county population contains 21.60% under the age of 18, 25.40% from 18 to 24, 21.20% from 25 to 44, 18.00% from 45 to 64, and 13.70% who were 65 years of age or older. The median age was 28 years. For every 100 females there were 92.30 males. For every 100 females age 18 and over, there were 92.30 males.

The median income for a household in the county was $32,366, and the median income for a family was $43,840. Males had a median income of $27,848 versus $20,376 for females. The per capita income for the county was $14,644. About 7.40% of families and 14.50% of the population were below the poverty line, including 10.60% of those under age 18 and 7.20% of those age 65 or over.

== Communities ==
=== Cities ===
- Wakefield (partial)
- Wayne (county seat)

=== Villages ===
- Carroll
- Hoskins
- Sholes
- Winside

=== Unincorporated community ===
- Altona

Several towns in Wayne County's early history no longer exist. LaPorte had nearly 300 citizens at one time and was home to a temporary courthouse until the railroad chose a different route. Towns such as Taffe, Logan City, Apex, Melvin, Weber and Spring Branch no longer exist.

=== Precincts ===
There are 13 precincts in Wayne County. They were named for officials, early settlers or neighborhood creeks.

- Brenna - named for the sister of F.E. Moses, the first settler in the precinct.
- Chapin - named for early settler Arthur T. Chapin.
- Deer Creek - named for the deer horns found on the prairies in early days.
- Garfield - named for US President James A. Garfield.
- Hancock - named for Civil War Brigadier General Winfield Scott Hancock.
- Hoskins - first named Spring Branch; later named for Mr. Hoskins who was secretary for Mr. Peavy, a member of the land company that laid out the village of Hoskins.
- Hunter - named for early settler Cyrus E. Hunter, from Lee County IL.
- Logan - probably named for John A. Logan, the vice presidential candidate with presidential candidate James G. Blaine.
- Leslie - either named for a pinoeer-days judge, or for a post office.
- Plum Creek - named for wild plums seen along the creek in early days.
- Sherman - named for Civil War General.
- Strahan - named for J.M. Strahan, an early settler.
- Wilbur - named for Russell H. Wilbur, a pioneer in the precinct.

== Education ==
School districts include:

- Laurel-Concord-Coleridge School
- Norfolk Public Schools
- Pender Public Schools
- Pierce Public Schools
- Randolph Public Schools
- Wakefield Public Schools
- Wayne Community Schools
- Winside Public Schools
- Wisner-Pilger Public Schools

== Politics ==
Wayne County voters have been strongly Republican for many decades, voting for the Republican candidate in every presidential election except for three from 1900 onward. In addition, no Democratic presidential candidate has won the county since 1936.

United States presidential election results for Wayne County, Nebraska
Year	Republican		Democratic		Third party(ies)	
Year	No.	%	No.	%	No.	%
1900	1,246	56.18%	951	42.88%	21	0.95%
1904	1,453	68.25%	549	25.79%	127	5.97%
1908	1,297	54.38%	1,055	44.23%	33	1.38%
1912	600	27.80%	808	37.44%	750	34.75%
1916	1,208	53.26%	1,006	44.36%	54	2.38%
1920	2,312	74.46%	681	21.93%	112	3.61%
1924	1,840	52.50%	775	22.11%	890	25.39%
1928	2,354	64.88%	1,235	34.04%	39	1.07%
1932	1,455	35.03%	2,608	62.78%	91	2.19%
1936	2,149	47.26%	2,322	51.07%	76	1.67%
1940	3,209	69.70%	1,395	30.30%	0	0.00%
1944	2,886	73.87%	1,021	26.13%	0	0.00%
1948	2,323	66.73%	1,158	33.27%	0	0.00%
1952	3,338	79.40%	866	20.60%	0	0.00%
1956	3,040	72.68%	1,143	27.32%	0	0.00%
1960	3,274	76.16%	1,025	23.84%	0	0.00%
1964	2,359	59.14%	1,630	40.86%	0	0.00%
1968	2,582	72.53%	786	22.08%	192	5.39%
1972	2,659	74.67%	902	25.33%	0	0.00%
1976	2,521	67.99%	1,089	29.37%	98	2.64%
1980	2,844	72.53%	733	18.69%	344	8.77%
1984	3,075	78.13%	833	21.16%	28	0.71%
1988	2,473	68.43%	1,111	30.74%	30	0.83%
1992	2,122	51.73%	921	22.45%	1,059	25.82%
1996	2,150	58.49%	1,048	28.51%	478	13.00%
2000	2,774	70.41%	1,001	25.41%	165	4.19%
2004	2,971	72.73%	1,059	25.92%	55	1.35%
2008	2,503	65.73%	1,249	32.80%	56	1.47%
2012	2,493	67.71%	1,074	29.17%	115	3.12%
2016	2,693	71.32%	835	22.11%	248	6.57%
2020	3,055	72.43%	1,022	24.23%	141	3.34%
2024	3,011	73.33%	1,006	24.50%	89	2.17%

== See also ==
- National Register of Historic Places listings in Wayne County, Nebraska
