= Nebraska Highway 110 =

State highway in Nebraska, U.S.

State Highway 110

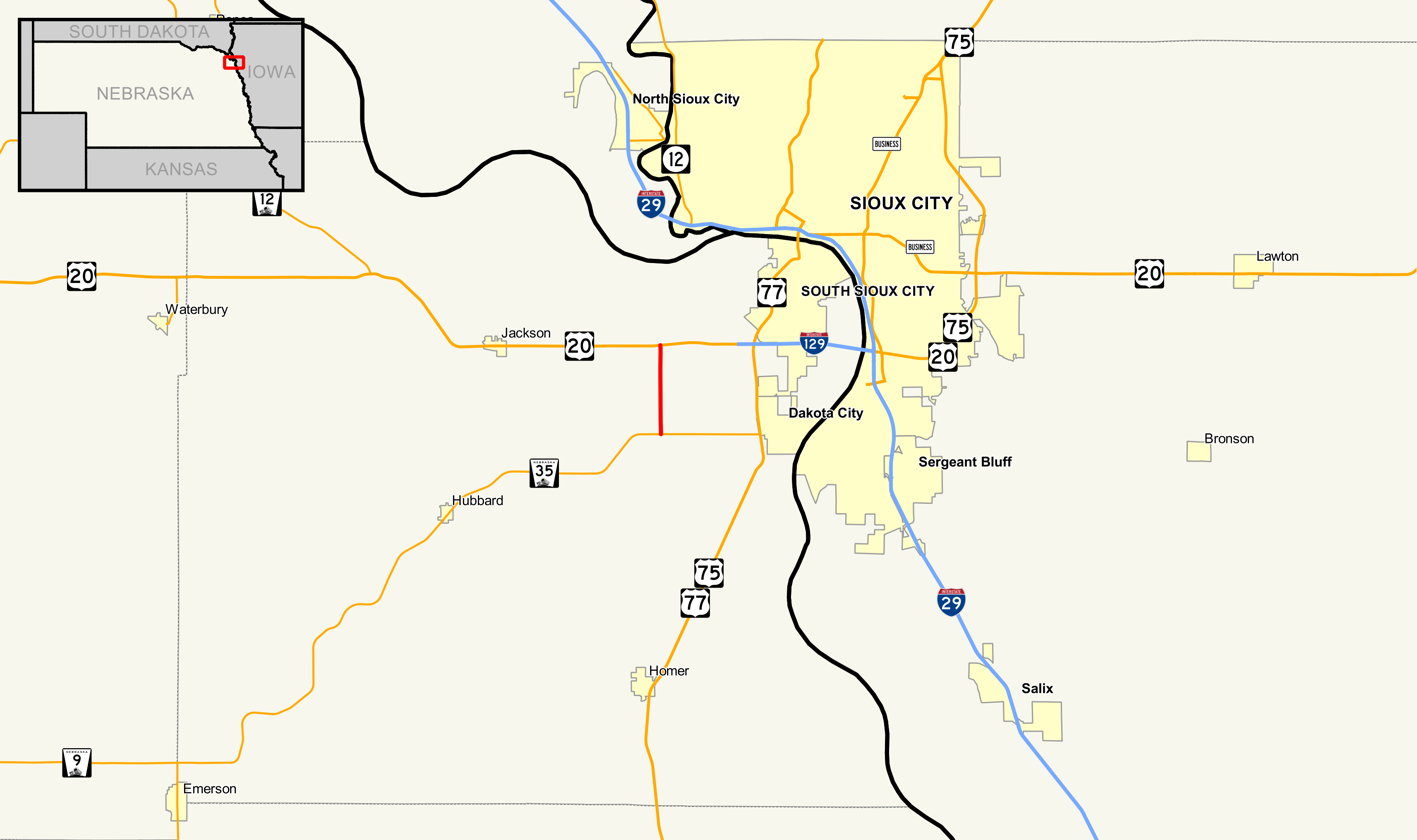
- Nebraska Highway 110 highlighted in red

Route information
- Maintained by NDOT
- Length: 2.26 mi (3.64 km)
- Existed: 1936–present

Major junctions
- South end: N-35 west of Dakota City
- North end: US 20 west of South Sioux City

Location
- Country: United States
- State: Nebraska
- Counties: Dakota

Highway system
- Nebraska State Highway System; Interstate; US; State; Link; Spur; State Spurs; Recreation
| ← N-109 | → N-112 |

Nebraska Highway 110 is a highway in northeastern Nebraska. Its southern terminus is at Nebraska Highway 35 west of Dakota City, and its northern terminus is at U.S. Highway 20 west of South Sioux City.

== Route description ==
Nebraska Highway 110 begins at an intersection with NE 35 west of Dakota City. The route heads directly northward through farmland for its short route of 2.26 miles (3.64 km), crossing a BNSF Railway line along the way. N-110 terminates at an intersection with US 20.

== Major intersections ==
The entire route is in Dakota County.

| Location | mi | km | Destinations | Notes |
|---|---|---|---|---|
| Dakota City | 0.00 | 0.00 | N-35 | Southern terminus |
| South Sioux City | 2.26 | 3.64 | US 20 | Northern terminus |
1.000 mi = 1.609 km; 1.000 km = 0.621 mi
