= Hoskins Peak =

Mountain in Antarctica

Hoskins Peak (67°46′S 67°36′W) is a peak 3 nautical miles (6 km) west of Contact Peak in southern Pourquoi Pas Island, Graham Land, Antarctica. It was mapped by the Falkland Islands Dependencies Survey (FIDS) from surveys, 1956–59, and named by the UK Antarctic Place-Names Committee for Arthur K. Hoskins, a FIDS geologist at Stonington Island in 1958 and Horseshoe Island in 1959.
