= Nebraska Highway 98 =

State highway in Nebraska, U.S.

State Highway 98

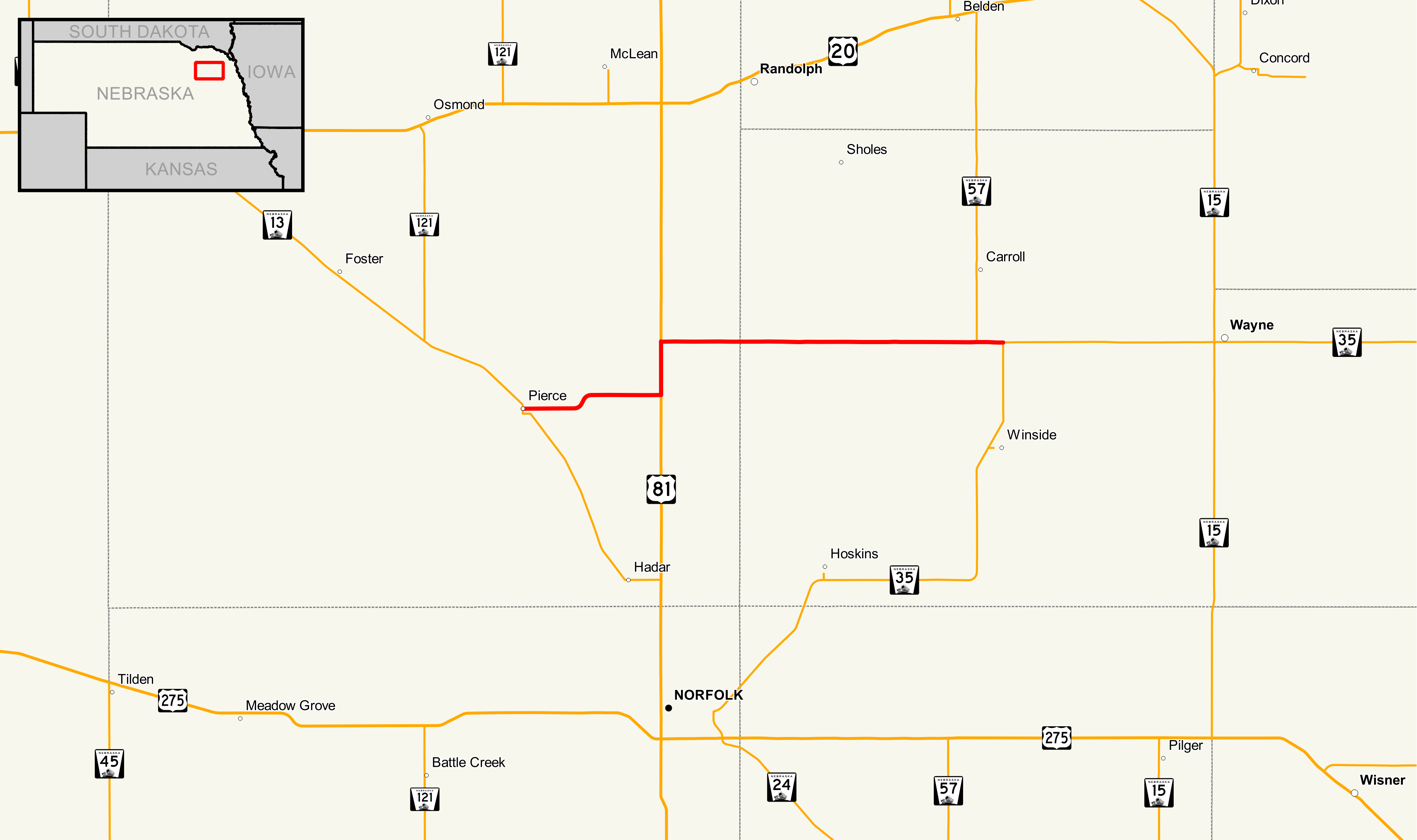
- Nebraska Highway 98 highlighted in red

Route information
- Maintained by NDOT
- Length: 20.46 mi (32.93 km)

Major junctions
- West end: N-13 in Pierce
- US 81 east of Pierce
- East end: N-35 west of Wayne

Location
- Country: United States
- State: Nebraska
- Counties: Pierce, Wayne

Highway system
- Nebraska State Highway System; Interstate; US; State; Link; Spur; State Spurs; Recreation
← N-97	→ N-99

Nebraska Highway 98 is a highway in the northeastern part of the U.S. state of Nebraska. Its western terminus is at an intersection with Nebraska Highway 13 in Pierce. Its eastern terminus is at an intersection with Nebraska Highway 35 west of Wayne.

== Route description ==
Nebraska Highway 98 begins in Pierce at an intersection with NE 13. It heads eastward away from Pierce into farmland where it meets with US 81. NE 98 runs concurrently northward with US 81 for about 2 miles (3.2 km) before splitting off and continuing to the east. It passes NE 57 south of Carroll. The highway terminates about a mile later at an intersection with NE 35.

== Major intersections ==
County	Location	mi	km	Destinations	Notes
Pierce	Pierce	0.00	0.00	N-13 (Lucas Street)	
Pierce		5.48	8.82	US 81 south (555th Avenue)	West end of US 81 overlap
Pierce		7.49	12.05	US 81 north (555th Avenue)	East end of US 81 overlap
Wayne		19.47	31.33	N-57 north (567th Avenue)	
Wayne		20.46	32.93	N-35 (856th Road)	
1.000 mi = 1.609 km; 1.000 km = 0.621 mi: Concurrency terminus
