= 1924 United States presidential election in Nebraska =

- November 4, 1924

Nominee	Calvin Coolidge	John W. Davis	Robert M. La Follette
Party	Republican	Democratic	La Follette Independent
Alliance			Progressive
Home state	Massachusetts	West Virginia	Wisconsin
Running mate	Charles G. Dawes	Charles W. Bryan	Burton K. Wheeler
Electoral vote	8	0	0
Popular vote	218,585	137,289	106,701
Percentage	47.09%	29.58%	22.99%
County results
Coolidge
30–40%
40–50%
50–60%
60–70%
Davis
30–40%
40–50%
La Follette
30–40%
40–50%
50–60%
President before election
Calvin Coolidge
Republican
Elected President
Calvin Coolidge

The 1924 United States presidential election in Nebraska took place on November 4, 1924, as part of the 1924 United States presidential election. Voters chose eight representatives, or electors to the Electoral College, who voted for president and vice president.

Nebraska was won by incumbent Republican president, Calvin Coolidge with a margin of 18.49%.

== Results ==
1924 United States presidential election in Nebraska
Party	Candidate	Votes	%
Republican	Calvin Coolidge (incumbent)	218,585	47.09%
Democratic	John W. Davis	137,289	29.58%
La Follette Independent	Robert M. La Follette	106,701	22.99%
Prohibition	Herman P. Faris	1,594	0.34%
Write-ins	Various	4 (Note: There write-in votes were not listed by county but as a state-wide total.)	0.00%
Total votes		462,575	100%

=== Results by county ===
County	Calvin Coolidge Republican		John W. Davis Democratic		Robert M. La Follette La Follette Independent		Herman P. Faris Prohibition		Margin		Total votes cast
County	#	%	#	%	#	%	#	%	#	%	Total votes cast
Adams	4,824	56.51%	2,353	27.57%	1,331	15.59%	28	0.33%	2,471	28.95%	8,536
Antelope	2,598	47.12%	1,150	20.86%	1,745	31.65%	20	0.36%	853 (Note: In this county where Davis ran third behind Coolidge and La Follette, margin given is Coolidge vote minus La Follette vote and percentage margin Coolidge percentage minus La Follette percentage.)	15.47%	5,513
Arthur	143	34.88%	101	24.63%	164	40.00%	2	0.49%	-21	-5.12%	410
Banner	245	49.80%	88	17.89%	153	31.10%	6	1.22%	92	18.70%	492
Blaine	253	43.40%	132	22.64%	197	33.79%	1	0.17%	56	9.61%	583
Boone	2,013	36.36%	1,782	32.18%	1,717	31.01%	25	0.45%	231	4.17%	5,537
Box Butte	1,506	42.48%	814	22.96%	1,216	34.30%	9	0.25%	290	8.18%	3,545
Boyd	991	37.57%	522	19.79%	1,114	42.23%	11	0.42%	-123	-4.66%	2,638
Brown	1,104	45.02%	714	29.12%	616	25.12%	18	0.73%	390	15.91%	2,452
Buffalo	4,746	54.11%	2,337	26.64%	1,641	18.71%	47	0.54%	2,409	27.47%	8,771
Burt	2,813	54.32%	1,870	36.11%	484	9.35%	12	0.23%	943	18.21%	5,179
Butler	2,435	44.81%	2,444	44.98%	544	10.01%	11	0.20%	-9	-0.17%	5,434
Cass	3,639	49.55%	2,352	32.03%	1,327	18.07%	26	0.35%	1,287	17.52%	7,344
Cedar	2,441	39.92%	1,747	28.57%	1,917	31.35%	10	0.16%	524	8.57%	6,115
Chase	919	48.17%	570	29.87%	411	21.54%	8	0.42%	349	18.29%	1,908
Cherry	1,663	43.69%	1,169	30.71%	967	25.41%	7	0.18%	494	12.98%	3,806
Cheyenne	1,719	51.76%	555	16.71%	1,034	31.14%	13	0.39%	685	20.63%	3,321
Clay	2,758	50.32%	1,716	31.31%	986	17.99%	21	0.38%	1,042	19.01%	5,481
Colfax	1,450	39.02%	1,293	34.80%	965	25.97%	8	0.22%	157	4.22%	3,716
Cuming	1,642	36.71%	981	21.93%	1,840	41.14%	10	0.22%	-198	-4.43%	4,473
Custer	3,833	39.95%	2,575	26.84%	3,144	32.77%	43	0.45%	689	7.18%	9,595
Dakota	1,235	39.38%	964	30.74%	931	29.69%	6	0.19%	271	8.64%	3,136
Dawes	1,575	41.25%	595	15.58%	1,632	42.74%	16	0.42%	-57	-1.49%	3,818
Dawson	3,016	50.67%	1,526	25.64%	1,386	23.29%	24	0.40%	1,490	25.03%	5,952
Deuel	775	58.23%	316	23.74%	236	17.73%	4	0.30%	459	34.49%	1,331
Dixon	2,153	50.98%	1,090	25.81%	964	22.83%	16	0.38%	1,063	25.17%	4,223
Dodge	3,798	45.63%	2,183	26.23%	2,316	27.83%	26	0.31%	1,482	17.81%	8,323
Douglas	29,390	44.98%	18,672	28.58%	17,184	26.30%	94	0.14%	10,718	16.40%	65,340
Dundy	1,036	56.67%	459	25.11%	324	17.72%	9	0.49%	577	31.56%	1,828
Fillmore	2,758	51.54%	2,156	40.29%	429	8.02%	8	0.15%	602	11.25%	5,351
Franklin	1,920	51.27%	1,331	35.54%	476	12.71%	18	0.48%	589	15.73%	3,745
Frontier	1,497	52.27%	599	20.91%	745	26.01%	23	0.80%	752	26.26%	2,864
Furnas	2,378	50.30%	1,534	32.45%	801	16.94%	15	0.32%	844	17.85%	4,728
Gage	5,331	50.70%	3,330	31.67%	1,825	17.36%	28	0.27%	2,001	19.03%	10,514
Garden	725	46.68%	459	29.56%	361	23.25%	8	0.52%	266	17.13%	1,553
Garfield	757	59.14%	251	19.61%	268	20.94%	4	0.31%	489	38.20%	1,280
Gosper	540	36.31%	394	26.50%	550	36.99%	3	0.20%	-10	-0.67%	1,487
Grant	260	48.69%	191	35.77%	82	15.36%	1	0.19%	69	12.92%	534
Greeley	773	26.48%	1,220	41.80%	908	31.11%	18	0.62%	312 (Note: In this county where Coolidge ran third behind both Davis and La Follette, margin given is Davis vote minus La Follette vote and percentage margin Davis percentage minus La Follette percentage.)	10.69%	2,919
Hall	4,040	47.39%	1,863	21.85%	2,564	30.08%	58	0.68%	1,476	17.31%	8,525
Hamilton	2,935	56.12%	1,545	29.54%	722	13.80%	28	0.54%	1,390	26.58%	5,230
Harlan	1,845	50.01%	1,216	32.96%	604	16.37%	24	0.65%	629	17.05%	3,689
Hayes	475	42.60%	288	25.83%	347	31.12%	5	0.45%	128	11.48%	1,115
Hitchcock	987	45.80%	633	29.37%	528	24.50%	7	0.32%	354	16.43%	2,155
Holt	2,207	37.14%	1,529	25.73%	2,176	36.61%	31	0.52%	31	0.52%	5,943
Hooker	176	40.00%	111	25.23%	151	34.32%	2	0.45%	25	5.68%	440
Howard	1,091	31.58%	1,434	41.51%	914	26.45%	16	0.46%	-343	-9.93%	3,455
Jefferson	2,752	48.12%	1,824	31.89%	1,134	19.83%	9	0.16%	928	16.23%	5,719
Johnson	2,075	54.12%	1,285	33.52%	465	12.13%	9	0.23%	790	20.61%	3,834
Kearney	1,453	45.04%	1,243	38.53%	508	15.75%	22	0.68%	210	6.51%	3,226
Keith	1,069	49.93%	602	28.12%	462	21.58%	8	0.37%	467	21.81%	2,141
Keya Paha	504	41.48%	251	20.66%	451	37.12%	9	0.74%	53	4.36%	1,215
Kimball	750	51.23%	253	17.28%	461	31.49%	0	0.00%	289	19.74%	1,464
Knox	2,405	38.63%	1,532	24.61%	2,265	36.38%	24	0.39%	140	2.25%	6,226
Lancaster	18,061	54.40%	11,563	34.83%	3,485	10.50%	90	0.27%	6,498	19.57%	33,199
Lincoln	2,857	40.94%	1,373	19.67%	2,723	39.02%	26	0.37%	134	1.92%	6,979
Logan	277	40.56%	165	24.16%	234	34.26%	7	1.02%	43	6.30%	683
Loup	285	47.98%	105	17.68%	200	33.67%	4	0.67%	85	14.31%	594
Madison	3,537	40.68%	1,959	22.53%	3,125	35.94%	74	0.85%	412	4.74%	8,695
McPherson	213	40.34%	96	18.18%	207	39.20%	12	2.27%	6	1.14%	528
Merrick	2,324	54.34%	1,137	26.58%	796	18.61%	20	0.47%	1,187	27.75%	4,277
Morrill	1,153	45.77%	734	29.14%	623	24.73%	9	0.36%	419	16.63%	2,519
Nance	1,574	47.42%	1,130	34.05%	603	18.17%	12	0.36%	444	13.38%	3,319
Nemaha	2,378	48.97%	1,871	38.53%	604	12.44%	3	0.06%	507	10.44%	4,856
Nuckolls	2,595	54.02%	1,596	33.22%	600	12.49%	13	0.27%	999	20.80%	4,804
Otoe	3,245	50.12%	2,208	34.10%	1,003	15.49%	19	0.29%	1,037	16.02%	6,475
Pawnee	2,147	55.85%	1,365	35.51%	328	8.53%	4	0.10%	782	20.34%	3,844
Perkins	896	52.34%	493	28.80%	318	18.57%	5	0.29%	403	23.54%	1,712
Phelps	1,928	48.88%	993	25.18%	1,015	25.74%	8	0.20%	913	23.15%	3,944
Pierce	1,570	42.36%	760	20.51%	1,363	36.78%	13	0.35%	207	5.59%	3,706
Platte	2,108	30.70%	2,173	31.64%	2,576	37.51%	10	0.15%	-403	-5.87%	6,867
Polk	2,354	56.49%	1,229	29.49%	567	13.61%	17	0.41%	1,125	27.00%	4,167
Red Willow	1,931	44.61%	1,122	25.92%	1,264	29.20%	12	0.28%	667	15.41%	4,329
Richardson	3,625	48.22%	3,089	41.09%	789	10.50%	14	0.19%	536	7.13%	7,517
Rock	585	47.33%	293	23.71%	353	28.56%	5	0.40%	232	18.77%	1,236
Saline	2,834	43.10%	3,123	47.49%	610	9.28%	9	0.14%	-289	-4.39%	6,576
Sarpy	1,411	38.86%	1,247	34.34%	964	26.55%	9	0.25%	164	4.52%	3,631
Saunders	3,499	45.15%	2,823	36.43%	1,414	18.25%	13	0.17%	676	8.72%	7,749
Scotts Bluff	3,410	62.29%	1,132	20.68%	902	16.48%	30	0.55%	2,278	41.61%	5,474
Seward	2,797	49.21%	1,848	32.51%	1,023	18.00%	16	0.28%	949	16.70%	5,684
Sheridan	1,509	41.46%	661	18.16%	1,453	39.92%	17	0.47%	56	1.54%	3,640
Sherman	1,182	39.88%	1,048	35.36%	715	24.12%	19	0.64%	134	4.52%	2,964
Sioux	480	36.01%	149	11.18%	697	52.29%	7	0.53%	-217	-16.28%	1,333
Stanton	962	39.43%	596	24.43%	874	35.82%	8	0.33%	88	3.61%	2,440
Thayer	2,847	52.73%	1,719	31.84%	818	15.15%	15	0.28%	1,128	20.89%	5,399
Thomas	206	35.46%	216	37.18%	158	27.19%	1	0.17%	-10	-1.72%	581
Thurston	1,210	37.36%	1,191	36.77%	829	25.59%	9	0.28%	19	0.59%	3,239
Valley	2,014	55.04%	802	21.92%	834	22.79%	9	0.25%	1,180	32.25%	3,659
Washington	1,876	45.16%	1,231	29.63%	961	23.13%	86	2.07%	645	15.53%	4,154
Wayne	1,840	52.50%	775	22.11%	879	25.08%	11	0.31%	961	27.42%	3,505
Webster	2,194	54.40%	1,207	29.93%	616	15.27%	16	0.40%	987	24.47%	4,033
Wheeler	205	27.01%	145	19.10%	404	53.23%	5	0.66%	-199	-26.22%	759
York	4,110	58.66%	1,778	25.37%	1,091	15.57%	28	0.40%	2,332	33.28%	7,007
Totals	218,585	47.09%	137,289	29.58%	106,701	22.99%	1,594	0.34%	81,296	17.51%	464,173

== See also ==
- United States presidential elections in Nebraska
