= Stanton County, Nebraska =

County in Nebraska, United States

- County
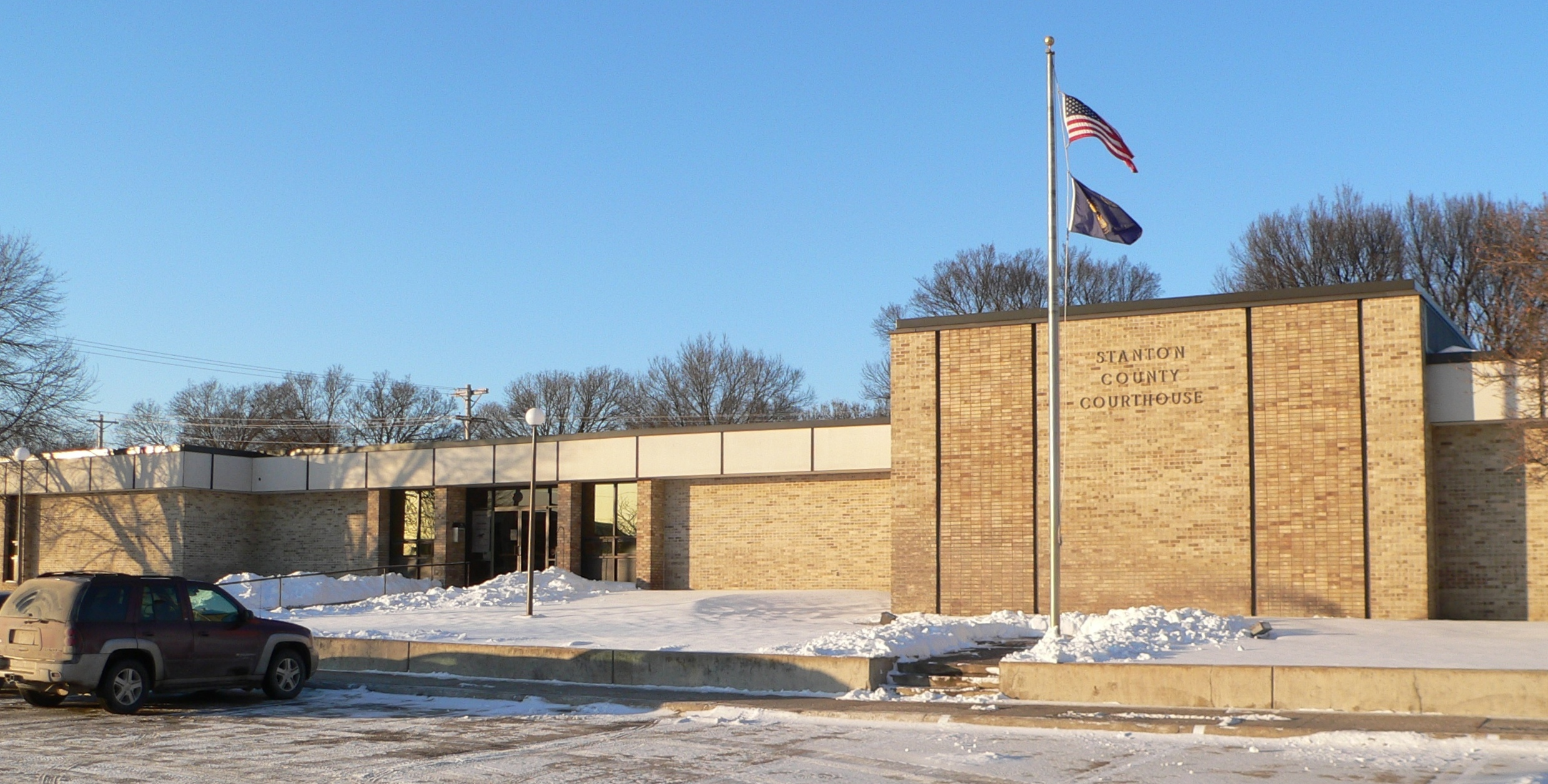
- Stanton County Courthouse in Stanton

- Location within the U.S. state of Nebraska
- Coordinates: 41°55′N 97°11′W
- Country: United States
- State: Nebraska
- Founded: 1856 (founded as "Izard County"); 1862 (renamed "Stanton County"); 1867 (organized)
- Named for: Edwin M. Stanton
- Seat: Stanton
- Largest city: Stanton

Area
  - Total: 431 sq mi (1,120 km^{2})
  - Land: 428 sq mi (1,110 km^{2})
  - Water: 3.1 sq mi (8.0 km^{2}) 0.7%

Population (2020)
  - Total: 5,842
  - Estimate (2025): 5,744 ▼
  - Density: 13.6/sq mi (5.27/km^{2})
- Time zone: UTC−6 (Central)
  - Summer (DST): UTC−5 (CDT)
- Congressional district: 1st
- Website: stantoncounty.nebraska.gov

Stanton County is a county in the U.S. state of Nebraska. As of the 2020 United States census, the population was 5,842. Its county seat is Stanton. The county was formed in 1856 and organized in 1867. It was first called Izard County until 1862, when it was renamed for Edwin M. Stanton, Secretary of War during the administration of President Abraham Lincoln.

Stanton County is part of the Norfolk, NE Micropolitan Statistical Area.

In the Nebraska license plate system, Stanton County is represented by the prefix 53 (it had the 53rd-greatest number of vehicles registered in the county when the license plate system was established in 1922).

== Geography ==
The terrain of Stanton County consists of low rolling hills, sloped toward the east. The Elkhorn River flows easterly through the upper central part of the county. The county has a total area of 431 square miles (1,120 km^{2}), of which 428 square miles (1,110 km^{2}) is land and 3.1 square miles (8.0 km^{2}) (0.7%) is water.

=== Major highways ===
- U.S. Highway 275
- Nebraska Highway 15
- Nebraska Highway 24
- Nebraska Highway 32
- Nebraska Highway 35
- Nebraska Highway 57

=== Adjacent counties ===
- Cuming County – east
- Colfax County – south
- Platte County – southwest
- Madison County – west
- Pierce County – northwest
- Wayne County – north

=== Protected areas ===
- Black Island State Wildlife Management Area (partial)
- Maskenthine Lake Recreation Area
- Red Fox State Wildlife Management Area
- Wood Duck State Wildlife Management Area

== Demographics ==
Historical population
Census	Pop.	Note	%±
1870	636		—
1880	1,813		185.1%
1890	4,619		154.8%
1900	6,959		50.7%
1910	7,542		8.4%
1920	7,756		2.8%
1930	7,809		0.7%
1940	6,887		−11.8%
1950	6,387		−7.3%
1960	5,783		−9.5%
1970	5,758		−0.4%
1980	6,549		13.7%
1990	6,244		−4.7%
2000	6,455		3.4%
2010	6,129		−5.1%
2020	5,842		−4.7%
2025 (est.)	5,744	▼	−1.7%
US Decennial Census; 1790-1960 1900-1990; 1990-2000 2010

=== 2020 census ===
As of the 2020 census, the county had a population of 5,842. The median age was 39.8 years. 25.8% of residents were under the age of 18 and 17.3% of residents were 65 years of age or older. For every 100 females there were 103.3 males, and for every 100 females age 18 and over there were 101.5 males age 18 and over.

The racial makeup of the county was 90.9% White, 0.4% Black or African American, 0.5% American Indian and Alaska Native, 0.3% Asian, 0.1% Native Hawaiian and Pacific Islander, 2.4% from some other race, and 5.4% from two or more races. Hispanic or Latino residents of any race comprised 6.0% of the population.

26.7% of residents lived in urban areas, while 73.3% lived in rural areas.

There were 2,239 households in the county, of which 32.6% had children under the age of 18 living with them and 18.1% had a female householder with no spouse or partner present. About 22.9% of all households were made up of individuals and 10.7% had someone living alone who was 65 years of age or older.

There were 2,460 housing units, of which 9.0% were vacant. Among occupied housing units, 80.6% were owner-occupied and 19.4% were renter-occupied. The homeowner vacancy rate was 1.3% and the rental vacancy rate was 8.0%.

=== 2000 census ===
As of the 2000 United States census, there were 6,455 people, 2,297 households, and 1,784 families in the county. The population density was 15 people per square mile (5.8 people/km^{2}). There were 2,452 housing units at an average density of 6 per square mile (2.3/km^{2}). The racial makeup of the county was 96.72% White, 0.42% Black or African American, 0.48% Native American, 0.12% Asian, 1.38% from other races, and 0.88% from two or more races. 2.31% of the population were Hispanic or Latino of any race. 55.8% were of German, 9.7% Czech and 5.6% Irish ancestry.

There were 2,297 households, out of which 38.90% had children under the age of 18 living with them, 67.50% were married couples living together, 7.20% had a female householder with no husband present, and 22.30% were non-families. 19.20% of all households were made up of individuals, and 8.10% had someone living alone who was 65 years of age or older. The average household size was 2.76 and the average family size was 3.16.

The county population contained 29.80% under the age of 18, 7.60% from 18 to 24, 27.40% from 25 to 44, 21.80% from 45 to 64, and 13.50% who were 65 years of age or older. The median age was 36 years. For every 100 females, there were 98.40 males. For every 100 females age 18 and over, there were 96.40 males.

The median income for a household in the county was $36,676, and the median income for a family was $41,040. Males had a median income of $27,969 versus $19,428 for females. The per capita income for the county was $15,511. About 5.30% of families and 6.80% of the population were below the poverty line, including 6.80% of those under age 18 and 7.20% of those age 65 or over.

== Communities ==
=== City ===
- Stanton (county seat)

=== Village ===
- Pilger

=== Census-designated place ===
- Woodland Park

== Politics ==
Stanton County voters are reliably Republican. In no national election since 1936 has the county selected the Democratic Party candidate.

United States presidential election results for Stanton County, Nebraska
Year	Republican		Democratic		Third party(ies)	
Year	No.	%	No.	%	No.	%
1900	788	50.48%	751	48.11%	22	1.41%
1904	895	59.87%	513	34.31%	87	5.82%
1908	792	48.59%	823	50.49%	15	0.92%
1912	471	31.15%	724	47.88%	317	20.97%
1916	736	43.91%	899	53.64%	41	2.45%
1920	1,457	72.67%	501	24.99%	47	2.34%
1924	962	39.43%	596	24.43%	882	36.15%
1928	1,211	48.17%	1,296	51.55%	7	0.28%
1932	568	19.73%	2,302	79.96%	9	0.31%
1936	1,169	36.55%	1,917	59.94%	112	3.50%
1940	2,074	65.74%	1,081	34.26%	0	0.00%
1944	1,682	65.81%	874	34.19%	0	0.00%
1948	1,259	56.01%	989	43.99%	0	0.00%
1952	1,983	74.69%	672	25.31%	0	0.00%
1956	1,676	65.14%	897	34.86%	0	0.00%
1960	1,680	66.22%	857	33.78%	0	0.00%
1964	1,299	56.16%	1,014	43.84%	0	0.00%
1968	1,408	71.36%	411	20.83%	154	7.81%
1972	1,662	77.66%	478	22.34%	0	0.00%
1976	1,469	64.26%	764	33.42%	53	2.32%
1980	1,945	78.87%	362	14.68%	159	6.45%
1984	2,082	83.01%	411	16.39%	15	0.60%
1988	1,711	72.50%	639	27.08%	10	0.42%
1992	1,274	49.71%	496	19.35%	793	30.94%
1996	1,457	59.64%	577	23.62%	409	16.74%
2000	1,895	76.23%	500	20.11%	91	3.66%
2004	2,159	78.65%	559	20.36%	27	0.98%
2008	1,781	71.38%	664	26.61%	50	2.00%
2012	1,949	73.71%	614	23.22%	81	3.06%
2016	2,187	78.08%	417	14.89%	197	7.03%
2020	2,561	80.92%	532	16.81%	72	2.27%
2024	2,536	82.44%	492	15.99%	48	1.56%
