= Sholes, Nebraska =

Village in Wayne County, Nebraska, United States

- Village
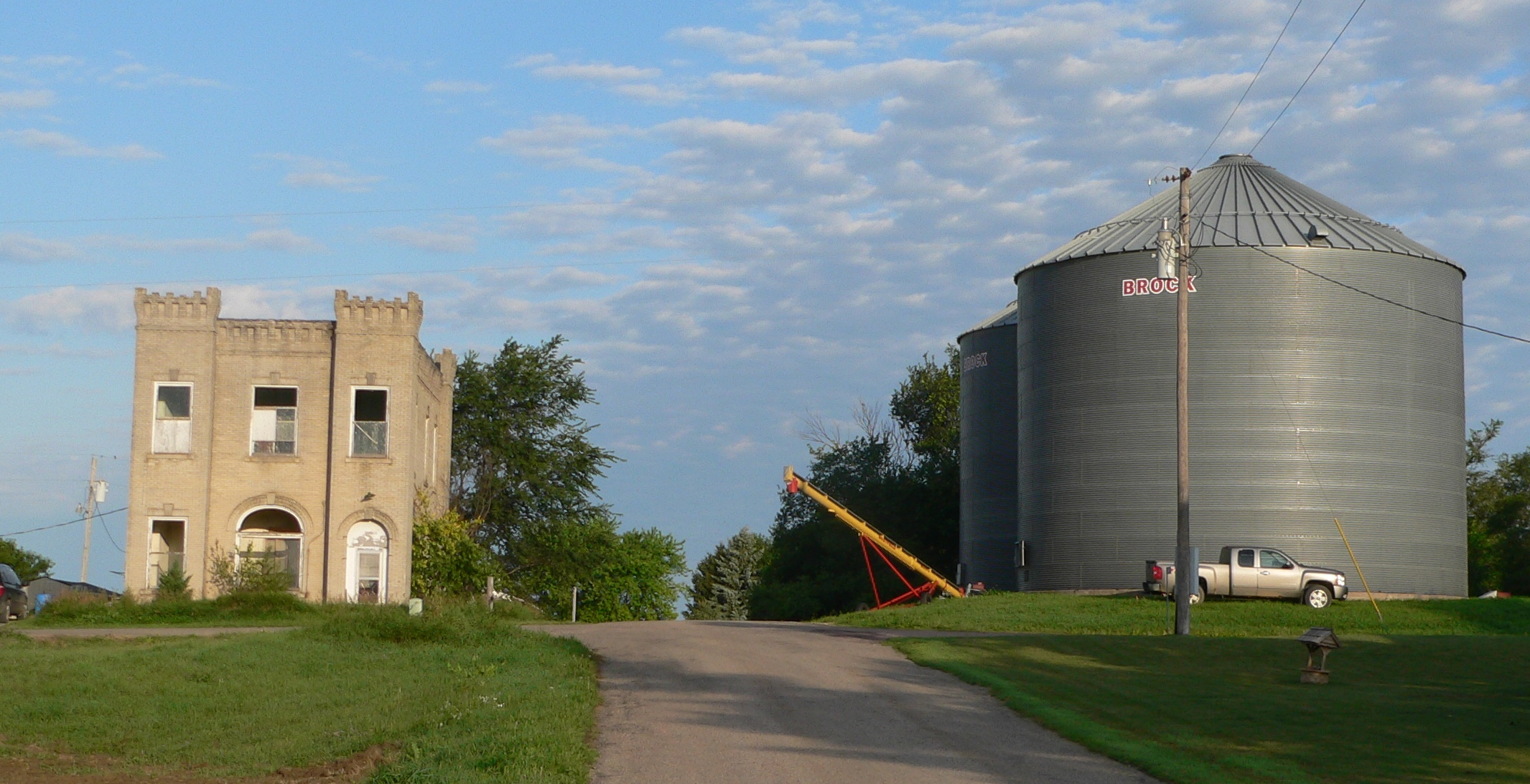
- Wayne County Bank building and grain bins in Sholes, July 2010

- Location of Sholes, Nebraska
- Coordinates: 42°20′05″N 97°17′41″W
- Country: United States
- State: Nebraska
- County: Wayne

Area
  - Total: 0.14 sq mi (0.36 km^{2})
  - Land: 0.14 sq mi (0.36 km^{2})
  - Water: 0 sq mi (0.00 km^{2})
- Elevation: 1,736 ft (529 m)

Population (2020)
  - Total: 15
  - Estimate (2021): 15
  - Density: 110/sq mi (42/km^{2})
- Time zone: UTC-6 (Central (CST))
  - Summer (DST): UTC-5 (CDT)
- ZIP code: 68771
- Area codes: 402 and 531
- FIPS code: 31-45190
- GNIS feature ID: 2399811

Sholes is a village in Wayne County, Nebraska, United States. The population was 15 at the 2020 census.

== History ==
Sholes was established in 1886 when the railroad was extended to that point. It was named for Lyman Sholes, a railroad official.

A post office was established at Sholes in 1902, and remained in operation until it was discontinued in 1965.

== Geography ==
According to the United States Census Bureau, the village has a total area of 0.14 square miles (0.36 km^{2}), all land.

== Demographics ==
Historical population
Census	Pop.	Note	%±
1920	50		—
1930	90		80.0%
1940	72		−20.0%
1950	32		−55.6%
1960	26		−18.7%
1970	22		−15.4%
1980	27		22.7%
1990	22		−18.5%
2000	24		9.1%
2010	21		−12.5%
2020	16		−23.8%
U.S. Decennial Census

=== 2010 census ===
As of the census of 2010, there were 21 people, 9 households, and 8 families residing in the village. The population density was 150.0 inhabitants per square mile (57.9/km^{2}). There were 11 housing units at an average density of 78.6 per square mile (30.3/km^{2}). The racial makeup of the village was 100.0% White.

There were 9 households, of which 22.2% had children under the age of 18 living with them, 88.9% were married couples living together, and 11.1% were non-families. 11.1% of all households were made up of individuals, and 11.1% had someone living alone who was 65 years of age or older. The average household size was 2.33 and the average family size was 2.50.

The median age in the village was 51.2 years. 19% of residents were under the age of 18; 0.0% were between the ages of 18 and 24; 19.1% were from 25 to 44; 33.3% were from 45 to 64; and 28.6% were 65 years of age or older. The gender makeup of the village was 57.1% male and 42.9% female.

=== 2000 census ===
As of the census of 2000, there were 24 people, 12 households, and 8 families residing in the village. The population density was 177.8 inhabitants per square mile (68.6/km^{2}). There were 12 housing units at an average density of 88.9 per square mile (34.3/km^{2}). The racial makeup of the village was 100.00% White.

There were 12 households, out of which 33.3% had children under the age of 18 living with them, 66.7% were married couples living together, and 33.3% were non-families. 33.3% of all households were made up of individuals, and 8.3% had someone living alone who was 65 years of age or older. The average household size was 2.00 and the average family size was 2.50.

In the village, the population was spread out, with 16.7% under the age of 18, 8.3% from 18 to 24, 45.8% from 25 to 44, 16.7% from 45 to 64, and 12.5% who were 65 years of age or older. The median age was 36 years. For every 100 females, there were 140.0 males. For every 100 females age 18 and over, there were 122.2 males.

As of 2000 the median income for a household in the village was $28,750, and the median income for a family was $36,250. Males had a median income of $22,500 versus $18,750 for females. The per capita income for the village was $23,432. None of the population and none of the families were below the poverty line.

== See also ==
- List of municipalities in Nebraska
