= Winside, Nebraska =

Village in Wayne County, Nebraska, United States

- Village
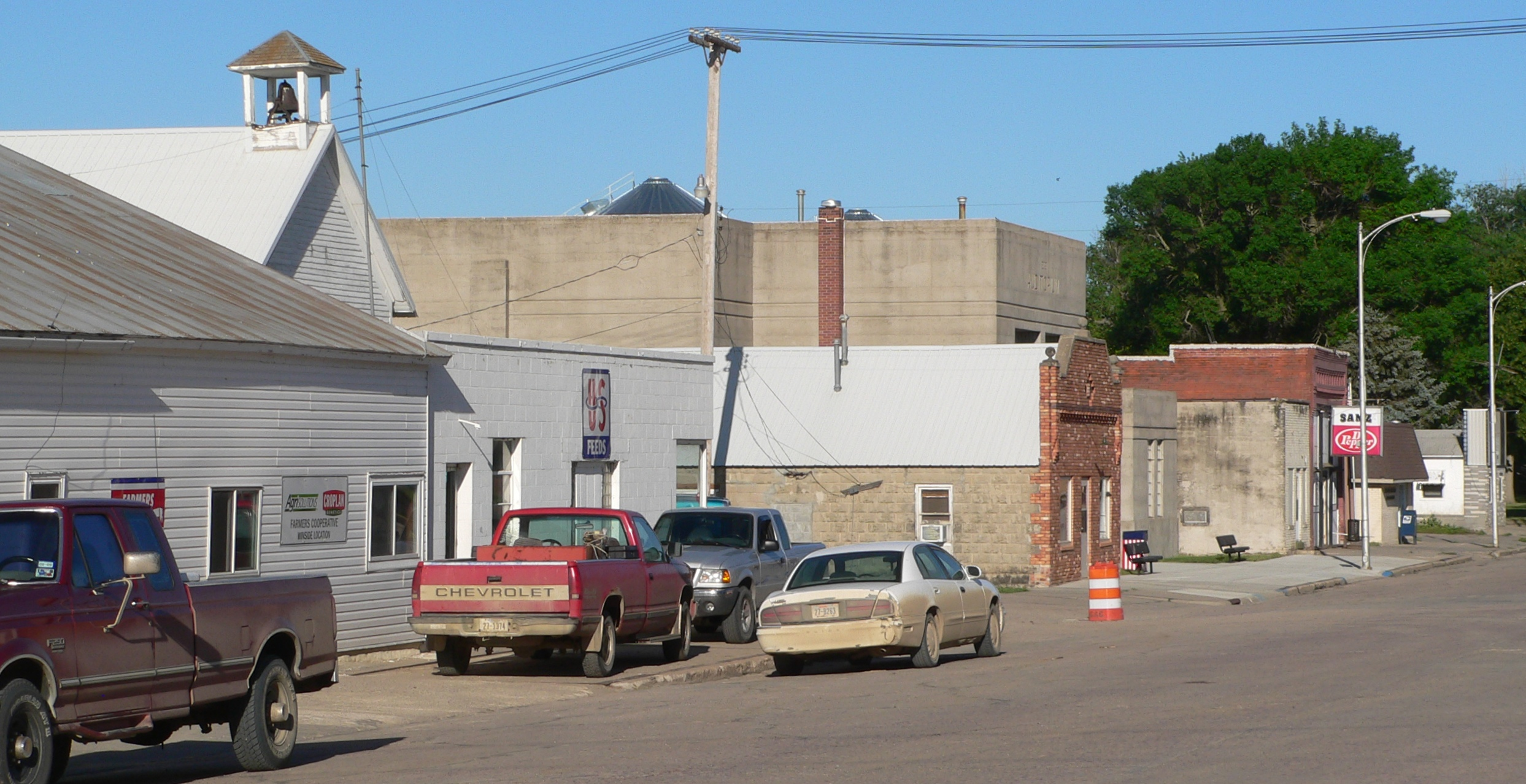
- Downtown Winside, June 2010

- Location of Winside, Nebraska
- Coordinates: 42°10′39″N 97°10′31″W
- Country: United States
- State: Nebraska
- County: Wayne

Area
  - Total: 0.26 sq mi (0.68 km^{2})
  - Land: 0.26 sq mi (0.68 km^{2})
  - Water: 0 sq mi (0.00 km^{2})
- Elevation: 1,598 ft (487 m)

Population (2020)
  - Total: 381
  - Estimate (2021): 383
  - Density: 1,500/sq mi (560/km^{2})
- Time zone: UTC-6 (Central (CST))
  - Summer (DST): UTC-5 (CDT)
- ZIP code: 68790
- Area code: 402
- FIPS code: 31-53380
- GNIS feature ID: 2399720

Winside is a village in Wayne County, Nebraska, United States. The population was 381 at the 2020 census.

== History ==
Winside was platted in 1886 when the railroad was extended to that point. It was so named because its promoters hoped the town would win the railroad over rival town Northside.

== Geography ==
According to the United States Census Bureau, the village has a total area of 0.26 square miles (0.67 km^{2}), all land.

== Demographics ==
Historical population
Census	Pop.	Note	%±
1890	130		—
1900	400		207.7%
1910	450		12.5%
1920	488		8.4%
1930	483		−1.0%
1940	451		−6.6%
1950	454		0.7%
1960	416		−8.4%
1970	453		8.9%
1980	439		−3.1%
1990	434		−1.1%
2000	468		7.8%
2010	427		−8.8%
2020	379		−11.2%
U.S. Decennial Census

=== 2010 census ===
As of the census of 2010, there were 427 people, 176 households, and 120 families residing in the village. The population density was 1,642.3 inhabitants per square mile (634.1/km^{2}). There were 205 housing units at an average density of 788.5 per square mile (304.4/km^{2}). The racial makeup of the village was 96.5% White, 0.5% African American, 0.5% Native American, 0.7% Asian, and 1.9% from two or more races. Hispanic or Latino of any race were 1.2% of the population.

There were 176 households, of which 37.5% had children under the age of 18 living with them, 55.7% were married couples living together, 8.0% had a female householder with no husband present, 4.5% had a male householder with no wife present, and 31.8% were non-families. 27.8% of all households were made up of individuals, and 14.7% had someone living alone who was 65 years of age or older. The average household size was 2.43 and the average family size was 3.02.

The median age in the village was 37.6 years. 28.3% of residents were under the age of 18; 7.6% were between the ages of 18 and 24; 24.2% were from 25 to 44; 24.2% were from 45 to 64; and 15.9% were 65 years of age or older. The gender makeup of the village was 47.1% male and 52.9% female.

=== 2000 census ===
As of the census of 2000, there were 468 people, 189 households, and 122 families residing in the village. The population density was 1,778.5 inhabitants per square mile (686.7/km^{2}). There were 205 housing units at an average density of 779.0 per square mile (300.8/km^{2}). The racial makeup of the village was 98.72% White, 0.43% African American, 0.64% Asian, and 0.21% from two or more races.

There were 189 households, out of which 33.3% had children under the age of 18 living with them, 51.9% were married couples living together, 9.5% had a female householder with no husband present, and 35.4% were non-families. 32.3% of all households were made up of individuals, and 16.9% had someone living alone who was 65 years of age or older. The average household size was 2.48 and the average family size was 3.19.

In the village, the population was spread out, with 28.8% under the age of 18, 9.2% from 18 to 24, 25.9% from 25 to 44, 19.0% from 45 to 64, and 17.1% who were 65 years of age or older. The median age was 35 years. For every 100 females, there were 82.8 males. For every 100 females age 18 and over, there were 91.4 males.

As of 2000 the median income for a household in the village was $30,208, and the median income for a family was $36,875. Males had a median income of $27,188 versus $20,625 for females. The per capita income for the village was $14,707. About 7.0% of families and 12.4% of the population were below the poverty line, including 23.5% of those under age 18 and 11.0% of those age 65 or over.

== See also ==
- List of cities in Nebraska
