= Haskin Smith =

American politician

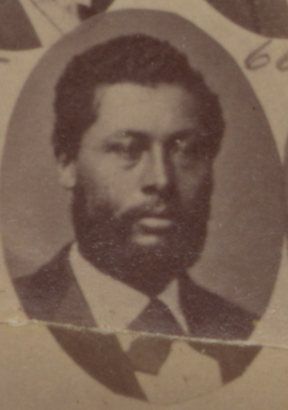
Official 1874 portrait by Elisaeus Von Seutter

Haskin S. Smith was an American politician and state legislator in Mississippi. He represented Claiborne County, Mississippi in the Mississippi House of Representatives from 1872 to 1876. His marriage to a white woman (miscegnation) in 1874 was controversial. He opposed an 1875 proposal to have convicts work away from penitentiaries.

He was reported to have worked at a hotel in Port Gibson, Mississippi as a waiter and shoe shiner when he married and departed the area with the owner's daughter within whose family he had served.

== See also ==
- African American officeholders from the end of the Civil War until before 1900
