= Contact Peak =

Mountain in Antarctica

Contact Peak (67°46′S 67°29′W) is a prominent rock peak, 1,005 metres (3,300 ft) high, which is the southeasternmost peak on Pourquoi Pas Island, off the west coast of Graham Land. It was first sighted and roughly charted in 1909 by the French Antarctic Expedition under Jean-Baptiste Charcot. It was surveyed in 1936 by the British Graham Land Expedition and in 1948 by the Falkland Islands Dependencies Survey (FIDS). It was so named by FIDS because the peak marks the granite-volcanic contact in the cliffs which is visible at a considerable distance.
