= Nebraska Highway 15 =

State highway in Nebraska, U.S.

State Highway 15

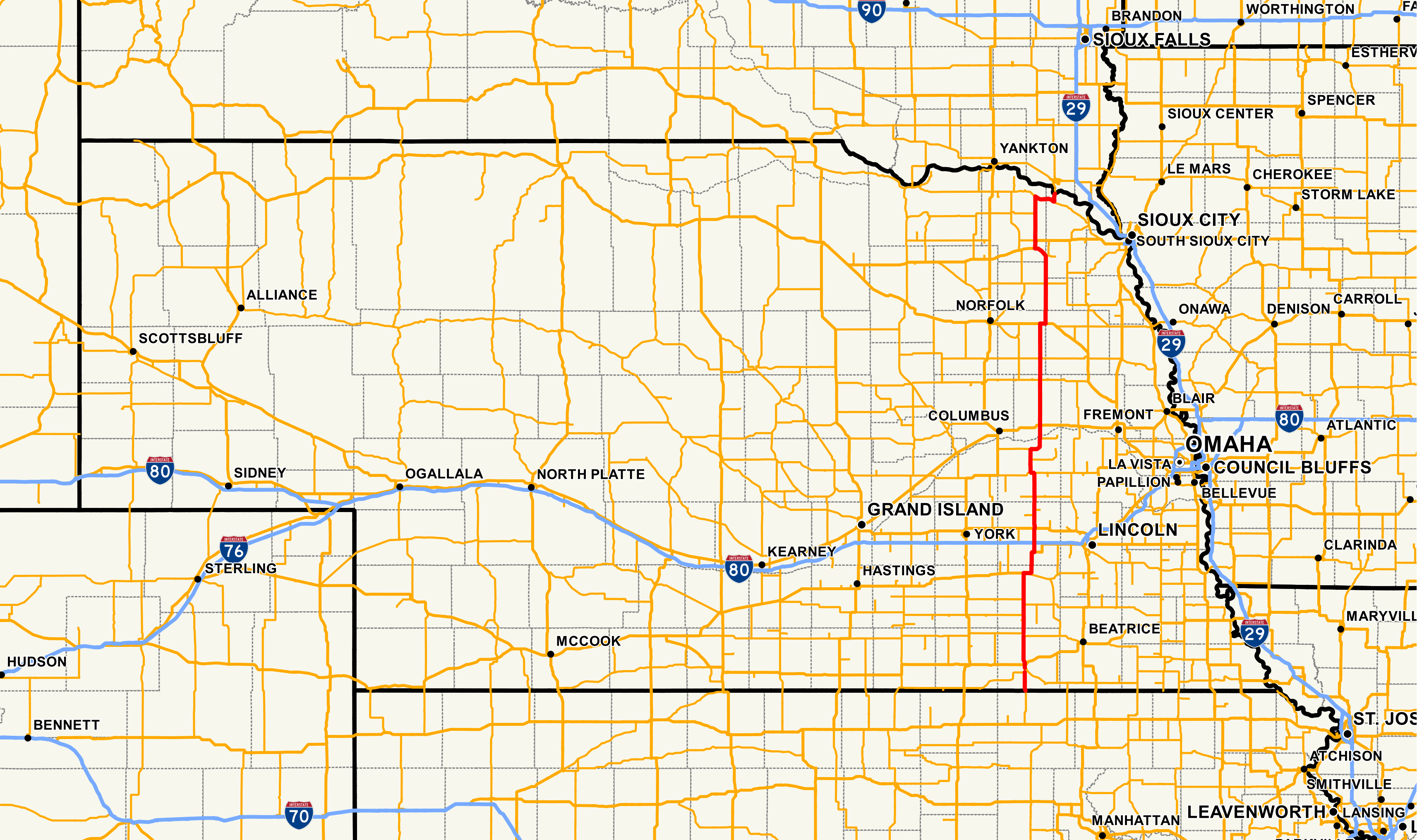
- Nebraska Highway 15 highlighted in red

Route information
- Maintained by NDOT
- Length: 210.11 mi (338.14 km)
- Existed: 1925–present

Major junctions
- South end: K-15 south of Fairbury
- US 136 in Fairbury; US 6 west of Dorchester; I-80 south of Seward; US 34 in Seward; N-92 south of David City; US 30 north of Schuyler; US 275 north of Pilger; US 20 in Laurel
- North end: SD 19 northeast of Maskell

Location
- Country: United States
- State: Nebraska
- Counties: Jefferson, Saline, Seward, Butler, Colfax, Stanton, Wayne, Cedar, Dixon

Highway system
- Nebraska State Highway System; Interstate; US; State; Link; Spur; State Spurs; Recreation
← N-14	→ N-16

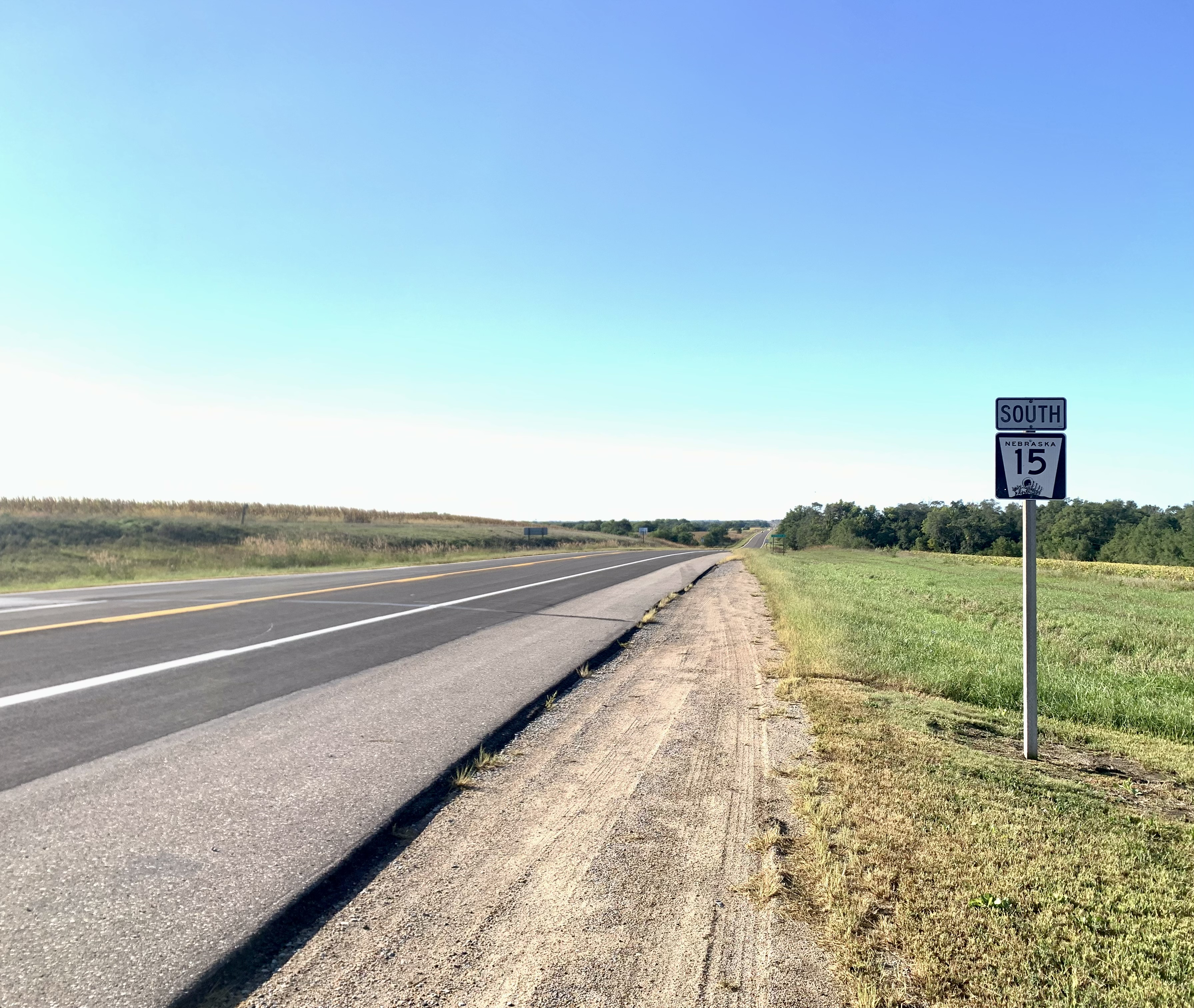
Nebraska Highway 15 in Saline County, Nebraska

Nebraska Highway 15 (N-15) is a highway in eastern Nebraska, United States. It has a southern terminus at the Kansas border south of Fairbury and a northern terminus northeast of Maskell at the South Dakota border.

== Route description ==
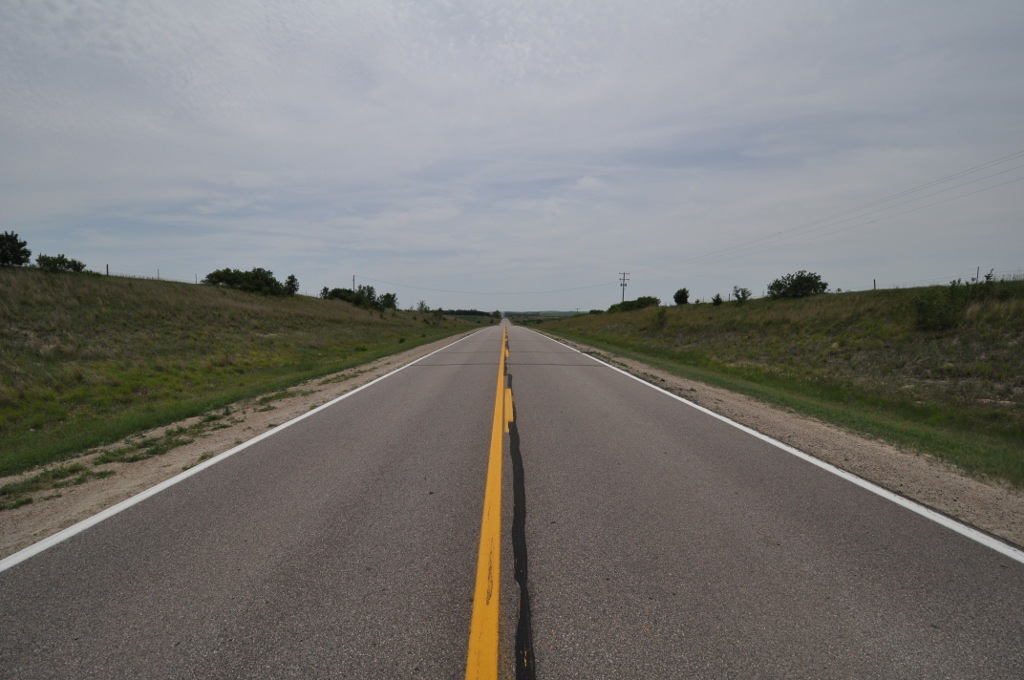
Highway 15 as it heads straight south through the rolling hills of northern Nebraska, June 2012

Nebraska Highway 15 begins at the Kansas border south of Fairbury. This southern terminus for NE 15 is also the northern terminus for K-15. It goes north through farmland towards Fairbury and crosses the Little Blue River. At Fairbury it crosses U.S. Highway 136. Near Dorchester it joins with U.S. Highway 6 for about 10 miles (16 km) before splitting off again, and then crossing Interstate 80 south of Seward. In Seward, it meets U.S. Highway 34. It continues north and crosses the Platte River just before reaching Schuyler, and then U.S. Highway 30. It continues north from there where, near Pilger, it travels east for 2 miles (3.2 km) along with U.S. Highway 275. Then it heads back north and passes through Wayne before joining U.S. Highway 20 for 3 miles (4.8 km) near Laurel. It then splits from US 20, and travels due north until it junctions with Nebraska Highway 12. It overlaps NE 12 for 7 miles (11 km) past Maskell and then heads back north where it crosses the Missouri River via the Vermillion-Newcastle Bridge into South Dakota and changes to South Dakota Highway 19.

== Major intersections ==
County	Location	mi	km	Destinations	Notes
Jefferson		0.00	0.00	K-15 south (King Road)	Continuation into Kansas; former K-15W
Jefferson	Fairbury	7.15	11.51	N-8 west (709th Road)	Southern end of N-8 concurrency
Jefferson	Fairbury	8.86	14.26	N-8 east / Oregon National Historic Trail / California National Historic Trail / Pony Express National Historic Trail	Northern end of N-8 concurrency
Jefferson	Fairbury	10.08	16.22	US 136 (14th Street) / Oregon National Historic Trail / California National Historic Trail / Pony Express National Historic Trail	
Jefferson		21.22	34.15	N-4 east (723rd Road)	Southern end of N-4 concurrency
Jefferson		22.22	35.76	N-4 west (724th Road)	Northern end of N-4 concurrency
Saline		27.25	43.85	S-76C west (County Road V) – Western	
Saline		29.25	47.07	N-74 west (County Road T)	
Saline		33.25	53.51	N-41 east (County Road P)	Southern end of N-41 concurrency
Saline		35.26	56.75	N-41 west (County Road N)	Northern end of N-41 concurrency
Saline		45.27	72.86	US 6 west (County Road D)	Southern end of US 6 concurrency
Saline		45.88	73.84	N-33 east (County Road Dd) – Dorchester, Crete	
Saline		48.47	78.00	L-76E south (County Road 1400) – Dorchester	
Seward		56.99	91.72	US 6 east (Pioneers Road)	Northern end of US 6 concurrency
Seward		60.54	97.43	I-80 – Lincoln, Grand Island	I-80 Exit 379
Seward	Seward	66.41	106.88	US 34 (Main Street)	
Seward		71.06	114.36	S-80C west (Branched Oak Road) – Staplehurst	
Seward		73.07	117.59	S-80B east (Rock Creek Road) – Bee	
Butler		78.06	125.63	N-66 east / S-12C west (Road 23) – Dwight, Valparaiso, Ulysses	
Butler		87.12	140.21	N-92 east (32 Road)	Southern end of N-92 concurrency
Butler		88.64	142.65	N-92 west (32 Road)	Northern end of N-92 concurrency
Butler		93.65	150.72	S-12B east (37 Road) – Bruno	
Butler		97.65	157.15	N-64 west (41 Road)	
Butler		104.63	168.39	S-12A east (45 Road) – Linwood	
Colfax	Schuyler	109.64	176.45	US 30	Interchange
Colfax		126.71	203.92	N-91 (Road W)	
Stanton		134.76	216.88	N-32 (828th Road)	
Stanton		147.77	237.81	US 275 west (841st Road)	Southern end of US 275 concurrency
Stanton		149.78	241.05	US 275 east	Northern end of US 275 concurrency
Wayne	Wayne	164.81	265.24	N-35 (7th Street)	
Dixon–Cedar county line		174.87	281.43	N-116 north – Concord	
Cedar	Laurel	180.24	290.07	US 20 west	Southern end of US 20 concurrency
Cedar		182.75	294.11	US 20 east – South Sioux City	Northern end of US 20 concurrency
Cedar		183.19	294.82	N-59 (872nd Road) to US 20	N-59 east is former L-14D
Cedar		193.18	310.89	N-84 west (882nd Road)	
Cedar		199.45	320.98	N-12 west (890th Road)	Southern end of N-12 concurrency
Dixon		207.16	333.39	N-12 east	Northern end of N-12 concurrency
Missouri River		210.11	338.14	Vermillion–Newcastle Bridge	
Missouri River		210.11	338.14	SD 19 north	Continuation into South Dakota
1.000 mi = 1.609 km; 1.000 km = 0.621 mi: Concurrency terminus
