= Hoskins Field (Texas) =

Baseball park in Texas, United States

Coordinates: 33.8554°N 98.57985°W

Hoskins Field is a baseball park in Wichita Falls, Texas, and was the home of the TCL Wichita Falls Roughnecks for the 2007 season. Before the team moved to Wichita Falls, it was called the Graham Roughnecks and belonged to Graham, Texas.

It was named after minor league baseball player from Wichita Falls named Homer Edward “Flip” Hoskins who was born in 1908 and died in 1984 at the age of 76. He's buried in Wichita Falls, TX. The field is now used by high schools in Wichita Falls.
