= Hoskins, Nebraska =

Village in Wayne County, Nebraska, United States

- Village
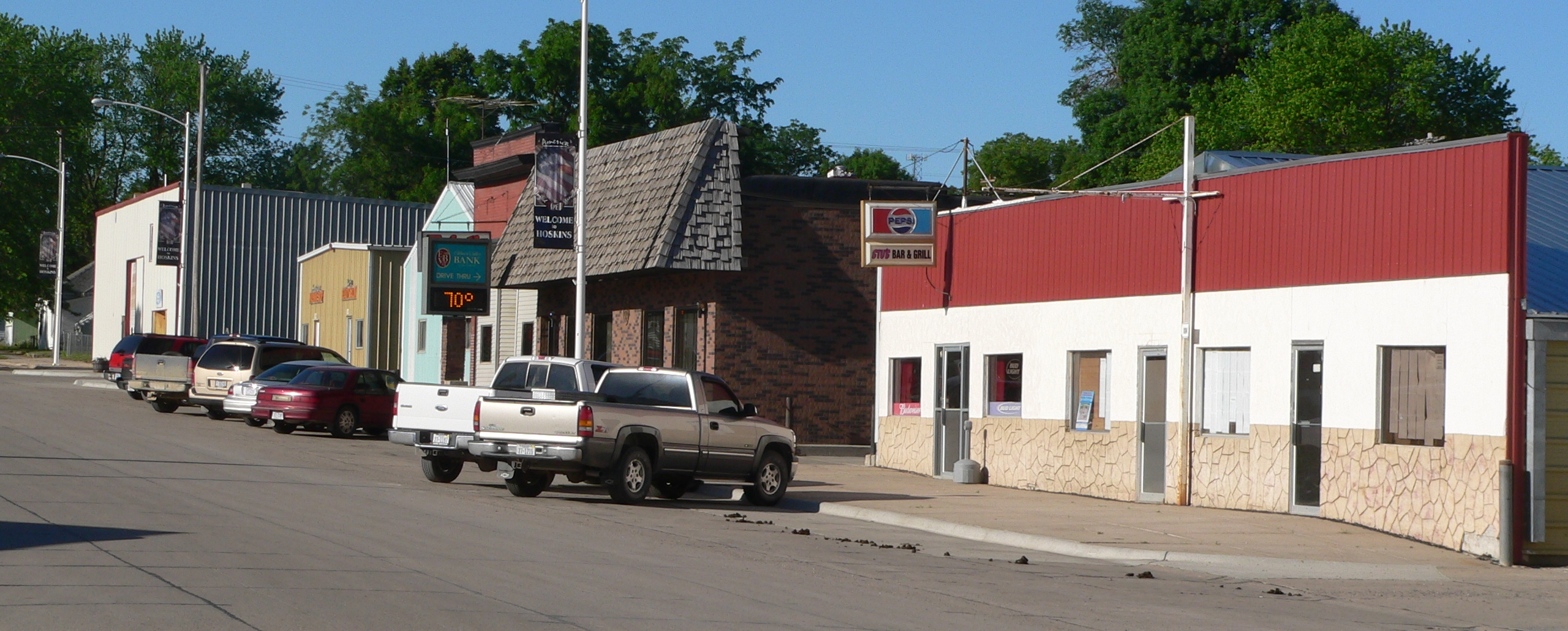
- Downtown Hoskins: west side of Main Street, June 2010

- Location of Hoskins, Nebraska
- Coordinates: 42°06′45″N 97°18′16″W
- Country: United States
- State: Nebraska
- County: Wayne

Area
  - Total: 0.31 sq mi (0.80 km^{2})
  - Land: 0.31 sq mi (0.80 km^{2})
  - Water: 0 sq mi (0.00 km^{2})
- Elevation: 1,677 ft (511 m)

Population (2020)
  - Total: 267
  - Estimate (2021): 269
  - Density: 860/sq mi (330/km^{2})
- Time zone: UTC-6 (Central (CST))
  - Summer (DST): UTC-5 (CDT)
- ZIP code: 68740
- Area code: 402
- FIPS code: 31-23235
- GNIS feature ID: 2398546
- Website: hoskinsne.com

Hoskins is a village in Wayne County, Nebraska, United States. The population was 267 at the 2020 census.

== History ==
Hoskins was established in 1881 when the railroad was extended to that point. It was named for the father-in-law of F. H. Peavey.

== Geography ==
According to the United States Census Bureau, the village has a total area of 0.31 square miles (0.80 km^{2}), all land.

== Demographics ==
Historical population
Census	Pop.	Note	%±
1900	175		—
1910	262		49.7%
1920	274		4.6%
1930	255		−6.9%
1940	212		−16.9%
1950	171		−19.3%
1960	179		4.7%
1970	271		51.4%
1980	306		12.9%
1990	307		0.3%
2000	283		−7.8%
2010	285		0.7%
2020	263		−7.7%
U.S. Decennial Census

=== 2010 census ===
As of the census of 2010, there were 285 people, 111 households, and 84 families residing in the village. The population density was 919.4 inhabitants per square mile (355.0/km^{2}). There were 121 housing units at an average density of 390.3 per square mile (150.7/km^{2}). The racial makeup of the village was 98.2% White, 0.4% Asian, 0.4% from other races, and 1.1% from two or more races. Hispanic or Latino of any race were 3.9% of the population.

There were 111 households, of which 28.8% had children under the age of 18 living with them, 66.7% were married couples living together, 7.2% had a female householder with no husband present, 1.8% had a male householder with no wife present, and 24.3% were non-families. 21.6% of all households were made up of individuals, and 5.4% had someone living alone who was 65 years of age or older. The average household size was 2.57 and the average family size was 2.95.

The median age in the village was 38.2 years. 24.9% of residents were under the age of 18; 8.1% were between the ages of 18 and 24; 25.7% were from 25 to 44; 28% were from 45 to 64; and 13.3% were 65 years of age or older. The gender makeup of the village was 52.3% male and 47.7% female.

=== 2000 census ===
As of the census of 2000, there were 283 people, 112 households, and 80 families residing in the village. The population density was 938.9 inhabitants per square mile (362.5/km^{2}). There were 117 housing units at an average density of 388.2 per square mile (149.9/km^{2}). The racial makeup of the village was 99.65% White, and 0.35% from two or more races. Hispanic or Latino of any race were 0.35% of the population.

There were 112 households, out of which 41.1% had children under the age of 18 living with them, 58.9% were married couples living together, 8.9% had a female householder with no husband present, and 27.7% were non-families. 25.9% of all households were made up of individuals, and 10.7% had someone living alone who was 65 years of age or older. The average household size was 2.53 and the average family size was 3.07.

In the village, the population was spread out, with 31.4% under the age of 18, 7.8% from 18 to 24, 25.4% from 25 to 44, 20.1% from 45 to 64, and 15.2% who were 65 years of age or older. The median age was 35 years. For every 100 females, there were 95.2 males. For every 100 females age 18 and over, there were 100.0 males.

As of 2000 the median income for a household in the village was $27,679, and the median income for a family was $39,583. Males had a median income of $24,063 versus $22,596 for females. The per capita income for the village was $14,526. About 5.3% of families and 5.6% of the population were below the poverty line, including 8.7% of those under the age of eighteen and 4.4% of those 65 or over.

== Government ==
Hoskins is led by a village board. The chair of the village board, Hoskins' equivalent of mayor, is James (Jim) A. Miller.

== Education ==
Trinity Lutheran School is a Christian school of the Wisconsin Evangelical Lutheran Synod in Hoskins.

== See also ==
- List of municipalities in Nebraska
