= Wakefield, Nebraska =

City in Dixon and Wayne counties in Nebraska, United States

- City
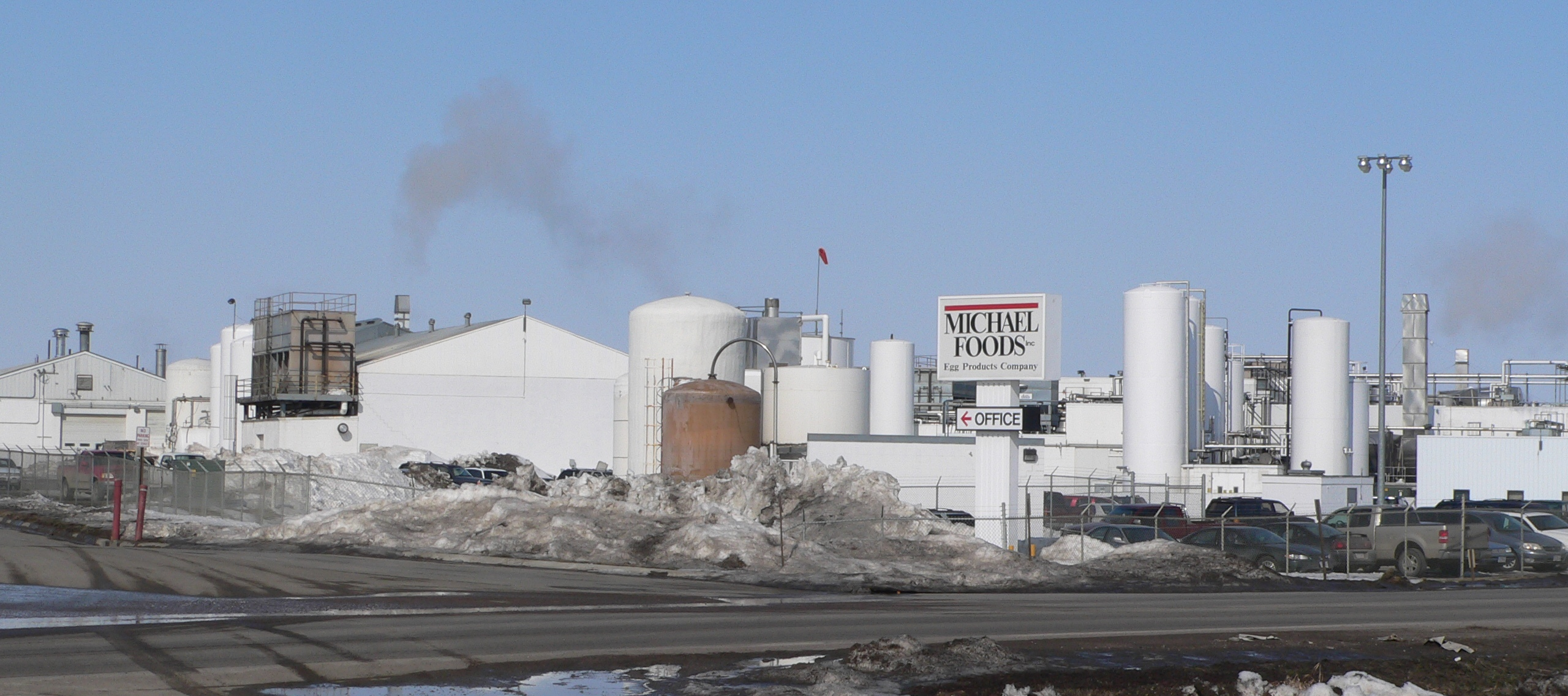
- Michael Foods egg-processing plant in Wakefield, March 2010

- Location of Wakefield, Nebraska
- Coordinates: 42°16′00″N 96°51′47″W
- Country: United States
- State: Nebraska
- Counties: Dixon, Wayne

Area
  - Total: 1.13 sq mi (2.93 km^{2})
  - Land: 1.06 sq mi (2.75 km^{2})
  - Water: 0.069 sq mi (0.18 km^{2})
- Elevation: 1,391 ft (424 m)

Population (2020)
  - Total: 1,522
  - Density: 1,432.6/sq mi (553.13/km^{2})
- Time zone: UTC-6 (Central (CST))
  - Summer (DST): UTC-5 (CDT)
- ZIP code: 68784
- Area code: 402
- FIPS code: 31-51070
- GNIS feature ID: 2397168
- Website: www.wakefieldne.com

Wakefield is a city in Dixon and Wayne counties in Nebraska, United States. As of the 2020 census, Wakefield had a population of 1,522.

The Dixon County portion of Wakefield is part of the Sioux City metropolitan area.

== History ==
Wakefield got its start in the year 1881, following construction of the Chicago, St. Paul, Minneapolis and Omaha Railway through the territory. It was named for L. W. Wakefield, a railroad engineer. Wakefield was incorporated in 1883.

== Demographics ==
Historical population
Census	Pop.	Note	%±
1900	755		—
1910	861		14.0%
1920	1,114		29.4%
1930	1,112		−0.2%
1940	961		−13.6%
1950	1,027		6.9%
1960	1,068		4.0%
1970	1,160		8.6%
1980	1,125		−3.0%
1990	1,082		−3.8%
2000	1,411		30.4%
2010	1,451		2.8%
2020	1,522		4.9%
U.S. Decennial Census

=== 2010 census ===
As of the census of 2010, there were 1,451 people, 534 households, and 352 families living in the city. The population density was 1,667.8 inhabitants per square mile (643.9/km^{2}). There were 575 housing units at an average density of 660.9 per square mile (255.2/km^{2}). The racial makeup of the city was 75.6% White, 0.4% African American, 0.5% Native American, 0.5% Asian, 0.1% Pacific Islander, 21.4% from other races, and 1.5% from two or more races. Hispanic or Latino of any race were 33.6% of the population.

There were 534 households, of which 32.4% had children under the age of 18 living with them, 51.7% were married couples living together, 9.6% had a female householder with no husband present, 4.7% had a male householder with no wife present, and 34.1% were non-families. 30.0% of all households were made up of individuals, and 17.2% had someone living alone who was 65 years of age or older. The average household size was 2.64 and the average family size was 3.23.

The median age in the city was 38 years. 25.7% of residents were under the age of 18; 9.7% were between the ages of 18 and 24; 22.8% were from 25 to 44; 23.1% were from 45 to 64; and 18.5% were 65 years of age or older. The gender makeup of the city was 47.6% male and 52.4% female.

=== 2000 census ===
As of the census of 2000, there were 1,411 people, 522 households, and 346 families living in the city. The population density was 2,020.4 inhabitants per square mile (780.1/km^{2}). There were 558 housing units at an average density of 799.0 per square mile (308.5/km^{2}). The racial makeup of the city was 83.63% White, 1.13% Native American, 0.43% Asian, 13.68% from other races, and 1.13% from two or more races. Hispanic or Latino of any race were 17.43% of the population.

There were 522 households, out of which 32.4% had children under the age of 18 living with them, 54.0% were married couples living together, 9.4% had a female householder with no husband present, and 33.7% were non-families. 30.7% of all households were made up of individuals, and 19.9% had someone living alone who was 65 years of age or older. The average household size was 2.59 and the average family size was 3.25.

In the city, the population was spread out, with 27.2% under the age of 18, 8.1% from 18 to 24, 24.9% from 25 to 44, 18.3% from 45 to 64, and 21.5% who were 65 years of age or older. The median age was 38 years. For every 100 females, there were 88.9 males. For every 100 females age 18 and over, there were 85.0 males.

As of 2000 the median income for a household in the city was $32,308, and the median income for a family was $41,429. Males had a median income of $26,607 versus $20,789 for females. The per capita income for the city was $15,830. About 5.6% of families and 7.2% of the population were below the poverty line, including 7.8% of those under age 18 and 9.4% of those age 65 or over.

== Economy ==
The largest employer in Wakefield is the Michael Foods egg-processing plant, with 800 employees. Other major employers include Wakefield Health Care Center, a nursing home with 65 employees; Wakefield Public School, with 55 employees; Central Valley Ag, a supplier of fertilizer and farm supplies, with 20 employees; and Roses Transport, a freight-hauling company with 17 employees.

== Geography ==
According to the United States Census Bureau, the city has a total area of 0.94 square miles (2.43 km^{2}), of which 0.87 square miles (2.25 km^{2}) is land and 0.07 square miles (0.18 km^{2}) is water.

=== Climate ===
Climate data for Wakefield, Nebraska (1991−2020 normals, extremes 1897−present)
Month	Jan	Feb	Mar	Apr	May	Jun	Jul	Aug	Sep	Oct	Nov	Dec	Year
Record high °F (°C)	73 (23)	73 (23)	89 (32)	101 (38)	109 (43)	108 (42)	115 (46)	110 (43)	103 (39)	96 (36)	83 (28)	72 (22)	115 (46)
Mean maximum °F (°C)	53.9 (12.2)	58.8 (14.9)	73.9 (23.3)	83.3 (28.5)	90.7 (32.6)	95.2 (35.1)	95.7 (35.4)	93.9 (34.4)	90.9 (32.7)	85.6 (29.8)	70.7 (21.5)	55.2 (12.9)	98.3 (36.8)
Mean daily maximum °F (°C)	31.7 (−0.2)	36.9 (2.7)	49.8 (9.9)	62.8 (17.1)	73.3 (22.9)	83.0 (28.3)	86.3 (30.2)	84.1 (28.9)	78.3 (25.7)	65.1 (18.4)	48.2 (9.0)	35.1 (1.7)	61.2 (16.2)
Daily mean °F (°C)	20.6 (−6.3)	25.3 (−3.7)	36.7 (2.6)	48.5 (9.2)	59.7 (15.4)	70.0 (21.1)	73.4 (23.0)	71.3 (21.8)	63.9 (17.7)	51.1 (10.6)	35.9 (2.2)	24.3 (−4.3)	48.4 (9.1)
Mean daily minimum °F (°C)	9.5 (−12.5)	13.7 (−10.2)	23.7 (−4.6)	34.2 (1.2)	46.1 (7.8)	57.1 (13.9)	60.6 (15.9)	58.5 (14.7)	49.6 (9.8)	37.2 (2.9)	23.5 (−4.7)	13.6 (−10.2)	35.6 (2.0)
Mean minimum °F (°C)	−13.6 (−25.3)	−8.0 (−22.2)	2.8 (−16.2)	18.2 (−7.7)	31.9 (−0.1)	45.9 (7.7)	50.5 (10.3)	48.2 (9.0)	33.6 (0.9)	19.1 (−7.2)	4.7 (−15.2)	−7.2 (−21.8)	−17.6 (−27.6)
Record low °F (°C)	−41 (−41)	−38 (−39)	−22 (−30)	−4 (−20)	19 (−7)	32 (0)	40 (4)	33 (1)	17 (−8)	0 (−18)	−18 (−28)	−28 (−33)	−41 (−41)
Average precipitation inches (mm)	0.74 (19)	0.95 (24)	1.67 (42)	3.33 (85)	4.12 (105)	5.03 (128)	3.13 (80)	3.72 (94)	3.01 (76)	2.50 (64)	1.40 (36)	1.09 (28)	30.69 (780)
Average snowfall inches (cm)	6.9 (18)	8.1 (21)	5.6 (14)	2.8 (7.1)	0.0 (0.0)	0.0 (0.0)	0.0 (0.0)	0.0 (0.0)	0.0 (0.0)	0.6 (1.5)	3.6 (9.1)	7.9 (20)	35.5 (90)
Average precipitation days (≥ 0.01 in)	5.5	5.4	6.7	9.8	11.8	10.5	9.4	9.3	7.6	7.2	5.3	5.7	94.2
Average snowy days (≥ 0.1 in)	4.9	4.7	2.8	1.5	0.0	0.0	0.0	0.0	0.0	0.6	2.0	4.7	21.2
Source: NOAA

== See also ==
- List of municipalities in Nebraska
