= Stanton, Nebraska =

Village in and county seat of Stanton County, Nebraska, United States

- City
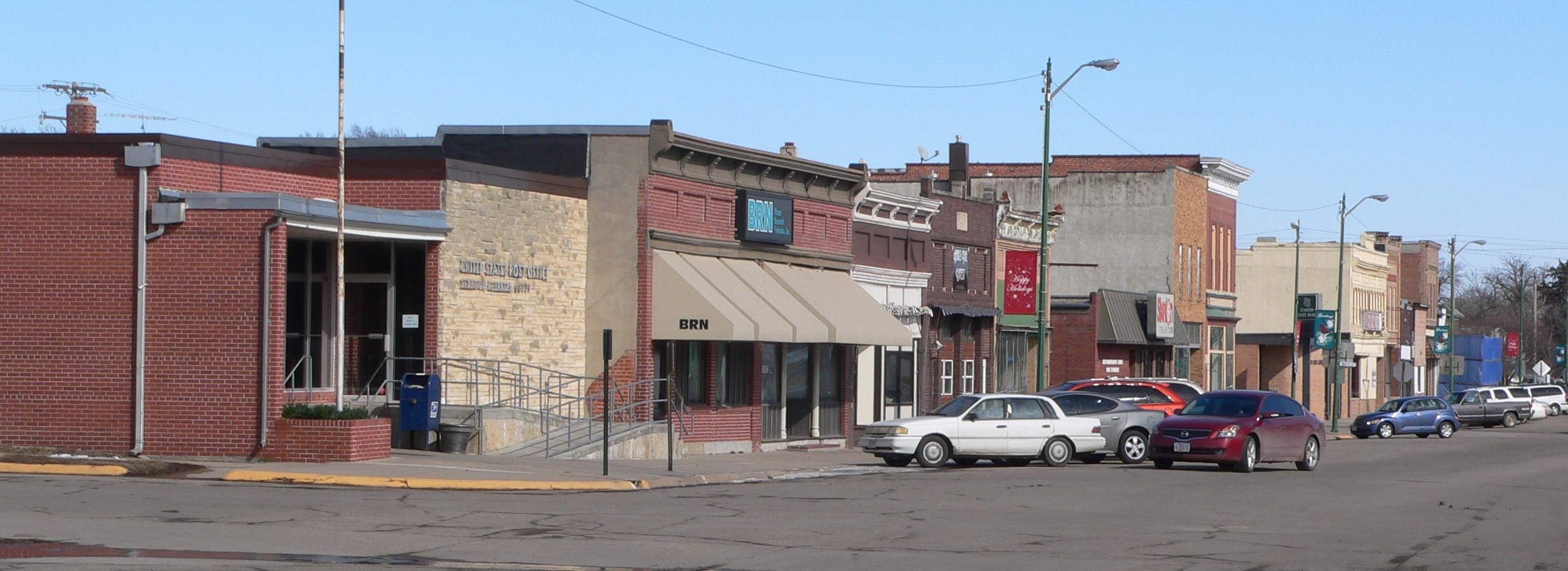
- Downtown Stanton: north side of Ivy Street east of 11th Street

- Location of Stanton within Stanton County and Nebraska
- Coordinates: 41°56′50″N 97°13′02″W
- Country: United States
- State: Nebraska
- County: Stanton

Area
  - Total: 1.74 sq mi (4.50 km^{2})
  - Land: 1.74 sq mi (4.50 km^{2})
  - Water: 0 sq mi (0.00 km^{2})
- Elevation: 1,450 ft (440 m)

Population (2020)
  - Total: 1,520
  - Density: 874.3/sq mi (337.55/km^{2})
- Time zone: UTC-6 (Central (CST))
  - Summer (DST): UTC-5 (CDT)
- ZIP code: 68779
- Area code: 402
- FIPS code: 31-46800
- GNIS feature ID: 2395953
- Website: stanton.net

Stanton is a city in Stanton County, Nebraska, United States. As of the 2020 census, Stanton had a population of 1,520. It is the county seat of Stanton County. Stanton was platted in 1870. Both the city and county are named after Edwin Stanton, secretary of war for president Abraham Lincoln during the American Civil War.

== Geography ==
According to the United States Census Bureau, the city has a total area of 1.74 square miles (4.51 km^{2}), all land.

== Demographics ==
Historical population
Census	Pop.	Note	%±
1880	248		—
1890	857		245.6%
1900	1,052		22.8%
1910	1,342		27.6%
1920	1,487		10.8%
1930	1,479		−0.5%
1940	1,526		3.2%
1950	1,403		−8.1%
1960	1,317		−6.1%
1970	1,363		3.5%
1980	1,603		17.6%
1990	1,549		−3.4%
2000	1,627		5.0%
2010	1,577		−3.1%
2020	1,520		−3.6%
U.S. Decennial Census

Stanton is part of the Norfolk, Nebraska Micropolitan Statistical Area.

=== 2010 census ===
As of the census of 2010, there were 1,577 people, 668 households, and 424 families residing in the city. The population density was 906.3 inhabitants per square mile (349.9/km^{2}). There were 730 housing units at an average density of 419.5 per square mile (162.0/km^{2}). The racial makeup of the city was 95.6% White, 0.7% African American, 0.3% Native American, 0.3% Asian, 1.6% from other races, and 1.5% from two or more races. Hispanic or Latino of any race were 3.4% of the population.

There were 668 households, of which 30.8% had children under the age of 18 living with them, 50.9% were married couples living together, 9.0% had a female householder with no husband present, 3.6% had a male householder with no wife present, and 36.5% were non-families. 33.1% of all households were made up of individuals, and 18.7% had someone living alone who was 65 years of age or older. The average household size was 2.36 and the average family size was 3.00.

The median age in the city was 42 years. 27.7% of residents were under the age of 18; 4.3% were between the ages of 18 and 24; 21.4% were from 25 to 44; 26% were from 45 to 64; and 20.7% were 65 years of age or older. The gender makeup of the city was 46.4% male and 53.6% female.

=== 2000 census ===
As of the census of 2000, there were 1,627 people, 612 households, and 438 families residing in the city. The population density was 924.9 inhabitants per square mile (357.1/km^{2}). There were 653 housing units at an average density of 371.2 per square mile (143.3/km^{2}). The racial makeup of the city was 97.17% White, 0.18% African American, 0.55% Native American, 0.31% Asian, 1.11% from other races, and 0.68% from two or more races. Hispanic or Latino of any race were 2.40% of the population.

There were 612 households, out of which 33.3% had children under the age of 18 living with them, 58.2% were married couples living together, 10.5% had a female householder with no husband present, and 28.4% were non-families. 24.8% of all households were made up of individuals, and 13.7% had someone living alone who was 65 years of age or older. The average household size was 2.54 and the average family size was 3.02.

In the city, the population was spread out, with 25.9% under the age of 18, 8.3% from 18 to 24, 25.1% from 25 to 44, 19.5% from 45 to 64, and 21.2% who were 65 years of age or older. The median age was 40 years. For every 100 females, there were 89.6 males. For every 100 females age 18 and over, there were 81.7 males.

As of 2000 the median income for a household in the city was $33,462, and the median income for a family was $42,717. Males had a median income of $28,636 versus $20,221 for females. The per capita income for the city was $14,637. About 5.8% of families and 9.2% of the population were below the poverty line, including 10.7% of those under age 18 and 10.9% of those age 65 or over.

== See also ==
- List of municipalities in Nebraska
