= Emerson, Nebraska =

Village in Dakota, Dixon, and Thurston counties in Nebraska, United States

- Village
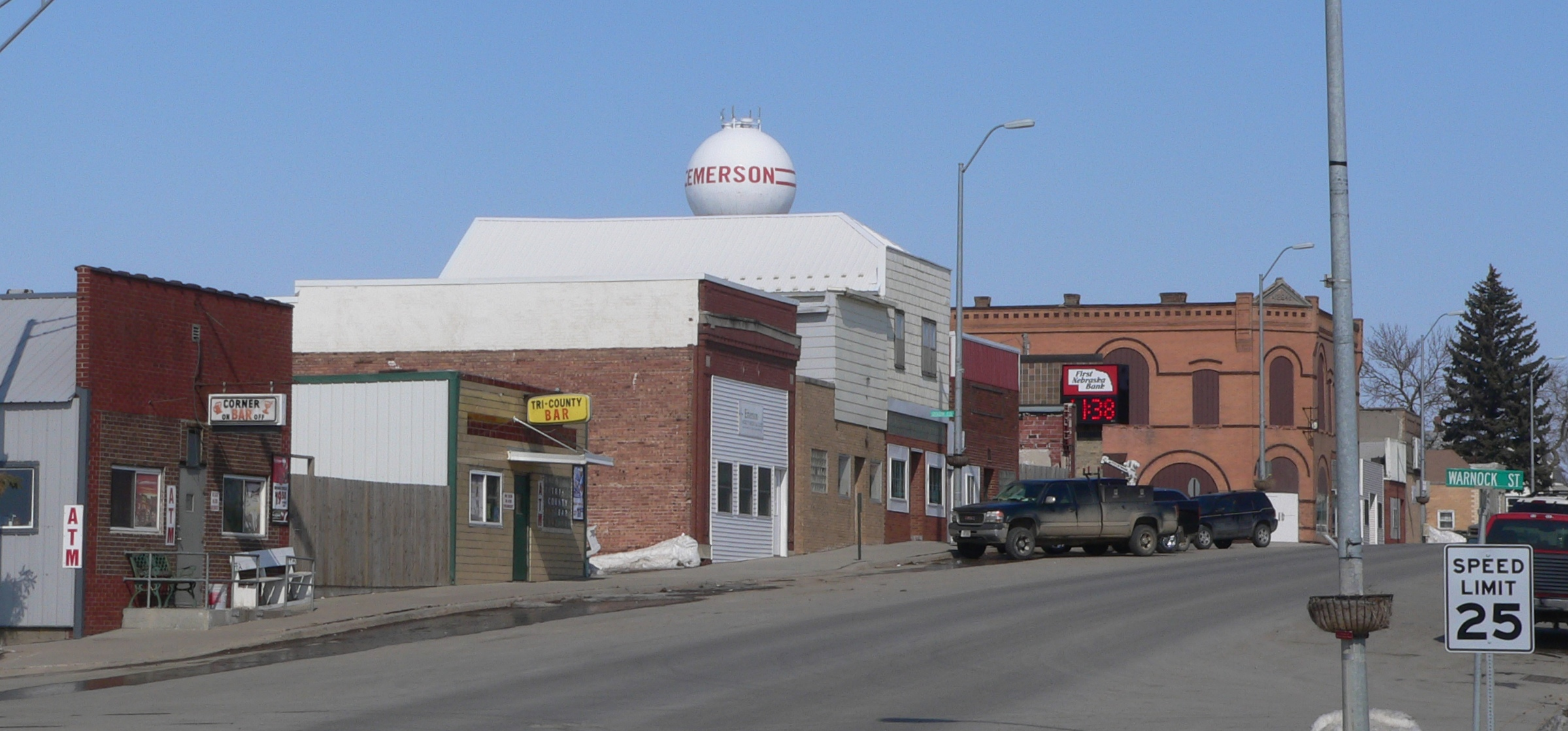
- Downtown Emerson: west side of Main Street (2010)

- Location of Emerson within Dixon County and Nebraska
- Coordinates: 42°16′42″N 96°43′35″W
- Country: United States
- State: Nebraska
- Counties: Dixon, Dakota, Thurston

Area
  - Total: 0.47 sq mi (1.23 km^{2})
  - Land: 0.47 sq mi (1.23 km^{2})
  - Water: 0 sq mi (0.00 km^{2})
- Elevation: 1,496 ft (456 m)

Population (2020)
  - Total: 840
  - Density: 1,774.3/sq mi (685.08/km^{2})
- Time zone: UTC-6 (Central (CST))
  - Summer (DST): UTC-5 (CDT)
- ZIP code: 68733
- Area code: 402
- FIPS code: 31-15710
- GNIS ID: 2398827
- Website: emerson-ne.com

Emerson is a village in Dakota, Dixon, and Thurston counties in Nebraska, United States. As of the 2020 census, Emerson had a population of 840. Emerson is the only community in Nebraska that exists in three counties.

== History ==
Emerson was laid out in 1881 at an important rail junction. It was named in honor of the poet Ralph Waldo Emerson. Emerson was incorporated as a village in 1888.

== Geography ==
According to the United States Census Bureau, the village has a total area of 0.47 square miles (1.22 km^{2}), all land.

== Demographics ==
Historical population
Census	Pop.	Note	%±
1900	617		—
1910	838		35.8%
1920	864		3.1%
1930	891		3.1%
1940	879		−1.3%
1950	784		−10.8%
1960	803		2.4%
1970	850		5.9%
1980	874		2.8%
1990	791		−9.5%
2000	817		3.3%
2010	840		2.8%
2020	840		0.0%
U.S. Decennial Census

The Dakota and Dixon county portions of Emerson are part of the Sioux City metropolitan area.

=== 2010 census ===
As of the census of 2010, there were 840 people, 355 households, and 218 families living in the village. The population density was 1,787.2 inhabitants per square mile (690.0/km^{2}). There were 377 housing units at an average density of 802.1 per square mile (309.7/km^{2}). The racial makeup of the village was 96% White, 0.1% African American, 1.8% Native American, 0.1% Asian, 0.4% Pacific Islander, 0.5% from other races, and 1.2% from two or more races. Hispanic or Latino of any race were 5.6% of the population.

There were 355 households, of which 30.4% had children under the age of 18 living with them, 44.5% were married couples living together, 12.4% had a female householder with no husband present, 4.5% had a male householder with no wife present, and 38.6% were non-families. 36.1% of all households were made up of individuals, and 18.3% had someone living alone who was 65 years of age or older. The average household size was 2.27 and the average family size was 2.89.

The median age in the village was 41.6 years. 24.9% of residents were under the age of 18; 6.8% were between the ages of 18 and 24; 21.4% were from 25 to 44; 25% were from 45 to 64; and 22% were 65 years of age or older. The gender makeup of the village was 46% male and 54% female.

=== 2000 census ===
As of the census of 2000, there were 817 people, 320 households, and 209 families living in the village. The population density was 1,705.3 inhabitants per square mile (658.4/km^{2}). There were 358 housing units at an average density of 747.2 per square mile (288.5/km^{2}). The racial makeup of the village was 92.78% White, 0.98% Native American, 0.73% Asian, 5.14% from other races, and 0.37% from two or more races. Hispanic or Latino of any race were 5.51% of the population.

There were 329 households, out of which 31.6% had children under the age of 18 living with them, 53.5% were married couples living together, 7.6% had a female householder with no husband present, and 36.2% were non-families. 33.4% of all households were made up of individuals, and 19.5% had someone living alone who was 65 years of age or older. The average household size was 2.36, and the average family size was 2.97.

In the village, the population was spread out, with 26% under the age of 18, 7.1% from 18 to 24, 23.9% from 25 to 44, 17.9% from 45 to 64, and 26.2% who were 65 years of age or older. The median age was 40 years. For every 100 females, there were 92.7 males. For every 100 females age 18 and over, there were 86.9 males.

As of 2000 the median income for a household in the village was $27,411, and the median income for a family was $37,639. Males had a median income of $26,618 versus $18,833 for females. The per capita income for the village was $13,062. About 8.5% of the families and 11.3% of the population were below the poverty line, including 14.7% of those under age 18 and 12.4% of those age 65 or over.

== Notable people ==
- Craig Sams, founder of Green & Black's chocolate brand.
- Daniel E. Sheehan, American Roman Catholic archbishop.

== See also ==
- List of municipalities in Nebraska
