= Minatare, Nebraska =

Village in Scotts Bluff County, Nebraska, United States

Minatare, Nebraska mirita'ri
- City
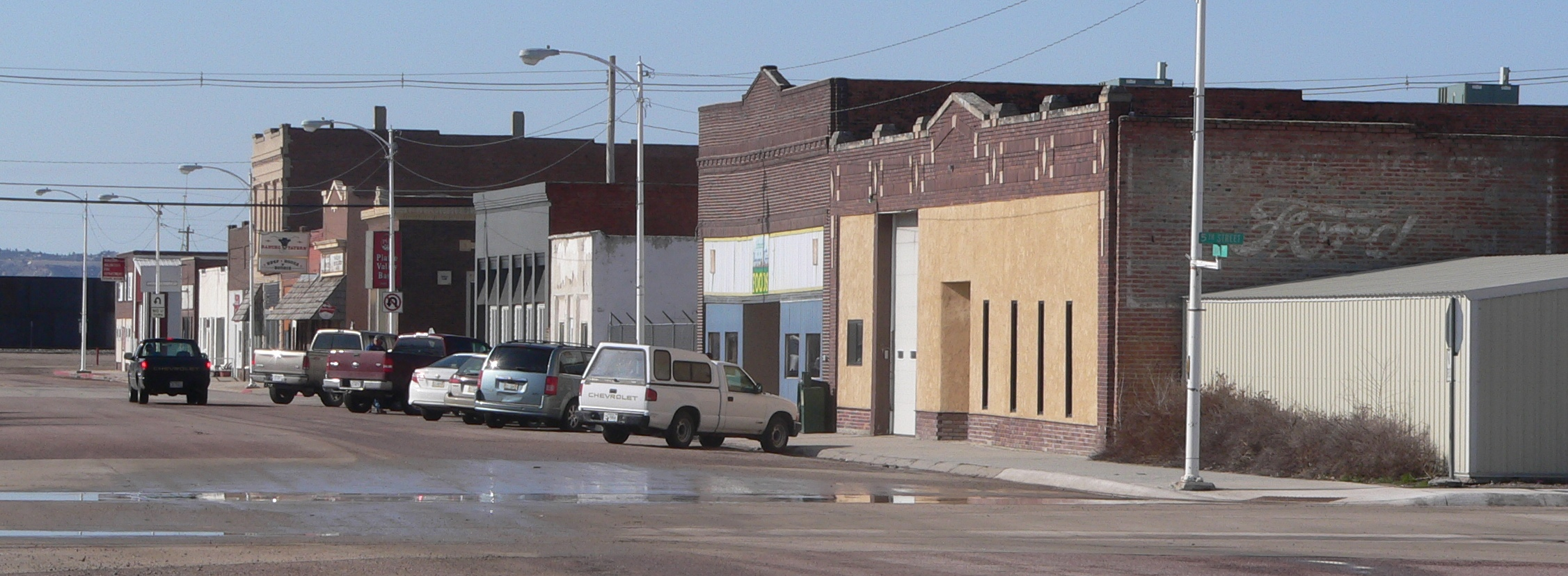
- Main Street in Minatare, April 2013

- Location of Minatare, Nebraska
- Coordinates: 41°48′41″N 103°30′03″W
- Country: United States
- State: Nebraska
- County: Scotts Bluff
- Incorporated: 1900

Area
  - Total: 0.44 sq mi (1.13 km^{2})
  - Land: 0.44 sq mi (1.13 km^{2})
  - Water: 0 sq mi (0.00 km^{2})
- Elevation: 3,822 ft (1,165 m)

Population (2020)
  - Total: 715
  - Density: 1,638.7/sq mi (632.71/km^{2})
- Time zone: UTC-7 (Mountain (MST))
  - Summer (DST): UTC-6 (MDT)
- ZIP code: 69356
- Area code: 308
- FIPS code: 31-32305
- GNIS feature ID: 2395338
- Website: cityofminatare.com

Minatare (Hidatsa: mirita'ri; "crosses the water") is a city in Scotts Bluff County, Nebraska, United States. It is part of the Scottsbluff, Nebraska Micropolitan Statistical Area. As of the 2020 census, Minatare had a population of 715.

== History ==
The community is named after a sub branch of Sioux Indians called "Minnataree" who lived in the area. The community was originally named "Tabor", and was established in 1887. The development of the area was based on the agriculture industry. The town moved and was renamed when the railroad bypassed Tabor in 1900. "Minnataree" is an Indian word meaning "clear water." The community incorporated in 1900.

== Geography ==
According to the United States Census Bureau, the city has a total area of 0.38 square miles (0.98 km^{2}), all land.

== Demographics ==
Historical population
Census	Pop.	Note	%±
1910	338		—
1920	660		95.3%
1930	1,079		63.5%
1940	1,125		4.3%
1950	890		−20.9%
1960	894		0.4%
1970	939		5.0%
1980	969		3.2%
1990	807		−16.7%
2000	810		0.4%
2010	816		0.7%
2020	715		−12.4%
U.S. Decennial Census

=== 2010 census ===
As of the census of 2010, there were 816 people, 309 households, and 206 families residing in the city. The population density was 2,147.4 inhabitants per square mile (829.1/km^{2}). There were 355 housing units at an average density of 934.2 per square mile (360.7/km^{2}). The racial makeup of the city was 78.6% White, 0.1% African American, 0.9% Native American, 0.9% Asian, 17.3% from other races, and 2.3% from two or more races. Hispanic or Latino of any race were 24.8% of the population.

There were 309 households, of which 35.0% had children under the age of 18 living with them, 46.6% were married couples living together, 11.3% had a female householder with no husband present, 8.7% had a male householder with no wife present, and 33.3% were non-families. 26.2% of all households were made up of individuals, and 11.7% had someone living alone who was 65 years of age or older. The average household size was 2.64 and the average family size was 3.19.

The median age in the city was 36 years. 28.7% of residents were under the age of 18; 10% were between the ages of 18 and 24; 22.6% were from 25 to 44; 24.3% were from 45 to 64; and 14.3% were 65 years of age or older. The gender makeup of the city was 50.9% male and 49.1% female.

=== 2000 census ===
As of the census of 2000, there were 810 people, 326 households, and 237 families residing in the city. The population density was 2,127.6 inhabitants per square mile (821.5/km^{2}). There were 356 housing units at an average density of 935.1 per square mile (361.0/km^{2}). The racial makeup of the city was 84.81% White, 0.25% African American, 1.23% Native American, 10.37% from other races, and 3.33% from two or more races. Hispanic or Latino of any race were 22.22% of the population.

There were 326 households, out of which 35.9% had children under the age of 18 living with them, 54.6% were married couples living together, 12.3% had a female householder with no husband present, and 27.3% were non-families. 24.5% of all households were made up of individuals, and 10.7% had someone living alone who was 65 years of age or older. The average household size was 2.48 and the average family size was 2.92.

In the city, the population was spread out, with 26.9% under the age of 18, 9.0% from 18 to 24, 26.9% from 25 to 44, 22.5% from 45 to 64, and 14.7% who were 65 years of age or older. The median age was 36 years. For every 100 females, there were 100.0 males. For every 100 females age 18 and over, there were 96.7 males.

As of 2000 the median income for a household in the city was $23,365, and the median income for a family was $30,156. Males had a median income of $21,823 versus $17,569 for females. The per capita income for the city was $11,977. About 18.4% of families and 18.6% of the population were below the poverty line, including 24.8% of those under age 18 and 11.6% of those age 65 or over.

== Arts and culture ==
=== Annual cultural events ===
Tabor Days is an annual event held in August and includes a 5k run/walk, parade, games and a craft fair.

== Tourism ==
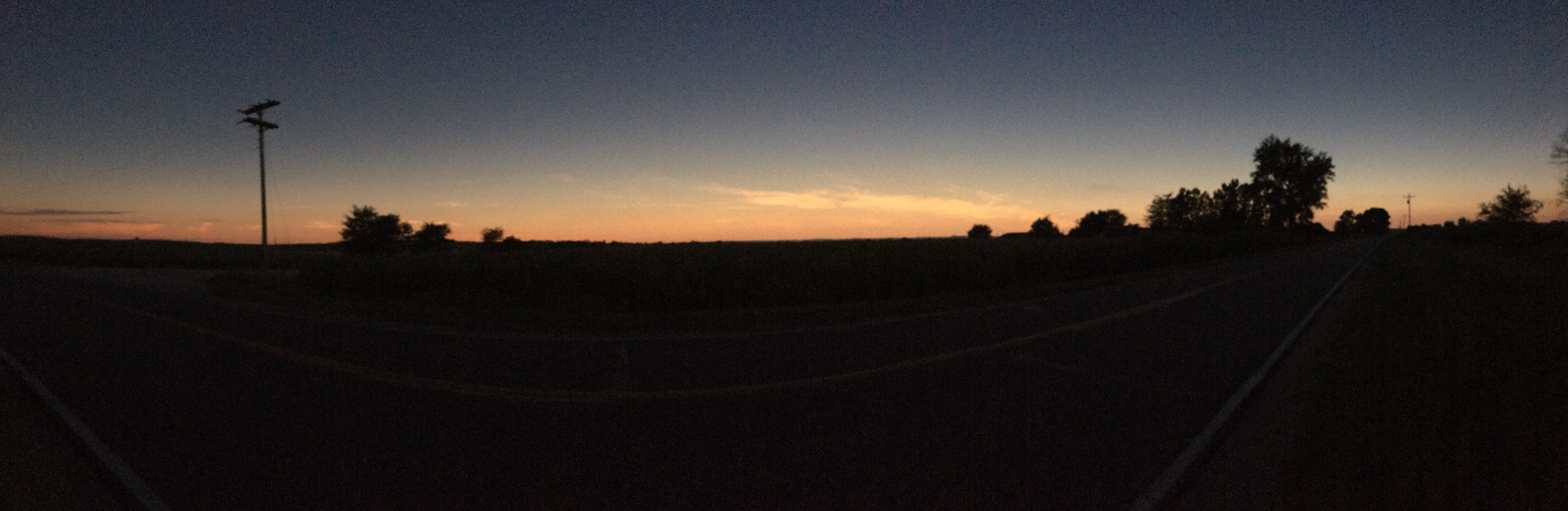
Minatare, NE at 11:49:36am, during solar eclipse totality on 08-21-17

The Lake Minatare State Recreation Area covers 2,970 acres and includes the Lake Minatare Lighthouse and a federal waterfowl refuge. The lake is the centerpiece of the North Platte National Wildlife Refuge.

On August 21, 2017, a total solar eclipse passed over most of the Nebraska Panhandle, including the town of Minatare. Visitors flocked to the area to see the eclipse.

== Education ==
Minatare is served by the Minatare Public Schools School District. The district has two schools, Minatare Elementary School and Minatare High School.

== Notable person ==
- John A. Nerud - Thoroughbred horse trainer and owner inducted into the National Museum of Racing and Hall of Fame in 1972.

== See also ==
- List of municipalities in Nebraska
