= Nebraska statistical areas =

Coordinates: 41.5378°N 99.7951°W

The U.S. State of Nebraska currently has 16 statistical areas that have been delineated by the Office of Management and Budget (OMB). On July 21, 2023, the OMB delineated three combined statistical areas, four metropolitan statistical areas, and nine micropolitan statistical areas in Nebraska. As of 2025, the largest of these is the Omaha–Fremont, NE-IA CSA, comprising the area around Nebraska's largest city, Omaha.

== Statistical areas ==
The Office of Management and Budget (OMB) has designated more than 1,000 statistical areas for the United States and Puerto Rico. These statistical areas are important geographic delineations of population clusters used by the OMB, the United States Census Bureau, planning organizations, and federal, state, and local government entities.

The OMB defines a core-based statistical area (CBSA) as the county or counties (or county-equivalents) surrounding at least one densely-settled core of at least 10,000 population, "plus adjacent counties having a high degree of social and economic integration with the core as measured through commuting ties with the counties containing the core". The OMB further divides a CBSA based on population into a metropolitan statistical area (MSA) for those with at least 50,000 people or a micropolitan statistical area (μSA) for those with 10,000 to 49,999 people.

The OMB defines a combined statistical area (CSA) as two or more adjacent CBSAs where the employment interchange rate (percent commuting from A to B plus percent commuting from B to A) is at least 15%. A primary statistical area (PSA) includes all CSAs and any CBSA that is not a constituent of a combined statistical area.

The 16 United States statistical areas and 93 counties of the State of Nebraska (Note: An out-of-state area and its population are displayed in green. An area that extends into more than one state is displayed in purple. A purple population number over a black population number show the total population versus the in-state population.)
Combined statistical area	2025 population (est.)	Core-based statistical area	2025 population (est.)	County	2025 population (est.)
Omaha–Fremont, NE-IA CSA	1,047,893; 925,481 (NE)	Omaha, NE-IA MSA	1,009,836; 887,424 (NE)	Douglas County, Nebraska	606,460
Omaha–Fremont, NE-IA CSA	1,047,893; 925,481 (NE)	Omaha, NE-IA MSA	1,009,836; 887,424 (NE)	Sarpy County, Nebraska	208,303
Omaha–Fremont, NE-IA CSA	1,047,893; 925,481 (NE)	Omaha, NE-IA MSA	1,009,836; 887,424 (NE)	Pottawattamie County, Iowa	92,996
Omaha–Fremont, NE-IA CSA	1,047,893; 925,481 (NE)	Omaha, NE-IA MSA	1,009,836; 887,424 (NE)	Cass County, Nebraska	27,657
Omaha–Fremont, NE-IA CSA	1,047,893; 925,481 (NE)	Omaha, NE-IA MSA	1,009,836; 887,424 (NE)	Saunders County, Nebraska	23,702
Omaha–Fremont, NE-IA CSA	1,047,893; 925,481 (NE)	Omaha, NE-IA MSA	1,009,836; 887,424 (NE)	Washington County, Nebraska	21,302
Omaha–Fremont, NE-IA CSA	1,047,893; 925,481 (NE)	Omaha, NE-IA MSA	1,009,836; 887,424 (NE)	Mills County, Iowa	14,793
Omaha–Fremont, NE-IA CSA	1,047,893; 925,481 (NE)	Omaha, NE-IA MSA	1,009,836; 887,424 (NE)	Harrison County, Iowa	14,623
Omaha–Fremont, NE-IA CSA	1,047,893; 925,481 (NE)	Fremont, NE μSA	38,057	Dodge County, Nebraska	38,057
Lincoln–Beatrice, NE CSA	373,792	Lincoln, NE MSA	352,081	Lancaster County, Nebraska	334,049
Lincoln–Beatrice, NE CSA	373,792	Lincoln, NE MSA	352,081	Seward County, Nebraska	18,032
Lincoln–Beatrice, NE CSA	373,792	Beatrice, NE μSA	21,711	Gage County, Nebraska	21,711
none		Grand Island, NE MSA	78,076	Hall County, Nebraska	63,633
none		Grand Island, NE MSA	78,076	Merrick County, Nebraska	7,905
none		Grand Island, NE MSA	78,076	Howard County, Nebraska	6,538
none		Kearney, NE μSA	57,962	Buffalo County, Nebraska	51,172
none		Kearney, NE μSA	57,962	Kearney County, Nebraska	6,790
none		Norfolk, NE μSA	49,228	Madison County, Nebraska	36,106
none		Norfolk, NE μSA	49,228	Pierce County, Nebraska	7,378
none		Norfolk, NE μSA	49,228	Stanton County, Nebraska	5,744
none		Columbus, NE μSA	46,583	Platte County, Nebraska	35,649
none		Columbus, NE μSA	46,583	Colfax County, Nebraska	10,934
none		Hastings, NE μSA	40,577	Adams County, Nebraska	31,071
none		Hastings, NE μSA	40,577	Clay County, Nebraska	6,170
none		Hastings, NE μSA	40,577	Webster County, Nebraska	3,336
none		Scottsbluff, NE μSA	36,272	Scotts Bluff County, Nebraska	35,586
none		Scottsbluff, NE μSA	36,272	Banner County, Nebraska	686
none		North Platte, NE μSA	33,972	Lincoln County, Nebraska	33,303
none		North Platte, NE μSA	33,972	Logan County, Nebraska	669
none		Lexington, NE μSA	26,255	Dawson County, Nebraska	24,452
none		Lexington, NE μSA	26,255	Gosper County, Nebraska	1,803
Sioux City–Le Mars, IA-NE-SD CSA	171,435; 21,687 (NE)	Sioux City, IA-NE-SD MSA	145,738; 21,687 (NE)	Woodbury County, Iowa	106,649
Sioux City–Le Mars, IA-NE-SD CSA	171,435; 21,687 (NE)	Sioux City, IA-NE-SD MSA	145,738; 21,687 (NE)	Dakota County, Nebraska	21,687
Sioux City–Le Mars, IA-NE-SD CSA	171,435; 21,687 (NE)	Sioux City, IA-NE-SD MSA	145,738; 21,687 (NE)	Union County, South Dakota	17,402
Sioux City–Le Mars, IA-NE-SD CSA	171,435; 21,687 (NE)	Le Mars, IA μSA	25,697	Plymouth County, Iowa	25,697
none				Otoe County, Nebraska	16,531
none				Saline County, Nebraska	14,996
none				York County, Nebraska	14,564
none				Custer County, Nebraska	10,500
none				Box Butte County, Nebraska	10,494
none				Red Willow County, Nebraska	10,307
none				Holt County, Nebraska	10,067
none				Wayne County, Nebraska	10,020
none				Hamilton County, Nebraska	9,678
none				Cheyenne County, Nebraska	9,528
none				Phelps County, Nebraska	8,994
none				Cuming County, Nebraska	8,823
none				Butler County, Nebraska	8,507
none				Cedar County, Nebraska	8,373
none				Knox County, Nebraska	8,335
none				Keith County, Nebraska	8,100
none				Dawes County, Nebraska	7,858
none				Richardson County, Nebraska	7,530
none				Nemaha County, Nebraska	7,102
none				Jefferson County, Nebraska	7,070
none				Thurston County, Nebraska	6,752
none				Burt County, Nebraska	6,678
none				Antelope County, Nebraska	6,352
none				Dixon County, Nebraska	5,602
none				Cherry County, Nebraska	5,561
none				Fillmore County, Nebraska	5,458
none				Boone County, Nebraska	5,355
none				Polk County, Nebraska	5,270
none				Johnson County, Nebraska	5,218
none				Thayer County, Nebraska	4,842
none				Sheridan County, Nebraska	4,809
none				Furnas County, Nebraska	4,524
none				Morrill County, Nebraska	4,404
none				Nuckolls County, Nebraska	4,100
none				Valley County, Nebraska	4,094
none				Chase County, Nebraska	3,718
none				Kimball County, Nebraska	3,391
none				Nance County, Nebraska	3,290
none				Harlan County, Nebraska	3,000
none				Sherman County, Nebraska	2,924
none				Perkins County, Nebraska	2,849
none				Brown County, Nebraska	2,826
none				Franklin County, Nebraska	2,795
none				Frontier County, Nebraska	2,655
none				Pawnee County, Nebraska	2,510
none				Hitchcock County, Nebraska	2,467
none				Greeley County, Nebraska	2,154
none				Deuel County, Nebraska	1,862
none				Garden County, Nebraska	1,804
none				Garfield County, Nebraska	1,710
none				Boyd County, Nebraska	1,674
none				Dundy County, Nebraska	1,568
none				Rock County, Nebraska	1,259
none				Sioux County, Nebraska	1,188
none				Hayes County, Nebraska	821
none				Keya Paha County, Nebraska	792
none				Wheeler County, Nebraska	789
none				Hooker County, Nebraska	686
none				Thomas County, Nebraska	639
none				Loup County, Nebraska	570
none				Grant County, Nebraska	561
none				Blaine County, Nebraska	458
none				Arthur County, Nebraska	396
none				McPherson County, Nebraska	369
State of Nebraska					2,018,006

The 13 core-based statistical areas of the State of Nebraska (Note: For CBSAs comprising populations from multiple states, they are listed twice to show both their intrastate population within that CBSA as well as the CBSA's total population. Only the intrastate population is ranked.)
2025 rank	Core-based statistical area	Population				
2025 rank	Core-based statistical area	2025 estimate	Change	2020 Census	Change	2010 Census
1	Omaha, NE-IA MSA (NE)	887,424	+5.04%	844,871	+13.83%	742,205
2	Lincoln, NE MSA	352,081	+3.49%	340,217	+12.60%	302,157
3	Grand Island, NE MSA	78,076	+1.35%	77,038	+5.93%	72,726
4	Kearney, NE μSA	57,962	+2.10%	56,772	+7.95%	52,591
5	Norfolk, NE μSA	49,228	+0.99%	48,744	+0.98%	48,271
6	Columbus, NE μSA	46,583	+3.80%	44,878	+4.97%	42,752
7	Hastings, NE μSA	40,577	−0.31%	40,704	−2.43%	41,718
8	Fremont, NE μSA	38,057	+2.39%	37,167	+1.30%	36,691
9	Scottsbluff, NE μSA	36,272	−1.32%	36,758	−2.40%	37,660
10	North Platte, NE μSA	33,972	−4.01%	35,392	−4.48%	37,051
11	Lexington, NE μSA	26,255	+0.97%	26,004	−1.39%	26,370
12	Beatrice, NE μSA	21,711	+0.03%	21,704	−2.72%	22,311
13	Sioux City, IA-NE-SD MSA (NE)	21,687	+0.49%	21,582	+2.74%	21,006
	Omaha, NE-IA MSA	1,009,836	+4.36%	967,604	+11.82%	865,350
	Sioux City, IA-NE-SD CSA	145,738	+0.97%	144,334	+4.91%	137,577

The three combined statistical areas of the State of Nebraska (Note: For CSAs comprising populations from multiple states, they are listed twice to show both their intrastate population within that CSA as well as the CSA's total population. Only the intrastate population is ranked.)
2025 rank	Combined statistical area	Population				
2025 rank	Combined statistical area	2025 estimate	Change	2020 Census	Change	2010 Census
1	Omaha–Fremont, NE-IA CSA (NE)	925,481	+4.93%	882,038	+13.24%	778,896
2	Lincoln–Beatrice, NE CSA	373,792	+3.28%	361,921	+11.54%	324,468
3	Sioux City–Le Mars, IA-NE-SD CSA (NE)	21,687	+0.49%	21,582	+2.74%	21,006
	Omaha–Fremont, NE-IA CSA	1,047,893	+4.29%	1,004,771	+11.39%	902,041
	Sioux City–Le Mars, IA-NE-SD CSA	171,435	+0.83%	170,032	+4.59%	162,563

== See also ==
- Geography of Nebraska
  - Demographics of Nebraska
