= Richard Banta =

American architect

Richard Albert Banta (July 7, 1925 – February 9, 2007) was an American architect born in Morrill, Nebraska, who designed houses in Los Angeles, California.
