= Royce Wallace =

American actress

- Wallace in Take a Giant Step, 1959.
- Born: Royce K. Wallace; May 9, 1925; Buffalo, Nebraska, U.S. or Pleasanton, Nebraska, U.S. or Cleveland, Ohio, U.S. (sources differ)
- Died: November 24, 1992 (aged 67); Ventura, California, United States
- Occupations: Actress; singer; dancer
- Years active: 1942–1991
- Spouses: Alexander Outerbridge (m. 1956; div. 1958) Bill Riley (m. 1960)

Royce K. Wallace (May 9, 1925 – November 24, 1992) was an American actress, singer and dancer who had a long, distinguished career beginning in the 1940s through the late–1980s.

== Biography ==
Born in Buffalo, Nebraska or Pleasanton, Nebraska or Cleveland, Ohio (sources differ), Wallace began her acting career on Broadway. Wallace received her first role as a dancer in Carmen Jones in 1943 which ran on Broadway for two years. Wallace appeared in productions throughout the 1940s, 1950s and 1960s such as Funny Girl in 1964. In the 1960s, Wallace was a founding co-member of the Cambridge Players theatrical group, a group which included some of the distinguished black actresses such as Esther Rolle (of Good Times TV show fame), Lynn Hamilton (who starred as "Donna" on the hit NBC-TV sitcom Sanford and Son), and Helen Martin of NBC-TV's 227.

Wallace later appeared mostly in guest roles on Sanford and Son, Barnaby Jones, The Paper Chase, Benson, Soap, Quincy, M.E., and Roots: The Next Generations. Wallace also appeared as Agnes, in an episode of Barnaby Jones entitled “Theater Of Fear”, alongside actress Anne Francis.

=== Personal life and death ===
Wallace was married twice and had no children. On December 24, 1956, Wallace married Bermuda socialite Alexander Stuart Outerbridge. Wallace later filed for divorce from Outerbridge in December 1958. In 1960, Wallace married New York City fireman Bill Riley. Wallace died on November 24, 1992, in Ventura, California, at the age of 67.

== Filmography ==
Year	Title	Role	Notes
1959	Take a Giant Step	Rose Thompson	
1969	Goodbye, Columbus	Carlotta	
1972	Cool Breeze	Emma Mercer	
1974	Willie Dynamite	Willie's Mother (Emma)	
1975	Funny Lady	Adele	
1986	Wildcats	Judge	
1986	Crossroads	Hotel Proprietress	
1989	Immediate Family	Nurse	
