= Simeon T. Josselyn =

American Civil War soldier

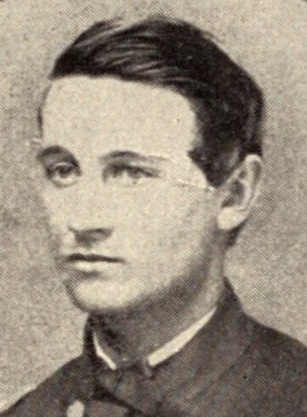
- From Volume 1 of 1902's Deeds of Valor
- Born: January 14, 1842; Buffalo, New York, US
- Died: April 4, 1905 (aged 63); Skagway, Alaska, US
- Burial place: Forest Lawn Memorial Park, Omaha, Nebraska, US
- Spouse: Henrietta E. "Ettie" Cutler (m. 1869–1905, his death)
- Children: 2
- Military career
- Allegiance: United States (Union)
- Branch: Union Army
- Service years: 1861–1864
- Rank: First lieutenant
- Units: Company C, 13th Illinois Infantry Regiment
- Conflicts: American Civil War: Battle of Missionary Ridge

Simeon T. Josselyn (January 14, 1842 – April 4, 1905) was a first lieutenant in the Union Army who was awarded the Medal of Honor for his actions during the American Civil War at the Battle of Missionary Ridge.

== Biography ==
Simeon Truman Josselyn was born in Buffalo, New York on January 14, 1842, the son of Samuel J. Josselyn and Rebecca (Teachout) Josselyn. He enlisted in the Union Army on April 21, 1861 in Amboy, Illinois. He rose to the rank of sergeant before receiving his second lieutenant's commission in November 1862. He was promoted to first lieutenant in November 1863 and discharged in June 1864.

He was awarded the medal "for extraordinary heroism on 25 November 1863, while serving with Company C, 13th Illinois Infantry, in action at Missionary Ridge, Tennessee. While commanding his company, deployed as skirmishers, First Lieutenant Josselyn came upon a large body of the enemy, taking a number of them prisoner. Lieutenant Josselyn himself shot their Color Bearer, seized the colors and brought them back to his regiment." The flag that Josselyn took was from the 18th Alabama infantry, and was held by General Daniel Butterfield and then the US War Department before it was given to Alabama in 1905.

In this action against the 18th Alabama Infantry, Josselyn single-handedly captured the nine men of the regimental color guard, who were returned to the Union lines as prisoners.

After the war, Josselyn worked for the Illinois Central Railroad. He later moved to Omaha, Nebraska, where he worked as an accountant and paymaster for the Union Pacific Railroad and was the corporate secretary for the Omaha Fire Insurance Company. He subsequently started his own insurance brokerage, S. T. Josselyn & Company. Josselyn was a Mason and a member of the Grand Army of the Republic and Military Order of the Loyal Legion of the United States.

Josselyn later moved to Skagway, Alaska, where he was an auditor for the White Pass and Yukon Route, dividing his time between Skagway and Seattle, Washington, where his wife and daughter lived. He died in Skagway on April 4, 1905. Josselyn was buried at Forest Lawn Memorial Park in Omaha. The unincorporated community of Josselyn, Nebraska in Dawson County was named for him.

In 1869, Josselyn married to Henrietta E. "Ettie" Cutler (1849–1928). They were the parents of two daughters, Blanche and May.
