= Eddyville =

Eddyville may refer to:

- Eddyville, California
- Eddyville, Illinois
- Eddyville, Iowa
- Eddyville, Kentucky
- Eddyville, Nebraska
- Eddyville, Oregon
- Eddyville, New York in Ulster County
