= Scotts Bluff County, Nebraska =

County in Nebraska, United States

- County
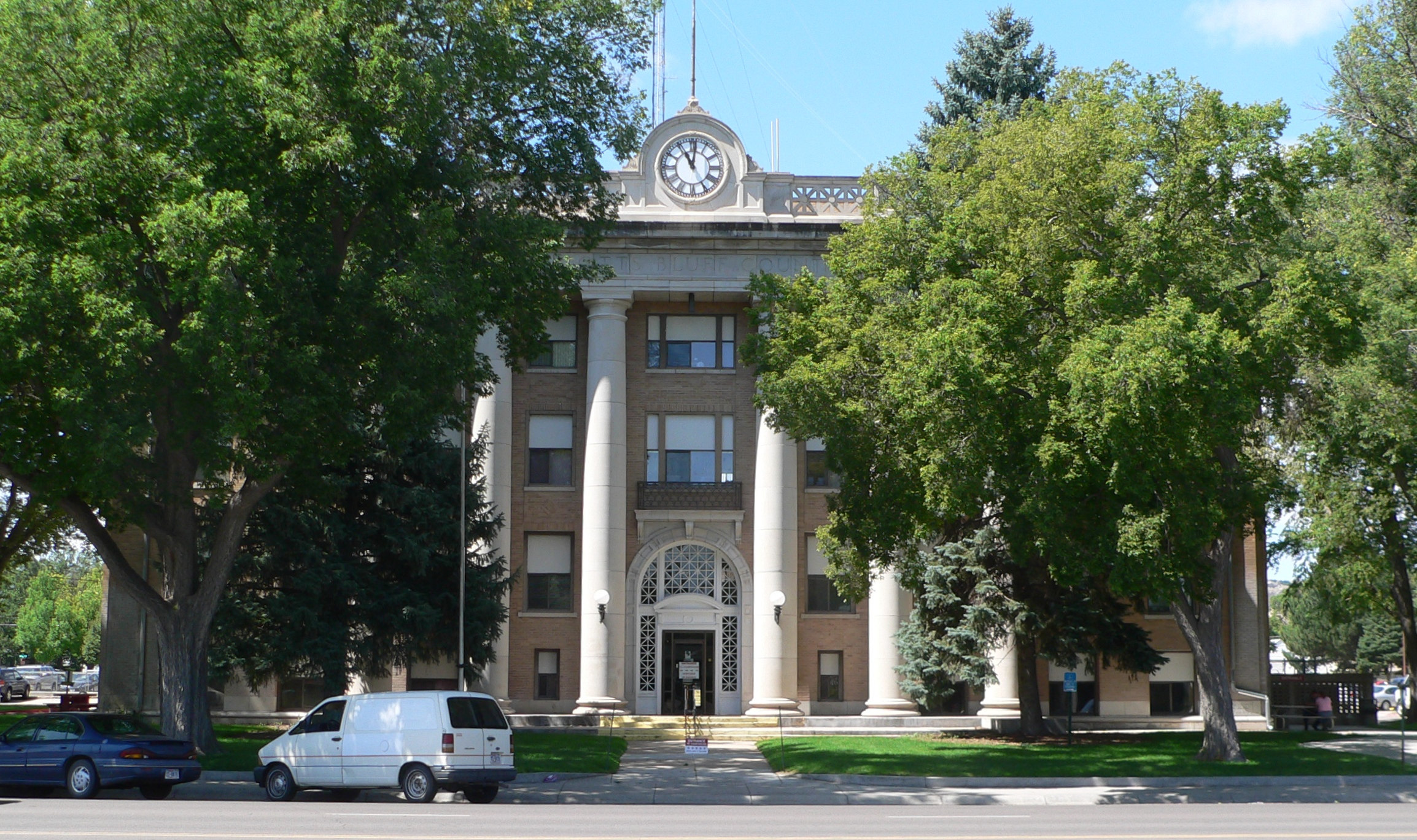
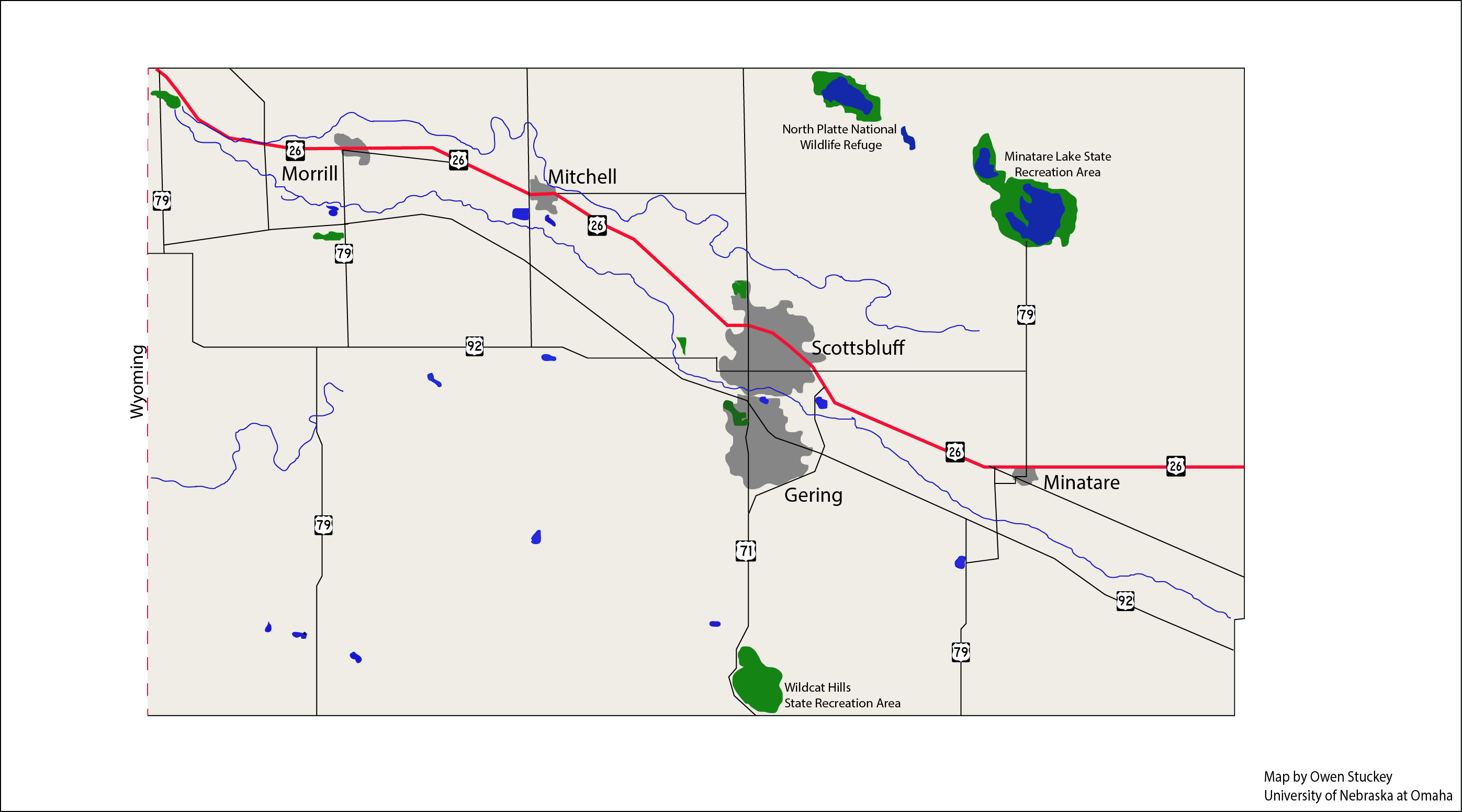
- The Scotts Bluff County Courthouse in Gering Road map of Scotts Bluff County

- Location within the U.S. state of Nebraska
- Coordinates: 41.8505°N 103.7030°W
- Country: United States
- State: Nebraska
- Founded: November 6, 1888
- Named for: Scotts Bluff
- Seat: Gering
- Largest city: Scottsbluff

Area
  - Total: 745.555 sq mi (1,930.98 km^{2})
  - Land: 739.621 sq mi (1,915.61 km^{2})
  - Water: 5.934 sq mi (15.37 km^{2}) 0.80%

Population (2020)
  - Total: 36,084
  - Estimate (2025): 35,586 ▼
  - Density: 48.787/sq mi (18.837/km^{2})
- Time zone: UTC−7 (Mountain)
  - Summer (DST): UTC−6 (MDT)
- Area code: 308
- Congressional district: 3rd
- Website: scottsbluffcountyne.gov
- • Nebraska county number 79 • Nebraska license plate prefix 21

Scotts Bluff County is a county on the western border of the U.S. state of Nebraska. As of the 2020 census, the population was 36,084, and was estimated to be 35,586 in 2025, making it the ninth-most populous county in Nebraska. The county seat is Gering and the largest city is Scottsbluff.

Scotts Bluff County is included in the Scottsbluff, NE micropolitan area.

In the Nebraska license plate system, Scotts Bluff County was represented by the prefix "21" (as it had the 21st-largest number of vehicles registered in the state when the license plate system was established in 1922).

== History ==
Scotts Bluff County was created on November 6, 1888.

The county is named for a prominent bluff that served as a landmark for 19th-century pioneers traveling along the Oregon Trail. Scotts Bluff was named for Hiram Scott, a Rocky Mountain Fur Company trapper who died nearby around 1828. Washington Irving claimed that, after being injured and abandoned, Scott had crawled sixty miles only to perish near the bluff that now bears his name. The bluff is now managed by the National Park Service as Scotts Bluff National Monument.

The town of Gering was founded at the base of the bluff in 1887, and the city of Scottsbluff was founded across the North Platte River in 1900. Joined by the river, the former transportation highway, the two cities now form Nebraska's 7th-largest urban area.

On July 31, 2022, a VOW (Volcano Warning) was issued for the Scottsbluff area. The alert itself did not say anything about a volcano, but rather a wildfire. Nebraska has no active and/or dormant volcanoes.

== Transportation ==
Scotts Bluff County Airport (BFF) is Nebraska's third busiest airport in terms of passenger boardings.

== Geography ==
According to the United States Census Bureau, the county has a total area of 745.555 square miles (1,930.98 km^{2}), of which 739.621 square miles (1,915.61 km^{2}) is land and 5.934 square miles (15.37 km^{2}) (0.80%) is water. It is the 32nd-largest county in Nebraska by total area.

Scotts Bluff County is on the west side of Nebraska. Its west boundary line abuts the east boundary line of the state of Wyoming. The North Platte River flows east-southeastward through the upper central part of the county. The county's terrain consists of arid rolling hills, about half of which is dedicated to agriculture. The county's lands slope to the east-southeast.

=== Major highways ===
- U.S. Highway 26
- Nebraska Highway 29
- Nebraska Highway 71
- Nebraska Highway 92

=== Adjacent counties ===
- Sioux County – north
- Box Butte County – northeast
- Morrill County – east
- Banner County – south
- Goshen County, Wyoming – west

=== Protected areas ===
- Kiowa State Wildlife Management Area
- Lake Minatare State Recreation Area
- North Platte National Wildlife Refuge
- Scotts Bluff National Monument
- Wildcat Hills State Recreation Area

== Demographics ==
Historical population
Census	Pop.	Note	%±
1890	1,888		—
1900	2,552		35.2%
1910	8,355		227.4%
1920	20,710		147.9%
1930	28,644		38.3%
1940	33,917		18.4%
1950	33,939		0.1%
1960	33,809		−0.4%
1970	36,432		7.8%
1980	38,344		5.2%
1990	36,025		−6.0%
2000	36,951		2.6%
2010	36,970		0.1%
2020	36,084		−2.4%
2025 (est.)	35,586	▼	−1.4%
U.S. Decennial Census; 1790–1960 1900–1990; 1990–2000 2010–2020

As of the third quarter of 2025, the median home value in Scotts Bluff County was $180,066.

As of the 2024 American Community Survey, there are 15,078 estimated households in Scotts Bluff County with an average of 2.32 persons per household. The county has a median household income of $63,614. Approximately 12.9% of the county's population lives at or below the poverty line. Scotts Bluff County has an estimated 62.1% employment rate, with 27.0% of the population holding a bachelor's degree or higher and 90.8% holding a high school diploma. There were 16,480 housing units at an average density of 22.10 per square mile (8.5/km^{2}).

The top five reported languages (people were allowed to report up to two languages, thus the figures will generally add to more than 100%) were English (89.1%), Spanish (9.3%), Indo-European (0.6%), Asian and Pacific Islander (0.8%), and Other (0.1%).

The median age in the county was 40.3 years.

Scotts Bluff County, Nebraska – racial and ethnic composition Note: the US Census treats Hispanic/Latino as an ethnic category. This table excludes Latinos from the racial categories and assigns them to a separate category. Hispanics/Latinos may be of any race.
Race / ethnicity (NH = non-Hispanic)	Pop. 1980	Pop. 1990	Pop. 2000	Pop. 2010	Pop. 2020
White alone (NH)	32,908 (85.82%)	29,938 (83.10%)	29,457 (79.72%)	27,931 (75.55%)	25,711 (71.25%)
Black or African American alone (NH)	60 (0.16%)	51 (0.14%)	87 (0.24%)	157 (0.42%)	234 (0.65%)
Native American or Alaska Native alone (NH)	455 (1.19%)	579 (1.61%)	557 (1.51%)	533 (1.44%)	466 (1.29%)
Asian alone (NH)	193 (0.50%)	173 (0.48%)	211 (0.57%)	207 (0.56%)	277 (0.77%)
Pacific Islander alone (NH)	—	—	12 (0.03%)	15 (0.04%)	25 (0.07%)
Other race alone (NH)	14 (0.04%)	47 (0.13%)	17 (0.05%)	30 (0.08%)	100 (0.28%)
Mixed race or multiracial (NH)	—	—	258 (0.70%)	312 (0.84%)	1,068 (2.96%)
Hispanic or Latino (any race)	4,714 (12.29%)	5,237 (14.54%)	6,352 (17.19%)	7,785 (21.06%)	8,203 (22.73%)
Total	38,344 (100.00%)	36,025 (100.00%)	36,951 (100.00%)	36,970 (100.00%)	36,084 (100.00%)

=== 2024 estimate ===
As of the 2024 estimate, there were 35,734 people, 15,078 households, and _ families residing in the county. The population density was 47.93 inhabitants per square mile (18.5/km^{2}). There were 16,480 housing units at an average density of 22.10 per square mile (8.5/km^{2}). The racial makeup of the county was 91.4% White (70.9% NH White), 1.2% African American, 4.5% Native American, 1.1% Asian, 0.1% Pacific Islander, _% from some other races and 1.7% from two or more races. Hispanic or Latino people of any race were 24.8% of the population.

=== 2020 census ===
As of the 2020 census, there were 36,084 people, 14,689 households, and 9,378 families residing in the county. The population density was 48.40 inhabitants per square mile (18.7/km^{2}). There were 16,494 housing units at an average density of 22.12 per square mile (8.5/km^{2}). The racial makeup of the county was 78.33% White, 0.80% African American, 2.13% Native American, 0.78% Asian, 0.07% Pacific Islander, 7.38% from some other races and 10.51% from two or more races. Hispanic or Latino people of any race were 22.73% of the population.

The median age was 40.3 years. 24.2% of residents were under the age of 18 and 20.5% of residents were 65 years of age or older. For every 100 females there were 95.1 males, and for every 100 females age 18 and over there were 92.0 males age 18 and over.

69.6% of residents lived in urban areas, while 30.4% lived in rural areas.

There were 14,689 households in the county, of which 29.7% had children under the age of 18 living with them and 28.1% had a female householder with no spouse or partner present. About 31.2% of all households were made up of individuals and 14.6% had someone living alone who was 65 years of age or older.

There were 16,494 housing units, of which 10.9% were vacant. Among occupied housing units, 67.4% were owner-occupied and 32.6% were renter-occupied. The homeowner vacancy rate was 1.8% and the rental vacancy rate was 14.3%.

=== 2010 census ===
As of the 2010 census, there were 36,970 people, 14,928 households, and 9,982 families residing in the county. The population density was 49.59 inhabitants per square mile (19.1/km^{2}). There were 16,408 housing units at an average density of 22.01 per square mile (8.5/km^{2}). The racial makeup of the county was 87.39% White, 0.55% African American, 2.12% Native American, 0.59% Asian, 0.05% Pacific Islander, 7.35% from some other races and 1.95% from two or more races. Hispanic or Latino people of any race were 21.06% of the population.

=== 2000 census ===
As of the 2000 census, there were 36,951 people, 14,887 households, and 10,167 families residing in the county. The population density was 49.56 inhabitants per square mile (19.1/km^{2}). There were 16,119 housing units at an average density of 21.62 per square mile (8.3/km^{2}). The racial makeup of the county was 87.58% White, 0.27% African American, 1.88% Native American, 0.57% Asian, 0.04% Pacific Islander, 8.02% from some other races and 1.63% from two or more races. Hispanic or Latino people of any race were 17.19% of the population. 39.5% were of German, 8.6% English and 6.8% Irish ancestry.

There were 14,887 households, out of which 31.50% had children under the age of 18 living with them, 54.20% were married couples living together, 10.70% had a female householder with no husband present, and 31.70% were non-families. 27.80% of all households were made up of individuals, and 12.80% had someone living alone who was 65 years of age or older. The average household size was 2.44 and the average family size was 2.97.

The county population contained 25.90% under the age of 18, 8.40% from 18 to 24, 25.40% from 25 to 44, 23.00% from 45 to 64, and 17.20% who were 65 years of age or older. The median age was 38 years. For every 100 females there were 91.20 males. For every 100 females age 18 and over, there were 88.30 males.

The median income for a household in the county was $32,016, and the median income for a family was $38,932. Males had a median income of $30,317 versus $20,717 for females. The per capita income for the county was $17,355. About 11.00% of families and 14.50% of the population were below the poverty line, including 22.00% of those under age 18 and 8.70% of those age 65 or over.

== Economy ==
The economy of Scotts Bluff County is based on agriculture, with the primary crops being sugar beets, corn, and beans.

== Communities ==
=== Cities ===
- Gering (county seat)
- Minatare
- Mitchell
- Terrytown
- Scottsbluff

=== Villages ===
- Henry
- Lyman
- McGrew
- Melbeta
- Morrill

=== Unincorporated communities ===
- Bradley
- Haig

=== Precincts ===
- Castle Rock
- Dewey Tabor
- East Winters Creek
- Fanning
- Ford
- Funston
- Gering
- Highland
- Kiowa
- Mitchell
- Roubadeau
- West Winters Creek

== Politics ==
Scotts Bluff County voters have been reliably Republican for almost a century. Even Lyndon Johnson failed to win the county in his 1964 landslide, while Franklin Roosevelt only managed to win the county in his first two campaigns. As of 2024, the county has not voted for a Democratic presidential candidate since 1936. The county also is slightly conservative in gubernatiorial elections; Democrats have won the county, but never without winning the state as a whole. Some Democrats have even won governorship without winning the county, such as J. James Exon and Ben Nelson.

However, Scottsbluff has been the only precinct in the Nebraska panhandle to vote Democratic at the federal level since the 1990s.

Political Party	Number of registered voters (April 1, 2026)	Percent
Republican	12,929	57.50%
Independent	4,868	21.65%
Democratic	4,206	18.71%
Libertarian	306	1.36%
Legal Marijuana Now	175	0.78%
Total	22,484	100.00%

United States presidential election results for Scotts Bluff County, Nebraska
Year	Republican		Democratic		Third party(ies)	
Year	No.	%	No.	%	No.	%
1900	400	56.66%	276	39.09%	30	4.25%
1904	530	67.86%	103	13.19%	148	18.95%
1908	789	54.75%	549	38.10%	103	7.15%
1912	314	18.18%	495	28.66%	918	53.16%
1916	1,144	38.98%	1,587	54.07%	204	6.95%
1920	3,189	71.52%	969	21.73%	301	6.75%
1924	3,410	62.29%	1,132	20.68%	932	17.03%
1928	6,677	81.76%	1,403	17.18%	87	1.07%
1932	4,108	45.59%	4,792	53.18%	111	1.23%
1936	4,051	40.53%	5,768	57.70%	177	1.77%
1940	7,989	64.20%	4,455	35.80%	0	0.00%
1944	6,947	65.05%	3,733	34.95%	0	0.00%
1948	5,409	55.22%	4,386	44.78%	0	0.00%
1952	9,674	72.94%	3,589	27.06%	0	0.00%
1956	8,027	63.12%	4,690	36.88%	0	0.00%
1960	8,728	60.72%	5,646	39.28%	0	0.00%
1964	6,965	52.24%	6,368	47.76%	0	0.00%
1968	7,356	67.17%	2,649	24.19%	946	8.64%
1972	8,649	75.78%	2,764	24.22%	0	0.00%
1976	6,887	60.05%	4,298	37.48%	283	2.47%
1980	9,504	71.73%	2,854	21.54%	891	6.73%
1984	10,711	77.18%	3,074	22.15%	93	0.67%
1988	8,613	65.39%	4,464	33.89%	94	0.71%
1992	7,213	48.24%	4,175	27.92%	3,563	23.83%
1996	7,641	56.43%	4,547	33.58%	1,353	9.99%
2000	9,397	67.90%	3,937	28.45%	505	3.65%
2004	10,378	72.12%	3,843	26.71%	169	1.17%
2008	9,708	65.91%	4,745	32.21%	277	1.88%
2012	9,648	67.53%	4,327	30.29%	312	2.18%
2016	10,076	70.38%	3,207	22.40%	1,034	7.22%
2020	10,952	70.55%	4,196	27.03%	376	2.42%
2024	11,033	73.09%	3,856	25.54%	206	1.36%

== Education ==
School districts include:

- Banner County Public Schools #1, Harrisburg
- Bayard Public Schools #21, Bayard
- Gering Public Schools #16, Gering
- Minatare Public Schools #2, Minatare
- Mitchell Public Schools #31, Mitchell
- Morrill Public Schools #11, Morrill
- Scottsbluff Public Schools #32, Scottsbluff

== See also ==
- Lake Minatare Lighthouse
- National Register of Historic Places listings in Scotts Bluff County, Nebraska
