= Melbeta, Nebraska =

Village in Scotts Bluff County, Nebraska, United States

- Village
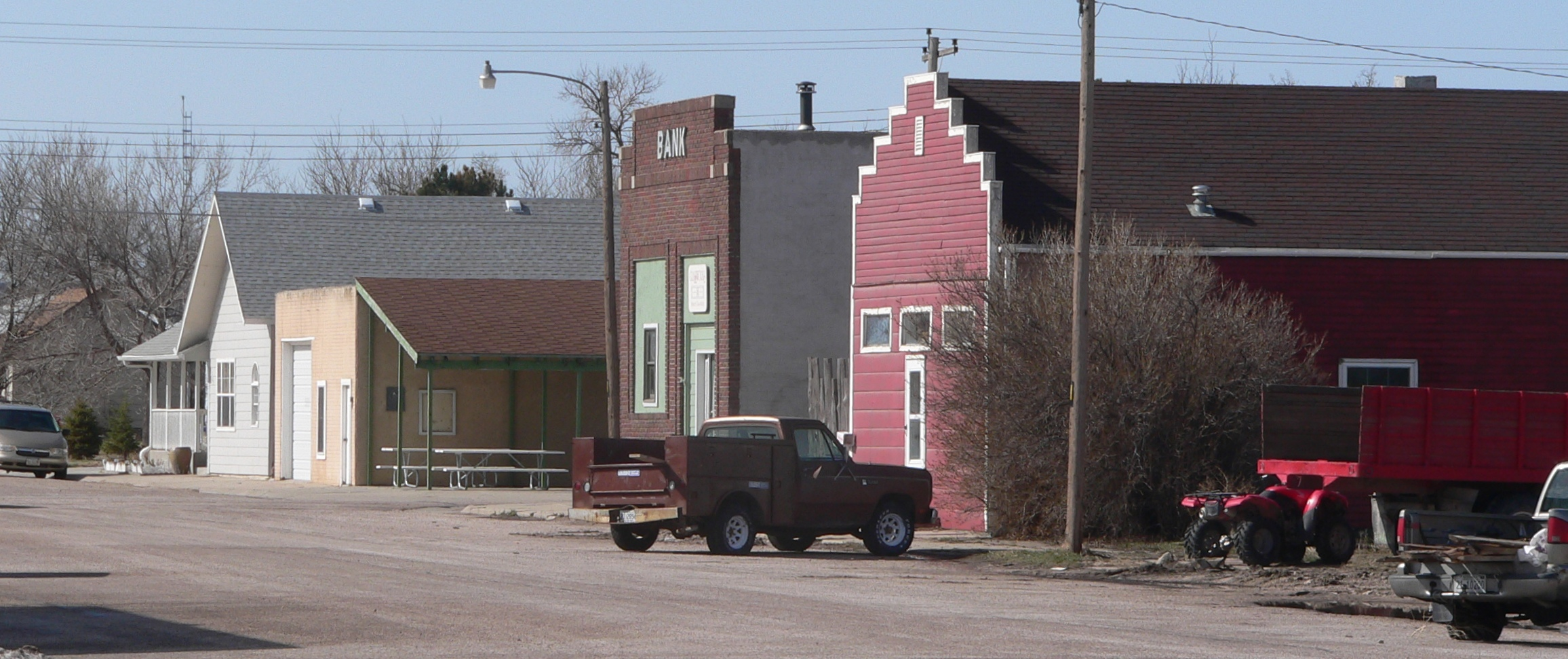
- West side of Main Street, Melbeta, April 2013

- Location of Melbeta, Nebraska
- Coordinates: 41°46′55″N 103°31′01″W
- Country: United States
- State: Nebraska
- County: Scotts Bluff

Area
  - Total: 0.097 sq mi (0.25 km^{2})
  - Land: 0.097 sq mi (0.25 km^{2})
  - Water: 0 sq mi (0.00 km^{2})
- Elevation: 3,829 ft (1,167 m)

Population (2020)
  - Total: 108
  - Density: 1,124.6/sq mi (434.21/km^{2})
- Time zone: UTC-7 (Mountain (MST))
  - Summer (DST): UTC-6 (MDT)
- ZIP code: 69355
- Area code: 308
- FIPS code: 31-31570
- GNIS feature ID: 2399306

Melbeta is a village in Scotts Bluff County, Nebraska, United States. It is part of the Scottsbluff, Nebraska Micropolitan Statistical Area. As of the 2020 census, Melbeta had a population of 108.

== History ==
Melbeta was established as a town in 1911 when the railroad was extended to that point. Melbeta is said to be derived from a German word meaning "sugar beet".

== Geography ==
According to the United States Census Bureau, the village has a total area of 0.09 square miles (0.23 km^{2}), all land.

== Demographics ==
Historical population
Census	Pop.	Note	%±
1920	129		—
1930	138		7.0%
1940	145		5.1%
1950	138		−4.8%
1960	118		−14.5%
1970	124		5.1%
1980	151		21.8%
1990	116		−23.2%
2000	138		19.0%
2010	112		−18.8%
2020	108		−3.6%
U.S. Decennial Census

=== 2010 census ===
As of the census of 2010, there were 112 people, 46 households, and 30 families residing in the village. The population density was 1,244.4 inhabitants per square mile (480.5/km^{2}). There were 58 housing units at an average density of 644.4 per square mile (248.8/km^{2}). The racial makeup of the village was 98.2% White and 1.8% from two or more races. Hispanic or Latino of any race were 4.5% of the population.

There were 46 households, of which 39.1% had children under the age of 18 living with them, 50.0% were married couples living together, 10.9% had a female householder with no husband present, 4.3% had a male householder with no wife present, and 34.8% were non-families. 32.6% of all households were made up of individuals, and 21.7% had someone living alone who was 65 years of age or older. The average household size was 2.43 and the average family size was 3.10.

The median age in the village was 37 years. 31.2% of residents were under the age of 18; 5.5% were between the ages of 18 and 24; 22.4% were from 25 to 44; 25.1% were from 45 to 64; and 16.1% were 65 years of age or older. The gender makeup of the village was 51.8% male and 48.2% female.

=== 2000 census ===
As of the census of 2000, there were 138 people, 57 households, and 44 families residing in the village. The population density was 1,452.2 inhabitants per square mile (560.7/km^{2}). There were 65 housing units at an average density of 684.0 per square mile (264.1/km^{2}). The racial makeup of the village was 100.00% White. Hispanic or Latino of any race were 7.97% of the population.

There were 57 households, out of which 21.1% had children under the age of 18 living with them, 70.2% were married couples living together, 7.0% had a female householder with no husband present, and 21.1% were non-families. 17.5% of all households were made up of individuals, and 12.3% had someone living alone who was 65 years of age or older. The average household size was 2.42 and the average family size was 2.76.

In the village, the population was spread out, with 20.3% under the age of 18, 8.7% from 18 to 24, 22.5% from 25 to 44, 26.1% from 45 to 64, and 22.5% who were 65 years of age or older. The median age was 43 years. For every 100 females, there were 112.3 males. For every 100 females age 18 and over, there were 103.7 males.

As of 2000 the median income for a household in the village was $33,750, and the median income for a family was $36,875. Males had a median income of $26,389 versus $20,000 for females. The per capita income for the village was $15,268. None of the population and none of the families were below the poverty line.

== See also ==
- List of municipalities in Nebraska
