= Smithfield, Nebraska =

Village in Gosper County, Nebraska, United States

- Village
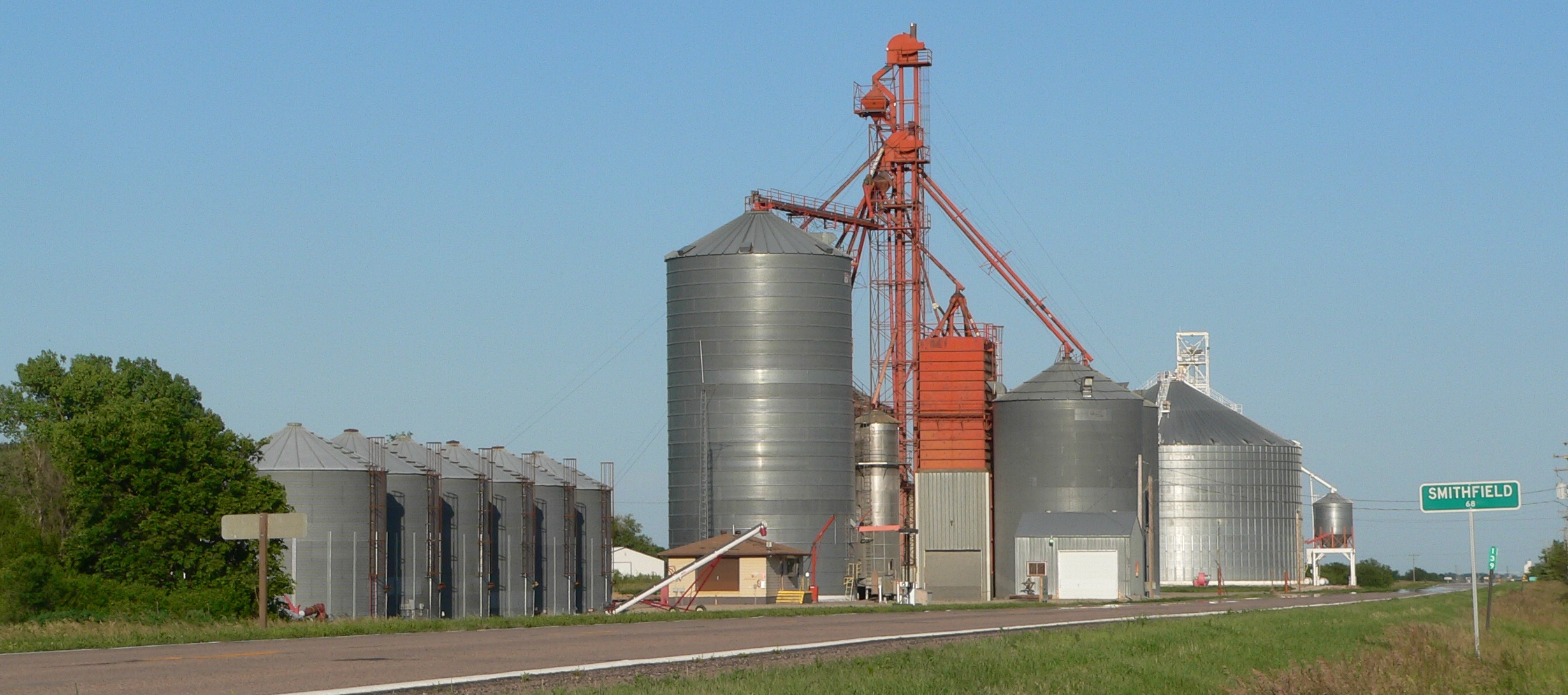
- Grain elevators in Smithfield

- Location of Smithfield, Nebraska
- Coordinates: 40°34′24″N 99°44′27″W
- Country: United States
- State: Nebraska
- County: Gosper

Area
  - Total: 0.17 sq mi (0.44 km^{2})
  - Land: 0.17 sq mi (0.44 km^{2})
  - Water: 0 sq mi (0.00 km^{2})
- Elevation: 2,546 ft (776 m)

Population (2020)
  - Total: 60
  - Density: 354.4/sq mi (136.82/km^{2})
- Time zone: UTC-6 (Central (CST))
  - Summer (DST): UTC-5 (CDT)
- ZIP code: 68976
- Area code: 308
- FIPS code: 31-45575
- GNIS feature ID: 2399832

Smithfield is a village in Gosper County, Nebraska, United States. It is part of the Lexington, Nebraska Micropolitan Statistical Area. As of the 2020 census, Smithfield had a population of 60.

== History ==
Smithfield was platted in 1890 in a field formerly owned by Elbert and Nancy Smith.

Smithfield was a shipping point on the Chicago, Burlington and Quincy Railroad.

== Geography ==
According to the United States Census Bureau, the village has a total area of 0.17 square miles (0.44 km^{2}), all land.

== Demographics ==
Historical population
Census	Pop.	Note	%±
1910	190		—
1920	229		20.5%
1930	165		−27.9%
1940	158		−4.2%
1950	102		−35.4%
1960	85		−16.7%
1970	58		−31.8%
1980	68		17.2%
1990	53		−22.1%
2000	68		28.3%
2010	54		−20.6%
2020	60		11.1%
U.S. Decennial Census

=== 2010 census ===
As of the census of 2010, there were 54 people, 25 households, and 16 families residing in the village. The population density was 317.6 inhabitants per square mile (122.6/km^{2}). There were 34 housing units at an average density of 200.0 per square mile (77.2/km^{2}). The racial makeup of the village was 94.4% White, 1.9% Asian, and 3.7% from two or more races.

There were 25 households, of which 20.0% had children under the age of 18 living with them, 52.0% were married couples living together, 8.0% had a female householder with no husband present, 4.0% had a male householder with no wife present, and 36.0% were non-families. 28.0% of all households were made up of individuals, and 16% had someone living alone who was 65 years of age or older. The average household size was 2.16 and the average family size was 2.69.

The median age in the village was 51.5 years. 20.4% of residents were under the age of 18; 3.7% were between the ages of 18 and 24; 22.3% were from 25 to 44; 33.4% were from 45 to 64; and 20.4% were 65 years of age or older. The gender makeup of the village was 59.3% male and 40.7% female.

=== 2000 census ===
As of the census of 2000, there were 68 people, 27 households, and 20 families residing in the village. The population density was 412.3 inhabitants per square mile (159.2/km^{2}). There were 33 housing units at an average density of 200.1 per square mile (77.3/km^{2}). The racial makeup of the village was 100.00% White.

There were 27 households, out of which 29.6% had children under the age of 18 living with them, 66.7% were married couples living together, 7.4% had a female householder with no husband present, and 25.9% were non-families. 22.2% of all households were made up of individuals, and 11.1% had someone living alone who was 65 years of age or older. The average household size was 2.52 and the average family size was 2.90.

In the village, the population was spread out, with 22.1% under the age of 18, 7.4% from 18 to 24, 25.0% from 25 to 44, 33.8% from 45 to 64, and 11.8% who were 65 years of age or older. The median age was 44 years. For every 100 females, there were 106.1 males. For every 100 females age 18 and over, there were 96.3 males.

As of 2000 the median income for a household in the village was $40,625, and the median income for a family was $42,188. Males had a median income of $26,250 versus $18,125 for females. The per capita income for the village was $15,988. There were 8.0% of families and 5.9% of the population living below the poverty line, including no under eighteens and none of those over 64.

== See also ==
- List of municipalities in Nebraska
