= Haig, Nebraska =

Unincorporated community in Nebraska, U.S.

Coordinates: 41°52′46″N 103°45′33″W

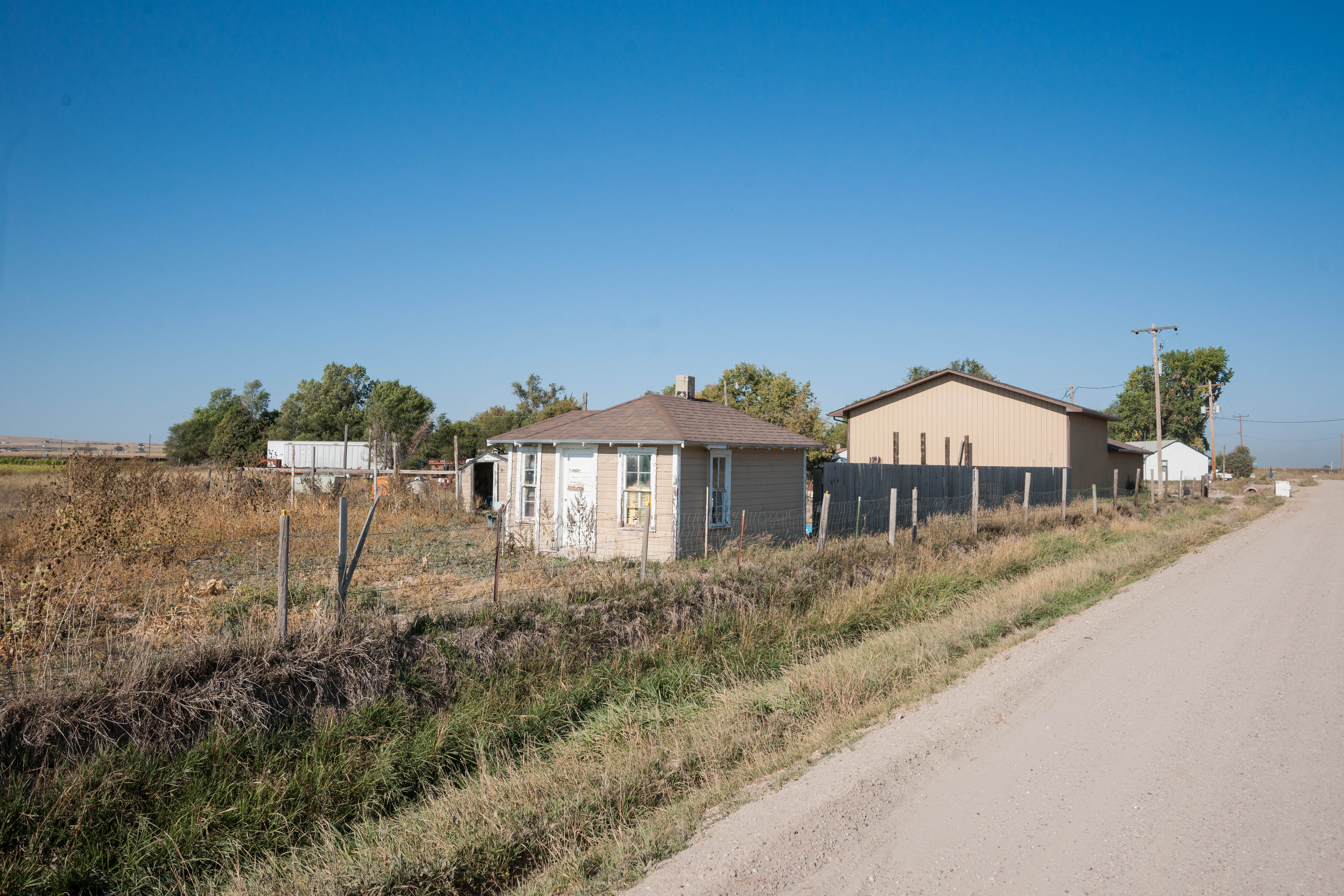
Buildings in Haig, September 2012

Haig is an unincorporated community in Scotts Bluff County, Nebraska, United States.

== History ==
Haig (also historically called Haigville) got its start when the Union Pacific Railroad was extended to that point. It was named for Harry Haig, described in one source as a local "cowboy".

A post office was established in Haig (Haigville) in 1914, and remained in operation until being discontinued in 1963.
