= Henry, Nebraska =

Village in Nebraska, United States

- Village
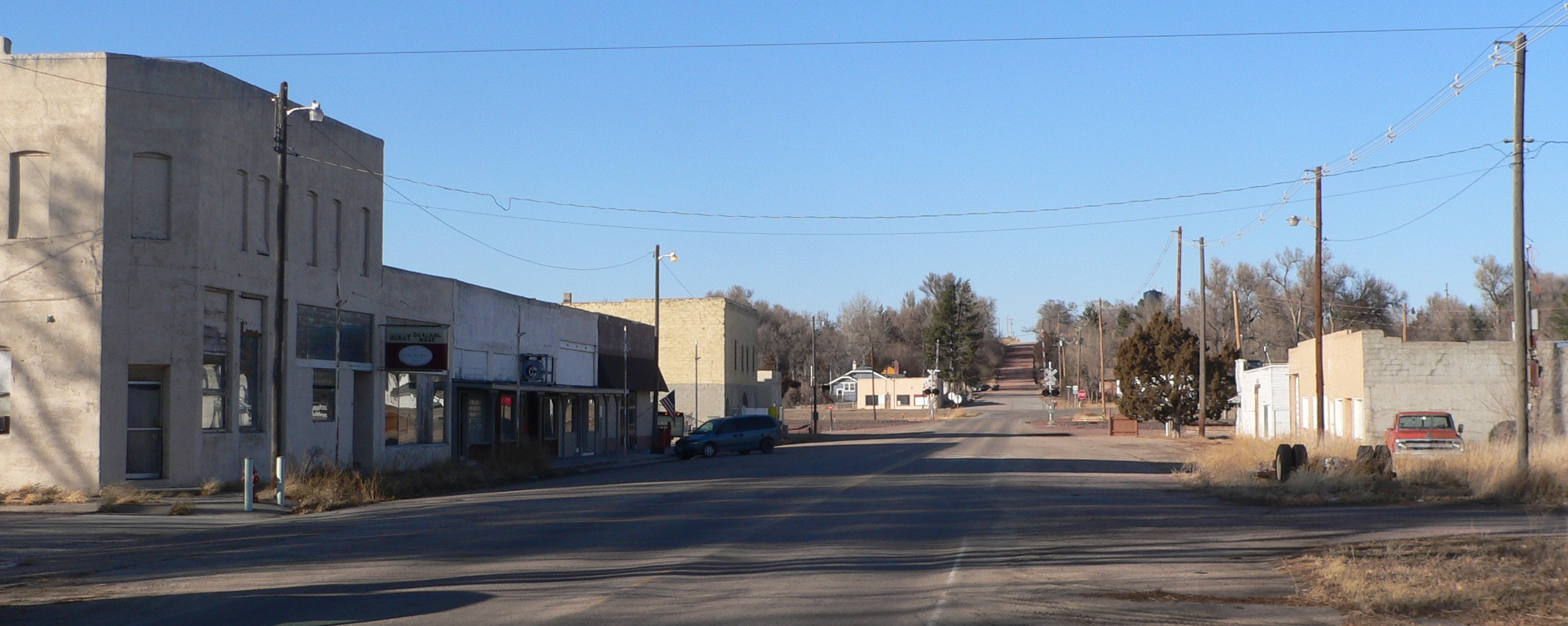
- Downtown Henry, north along Nichols Avenue (formerly Nebraska Link 79C), February 2012

- Location of Henry, Nebraska
- Coordinates: 41°59′52″N 104°02′45″W
- Country: United States
- State: Nebraska
- County: Scotts Bluff

Area
  - Total: 0.31 sq mi (0.80 km^{2})
  - Land: 0.31 sq mi (0.80 km^{2})
  - Water: 0 sq mi (0.00 km^{2})
- Elevation: 4,036 ft (1,230 m)

Population (2020)
  - Total: 125
  - Density: 407.1/sq mi (157.18/km^{2})
- Time zone: UTC-7 (Mountain (MST))
  - Summer (DST): UTC-6 (MDT)
- ZIP codes: 69349, 69358
- Area code: 308
- FIPS code: 31-22150
- GNIS feature ID: 2398491

Henry is a village in Scotts Bluff County, Nebraska, United States. It is part of the Scottsbluff, Nebraska Micropolitan Statistical Area. Henry is the westernmost municipality in both the state of Nebraska and the entire Midwest region of the United States. As of the 2020 census, Henry had a population of 125.

== History ==
Henry was founded in 1909 when the railroad was extended to that point. It was named for Henry Nichols, the late son of the original owner of the town site.

== Geography ==
The town's western boundary borders Wyoming's eastern state boundary.

According to the United States Census Bureau, the village has a total area of 0.29 square miles (0.75 km^{2}), all land.

== Demographics ==
Historical population
Census	Pop.	Note	%±
1920	129		—
1930	167		29.5%
1940	176		5.4%
1950	171		−2.8%
1960	138		−19.3%
1970	147		6.5%
1980	155		5.4%
1990	145		−6.5%
2000	162		11.7%
2010	106		−34.6%
2020	125		17.9%
U.S. Decennial Census

=== 2010 census ===
As of the census of 2010, there were 106 people, 46 households, and 26 families residing in the village. The population density was 365.5 inhabitants per square mile (141.1/km^{2}). There were 52 housing units at an average density of 179.3 per square mile (69.2/km^{2}). The racial makeup of the village was 90.6% White, 1.9% African American, 1.9% Native American, 1.9% Asian, 2.8% from other races, and 0.9% from two or more races. Hispanic or Latino of any race were 6.6% of the population.

There were 46 households, of which 26.1% had children under the age of 18 living with them, 43.5% were married couples living together, 10.9% had a female householder with no husband present, 2.2% had a male householder with no wife present, and 43.5% were non-families. 37.0% of all households were made up of individuals, and 8.7% had someone living alone who was 65 years of age or older. The average household size was 2.30 and the average family size was 2.96.

The median age in the village was 42 years. 23.6% of residents were under the age of 18; 4.7% were between the ages of 18 and 24; 29.1% were from 25 to 44; 31.1% were from 45 to 64; and 11.3% were 65 years of age or older. The gender makeup of the village was 53.8% male and 46.2% female.

=== 2000 census ===
As of the census of 2000, there were 162 people, 56 households, and 42 families residing in the village. The population density was 547.9 inhabitants per square mile (211.5/km^{2}). There were 59 housing units at an average density of 199.5 per square mile (77.0/km^{2}). The racial makeup of the village was 98.15% White, 0.62% African American, 0.62% Pacific Islander, 0.62% from other races. Hispanic or Latino of any race were 4.32% of the population.

There were 56 households, out of which 35.7% had children under the age of 18 living with them, 57.1% were married couples living together, 12.5% had a female householder with no husband present, and 25.0% were non-families. 19.6% of all households were made up of individuals, and 12.5% had someone living alone who was 65 years of age or older. The average household size was 2.89 and the average family size was 3.24.

In the village, the population was spread out, with 28.4% under the age of 18, 9.3% from 18 to 24, 25.3% from 25 to 44, 23.5% from 45 to 64, and 13.6% who were 65 years of age or older. The median age was 35 years. For every 100 females, there were 92.9 males. For every 100 females age 18 and over, there were 81.3 males.

As of 2000 the median income for a household in the village was $36,250, and the median income for a family was $43,750. Males had a median income of $27,500 versus $24,375 for females. The per capita income for the village was $17,348. None of the families and 6.3% of the population were living below the poverty line, including no under eighteens and 33.3% of those over 64.

== Highways ==
- US 26 U.S. Route 26 - southeast-northwest route through Henry.
- Holloway Road (formerly Nebraska Link 79C) - route leading south out of henry to Lyman.

== See also ==
- List of municipalities in Nebraska
