= Lyman, Nebraska =

Village in Scotts Bluff County, Nebraska, United States

- Village
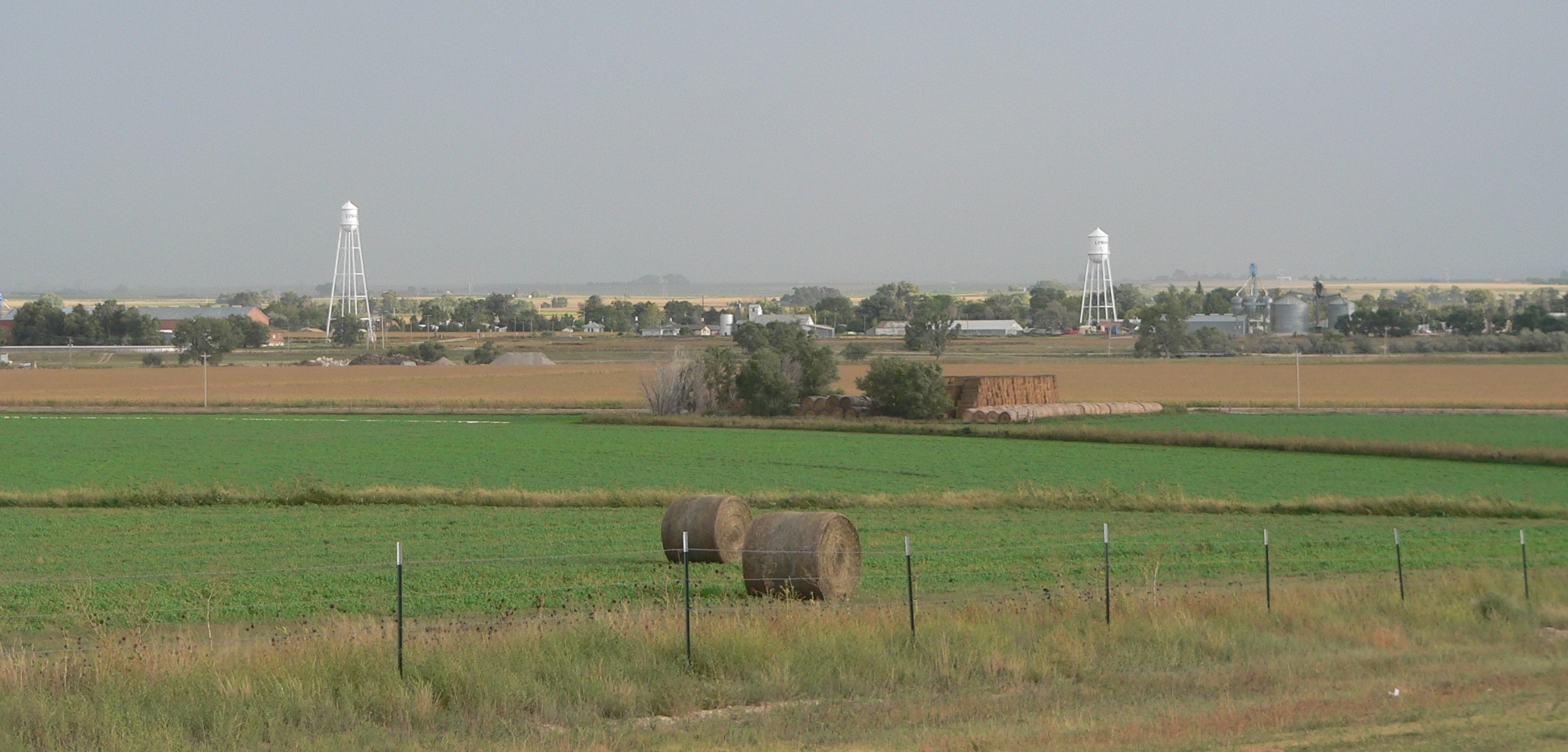
- Lyman, seen from the former Nebraska Link 79C to the northwest, September 2013

- Location of Lyman, Nebraska
- Coordinates: 41°55′01″N 104°02′17″W
- Country: United States
- State: Nebraska
- County: Scotts Bluff

Area
  - Total: 0.31 sq mi (0.80 km^{2})
  - Land: 0.31 sq mi (0.80 km^{2})
  - Water: 0 sq mi (0.00 km^{2})
- Elevation: 4,049 ft (1,234 m)

Population (2020)
  - Total: 259
  - Density: 834.3/sq mi (322.13/km^{2})
- Time zone: UTC-7 (Mountain (MST))
  - Summer (DST): UTC-6 (MDT)
- ZIP code: 69352
- Area code: 308
- FIPS code: 31-29715
- GNIS feature ID: 2399205

Lyman is a village in Scotts Bluff County, Nebraska, United States. It is part of the Scottsbluff, Nebraska Micropolitan Statistical Area. As of the 2020 census, Lyman had a population of 259.

== History ==
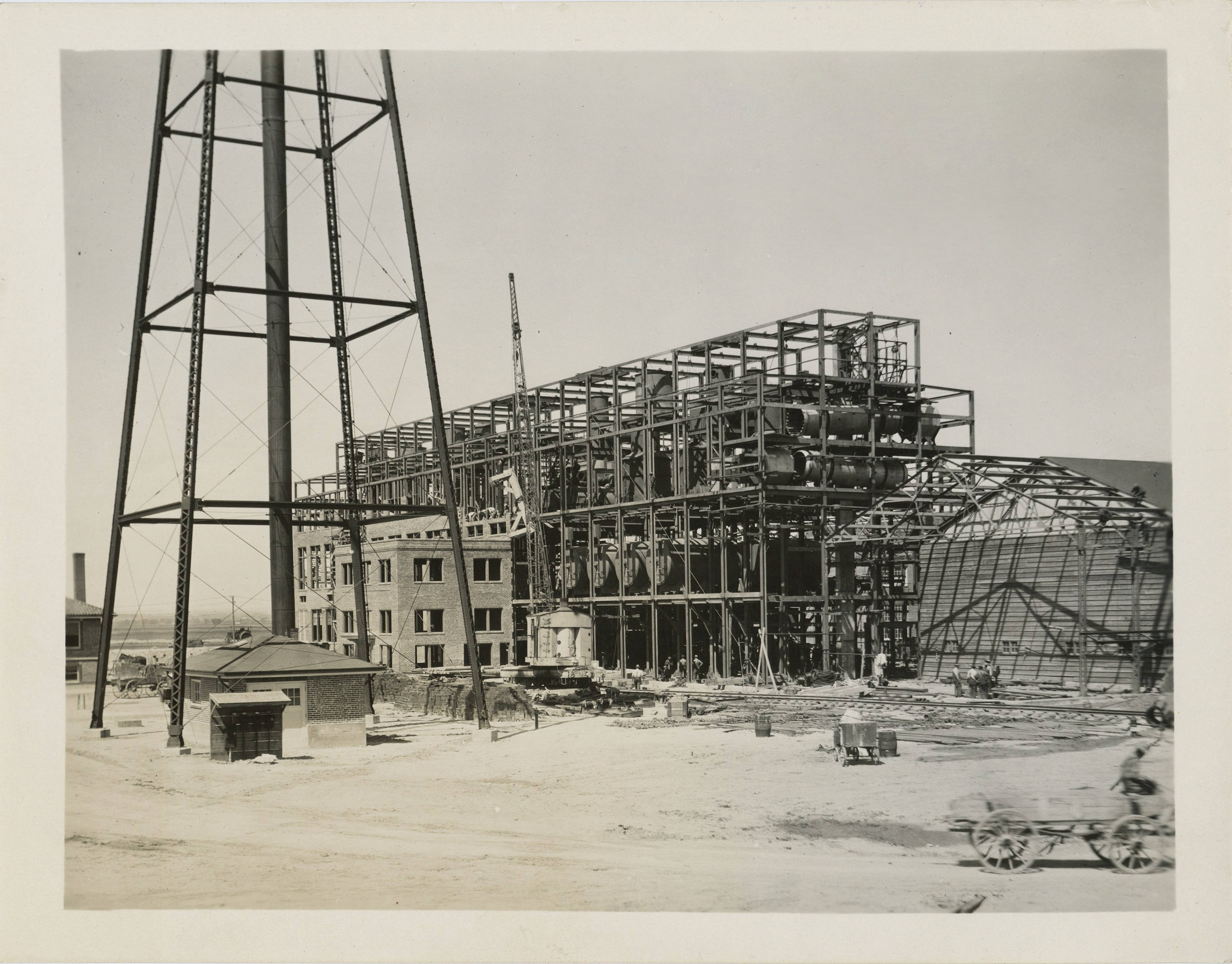
A factory under construction in 1927.

Lyman, less than a mile from the Wyoming border, is sited south of Horse Creek, a tributary of the North Platte River in western Nebraska. Due to its semi-arid climate, the area did not develop as early as other areas in the state with more moisture.

Lyman was incorporated as a village in 1922, when the Union Pacific Railroad was extended to that point.

The village was named for bankers Charles and W. H. Lyman.

== Geography ==
According to the United States Census Bureau, the village has a total area of 0.40 square miles (1.04 km^{2}), all land.

== Demographics ==
Historical population
Census	Pop.	Note	%±
1930	656		—
1940	672		2.4%
1950	666		−0.9%
1960	626		−6.0%
1970	561		−10.4%
1980	551		−1.8%
1990	452		−18.0%
2000	421		−6.9%
2010	341		−19.0%
2020	259		−24.0%
U.S. Decennial Census

=== 2010 census ===
As of the census of 2010, there were 341 people, 137 households, and 90 families residing in the village. The population density was 852.5 inhabitants per square mile (329.2/km^{2}). There were 165 housing units at an average density of 412.5 per square mile (159.3/km^{2}). The racial makeup of the village was 78.0% White, 0.3% Asian, 21.4% from other races, and 0.3% from two or more races. Hispanic or Latino of any race were 41.3% of the population.

There were 137 households, of which 35.0% had children under the age of 18 living with them, 48.2% were married couples living together, 13.1% had a female householder with no husband present, 4.4% had a male householder with no wife present, and 34.3% were non-families. 29.9% of all households were made up of individuals, and 14.6% had someone living alone who was 65 years of age or older. The average household size was 2.49 and the average family size was 3.06.

The median age in the village was 38.5 years. 28.4% of residents were under the age of 18; 6.7% were between the ages of 18 and 24; 22.4% were from 25 to 44; 26.1% were from 45 to 64; and 16.4% were 65 years of age or older. The gender makeup of the village was 50.7% male and 49.3% female.

=== 2000 census ===
As of the census of 2000, there were 421 people, 162 households, and 106 families residing in the village. The population density was 1,083.3 inhabitants per square mile (418.3/km^{2}). There were 179 housing units at an average density of 460.6 per square mile (177.8/km^{2}). The racial makeup of the village was 76.96% White, 0.24% Native American, 1.43% Asian, 0.24% Pacific Islander, 19.95% from other races, and 1.19% from two or more races. Hispanic or Latino of any race were 34.44% of the population.

There were 162 households, out of which 31.5% had children under the age of 18 living with them, 51.2% were married couples living together, 8.6% had a female householder with no husband present, and 34.0% were non-families. 29.6% of all households were made up of individuals, and 15.4% had someone living alone who was 65 years of age or older. The average household size was 2.60 and the average family size was 3.23.

In the village, the population was spread out, with 29.9% under the age of 18, 6.7% from 18 to 24, 23.0% from 25 to 44, 22.3% from 45 to 64, and 18.1% who were 65 years of age or older. The median age was 36 years. For every 100 females, there were 82.3 males. For every 100 females age 18 and over, there were 89.1 males.

As of 2000 the median income for a household in the village was $23,571, and the median income for a family was $27,969. Males had a median income of $26,250 versus $14,107 for females. The per capita income for the village was $13,080. About 20.6% of families and 27.3% of the population were below the poverty line, including 44.5% of those under age 18 and 3.2% of those age 65 or over.

== Highways ==
- N-92 - east-west route through Lyman, running concurrent with N Street through the village.
- Holloway Road (formerly Nebraska Link 79C) - route leading north out of Lyman to Henry.

== See also ==
- List of municipalities in Nebraska
