= North Platte National Wildlife Refuge =

Western Nebraska wildlife refuge

- IUCN category IV (habitat/species management area)
- Location within Nebraska Location within the United States
- Location: Scotts Bluff County, Nebraska, USA
- Nearest city: Scottsbluff, NE
- Coordinates: 41°56′59″N 103°32′14″W
- Area: 5,047 acres (2,042 ha)
- Established: August 21, 1916
- Governing body: U.S. Fish and Wildlife Service
- Website: North Platte National Wildlife Refuge

North Platte National Wildlife Refuge is located in the U.S. state of Nebraska and includes 5,047 acres (20.42 km^{2}). Managed by the U.S. Fish and Wildlife Service, the refuge is broken into four separate sections that are superimposed on U.S. Bureau of Reclamation–managed lakes and reservoirs. Together with the Crescent Lake National Wildlife Refuge, the two refuges form the Crescent Lake National Wildlife Refuge Complex.

Within the refuge is the longest continuously used bald eagle nesting site in the state of Nebraska. Since 1994, an average of two eaglets per year have been produced from this one nest alone. During fall migrations, 200,000 ducks, Canada geese, herons, and other waterfowl are known to use the refuge when migrating south. Since 1975, over 200 species of birds have been reported, which makes this refuge one of the finest for bird watching in the U.S. Pronghorn, mule deer, and white-tailed deer, along with raccoon, coyote, beaver, swift fox, river otter, prairie dog, and bobcat are some of the 40 species of mammal known to inhabit the refuge. Sport fishing is popular, with largemouth bass, walleye, and yellow perch considered the best game species.

The main section of the refuge is located 8 miles (12.87 km) northwest of Scottsbluff, Nebraska, the principal city of the Scottsbluff Micropolitan Statistical Area. The refuge consists of multiple lakes, most notably Lake Minatare, part of the Lake Minatare State Recreation Area.

== See also ==
- Lake Minatare Lighthouse
