= Bradley, Nebraska =

Unincorporated community in Nebraska, United States

- Unincorporated Community
- Location within Nebraska Location within the United States
- Coordinates: 41.8°N 103.4°W
- Country: United States
- State: Nebraska
- County: Scotts Bluff

Bradley is an unincorporated community in Scotts Bluff County, Nebraska, in the United States.

== History ==
Bradley had its start by the building of the Chicago, Burlington and Quincy Railroad through that territory.
