= Josselyn, Nebraska =

Unincorporated community in Nebraska, United States

- Unincorporated Community
- Location within Nebraska Location within the United States
- Coordinates: 40.7°N 99.6°W
- Country: United States
- State: Nebraska
- County: Dawson

Josselyn is an unincorporated community in Dawson County, Nebraska, United States.

== History ==
A post office was established at Josselyn in 1898, but it was discontinued in 1900. Josselyn was named for Simeon T. Josselyn, a railroad official who had received the Medal of Honor during the American Civil War.
