= McGrew, Nebraska =

Village in Scotts Bluff County, Nebraska, United States

- Village
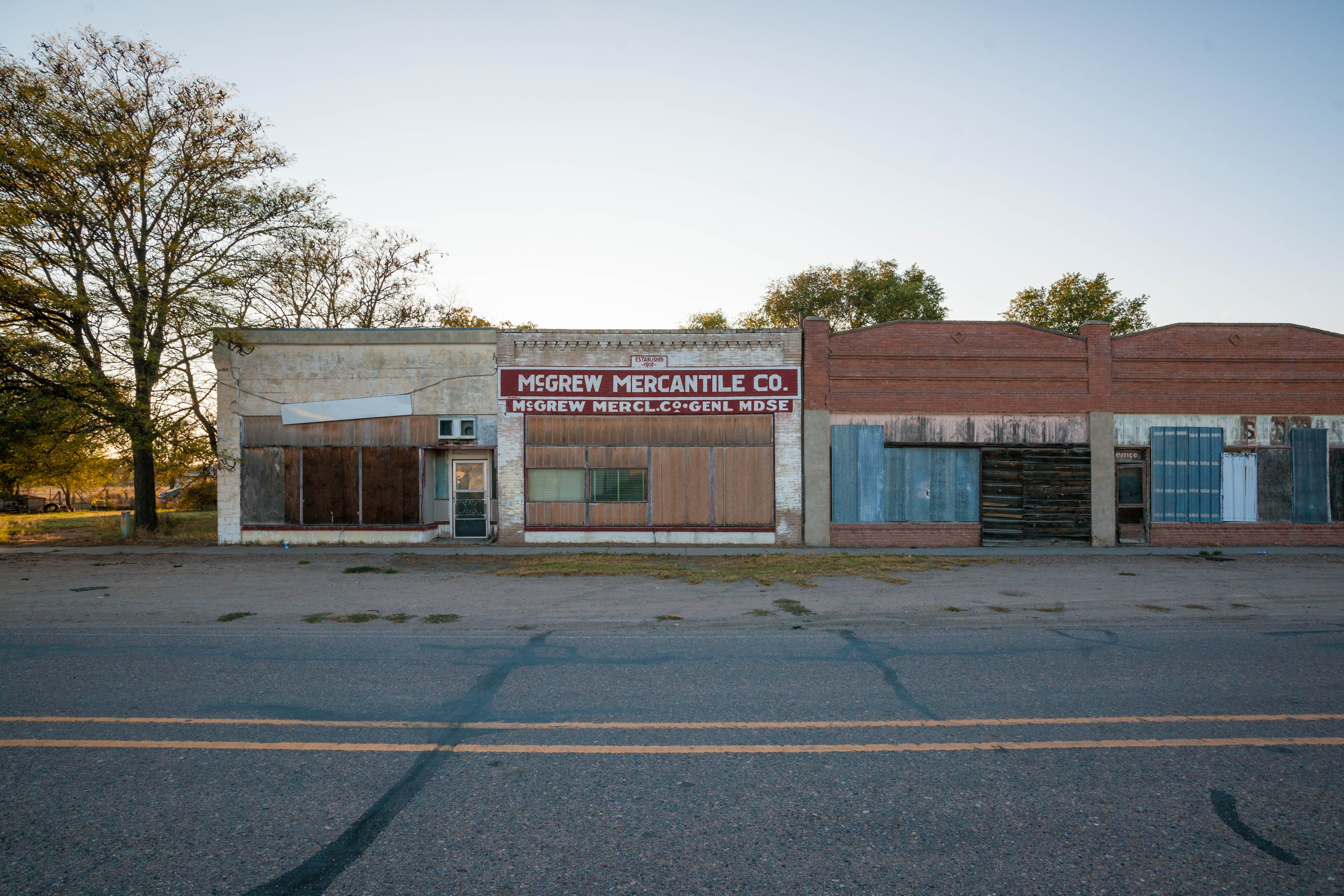
- McGrew Mercantile in McGrew, September 2012

- Location of McGrew, Nebraska
- Coordinates: 41°44′52″N 103°25′02″W
- Country: United States
- State: Nebraska
- County: Scotts Bluff
- Established: 1911

Area
  - Total: 0.14 sq mi (0.37 km^{2})
  - Land: 0.14 sq mi (0.37 km^{2})
  - Water: 0 sq mi (0.00 km^{2})
- Elevation: 3,783 ft (1,153 m)

Population (2020)
  - Total: 75
  - Density: 523.5/sq mi (202.11/km^{2})
- Time zone: UTC-7 (Mountain (MST))
  - Summer (DST): UTC-6 (MDT)
- ZIP code: 69353
- Area code: 308
- FIPS code: 31-30030
- GNIS feature ID: 2399294
- Website: villageofmcgrew.com

McGrew is a village in Scotts Bluff County, Nebraska, United States. It is part of the Scottsbluff, Nebraska Micropolitan Statistical Area. As of the 2020 census, McGrew had a population of 75.

== History ==
McGrew was incorporated as a village in 1911 when the Union Pacific Railroad was extended to that point. By 1912, it was home to a Presbyterian church, which ran services until 1971. McGrew boomed in the 1920s; at that time, businesses included several stores, a post office, a railway depot and grain elevator, a saloon, an industrial yard, agricultural buildings, and a hotel. The church was purchased by the Platte Valley Bible College and renamed the McGrew Community Church, and again renamed the Oregon Trail Chapel in 1986. A school was added in 1920. The post office shut down in 1986. Today, very few buildings are still in use and most are abandoned.

== Geography ==
According to the United States Census Bureau, the village has a total area of 0.36 square miles (0.93 km^{2}), all land.

== Demographics ==
Historical population
Census	Pop.	Note	%±
1920	128		—
1930	128		0.0%
1940	139		8.6%
1950	105		−24.5%
1960	90		−14.3%
1970	79		−12.2%
1980	110		39.2%
1990	99		−10.0%
2000	103		4.0%
2010	105		1.9%
2020	75		−28.6%
U.S. Decennial Census

=== 2010 census ===
As of the census of 2010, there were 105 people, 40 households, and 27 families residing in the village. The population density was 291.7 inhabitants per square mile (112.6/km^{2}). There were 44 housing units at an average density of 122.2 per square mile (47.2/km^{2}). The racial makeup of the village was 92.4% White, 1.0% African American, 3.8% Native American, 1.0% Pacific Islander, and 1.9% from other races. Hispanic or Latino of any race were 2.9% of the population.

There were 40 households, of which 35.0% had children under the age of 18 living with them, 52.5% were married couples living together, 7.5% had a female householder with no husband present, 7.5% had a male householder with no wife present, and 32.5% were non-families. 27.5% of all households were made up of individuals, and 10% had someone living alone who was 65 years of age or older. The average household size was 2.63 and the average family size was 3.26.

The median age in the village was 40.3 years. 28.6% of residents were under the age of 18; 5.7% were between the ages of 18 and 24; 20% were from 25 to 44; 31.4% were from 45 to 64; and 14.3% were 65 years of age or older. The gender makeup of the village was 48.6% male and 51.4% female.

=== 2000 census ===
As of the census of 2000, there were 103 people, 46 households, and 29 families residing in the village. The population density was 268.6 inhabitants per square mile (103.7/km^{2}). There were 51 housing units at an average density of 133.0 per square mile (51.4/km^{2}). The racial makeup of the village was 90.29% White, 5.83% from other races, and 3.88% from two or more races. Hispanic or Latino of any race were 15.53% of the population.

There were 46 households, out of which 21.7% had children under the age of 18 living with them, 47.8% were married couples living together, 13.0% had a female householder with no husband present, and 34.8% were non-families. 28.3% of all households were made up of individuals, and 6.5% had someone living alone who was 65 years of age or older. The average household size was 2.24 and the average family size was 2.67.

In the village, the population was spread out, with 21.4% under the age of 18, 3.9% from 18 to 24, 27.2% from 25 to 44, 33.0% from 45 to 64, and 14.6% who were 65 years of age or older. The median age was 44 years. For every 100 females, there were 114.6 males. For every 100 females age 18 and over, there were 113.2 males.

As of 2000 the median income for a household in the village was $23,750, and the median income for a family was $25,000. Males had a median income of $20,625 versus $18,750 for females. The per capita income for the village was $12,078. There were 3.6% of families and 9.8% of the population living below the poverty line, including 21.4% of under eighteens and none of those over 64.

== See also ==
- List of municipalities in Nebraska
