= Lexington micropolitan area, Nebraska =

Lexington, Nebraska Area
- Micropolitan Statistical Area
- Lexington, NE Micropolitan Statistical Area
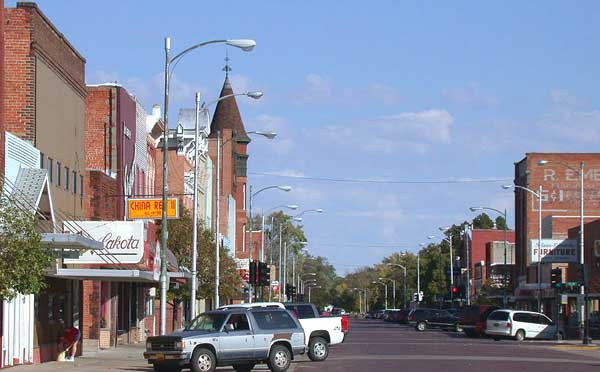
- Downtown Lexington, looking north (2004)
Interactive Map of Kearney, NE μSA
City of Lexington
Lexington, NE μSA
- Country: United States
- State: Nebraska
- Largest city: Lexington
- Time zone: UTC−6 (CST)
  - Summer (DST): UTC−5 (CDT)

The Lexington micropolitan statistical area, as defined by the United States Census Bureau, is an area consisting of two counties in Nebraska, anchored by the city of Lexington.

As of the 2000 census, the μSA had a population of 26,508 (though a July 1, 2009 estimate placed the population at 26,920).

== Counties ==
- Dawson
- Gosper

== Communities ==
- Cozad
- Eddyville
- Elwood
- Farnam
- Gothenburg
- Lexington (Principal City)
- Overton
- Smithfield
- Sumner

== Demographics ==
As of the census of 2000, there were 26,508 people, 9,687 households, and 6,928 families residing within the μSA. The racial makeup of the μSA was 83.65% White, 0.29% African American, 0.63% Native American, 0.63% Asian, 0.01% Pacific Islander, 13.35% from other races, and 1.44% from two or more races. Hispanic or Latino of any race were 23.41% of the population.

The median income for a household in the μSA was $36,480, and the median income for a family was $42,463. Males had a median income of $27,851 versus $20,887 for females. The per capita income for the μSA was $16,965.

== See also ==
- Nebraska census statistical areas
