= Darr, Nebraska =

Unincorporated community in Dawson County, Nebraska, United States

- Unincorporated community
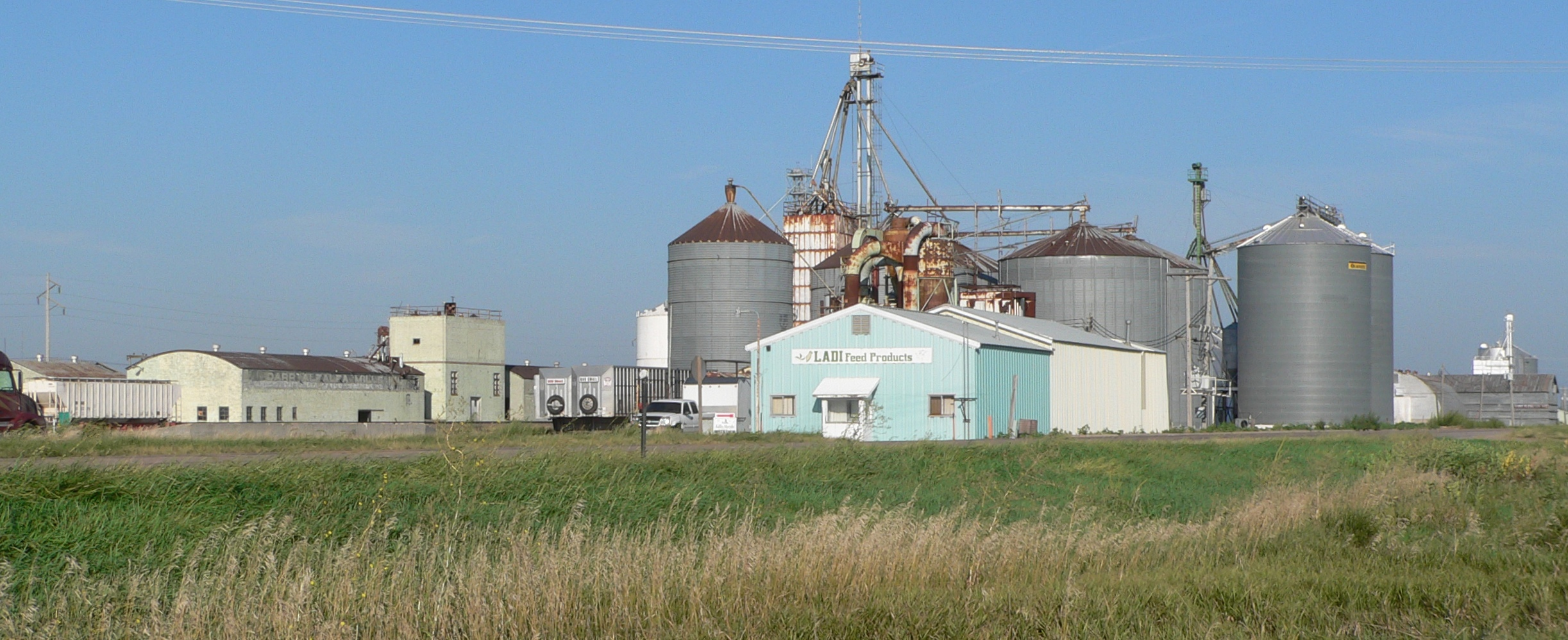

- Location within Nebraska Location within the United States
- Coordinates: 40°49′15″N 99°53′01″W
- Country: United States
- State: Nebraska
- County: Dawson
- Elevation: 2,451 ft (747 m)
- Time zone: UTC-6 (Central (CST))
  - Summer (DST): UTC-5 (CDT)
- Area code: 308
- GNIS feature ID: 828579

Darr (also Cayote, Coyote) is an unincorporated community in Dawson County, Nebraska, United States. Darr is located on U.S. Route 30 and Nebraska Highway 21 between Cozad and Lexington. Its elevation is 2,451 feet (747 m). Darr appears on the Cozad USGS map.

== History ==
A post office was established at Darr in 1902, and remained in operation until it was discontinued in 1923. The community was named for George B. Darr, the original owner of the town site.
