= Morrill, Nebraska =

Village in Scotts Bluff County, Nebraska, United States

- Village
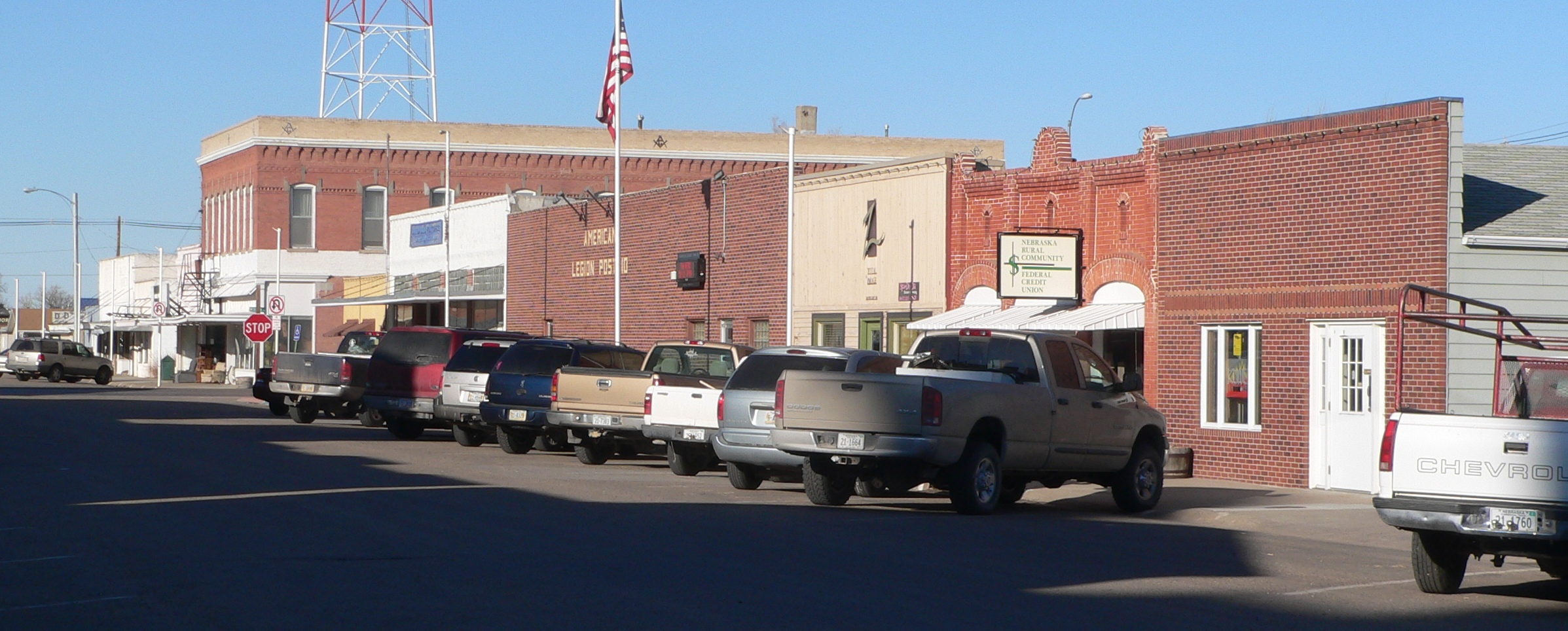
- Downtown Morrill, February 2012

- Location of Morrill, Nebraska
- Coordinates: 41°57′51″N 103°55′30″W
- Country: United States
- State: Nebraska
- County: Scotts Bluff

Area
  - Total: 0.61 sq mi (1.58 km^{2})
  - Land: 0.61 sq mi (1.58 km^{2})
  - Water: 0 sq mi (0.00 km^{2})
- Elevation: 3,990 ft (1,220 m)

Population (2020)
  - Total: 934
  - Density: 1,536/sq mi (592.9/km^{2})
- Time zone: UTC-7 (Mountain (MST))
  - Summer (DST): UTC-6 (MDT)
- ZIP code: 69358
- Area code: 308
- FIPS code: 31-32830
- GNIS feature ID: 2399397
- Website: villageofmorrill.com

Morrill is a village located in Scotts Bluff County, Nebraska, United States, in the western Panhandle of the state. Morrill is part of the Scottsbluff, Nebraska Micropolitan Statistical Area. As of the 2020 census, Morrill had a population of 934.

== History ==
In 1886, settlers from the vicinity of Fort Collins, Colorado found a fertile valley at the mouth of the Sheep Creek draw about a mile north of present-day Morrill. There, they established a settlement to which they gave the name of Collins.

In the early 1900s, the impending arrival of the Burlington Railroad in the vicinity prompted the relocation of the town. Spurred by the rumor that a depot would be built in the area, Charles Henry Morrill, president of the Lincoln Land Company, platted the new townsite about a mile from Collins. The new settlement, which bore Morrill's name, was incorporated in 1907.

== Geography ==
According to the United States Census Bureau, the village has a total area of 0.60 square miles (1.55 km^{2}), all land.

== Demographics ==
Historical population
Census	Pop.	Note	%±
1910	346		—
1920	772		123.1%
1930	756		−2.1%
1940	877		16.0%
1950	849		−3.2%
1960	884		4.1%
1970	937		6.0%
1980	1,097		17.1%
1990	974		−11.2%
2000	957		−1.7%
2010	921		−3.8%
2020	934		1.4%
U.S. Decennial Census

=== 2010 census ===
As of the census of 2010, there were 921 people, 417 households, and 262 families residing in the village. The population density was 1,535.0 inhabitants per square mile (592.7/km^{2}). There were 446 housing units at an average density of 743.3 per square mile (287.0/km^{2}). The racial makeup of the village was 93.3% White, 1.3% Native American, 0.5% Asian, 3.6% from other races, and 1.3% from two or more races. Hispanic or Latino of any race were 10.1% of the population.

There were 417 households, of which 24.5% had children under the age of 18 living with them, 49.9% were married couples living together, 9.4% had a female householder with no husband present, 3.6% had a male householder with no wife present, and 37.2% were non-families. 33.8% of all households were made up of individuals, and 16.1% had someone living alone who was 65 years of age or older. The average household size was 2.21 and the average family size was 2.80.

The median age in the village was 44.1 years. 21% of residents were under the age of 18; 8% were between the ages of 18 and 24; 22.7% were from 25 to 44; 26.5% were from 45 to 64; and 21.8% were 65 years of age or older. The gender makeup of the village was 47.9% male and 52.1% female.

=== 2000 census ===
As of the census of 2000, there were 957 people, 416 households, and 264 families residing in the village. The population density was 1,610.2 inhabitants per square mile (621.7/km^{2}). There were 445 housing units at an average density of 748.7 per square mile (289.1/km^{2}). The racial makeup of the village was 91.75% White, 0.10% African American, 1.46% Native American, 0.52% Asian, 5.64% from other races, and 0.52% from two or more races. Hispanic or Latino of any race were 13.69% of the population.

There were 416 households, out of which 24.5% had children under the age of 18 living with them, 54.8% were married couples living together, 5.8% had a female householder with no husband present, and 36.3% were non-families. 33.2% of all households were made up of individuals, and 15.1% had someone living alone who was 65 years of age or older. The average household size was 2.30 and the average family size was 2.94.

In the village, the population was spread out, with 22.5% under the age of 18, 6.0% from 18 to 24, 23.3% from 25 to 44, 27.2% from 45 to 64, and 21.1% who were 65 years of age or older. The median age was 44 years. For every 100 females, there were 89.1 males. For every 100 females age 18 and over, there were 90.3 males.

As of 2000 the median income for a household in the village was $31,450, and the median income for a family was $37,639. Males had a median income of $31,750 versus $19,500 for females. The per capita income for the village was $20,191. About 4.4% of families and 7.6% of the population were below the poverty line, including 9.3% of those under age 18 and 9.9% of those age 65 or over.

== Highways ==
- U.S. Highway 26 - east-west highway through Morrill.
- N-79D Nebraska Route 79-D (So. Morrill Road)

== See also ==
- List of municipalities in Nebraska
