= Scottsbluff micropolitan area =

- Micropolitan statistical area
- Scottsbluff, NE Micropolitan Statistical Area
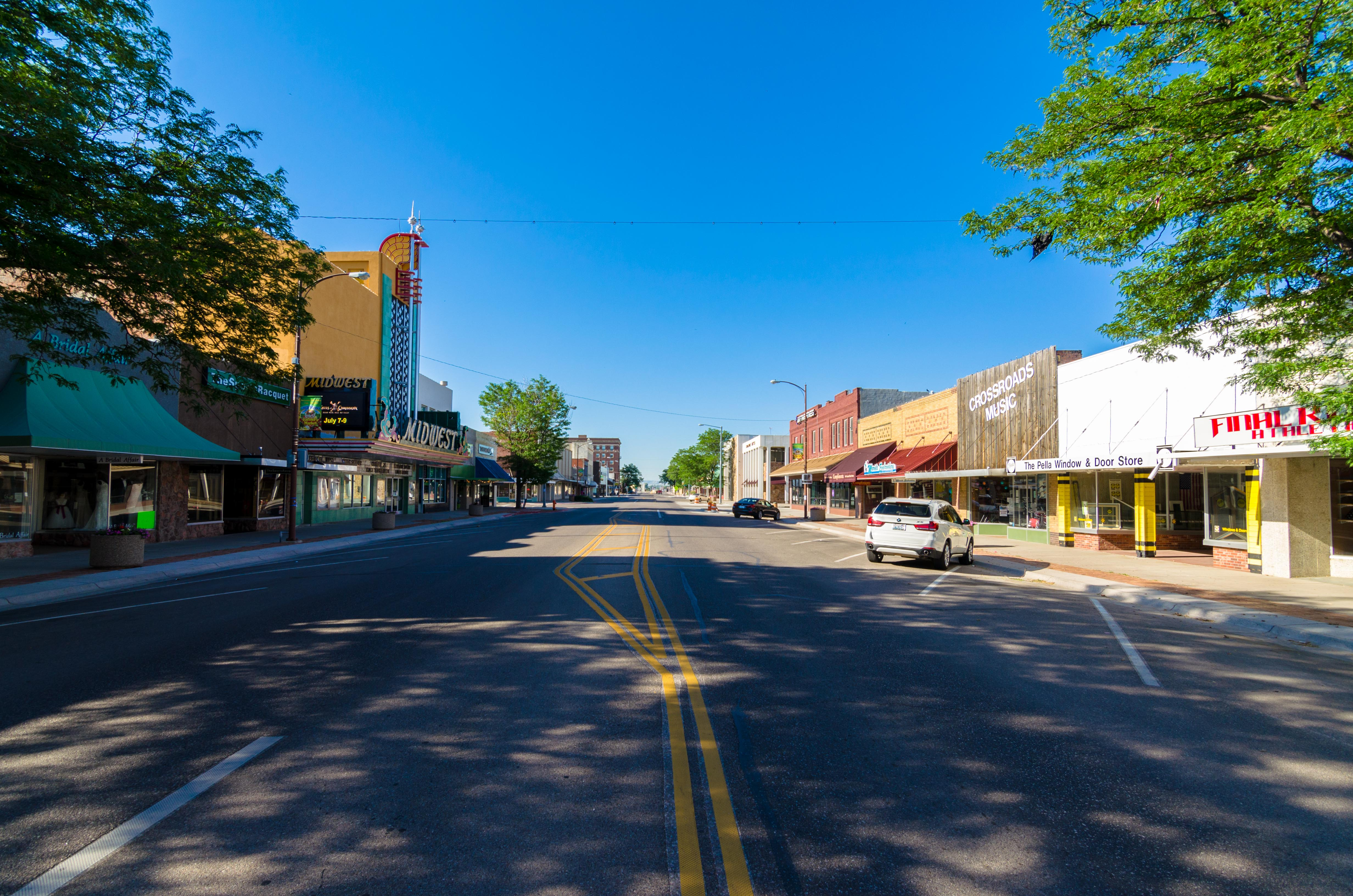
- Looking South on Broadway in Downtown Scottsbluff, July 2017
Interactive map of Scottsbluff, Nebraska, μSA
City of Scottsbluff
Scottsbluff, Nebraska μSA
- Country: United States
- State: Nebraska
- Largest city: Scottsbluff

Area
  - Total: 3,558 sq mi (9,220 km^{2})
  - Land: 3,551.1 sq mi (9,197 km^{2})
  - Water: 6.9 sq mi (18 km^{2})

Population (2020)
  - Total: 37,893
  - Estimate (2022): 37,390
  - Density: 10.671/sq mi (4.1200/km^{2})
- Time zone: UTC−7 (MST)
  - Summer (DST): UTC−6 (MDT)

The Scottsbluff micropolitan statistical area, as defined by the United States Census Bureau, is an area consisting of three counties in Nebraska, anchored by the city of Scottsbluff.

As of the 2020 census, the μSA had a population of 37,893 (though a July 1, 2022 estimate placed the population at 37,390).

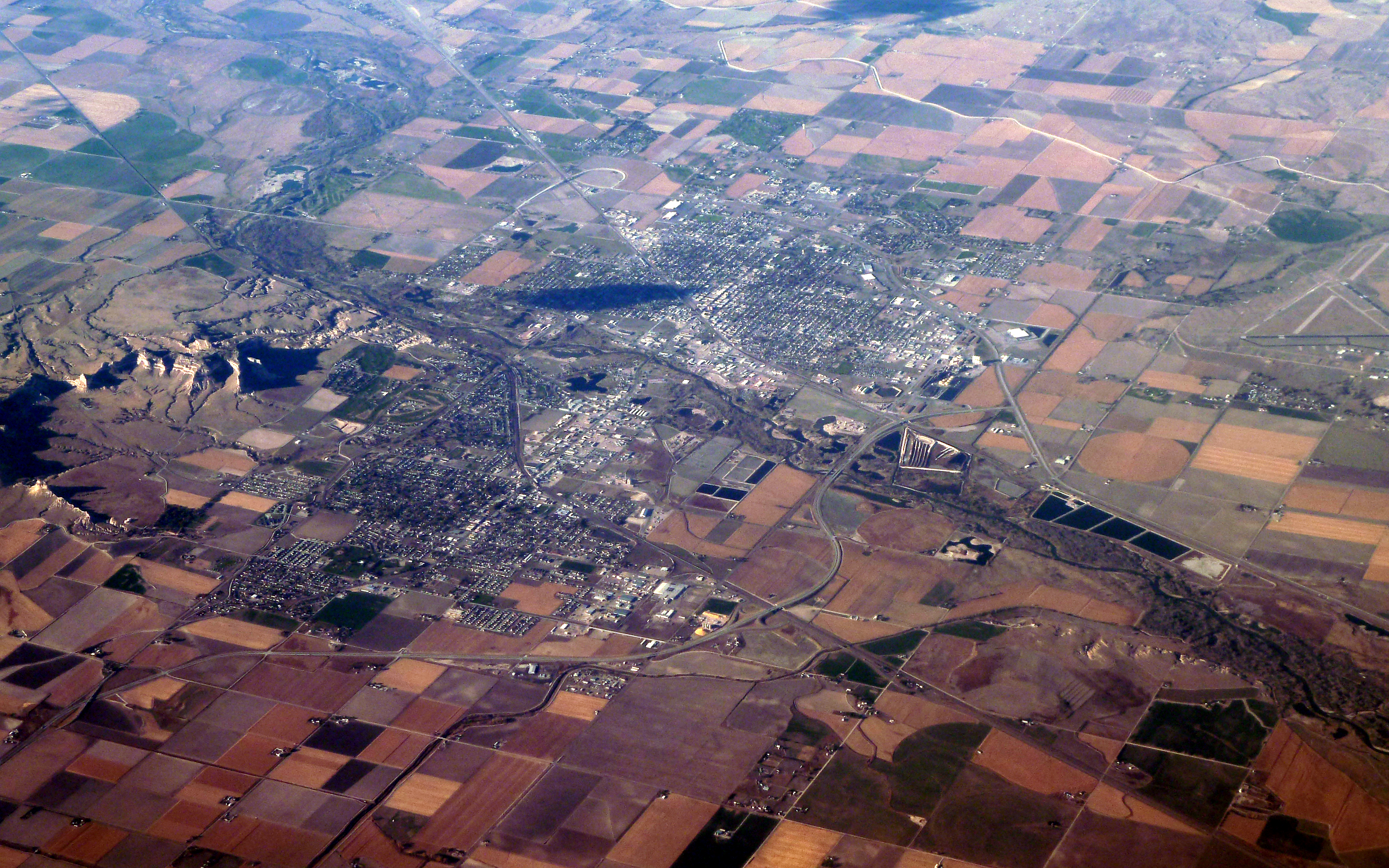
Aerial View of the Scottsbluff Micropolitan Statistical Area.

== Counties ==
- Banner
- Scotts Bluff

== Communities ==
- Gering
- Harrisburg
- Henry
- Lyman
- McGrew
- Melbeta
- Minatare
- Mitchell
- Morrill
- Scottsbluff (Principal City)
- Terrytown

== Demographics ==
Historical population
Census	Pop.	Note	%±
1990	38,426		—
2000	39,245		2.1%
2010	38,971		−0.7%
2020	37,893		−2.8%
2022 (est.)	37,390		−1.3%

As of the census of 2000, there were 37,770 people, 15,198 households, and 10,404 families residing within the μSA. The racial makeup of the μSA was 87.76% White, 0.26% African American, 1.84% Native American, 0.56% Asian, 0.04% Pacific Islander, 7.92% from other races, and 1.61% from two or more races. Hispanic or Latino of any race were 16.94% of the population.

The median income for a household in the μSA was $31,678, and the median income for a family was $40,235. Males had a median income of $27,784 versus $19,734 for females. The per capita income for the μSA was $17,252.

== See also ==
- Nebraska census statistical areas
