= Buffalo, Nebraska =

Unincorporated community in Nebraska, United States

- Unincorporated Community
- Location within Nebraska Location within the United States
- Coordinates: 41°N 99.8°W
- Country: United States
- State: Nebraska
- County: Dawson

Buffalo is an unincorporated community in Dawson County, Nebraska, United States.

== History ==
A post office was established at Buffalo in 1896, and remained in operation until it was discontinued in 1957. Buffalo was named for the American bison (buffalo) which once roamed the area.
