= Eddyville, Nebraska =

- Village
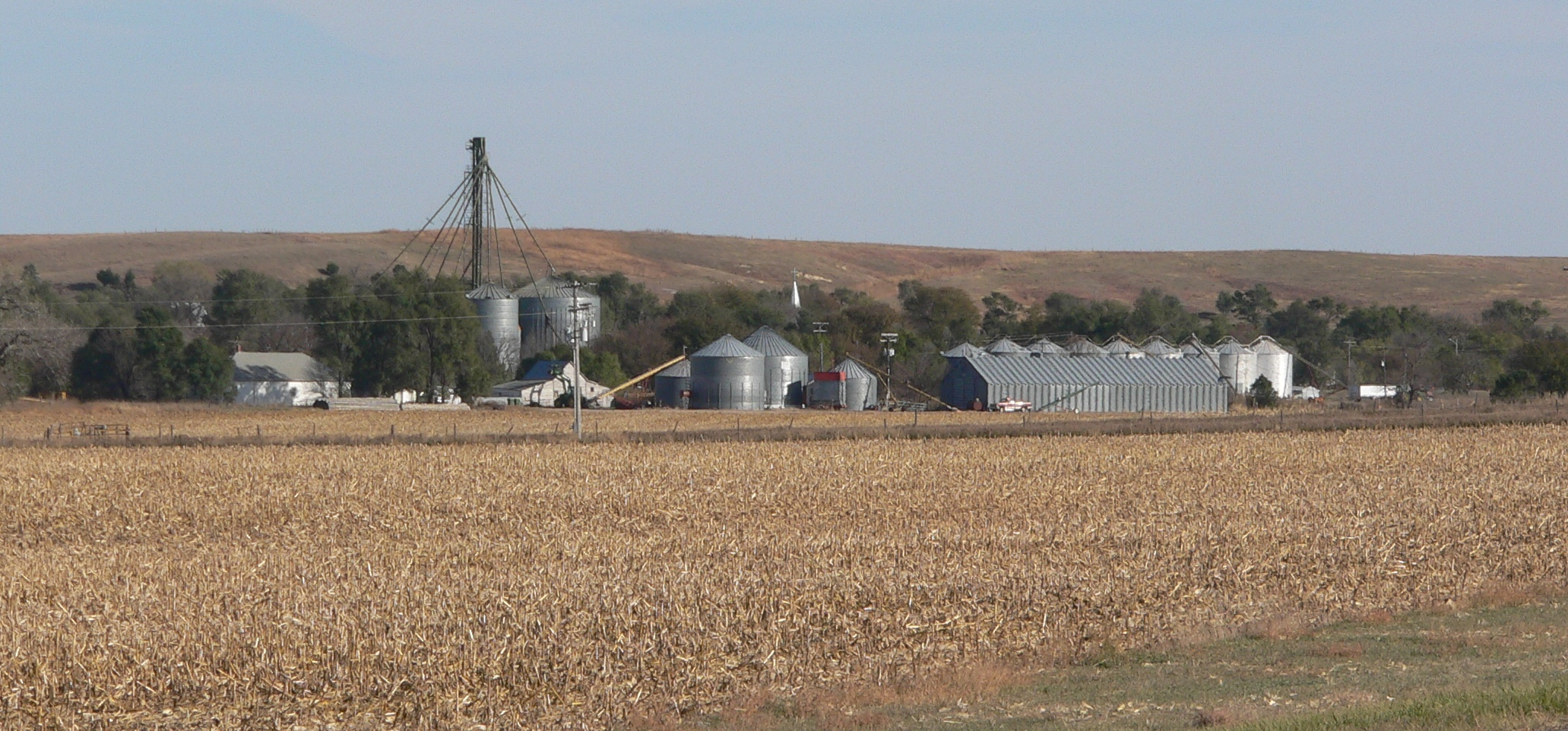
- Eddyville, seen from Nebraska Highway 40 to the northwest

- Location of Eddyville, Nebraska
- Coordinates: 41°00′44″N 99°37′26″W
- Country: United States
- State: Nebraska
- County: Dawson

Area
  - Total: 0.27 sq mi (0.71 km^{2})
  - Land: 0.27 sq mi (0.71 km^{2})
  - Water: 0 sq mi (0.00 km^{2})
- Elevation: 2,444 ft (745 m)

Population (2020)
  - Total: 88
  - Density: 319.2/sq mi (123.26/km^{2})
- Time zone: UTC-6 (Central (CST))
  - Summer (DST): UTC-5 (CDT)
- ZIP code: 68834
- Area code: 308
- FIPS code: 31-14380
- GNIS feature ID: 2398783
- Website: eddyvillene.com

Eddyville is a village in Dawson County, Nebraska, United States. It is part of the Lexington, Nebraska Micropolitan Statistical Area. As of the 2020 census, Eddyville had a population of 88.

== History ==
Eddyville was platted ca. the late 1880s when the railroad was extended to that point. It was named after the city of Eddyville, Iowa. Eddyville became a shipping point on the Union Pacific Railroad.

== Geography ==
According to the United States Census Bureau, the village has a total area of 0.28 square miles (0.73 km^{2}), all land.

== Demographics ==
Historical population
Census	Pop.	Note	%±
1900	101		—
1910	254		151.5%
1920	227		−10.6%
1930	224		−1.3%
1940	237		5.8%
1950	186		−21.5%
1960	119		−36.0%
1970	128		7.6%
1980	121		−5.5%
1990	102		−15.7%
2000	96		−5.9%
2010	97		1.0%
2020	88		−9.3%
U.S. Decennial Census

=== 2010 census ===
As of the census of 2010, there were 97 people, 38 households, and 28 families residing in the village. The population density was 346.4 inhabitants per square mile (133.7/km^{2}). There were 43 housing units at an average density of 153.6 per square mile (59.3/km^{2}). The racial makeup of the village was 90.7% White and 9.3% from other races. Hispanic or Latino of any race were 9.3% of the population.

There were 38 households, of which 34.2% had children under the age of 18 living with them, 63.2% were married couples living together, 5.3% had a female householder with no husband present, 5.3% had a male householder with no wife present, and 26.3% were non-families. 23.7% of all households were made up of individuals, and 7.9% had someone living alone who was 65 years of age or older. The average household size was 2.55 and the average family size was 3.07.

The median age in the village was 42.5 years. 22.7% of residents were under the age of 18; 8.2% were between the ages of 18 and 24; 24.8% were from 25 to 44; 33.9% were from 45 to 64; and 10.3% were 65 years of age or older. The gender makeup of the village was 54.6% male and 45.4% female.

=== 2000 census ===
As of the census of 2000, there were 96 people, 41 households, and 28 families residing in the village. The population density was 351.7 inhabitants per square mile (135.8/km^{2}). There were 44 housing units at an average density of 161.2 per square mile (62.2/km^{2}). The racial makeup of the village was 100.00% White.

There were 41 households, out of which 26.8% had children under the age of 18 living with them, 63.4% were married couples living together, and 31.7% were non-families. 29.3% of all households were made up of individuals, and 7.3% had someone living alone who was 65 years of age or older. The average household size was 2.34 and the average family size was 2.93.

In the village, the population was spread out, with 22.9% under the age of 18, 5.2% from 18 to 24, 22.9% from 25 to 44, 31.3% from 45 to 64, and 17.7% who were 65 years of age or older. The median age was 44 years. For every 100 females, there were 95.9 males. For every 100 females age 18 and over, there were 117.6 males.

As of 2000 the median income for a household in the village was $28,125, and the median income for a family was $33,750. Males had a median income of $28,750 versus $21,667 for females. The per capita income for the village was $14,542. There were 9.1% of families and 16.1% of the population living below the poverty line, including 32.0% of under eighteens and 14.3% of those over 64.

== Education ==
It is in the Sumner-Eddyville-Miller Schools school district.
