= Lake Minatare Lighthouse =

Lighthouse in Nebraska, United States

Coordinates: 41°55′50″N 103°30′05″W

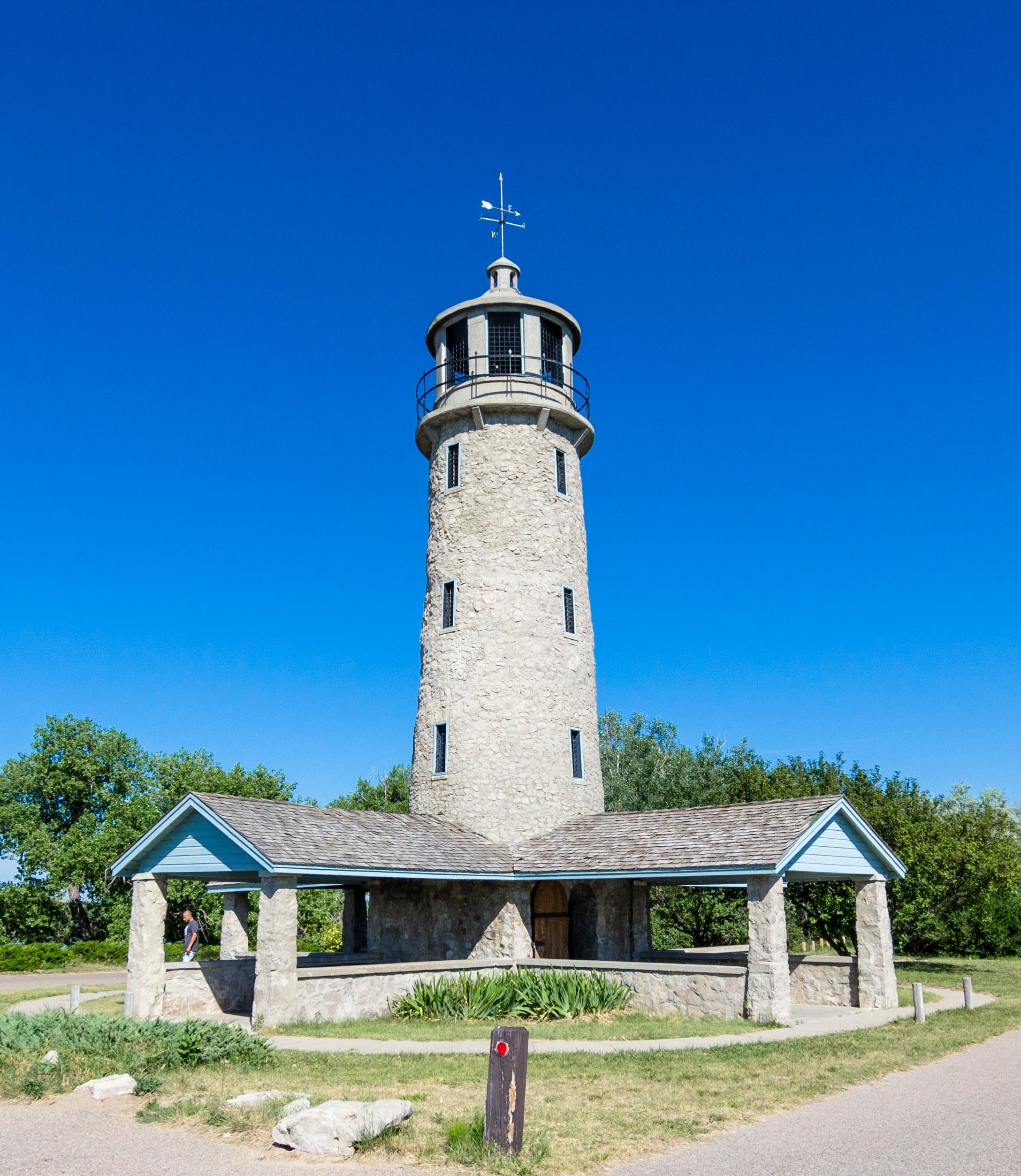
Lighthouse on Lake Minatare

The Lake Minatare Lighthouse is a historic mock lighthouse located on Lake Minatare near the city of Scottsbluff in Nebraska. The 55-foot (17 m) tower was built by the Veterans Conservation Corps in 1939 and is currently located within the North Platte National Wildlife Refuge. Designed as a combination shelter house and observation tower, it was "built to simulate a lighthouse."

== See also ==
- Geography of Nebraska
