= Dawson County, Nebraska =

County in Nebraska, United States

- County
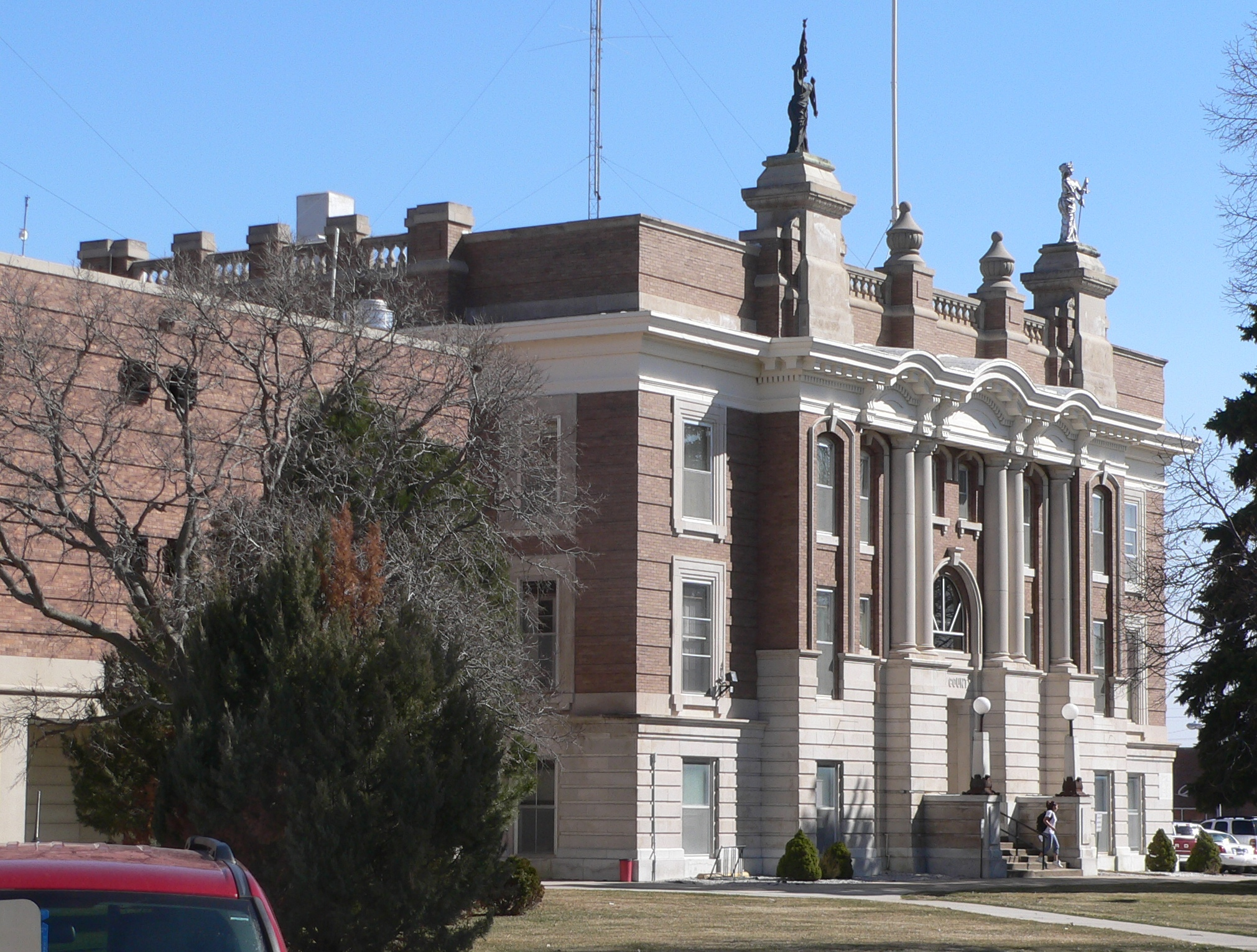
- The Dawson County Courthouse in Lexington

- Location within the U.S. state of Nebraska
- Coordinates: 40.867840°N 99.815583°W
- Country: United States
- State: Nebraska
- Created: January 11, 1860
- Organized: July 11, 1871
- Named for: Jacob Dawson
- Seat: Lexington
- Largest city: Lexington

Area
  - Total: 1,019.433 sq mi (2,640.32 km^{2})
  - Land: 1,013.786 sq mi (2,625.69 km^{2})
  - Water: 5.647 sq mi (14.63 km^{2}) 0.55%

Population (2020)
  - Total: 24,111
  - Estimate (2025): 24,452 ▲
  - Density: 23.783/sq mi (9.1827/km^{2})
- Time zone: UTC−6 (Central)
  - Summer (DST): UTC−5 (CDT)
- Area code: 308
- Congressional district: 3rd
- Website: dawsoncountyne.gov
- • Nebraska county number 24 • Nebraska license plate prefix 18

Dawson County is a county in the U.S. state of Nebraska. As of the 2020 census, the population was 24,111, and was estimated to be 24,452 in 2025. The county seat and the largest city is Lexington.

Dawson County is part of the Lexington, NE micropolitan area.

In the Nebraska license plate system, Dawson County was represented by the prefix "18" (as it had the 18th-largest number of vehicles registered in the state when the license plate system was established in 1922).

== History ==
Dawson County was created on January 11, 1860 and organized on July 11, 1871 by proclamation of acting Governor William James. The county website states that the county was named for Jacob Dawson, the first postmaster in the settlement of Lancaster County, Nebraska. Other sources state that it was named after Pennsylvania Congressman John Littleton Dawson.

== Geography ==
Dawson County lies near the center of Nebraska, in the portion of the state that observes Central Time.

According to the United States Census Bureau, the county has a total area of 1,019.433 square miles (2,640.32 km^{2}), of which 1,013.786 square miles (2,625.69 km^{2}) is land and 5.647 square miles (14.63 km^{2}) (0.55%) is water. It is the 15th-largest county in Nebraska by total area.

=== Major highways ===
- Interstate 80
- U.S. Highway 30
- U.S. Highway 283
- Nebraska Highway 21
- Nebraska Highway 23
- Nebraska Highway 40
- Nebraska Highway 47

=== Transit ===
- Burlington Trailways
- Express Arrow

=== Protected areas ===
- Bitterns Call State Wildlife Management Area
- Dogwood State Wildlife Management Area
- East Willow Island State Wildlife Management Area
- Gallagher Canyon State Recreation Area

=== Adjacent counties ===
- Buffalo County – east
- Phelps County – southeast
- Gosper County – south
- Frontier County – southwest
- Lincoln County – west
- Custer County – north

== Demographics ==
Historical population
Census	Pop.	Note	%±
1860	16		—
1870	103		543.8%
1880	2,909		2,724.3%
1890	10,129		248.2%
1900	12,264		21.1%
1910	15,961		30.1%
1920	16,004		0.3%
1930	17,875		11.7%
1940	17,890		0.1%
1950	19,393		8.4%
1960	19,405		0.1%
1970	19,771		1.9%
1980	22,304		12.8%
1990	19,940		−10.6%
2000	24,365		22.2%
2010	24,326		−0.2%
2020	24,111		−0.9%
2025 (est.)	24,452	▲	1.4%
U.S. Decennial Census; 1790–1960 1900–1990; 1990–2000 2010–2020

As of the third quarter of 2025, the median home value in Dawson County was $176,050.

As of the 2024 American Community Survey, there are 9,145 estimated households in Dawson County with an average of 2.62 persons per household. The county has a median household income of $69,880. Approximately 10.8% of the county's population lives at or below the poverty line. Dawson County has an estimated 69.1% employment rate, with 17.6% of the population holding a bachelor's degree or higher and 77.9% holding a high school diploma. There were 9,958 housing units at an average density of 9.82 per square mile (3.8/km^{2}).

The top five reported languages (people were allowed to report up to two languages, thus the figures will generally add to more than 100%) were English (62.8%), Spanish (31.3%), Indo-European (0.3%), Asian and Pacific Islander (0.8%), and Other (4.8%).

The median age in the county was 35.6 years.

Dawson County, Nebraska – racial and ethnic composition Note: the US Census treats Hispanic/Latino as an ethnic category. This table excludes Latinos from the racial categories and assigns them to a separate category. Hispanics/Latinos may be of any race.
Race / ethnicity (NH = non-Hispanic)	Pop. 1980	Pop. 1990	Pop. 2000	Pop. 2010	Pop. 2020
White alone (NH)	21,575 (96.73%)	19,164 (96.11%)	17,746 (72.83%)	15,464 (63.57%)	13,529 (56.11%)
Black or African American alone (NH)	14 (0.06%)	11 (0.06%)	58 (0.24%)	710 (2.92%)	1,187 (4.92%)
Native American or Alaska Native alone (NH)	35 (0.16%)	62 (0.31%)	112 (0.46%)	74 (0.30%)	44 (0.18%)
Asian alone (NH)	54 (0.24%)	38 (0.19%)	150 (0.62%)	135 (0.55%)	192 (0.80%)
Pacific Islander alone (NH)	—	—	1 (0.00%)	39 (0.16%)	41 (0.17%)
Other race alone (NH)	39 (0.17%)	2 (0.01%)	6 (0.02%)	21 (0.09%)	60 (0.25%)
Mixed race or multiracial (NH)	—	—	114 (0.47%)	137 (0.56%)	415 (1.72%)
Hispanic or Latino (any race)	587 (2.63%)	663 (3.32%)	6,178 (25.36%)	7,746 (31.84%)	8,643 (35.85%)
Total	22,304 (100.00%)	19,940 (100.00%)	24,365 (100.00%)	24,326 (100.00%)	24,111 (100.00%)

=== 2024 estimate ===
As of the 2024 estimate, there were 24,554 people, 9,145 households, and _ families residing in the county. The population density was 24.22 inhabitants per square mile (9.4/km^{2}). There were 9,958 housing units at an average density of 9.82 per square mile (3.8/km^{2}). The racial makeup of the county was 85.3% White (51.1% NH White), 8.5% African American, 2.9% Native American, 1.5% Asian, 0.5% Pacific Islander, _% from some other races and 1.5% from two or more races. Hispanic or Latino people of any race were 39.6% of the population.

=== 2020 census ===
As of the 2020 census, there were 24,111 people, 8,868 households, and 6,144 families residing in the county. The population density was 23.78 inhabitants per square mile (9.2/km^{2}). There were 9,792 housing units at an average density of 9.66 per square mile (3.7/km^{2}). The racial makeup of the county was 62.62% White, 5.02% African American, 1.12% Native American, 0.83% Asian, 0.19% Pacific Islander, 19.81% from some other races and 10.41% from two or more races. Hispanic or Latino people of any race were 35.85% of the population.

The median age was 36.4 years. 28.1% of residents were under the age of 18 and 16.4% of residents were 65 years of age or older. For every 100 females there were 102.6 males, and for every 100 females age 18 and over there were 101.2 males age 18 and over.

43.3% of residents lived in urban areas, while 56.7% lived in rural areas.

There were 8,868 households in the county, of which 35.7% had children under the age of 18 living with them and 22.6% had a female householder with no spouse or partner present. About 26.1% of all households were made up of individuals and 12.5% had someone living alone who was 65 years of age or older.

There were 9,792 housing units, of which 9.4% were vacant. Among occupied housing units, 67.9% were owner-occupied and 32.1% were renter-occupied. The homeowner vacancy rate was 1.6% and the rental vacancy rate was 8.9%.

=== 2010 census ===
As of the 2010 census, there were 24,326 people, 8,899 households, and 6,122 families residing in the county. The population density was 24.00 inhabitants per square mile (9.3/km^{2}). There were 10,123 housing units at an average density of 9.99 per square mile (3.9/km^{2}). The racial makeup of the county was 78.02% White, 3.06% African American, 0.82% Native American, 0.58% Asian, 0.18% Pacific Islander, 15.24% from some other races and 2.10% from two or more races. Hispanic or Latino people of any race were 31.84% of the population.

=== 2000 census ===
As of the 2000 census, there were 24,365 people, 8,824 households, and 6,273 families residing in the county. The population density was 24.03 inhabitants per square mile (9.3/km^{2}). There were 9,805 housing units at an average density of 9.67 per square mile (3.7/km^{2}). The racial makeup of the county was 82.32% White, 0.31% African American, 0.67% Native American, 0.66% Asian, 0.01% Pacific Islander, 14.49% from some other races and 1.53% from two or more races. Hispanic or Latino people of any race were 25.36% of the population. 32.0% were of German, 6.7% American, 6.7% Irish and 6.4% English ancestry.

There were 8,824 households out of which 35.80% have children under the age of 18 living with them, 58.80% were married couples living together, 7.90% have a female householder with no husband present, and 28.90% were non-families. 24.60% of all households were made up of individuals and 12.00% have someone living alone who was 65 years of age or older. The average household size was 2.71 and the average family size was 3.21.

In the county the population was spread out with 29.20% under the age of 18, 8.40% from 18 to 24, 27.60% from 25 to 44, 20.70% from 45 to 64, and 14.10% who were 65 years of age or older. The median age was 34 years. For every 100 females there were 101.70 males. For every 100 females age 18 and over, there were 100.90 males.

The median income for a household in the county was $36,132, and the median income for a family was $42,224. Males have a median income of $26,865 versus $20,569 for females. The per capita income for the county was $15,973. 10.80% of the population and 8.60% of families were below the poverty line. Out of the total people living in poverty, 14.20% were under the age of 18 and 9.20% were 65 or older.

== Communities ==
=== Cities ===
- Cozad
- Gothenburg
- Lexington (county seat)

=== Villages ===
- Eddyville
- Farnam
- Overton
- Sumner

=== Census-designated place ===
- Willow Island

=== Unincorporated communities ===
- Buffalo
- Darr
- Josselyn

== Politics ==
Political Party	Number of registered voters (March 1, 2026)	Percent
Republican	7,619	59.30%
Democratic	2,774	21.59%
Independent	2,234	17.39%
Libertarian	139	1.08%
Legal Marijuana Now	82	0.64%
Total	12,848	100.00%

United States presidential election results for Dawson County, Nebraska
Year	Republican		Democratic		Third party(ies)	
Year	No.	%	No.	%	No.	%
1880	347	65.97%	179	34.03%	0	0.00%
1884	686	63.23%	384	35.39%	15	1.38%
1888	1,087	61.31%	614	34.63%	72	4.06%
1892	1,188	48.23%	182	7.39%	1,093	44.38%
1896	1,128	44.29%	1,357	53.28%	62	2.43%
1900	1,280	46.36%	1,399	50.67%	82	2.97%
1904	1,712	61.52%	457	16.42%	614	22.06%
1908	1,737	46.05%	1,926	51.06%	109	2.89%
1912	449	13.22%	1,613	47.48%	1,335	39.30%
1916	1,444	40.74%	1,989	56.12%	111	3.13%
1920	3,384	65.99%	1,444	28.16%	300	5.85%
1924	3,016	50.67%	1,526	25.64%	1,410	23.69%
1928	5,125	74.25%	1,718	24.89%	59	0.85%
1932	2,859	38.09%	4,513	60.13%	133	1.77%
1936	3,573	46.39%	4,021	52.21%	108	1.40%
1940	5,445	66.02%	2,803	33.98%	0	0.00%
1944	5,017	68.85%	2,270	31.15%	0	0.00%
1948	4,203	61.75%	2,603	38.25%	0	0.00%
1952	7,130	79.66%	1,820	20.34%	0	0.00%
1956	6,503	76.13%	2,039	23.87%	0	0.00%
1960	6,480	73.07%	2,388	26.93%	0	0.00%
1964	4,577	54.70%	3,790	45.30%	0	0.00%
1968	5,221	71.97%	1,614	22.25%	419	5.78%
1972	6,211	81.35%	1,424	18.65%	0	0.00%
1976	5,413	67.79%	2,395	29.99%	177	2.22%
1980	6,689	77.70%	1,463	16.99%	457	5.31%
1984	6,887	81.92%	1,487	17.69%	33	0.39%
1988	5,529	71.30%	2,184	28.16%	42	0.54%
1992	4,714	53.64%	1,741	19.81%	2,334	26.56%
1996	4,794	59.44%	2,180	27.03%	1,091	13.53%
2000	5,511	73.41%	1,740	23.18%	256	3.41%
2004	6,149	77.29%	1,728	21.72%	79	0.99%
2008	5,460	68.37%	2,399	30.04%	127	1.59%
2012	5,460	69.47%	2,199	27.98%	200	2.54%
2016	5,984	69.30%	2,136	24.74%	515	5.96%
2020	6,524	70.98%	2,497	27.17%	170	1.85%
2024	6,312	74.07%	2,101	24.65%	109	1.28%

== Education ==
School districts include:

- Callaway Public Schools #180, Callaway
- Cozad Community Schools #11, Cozad
- Elm Creek Public Schools #9, Elm Creek
- Elwood Public Schools #30, Elwood
- Eustis-Farnam Public Schools #95, Eustis
- Gothenburg Public Schools #20, Gothenburg
- Lexington Public Schools #1, Lexington
- Overton Public Schools #4, Overton
- Sumner-Eddyville-Miller Schools #101, Sumner

== See also ==
- National Register of Historic Places listings in Dawson County, Nebraska
- Robert Henri Museum in Cozad
