= Ionia (disambiguation) =

Ionia was an ancient region of southwestern coastal Anatolia (in present-day Turkey).

Ionia may also refer to:

== Places ==
=== Greece ===
- Ionian Islands
- Ionia, Chios

=== United States ===
- Ionia, Iowa
- Ionia Township, Jewell County, Kansas
  - Ionia, Kansas
- Ionia County, Michigan
  - Ionia, Michigan
  - Ionia Township, Michigan
- Ionia, Missouri
- Ionia, Nebraska
- Ionia, New York (disambiguation), multiple locations
- Ionia (Trevilians, Virginia), a historic plantation house
- Ionia Volcano, east of Newcastle, Nebraska, U.S.

=== Other places ===
- Ionia (satrapy), in the First Persian Empire

=== Fictional locations ===
- Ionia, a fictional place in the video game League of Legends

== People and characters ==
- Ionia, stage name for Clémentine de Vère (1888–1973), magician and illusionist
- Ionia, a fictional character in the video game Mother 3

== Other uses ==
- Ionia (album), by Lycia, 1991
- Ionia (novel), by Alexander Craig, 1898

== See also ==
- Ionic (disambiguation), including "Ionian"
