= Ionic =

Ionic or Ionian may refer to:

== Arts and entertainment ==
- Ionic meter, a poetic metre in ancient Greek and Latin poetry
- Ionian mode, a musical mode or a diatonic scale

== Places and peoples ==
- Ionian, of or from Ionia, an ancient region in western Anatolia
- Ionians, one of four major tribes of the ancient Greeks
- Ionian Sea, part of the Mediterranean Sea
- Ionian Islands, a group of islands in Greece

== Science ==
- Ionian, of or relating to Io, a moon of the planet Jupiter
- Ionian stage, a proposed name for the now-defined Chibanian stage in stratigraphy.
- Ionic, of or relating to an ion, an atom or molecule with a net electric charge
- Ionic bonding, a type chemical bonding
- Ionic compound, a chemical compound involving ionic bonding

== Other uses ==
- Ionic Greek, an ancient dialect of the Greek language
- Ionic (mobile app framework), a software development kit
- Ionic order, one of the orders of classical architecture
- Ionian Technologies, an American biotechnology company
- Hull Ionians, an English rugby club
- Ionic No. 5, a typeface
- SS Ionic, the name of two ships of the White Star Line

== See also ==
- Ioniq, an automotive brand of the Hyundai Motor Company
- Ion (disambiguation)
- Ionia (disambiguation)
- Ionian School (disambiguation)
- Ionica (disambiguation)
- Ionikos (disambiguation)
- Iona, an island in the Inner Hebrides of Scotland
