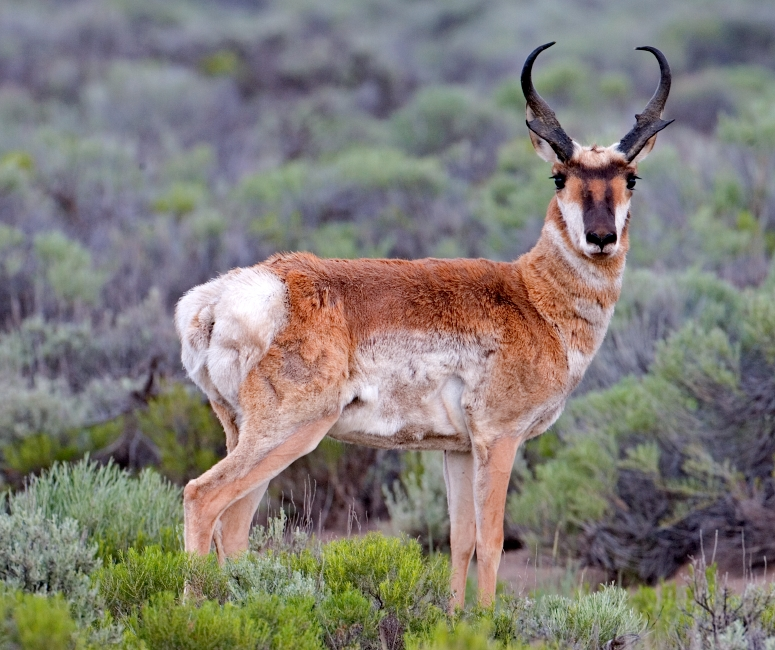
- Adult male pronghorn in Oregon
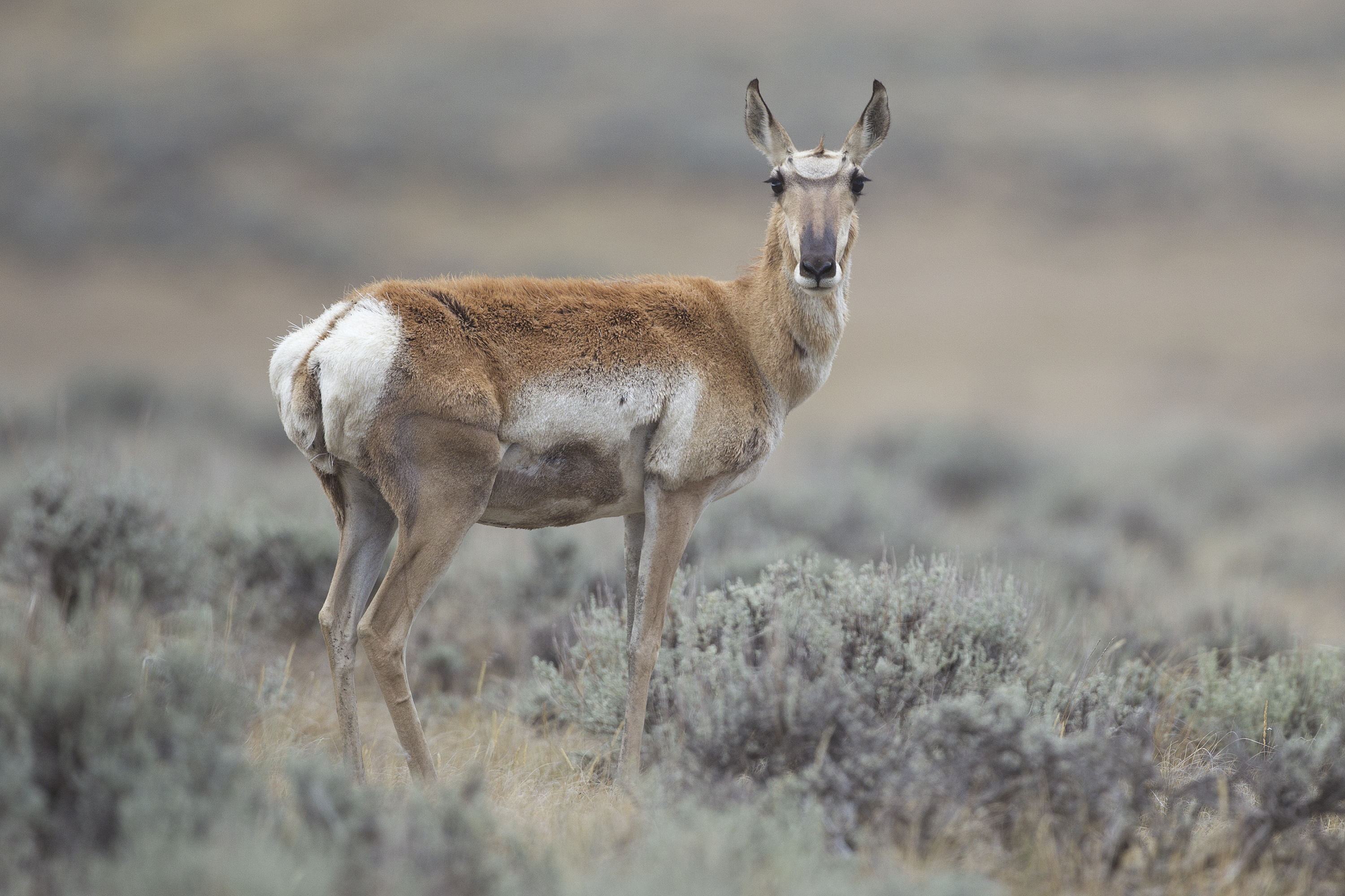
- Adult female pronghorn in Wyoming

Conservation status
- Least Concern (IUCN 3.1)
- CITES Appendix I (Note: Only populations of Mexico)

Scientific classification
- Kingdom: Animalia
- Phylum: Chordata
- Class: Mammalia
- Order: Artiodactyla
- Family: Antilocapridae
- Subfamily: Antilocaprinae
- Tribe: Antilocaprini
- Genus: Antilocapra
- Species: A. americana

Binomial name
- Antilocapra americana (Ord, 1815)

Subspecies
- A. a. americana A. a. mexicana A. a. oregona A. a. peninsularis A. a. sonoriensis
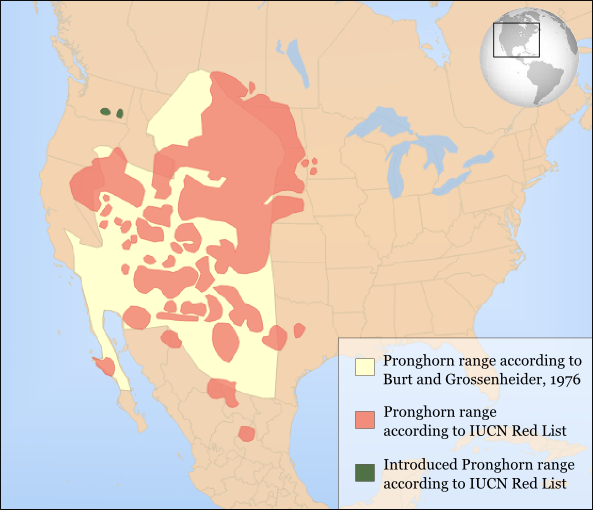
- Range of the pronghorn

= Pronghorn =

Pronghorn Temporal range: 0.11–0 Ma Late Pleistocene – recent

Species of North American hoofed mammal

The pronghorn (UK: /ˈprɒŋ.hɔːrn/, US: /ˈprɔːŋ.-/) (Antilocapra americana) is a species of artiodactyl (even-toed, hoofed) mammal indigenous to interior western and central North America. Though not an antelope, it is known colloquially in North America as the American antelope, prong buck, pronghorn antelope, and prairie antelope, because it closely resembles the antelopes of the Old World and fills a similar ecological niche due to parallel evolution. It is the only surviving member of the family Antilocapridae.

During the Pleistocene epoch, about 11 other antilocaprid species existed in North America, many with long or spectacularly twisted horns. Three other genera (Capromeryx, Stockoceros and Tetrameryx) existed when humans entered North America, but are now extinct.

The pronghorn's closest living relatives are the giraffe and okapi. The antilocaprids are part of the infraorder Pecora, making them distant relatives of deer, bovids, and moschids.

The pronghorn is the fastest land mammal in the Americas, with running speeds up to 55 mph (88.5 km/h). It is the symbol of the American Society of Mammalogists.

== Etymology ==
The animal gets its name from its horn sheaths that branch and have a forward-pointing tine, unlike the horns of species from the ox family Bovidae.

== European discovery ==
Pronghorns were first seen and described by Spanish explorers in the 16th century, but the species was not formally recorded or scrutinized until the expedition in 1804–1806 by Captain Meriwether Lewis and Second Lieutenant William Clark. Following the discovery of a few subspecies of the sharp-tailed grouse, Lewis and Clark came across the pronghorn near the mouth of the Niobrara River, in present-day Nebraska. Clark was among the first Euro-Americans to publish the experience of killing a pronghorn, and described his experience as follows:

I walked on shore to find an old Vulcanoe [the Ionia Volcano?] ... in my walk I killed a Buck Goat of this Countrey, about the height of the Grown Deer, its body Shorter the horns which is not very hard and forks 2/3 up one prong Short the other round & Sharp arched, and is immediately above its Eyes the Color is a light gray with black behind its ears down the neck, and its face white round its neck, its Sides and its rump round its tail which is Short & white; Verry actively made, has only a pair of hoofs to each foot, his brains on the back of his head, his Nostrals large, his eyes like a Sheep he is more like the Antilope or Gazelle of Africa than any other Species of Goat.

The pronghorn was first officially described by American ornithologist George Ord in 1815.

== Description ==
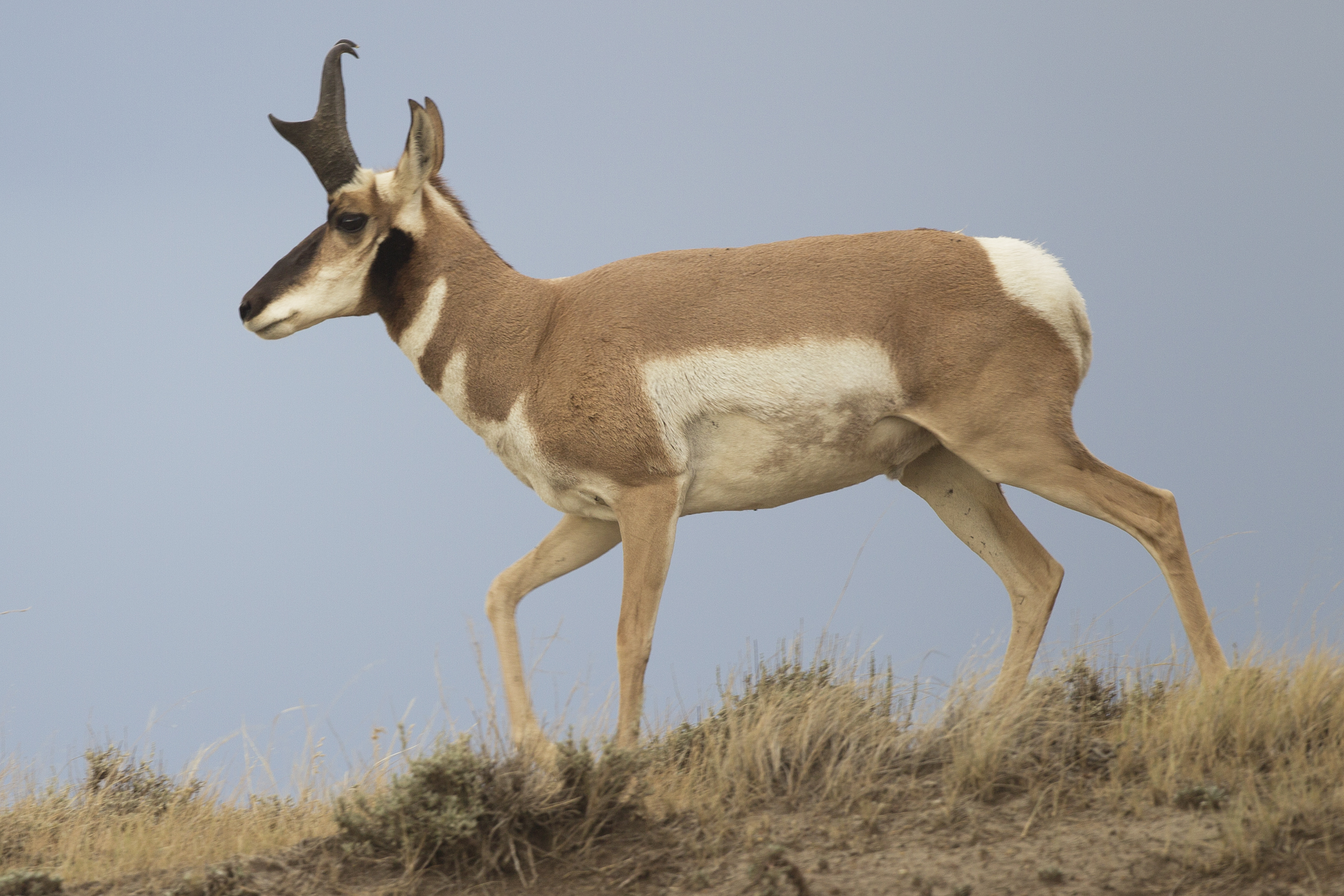
Profile of an adult male

Pronghorns have distinct white fur on their rumps, sides, bellies, breasts, and across their throats. Adult males are 4.3–4.9 ft (1.3–1.5 m) long from nose to tail, stand 2.7–3.4 ft (82–104 cm) high at the shoulder, and weigh 88–143 lb (40–65 kg). The females are the same height as males, but weigh 75–106 lb (34–48 kg). The feet have two hooves, with no dewclaws. Their body temperature is 100 °F (38 °C).

=== Head ===
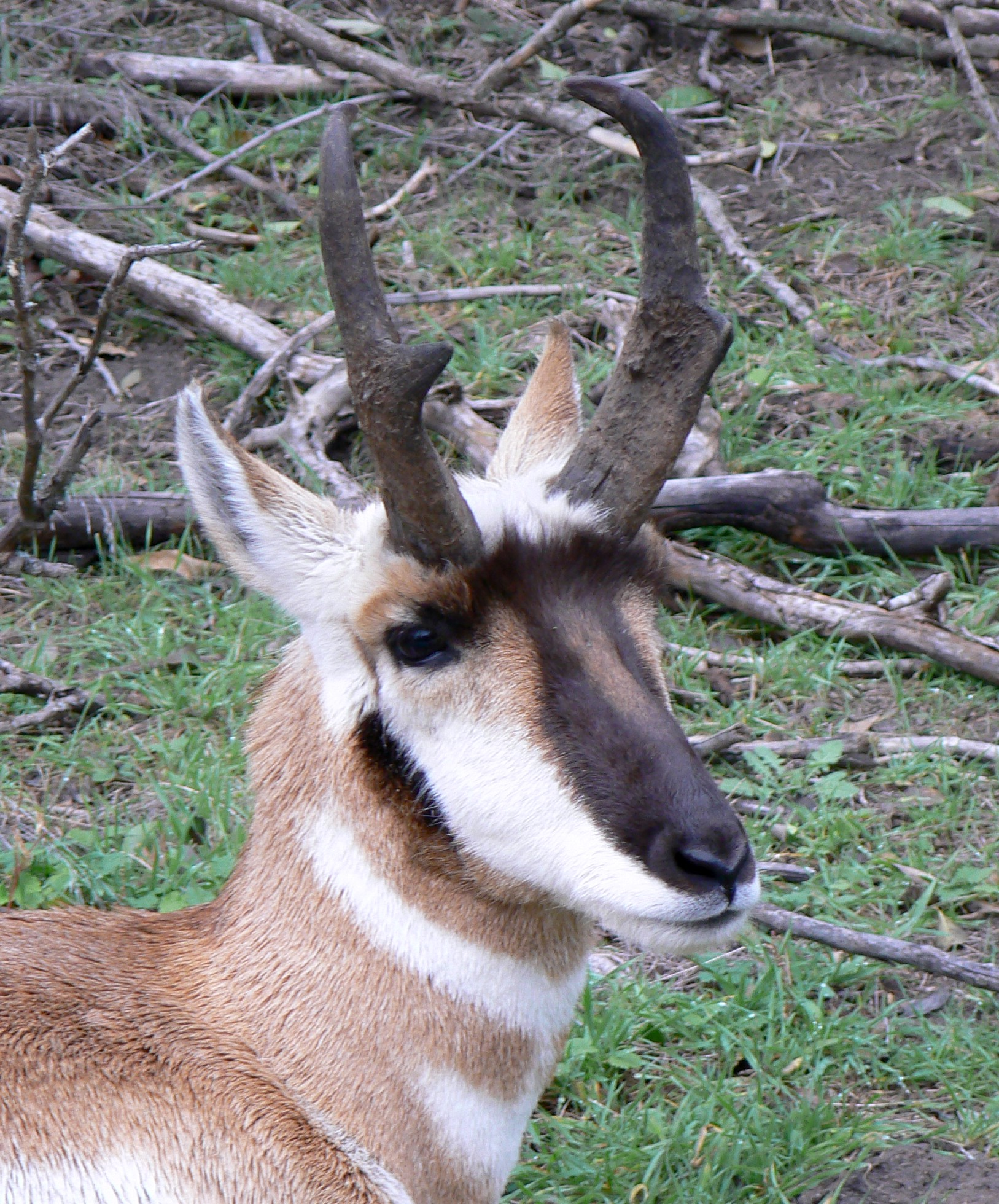
Head of an adult male

They have very large eyes with a 320° field of vision. Their orbits (eye sockets) are prominent and set high on the skull. Their teeth are hypsodont and their dental formula is 0.0.3.33.1.3.3. Unlike deer, pronghorns possess a gallbladder.

Each horn of the pronghorn is composed of a slender, laterally flattened blade of bone, which is thought to grow from the frontal bones of the skull, or from the subcutaneous tissues of the scalp, forming a permanent core. As in the Giraffidae, skin covers the bony cores, but in the pronghorn, it develops into a keratinous sheath, which is shed and regrown annually. Males have a horn sheath about 4.9–17 in (12 1/2–43 1/4 cm) (average 9.8 in or 25 cm) long with a prong. Females have smaller horns that range from 0.4–2.4 in (1–6 cm) (average 4.7 in or 12 cm) and sometimes barely visible; they are straight and very rarely pronged.

Males are further differentiated from females in having a small patch of black hair at the angle of the mandible. Pronghorns have a distinct, musky odor. Males mark territory with a preorbital scent gland on the sides of the head.

=== Scent glands ===
The preorbital gland's secretion contains the highly odoriferous compound, 2-ethyl-3-methylpyrazine, which is also the major volatile component found on the animal's back in the male's medial gland.

Male and female animals have glands that are exposed when the white hair on the rump stands up. 2-Pyrrolidinone, the major compound in the rump gland, has an odor reminiscent of buttered popcorn to humans. The flared rump hair and odor alert adjacent animals of a possible danger.

Pronghorns have well developed glands on each hoof. Like many ungulates, these interdigital (hoof) glands contain chemical compounds that are known to have antimicrobial activity against soil and mammalian pathogens.

=== Movement ===
The pronghorn is the fastest land mammal in the Western Hemisphere, being built for maximum predator evasion through running. Their top speed is dependent upon the length of time over which it is measured. It can run 35 mph (56 km/h) for 4 mi (6.5 km), 42 mph (68 km/h) for 1 mi (1.5 km), and 55 mph (88.5 km/h) for 800 metres (0.5 mi). Although it is slower than the African cheetah, it can sustain top speeds much longer than cheetahs. Compared to its body size, the pronghorn has a large windpipe, heart, blood volume, erythrocites, and lungs to allow it to take in large amounts of air when running. Additionally, pronghorn hooves have two long, cushioned, pointed toes, which help absorb shock when running at high speeds. They also have an extremely light bone structure and hollow hair.

Male pronghorns tend to have a higher level of physical activity than females and apparently also have a greater blood volume relative to body size.

Pronghorns are built for speed, not for jumping. Since their ranges are sometimes affected by sheep ranchers' fences, they can be seen going under fences, sometimes at high speed. For this reason, the Arizona Antelope Foundation and others are in the process of removing the bottom barbed wire from the fences, and/or installing a barbless bottom wire.

The pronghorn has been observed to have at least 13 distinct gaits, including one reaching nearly 24 ft (7.3 m) per stride.

When a pronghorn sees something that alarms it, the white hair on the rump flares open and exposes two highly odoriferous glands that releases a compound described as having an odour "reminiscent of buttered popcorn." This sends a message to other pronghorns by both sight and smell about a present danger. This scent has been smelled by humans 65 to 100 feet downwind from alarmed animals. The major odor compound identified from this gland is 2-pyrrolidinone.

== Range and ecology ==
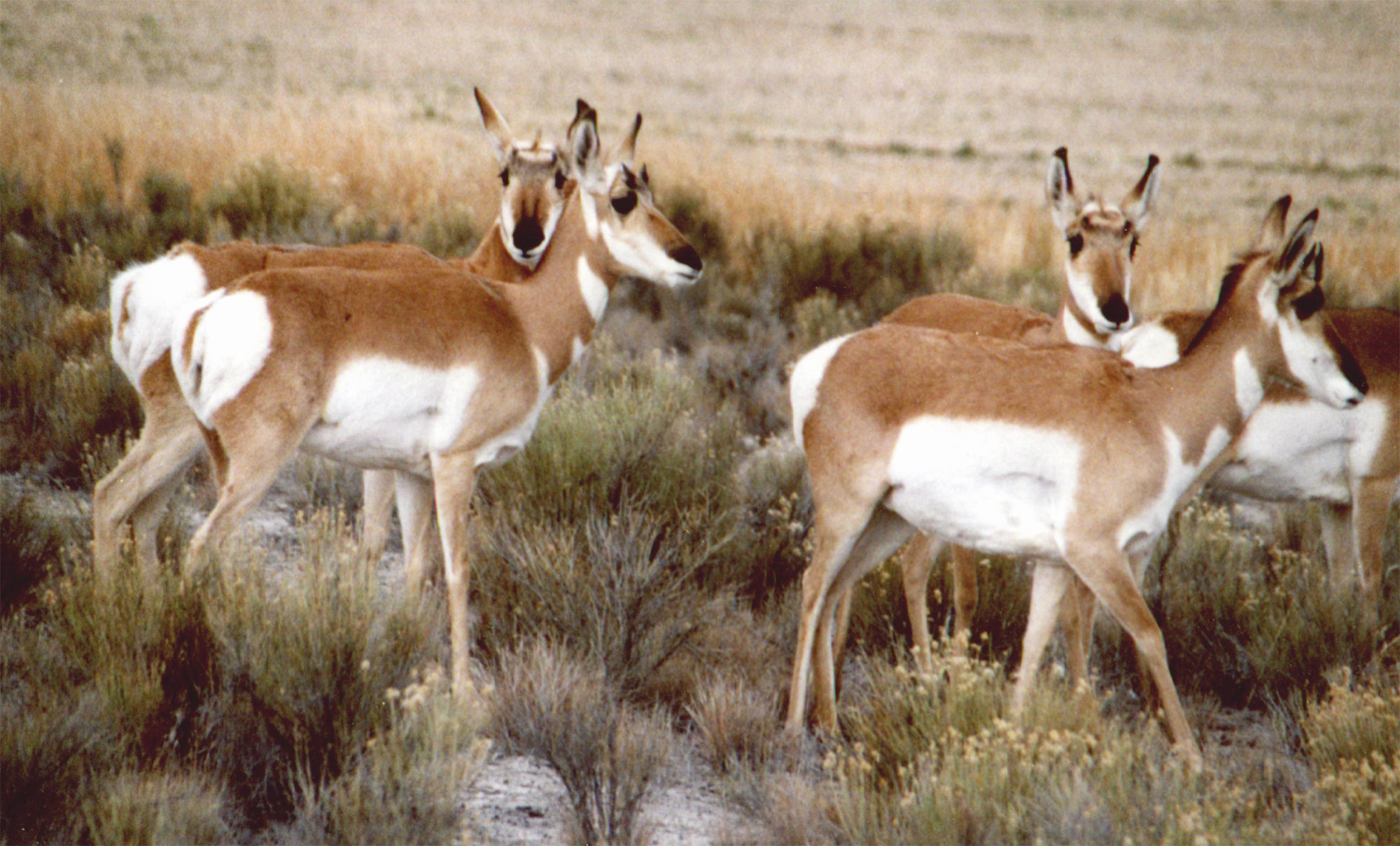
Pronghorns in Fort Rock, Oregon

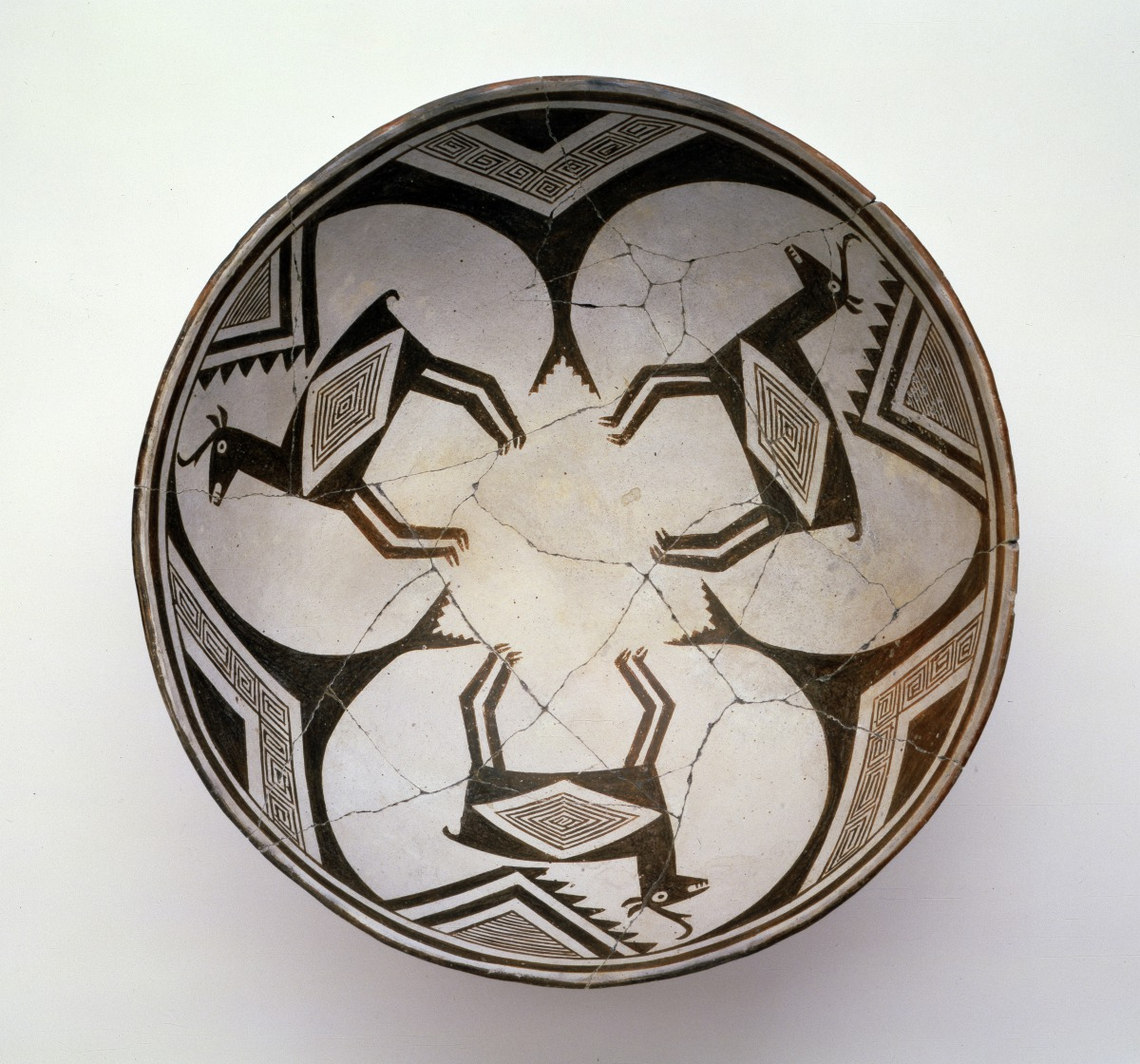
Mimbres bowl with three pronghorns, circa 1000–1150 AD, found in the Mimbres Valley of southwest New Mexico

Prior to the arrival of Europeans, the pronghorn was particularly abundant in the regions west of the Mississippi River which is still its primary range today. The amount of wildlife was considered to be so vast at one time that the prehistoric American Prairie—and as recently as 200 to 300 years ago—has been dubbed the "American Serengeti", due to the once-millions-strong herds of bison, elk, and pronghorn, as well as many other now-extinct megafauna.

The present-day range of the pronghorn is west of the Mississippi, extending from southern Saskatchewan and Alberta, Canada, south into the western United States, primarily in the states of Arizona, Colorado, Idaho, Kansas, Montana, Nebraska, Nevada, New Mexico, North Dakota, Oklahoma, Oregon, South Dakota, Texas, Utah, Washington, and Wyoming, and into Mexico. In extreme Northern California, pronghorns can be found in inland counties, ranging from neighboring Nevada and Oregon, as well as the central coastal grasslands, further south. In Mexico, the Sonoran pronghorn (A. a. sonoriensis) subspecies may be found from the state of Baja California Sur east through Sonora to San Luis Potosí, in north-central regions of the country, albeit in gradually diminishing populations. They have been extirpated from Iowa and Minnesota in the United States, and from Manitoba in Canada.

Other regional subspecies include the Rocky Mountain pronghorn (A. a. americana), Mexican pronghorn (A. a. mexicana), the Oregon pronghorn (A. a. oregona), and the critically endangered Baja California pronghorn (A. a. peninsularis).

Pronghorns prefer open terrain at elevations between 3,000 and 5,900 ft (910 and 1,800 m), with the densest populations in areas receiving around 10–16 in (254–406 1/2 mm) of rainfall per year. They eat a wide variety of plant foods, often including plants unpalatable or toxic to domestic livestock, though they also compete with them for food. In one study, forbs comprised 62% of their diet, shrubs 23%, and grasses 15%. Another study similarly found forbs comprised 20%, cacti 40%, shrubs 18%, and grass 22%. Pronghorns chew cud (ruminate).

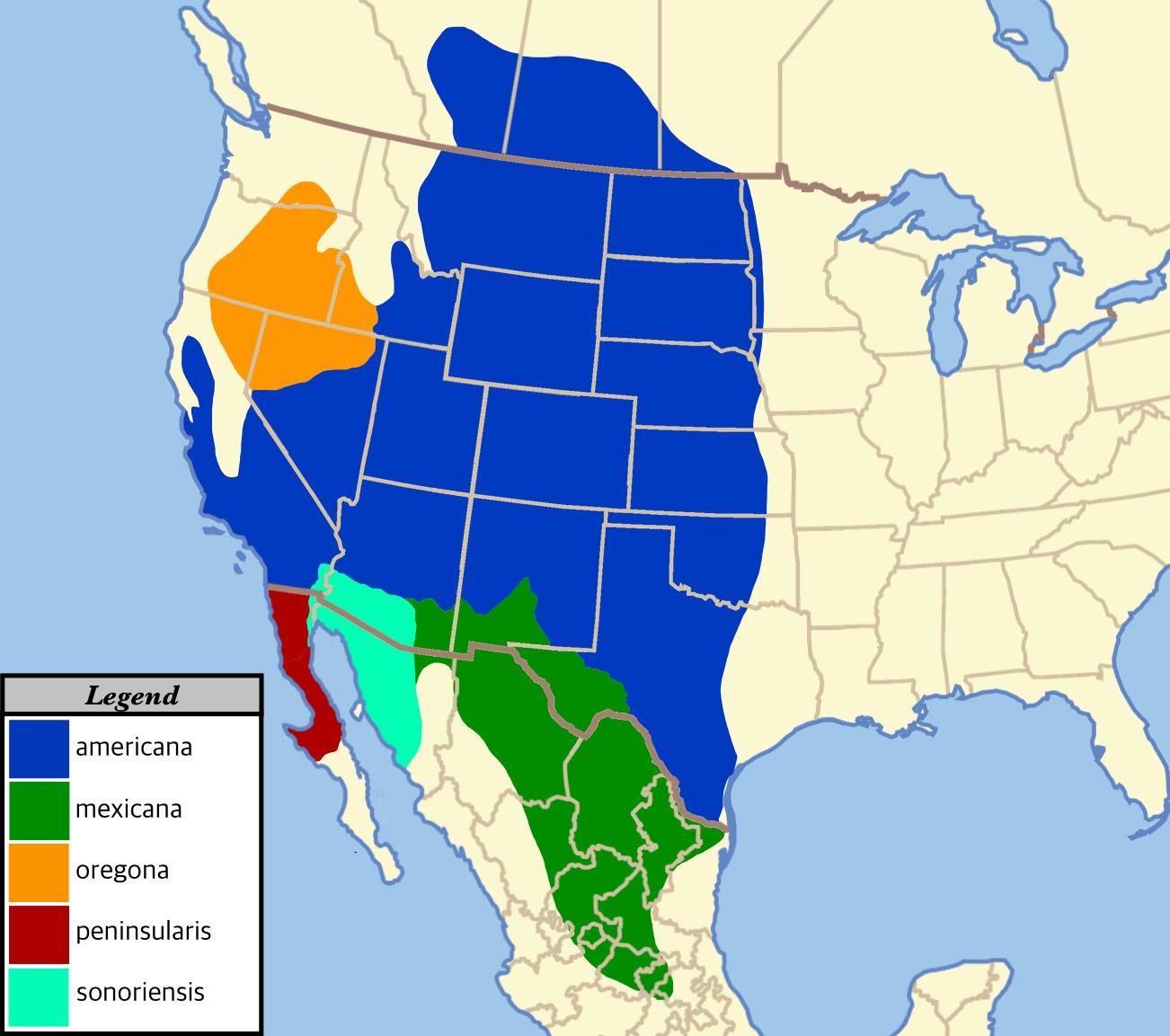
Historical range of pronghorn subspecies

Healthy pronghorn populations tend to stay within 3–4 mi (5.0–6.5 km) of a water source. The majority are found within 5 mi (8 km) of a water source.

An ongoing study by the Lava Lake Institute for Science and Conservation and the Wildlife Conservation Society shows an overland migration route that covers more than 160 mi (260 km). The migrating pronghorn start travel from the foothills of the Pioneer Mountains through Craters of the Moon National Monument to the Continental Divide. Dr. Scott Bergen of the Wildlife Conservation Society says "This study shows that pronghorns are the true marathoners of the American West. With these new findings, we can confirm that Idaho supports a major overland mammal migration—an increasingly rare phenomenon in the U.S. and worldwide."

Cougars (Puma concolor), wolves (Canis lupus), coyotes (Canis latrans), grizzly bears (Ursus arctos horribilis), and bobcats (Lynx rufus) are major predators of pronghorns. Golden eagles (Aquila chrysaetos) have been reported to prey on fawns and adults. Jaguars (Panthera onca) also likely prey on pronghorns in their native range in the southwestern United States and northern Mexico. In the Pleistocene, jaguars likely were dangerous to pronghorns as a short-range ambush predator. Miracinonyx also hunted the pronghorns during the Late Pleistocene. Isotopic analysis, however, indicated that it preyed not only on pronghorns, but also on larger herbivores such as the bighorn sheep, bison and horses like Equus and Haringtonhippus. The isotopic values of Miracinonyx overlapped with that of American lions and wolves which also preyed on pronghorns.

=== Disputed theory of evolutionary arms race ===
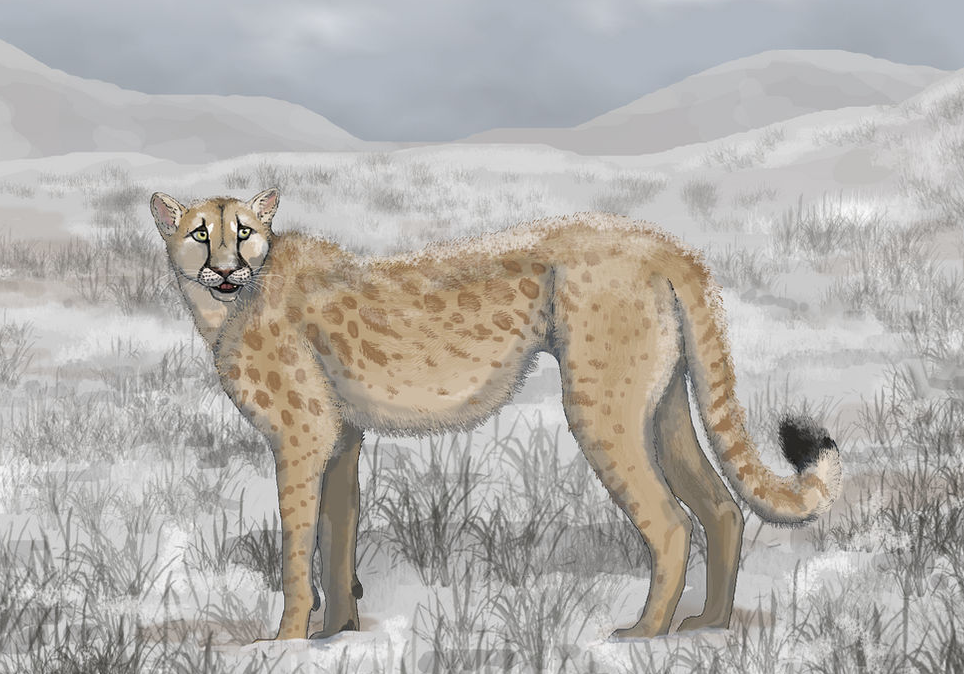
Hypothetical life restoration of M. trumani

In 1988, American paleontologist John Chorn and colleagues reported fossils of modern pronghorns from the Natural Trap Cave of Wyoming and argued that the pronghorns developed adaptations for high speeds to escape from the contemporary Miracinonyx trumani, whose fossils were the second most abundant among predators in the cave after those of wolves. The authors claimed that M. trumani and the modern cheetah filled the same ecological role and niche, preferably preying on relatively small, fast-running ungulates. Furthermore, they proposed that M. trumani and the pronghorns evolved cursoriality through an evolutionary arms race, a competition between two groups of organisms developing adaptations and counter-adaptations against each other over generations. In 1997, American biologist John A. Byers argued that pursuit predators, particularly the species of Miracinonyx, were the primary reason that caused the selection for cursorial adaptations in the species of Antilocapra, the genus that includes the modern pronghorn. This theory was depicted in the 2002 six-part BBC nature documentary Wild New World, which focused on the Pleistocene megafauna of North America.

However, American biologist Gina M. Semprebon and French paleontologist Florent Rivals disagreed with Byers' theory in 2007. The authors contended that the Antilocapridae, the family that includes the modern pronghorn, developed cursorial adaptations before the existence of pursuit predators in North America, and cautioned against attributing such adaptations to a particular selective pressure without sufficient evidence. In 2017, American paleontologist David Levering and colleagues claimed that North American ungulates diversified during the late Miocene epoch, as the expansion of open grasslands favored longer limbs for faster, more energy-efficient locomotion with longer strides, rather than primarily as an adaptation to escape predation. However, their morphospace analyses (graphical representations of variation in organism's morphology) showed that Miocene antilocaprids and contemporary North American camelids and equids already possessed cursorial limb adaptations before or during these vegetation changes, possibly indicating that open grassland expansion may not have driven these adaptations, or that open habitats existed before the Miocene grassland expansion.

To identify the factors that shaped the evolution of antilocaprids, Brazilian paleontologists João C. S. Nascimento and Mathias M. Pires compared the estimated diversification and extinction rates of the antilocaprids with those of other contemporary North American fauna and flora in 2025. The authors claimed that competition among herbivores driven by the rapid increase of open grasslands in the late Miocene, from 10 to 7 million years ago, likely led to the diversification of Antilocaprinae, the subfamily of Antilocapridae. They also suggested that the felids like Miracinonyx may have influenced both the antilocaprines' cursorial adaptations and decline in diversity, based on a correlation between felid diversification and antilocaprine extinction rates.

To observe whether cursorial adaptations developed gradually or early in antilocaprid evolution, American paleontologists Fabian C. Hardy and Anne E. Kort compared the ankle bone proportions of the modern pronghorns with those of the Miocene antilocaprids in 2026, under the assumption that the relatively short ankle bones were adaptations for high speeds in artiodactyls (even-toed ungulates) like pronghorns that live in open environments. The authors concluded that no significant difference in ankle bone proportions can be found between the modern pronghorns and their early relatives of the Miocene, suggesting that the antilocaprids developed cursorial adaptations prior to the first appearance of Miracinonyx and that their limbs were already adjusted to open habitats. Based on isotopic evidence and fossils of M. trumani from the Arctic environments of Yukon, American geneticist Molly Cassatt-Johnstone and colleagues proposed in the same year that the species was not exceptionally specialized like the modern cheetah for hunting cursorial prey such as pronghorns, but had a more flexible diet comparable to those of modern lions and cougars, both of which also have broad geographic ranges.

== Social behavior and reproduction ==
Pronghorns form mixed-sex herds in the winter. In early spring, the herds break up, with young males forming bachelor groups, females forming harems, and adult males living solitarily. Some female bands share the same summer range, and bachelor male bands form between spring and fall. Females form dominance hierarchies with few circular relationships. Dominant females aggressively displace other females from feeding sites.

Adult males either defend a fixed territory that females may enter, or defend a harem of females. A pronghorn may change mating strategies depending on environmental or demographic conditions. Where precipitation is high, adult males tend to be territorial and maintain their territories with scent marking, vocalizing, and challenging intruders. In these systems, territorial males have access to better resources than bachelor males. Females also employ different mating strategies. "Sampling" females visit several males and remain with each for a short time before switching to the next male at an increasing rate as estrus approaches. "Inciting" females behave as samplers until estrus, and then incite conflicts between males, watching and then mating with the winners. Before fighting, males try to intimidate each other. If intimidation fails, they lock horns and try to injure each other. "Quiet" females remain with a single male in an isolated area throughout estrus. Females continue this mating behavior for two to three weeks.

When courting a female in estrus, a male pronghorn approaches her while softly vocalizing and waving his head side to side, displaying his cheek patches. The scent glands on the pronghorn are on either side of the jaw, between the hooves, and on the rump. A receptive female remains motionless, sniffs his scent gland, and then allows the male to mount her.

Pronghorns have a gestation period of 7–8 months, which is longer than is typical for North American ungulates. They breed in mid-September, and the doe carries her fawn until late May. The gestation period is around six weeks longer than that of the white-tailed deer. Females usually bear within a few days of each other. Twin fawns are common. Newborn pronghorns weigh 4–9 lb (2–4 kg), most commonly 7 lb (3 kg). In their first 21–26 days, fawns spend time hiding in vegetation. Fawns interact with their mothers for 20–25 minutes a day; this continues even when the fawn joins a nursery. The females nurse, groom, and lead their young to food and water, as well as keep predators away from them. Females usually nurse the young about three times a day. Males are weaned 2–3 weeks earlier than females. Sexual maturity is reached at 15 to 16 months, though males rarely breed until three years old. Their lifespan is typically up to 10 years, rarely 15 years.

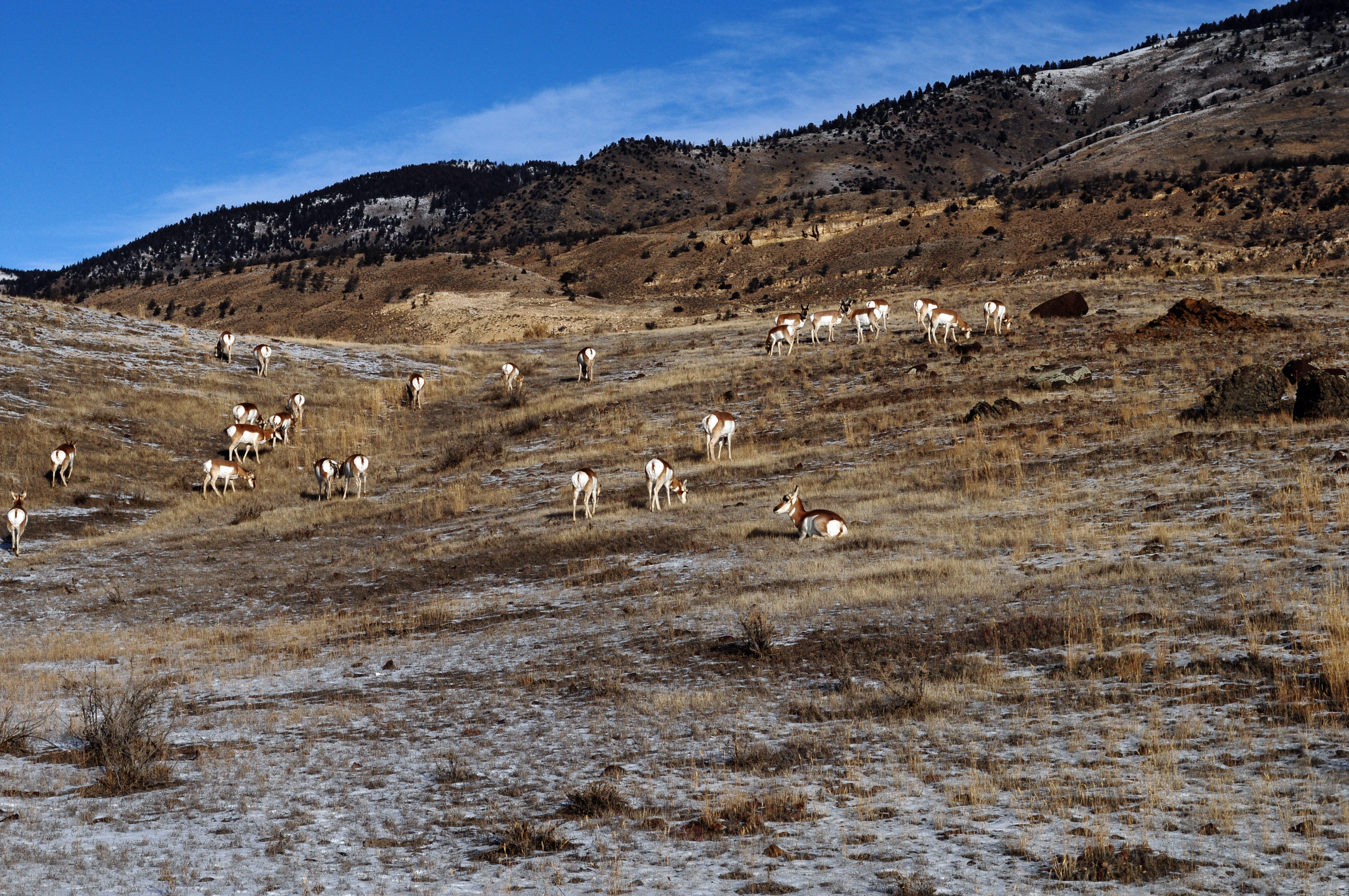
Pronghorn herd, Yellowstone National Park

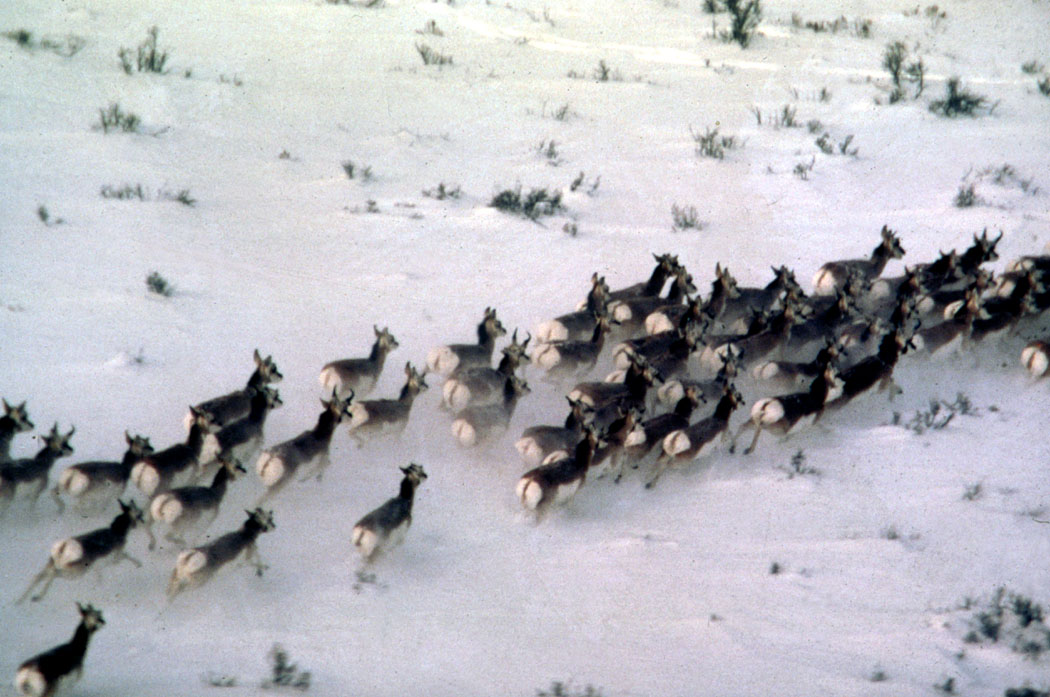
Herd of pronghorns

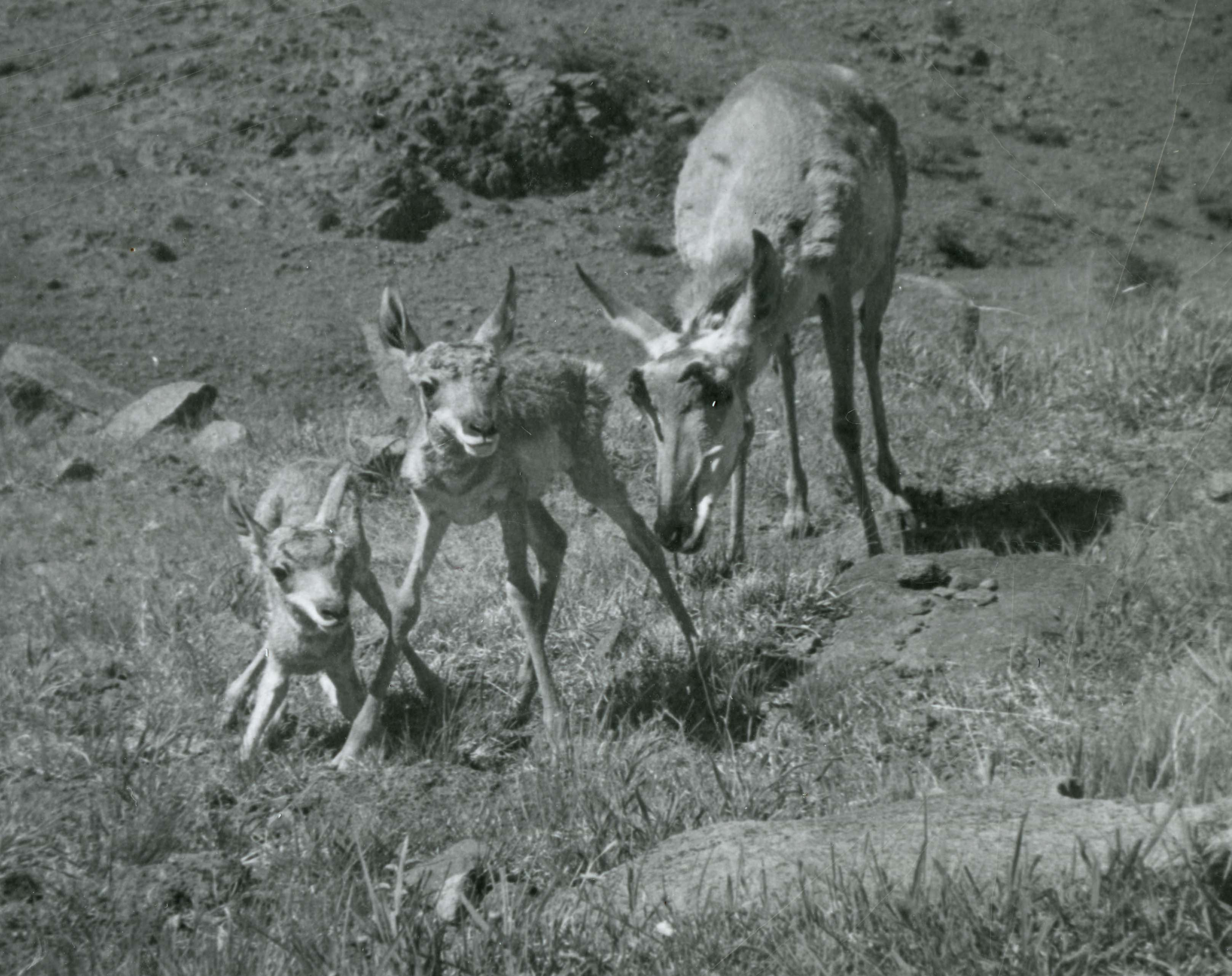
Doe with fawns about an hour old, near Fort Davis, Texas, 1947. Photo by Smithsonian zoologist Helmut Buechner

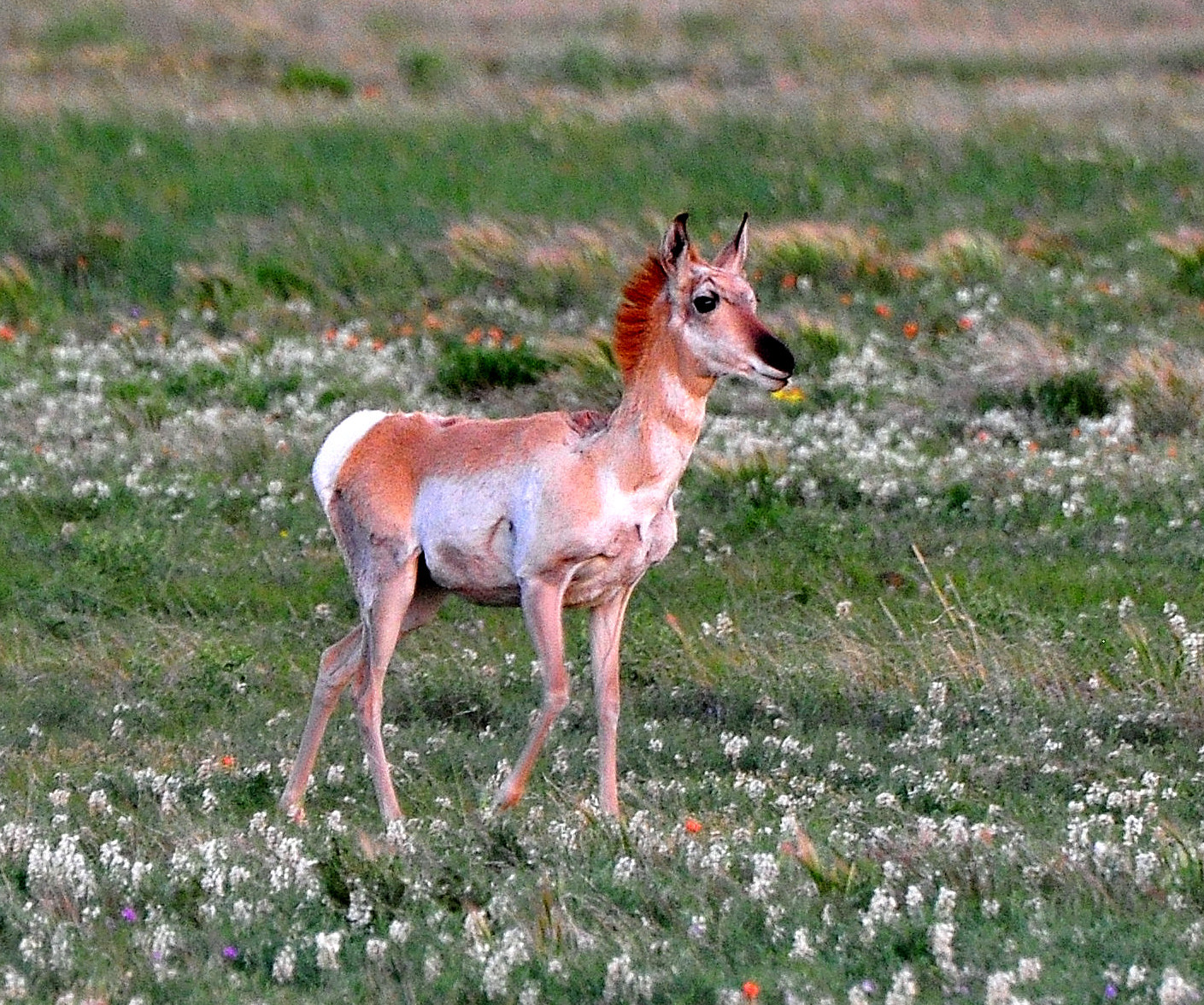
Juvenile fawn in New Mexico

== Relationship with humans ==
In regions inhabited by the Plains Indians tribes, as well as in the Northwest Plateau, pronghorn were hunted as a principal food source by local people. The pronghorn has also featured prominently in Native American mythology and oral history.

Merriwether Lewis and William Clark made several other observations on the behavior of pronghorns and how the local tribes hunted them. They described the animal, which they referred to as the "Antelope" or the "Goat", as follows:

Of all the animals we have seen the Antelope seems to possess the most wonderful fleetness. Shy and timorous they generally repose only on the ridges, which command a view of all the approaches of an enemy ... When they first see the hunters they run with great velocity ... The Indians near the Rocky Mountains hunt these animals on horseback, and shoot them with arrows. The Mandans' mode of hunting them is to form a large, strong pen or fold, from which a fence made of bushes gradually widens on each side. The animals are surrounded by the hunters, and gently driven towards this pen, in which they imperceptibly find themselves enclosed, and are then at the mercy of the hunters.

== Population and conservation ==
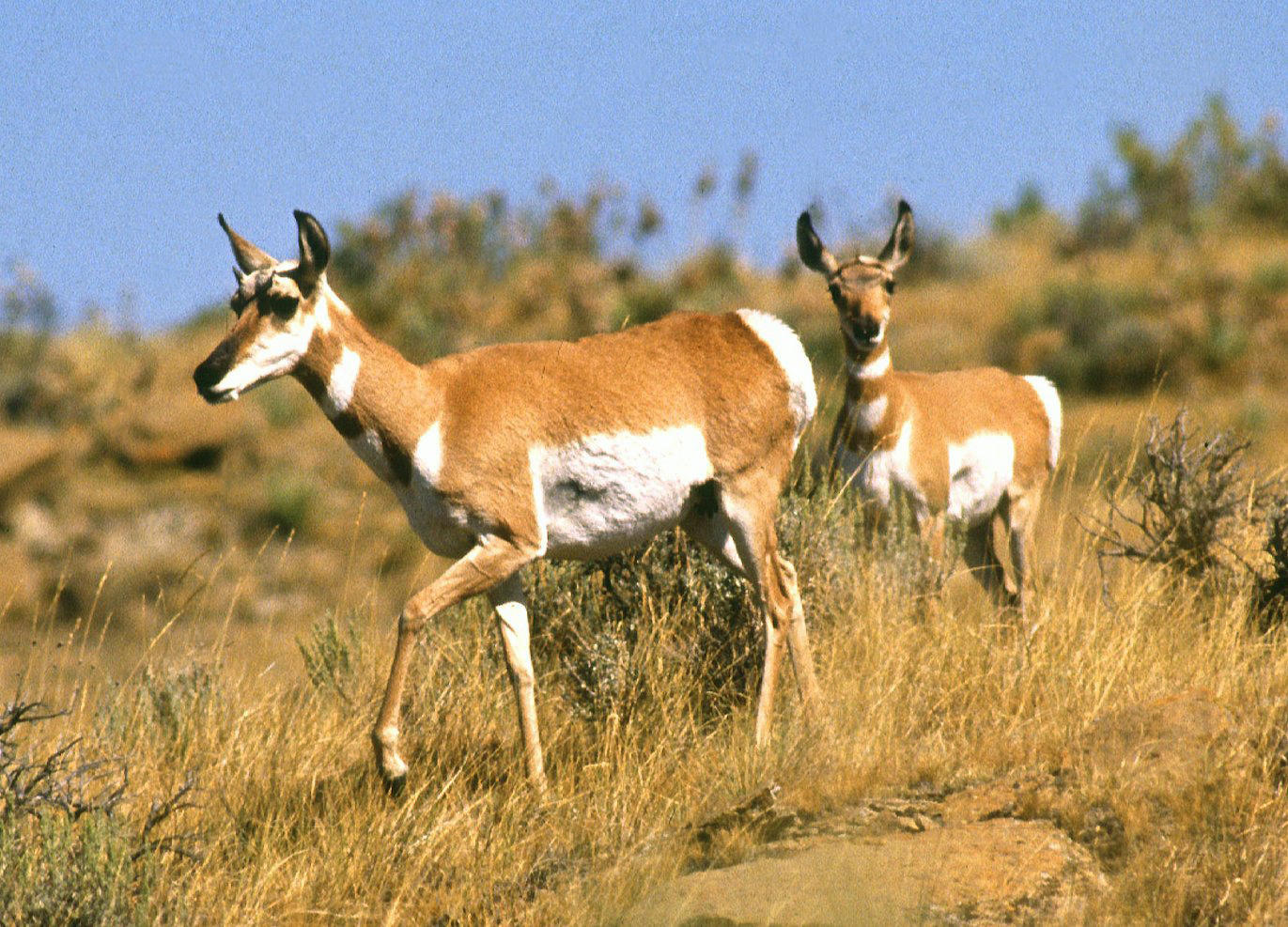
Pronghorns in Montana

At the turn of the 20th century, members of the wildlife conservation group Boone and Crockett Club had determined that the extinction of the pronghorn was likely. In a letter from George Bird Grinnell, Boone and Crockett Club chairman of the game preservation committee, to Walter L. Fisher, Secretary of the Interior, Grinnell stated, "The Club is much concerned about the fate of the pronghorn which appears to be everywhere rapidly diminishing." By the 1920s, hunting pressure had reduced the pronghorn population to about 13,000. Boone and Crockett Club member Charles Alexander Sheldon, in a letter to fellow member Grinnell, wrote, "Personally, I think that the antelope are doomed, yet every attempt should be made to save them." Although the club had begun their efforts to save the pronghorn in 1910 by funding and restocking the Wichita Game Refuge in Oklahoma, the National Bison Range in Montana, and the Wind Cave National Park, in South Dakota, most of the efforts were doomed since experience demonstrated that after initial increases the pronghorns would die off because of the fenced enclosures.

In 1927, Grinnell spearheaded efforts along with the help of T. Gilbert Pearson of Grinnell's National Audubon Society to create the Charles Alexander Sheldon Antelope Refuge in northern Nevada. About 2900 acres of land were jointly purchased by the two organizations and subsequently turned over to the Biological Survey as a pronghorn refuge. This donation was contingent upon the government's adding 30,000 acres of surrounding public lands. On June 20, 1929, United States President Herbert Hoover included the required public lands upon request of the Department of Agriculture and the Department of the Interior after learning that the Boone and Crockett Club and the National Audubon Society were underwriting the private land buyout. On January 26, 1931, Hoover signed the executive order for the refuge. On December 31, 1936, President Franklin Roosevelt signed an executive order creating a 222,000-hectare (549,000-acre) tract; this was the true beginning for pronghorn recovery in North America.

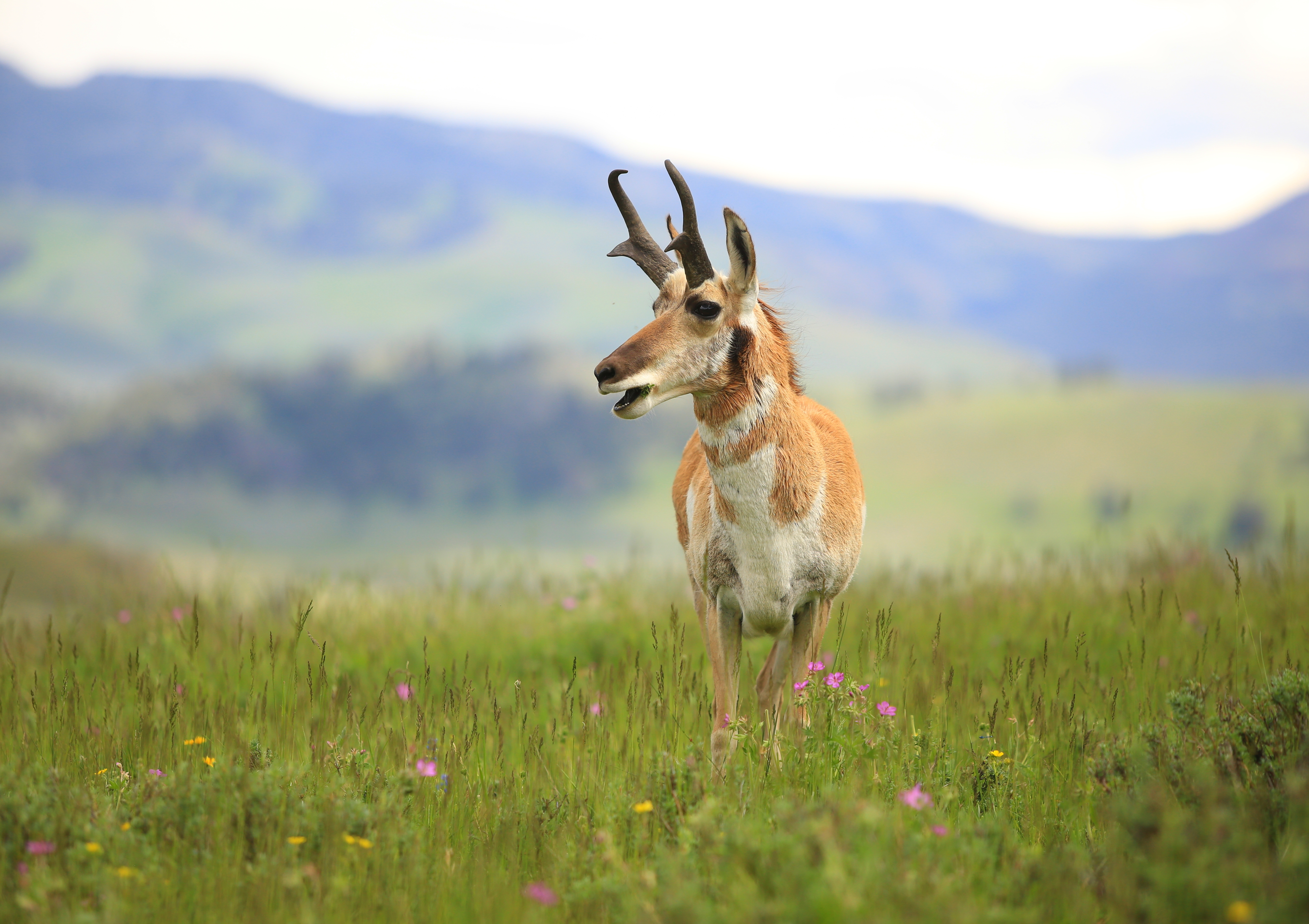
Male adult pronghorn in Yellowstone National Park

The protection of habitat and hunting restrictions have allowed pronghorn numbers to recover to an estimated population between 500,000 and 1,000,000 since the 1930s. Some recent decline has occurred in a few localized populations, due to bluetongue disease which is spread from sheep, but the overall trend has been positive.

Pronghorn migration corridors are threatened by habitat fragmentation and the blocking of traditional routes. In a migration study conducted by Lava Lake Institute for Science and Conservation and the Wildlife Conservation Society, at one point, the migration corridor bottlenecks to an area only 200 yards wide.

Pronghorns are now quite numerous, and outnumbered people in Wyoming and parts of northern Colorado until just recently. They are legally hunted in western states for purposes of population control and food. No major range-wide threats exist, although localized declines are taking place, particularly to the Sonoran pronghorn, mainly as a result of livestock grazing, the construction of roads, fences, and other barriers that prevent access to historical habitat, illegal hunting, insufficient forage and water, and lack of recruitment.

Three subspecies are considered endangered in all (A. a. sonoriensis, A. a. peninsularis), or part of their ranges (A. a. mexicana). The Sonoran pronghorn has an estimated population of fewer than 300 in the United States and 200–500 in Mexico, while there are approximately 200 Peninsula pronghorn in Baja California. Populations of the Sonoran pronghorn in Arizona and Mexico are protected under the Endangered Species Act (since 1967), and a recovery plan for this subspecies has been prepared by U.S. Fish and Wildlife Service. Mexican animals are listed on CITES Appendix I. Pronghorns have game-animal status in all of the western states of the United States, and permits are required to trap or hunt pronghorns.
