= Ionica =

Ionica may refer to:

== People ==
- Ionică, a Romanian version of John (given name)
- Viorica Ionică (born 1955), a Romanian handballer
- Ionică Minune (born 1959), a Romani-Romanian accordionist
- Ionica Munteanu (born 1979), a Romanian female handballer
- Ionica Smeets (born 1979), a Dutch mathematician and science journalist
- Ionică Tăutu (1798–1828), a Moldavian boyar

== Other uses ==
- Ionica (company), a former British telecoms provider
- Ionica, a poem by Panyassis, 5th century BC
- Ionica, a poetry anthology by William Johnson Cory, 1858

== See also ==
- Ionic (disambiguation)
- Adriatica Ionica Race, an Italian annual cycle race
