= Newcastle, Nebraska =

Village in Dixon County, Nebraska, United States

- Village
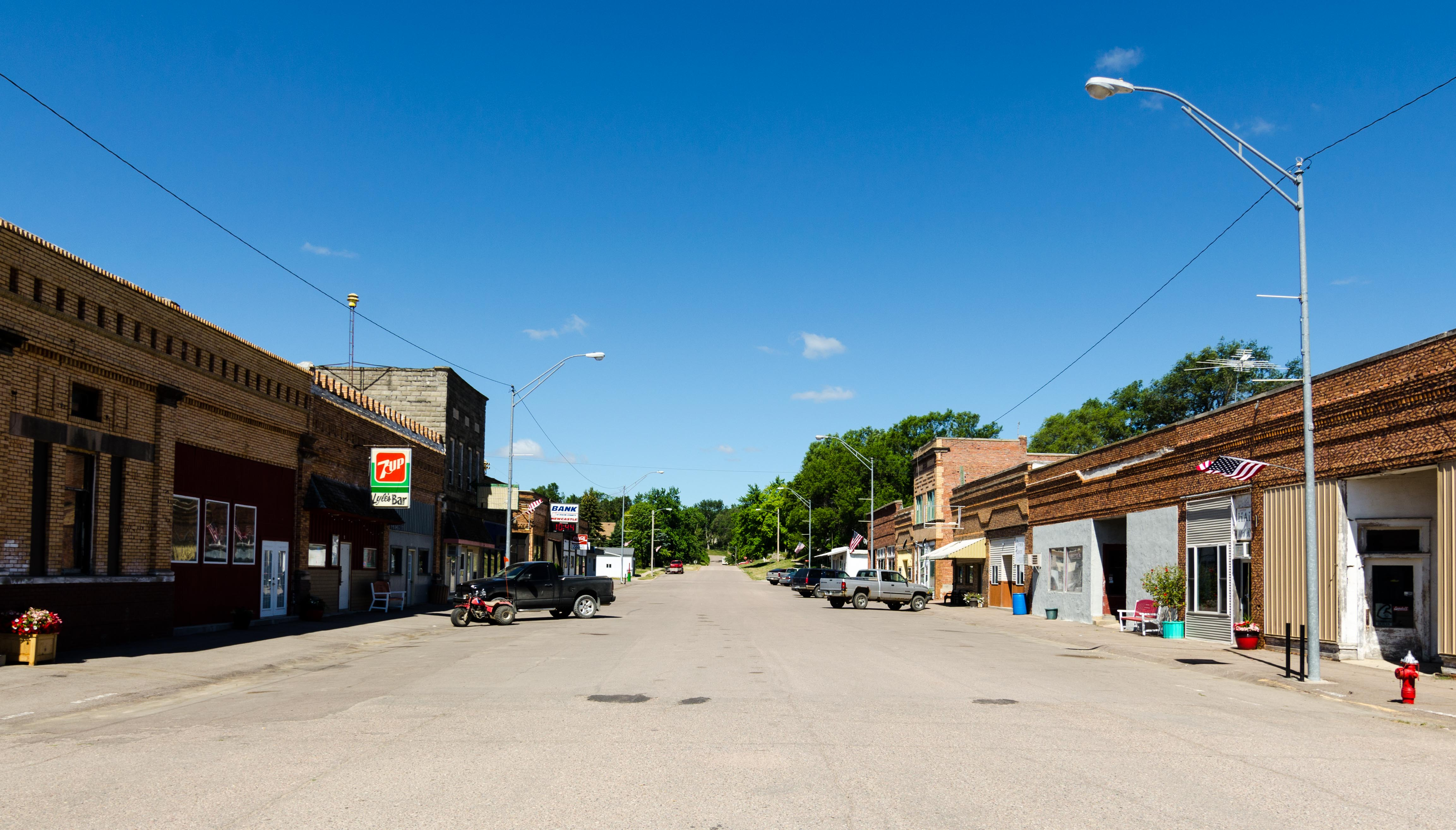
- Main Street in Newcastle, June 2017

- Location of Newcastle, Nebraska
- Coordinates: 42.6513012657348°N 96.87353812441586°W
- Country: United States
- State: Nebraska
- County: Dixon

Area
  - Total: 0.34 sq mi (0.88 km^{2})
  - Land: 0.34 sq mi (0.88 km^{2})
  - Water: 0 sq mi (0.00 km^{2})
- Elevation: 1,289 ft (393 m)

Population (2020)
  - Total: 272
  - Density: 804.2/sq mi (310.49/km^{2})
- Time zone: UTC-6 (Central (CST))
  - Summer (DST): UTC-5 (CDT)
- ZIP code: 68757
- Area code: 402
- FIPS code: 31-34090
- GNIS feature ID: 2399491

Newcastle is a village in Dixon County, Nebraska, United States. It is part of the Sioux City, IA–NE–SD Metropolitan Statistical Area. As of the 2020 census, Newcastle had a population of 272.

== History ==
Newcastle was incorporated as a village in 1893, soon after the Chicago, St. Paul, Minneapolis and Omaha Railway was extended to that point. According to one tradition, it was named from a pioneer settler's house that was known locally as the "new castle".

Newcastle hosts a unique Labor Day celebration every year that garners many attendees. Activities include an afternoon parade, fire hose water fights and an old fashioned wheat threshing exhibit.

The township has long had a close history with the abandoned riverfront town Ionia. It is listed on the Nebraska Historical markers due to close campsites of Lewis & Clark and reference to the Ionia volcano. The Ionia volcano is mentioned both by the explorers within their memoirs and local residents within the late nineteenth century county history publication “Dixon County History” published 1982.

== Geography ==
According to the United States Census Bureau, the village has a total area of 0.34 square miles (0.88 km^{2}), all land.

Located near Newcastle is the Ionia Volcano, a mineral deposit that once sat in cliffs on the edge of the Missouri River. Water from the river would leak through fissures in the cliff and cause steam to rise. Much of the so-called volcano washed into the river in the 1870s, and today the site is more than a mile from the river.

== Demographics ==
Historical population
Census	Pop.	Note	%±
1900	331		—
1910	436		31.7%
1920	500		14.7%
1930	446		−10.8%
1940	447		0.2%
1950	426		−4.7%
1960	357		−16.2%
1970	347		−2.8%
1980	348		0.3%
1990	271		−22.1%
2000	299		10.3%
2010	325		8.7%
2020	272		−16.3%
U.S. Decennial Census

=== 2010 census ===
As of the census of 2010, there were 325 people, 139 households, and 84 families residing in the village. The population density was 955.9 inhabitants per square mile (369.1/km^{2}). There were 159 housing units at an average density of 467.6 per square mile (180.5/km^{2}). The racial makeup of the village was 99.7% White and 0.3% African American. Hispanic or Latino of any race were 2.8% of the population.

There were 139 households, of which 30.2% had children under the age of 18 living with them, 49.6% were married couples living together, 8.6% had a female householder with no husband present, 2.2% had a male householder with no wife present, and 39.6% were non-families. 34.5% of all households were made up of individuals, and 20.1% had someone living alone who was 65 years of age or older. The average household size was 2.34 and the average family size was 3.11.

The median age in the village was 39.9 years. 27.1% of residents were under the age of 18; 5.6% were between the ages of 18 and 24; 23% were from 25 to 44; 26.2% were from 45 to 64; and 18.2% were 65 years of age or older. The gender makeup of the village was 48.0% male and 52.0% female.

=== 2000 census ===
As of the census of 2000, there were 299 people, 134 households, and 69 families residing in the village. The population density was 892.5 inhabitants per square mile (344.6/km^{2}). There were 153 housing units at an average density of 456.7 per square mile (176.3/km^{2}). The racial makeup of the village was 100.00% White. Hispanic or Latino of any race were 0.67% of the population.

There were 134 households, out of which 25.4% had children under the age of 18 living with them, 47.0% were married couples living together, 3.7% had a female householder with no husband present, and 48.5% were non-families. 47.0% of all households were made up of individuals, and 29.1% had someone living alone who was 65 years of age or older. The average household size was 2.23 and the average family size was 3.33.

In the village, the population was spread out, with 26.4% under the age of 18, 5.0% from 18 to 24, 24.1% from 25 to 44, 21.1% from 45 to 64, and 23.4% who were 65 years of age or older. The median age was 40 years. For every 100 females, there were 92.9 males. For every 100 females age 18 and over, there were 83.3 males.

As of 2000 the median income for a household in the village was $29,000, and the median income for a family was $45,750. Males had a median income of $27,125 versus $16,625 for females. The per capita income for the village was $13,845. About 7.7% of families and 8.3% of the population were below the poverty line, including 11.8% of those under the age of eighteen and 15.4% of those 65 or over.

== See also ==
- List of municipalities in Nebraska
