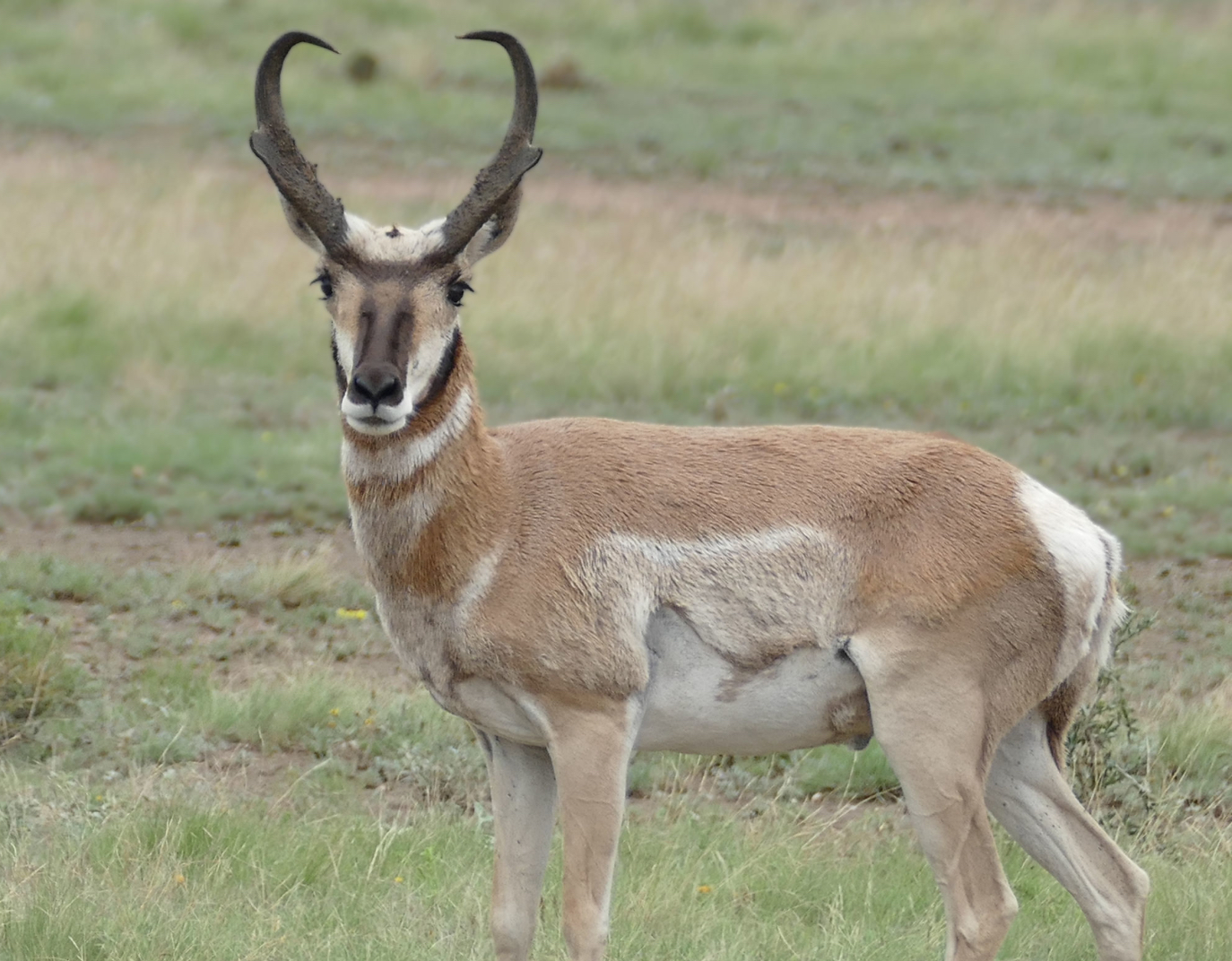
- Male in Brewster County, Texas

Conservation status
- Apparently Secure (NatureServe)

Scientific classification
- Kingdom: Animalia
- Phylum: Chordata
- Class: Mammalia
- Order: Artiodactyla
- Family: Antilocapridae
- Genus: Antilocapra
- Species: A. americana
- Subspecies: A. a. mexicana

Trinomial name
- Antilocapra americana mexicana Merriam, 1901

= Mexican pronghorn =

Subspecies of mammal

The Mexican pronghorn (Antilocapra americana mexicana) is a pronghorn subspecies which inhabits in Mexico and the United States. It was historically found from Hidalgo and the State of Mexico to the Southwestern United States and Western Texas, but has been reduced from most of its previous range. This subspecies is endangered and is threatened by illegal hunting, overgazing, and habitat loss.

== Terminology ==
Pedro de Castañeda was one of the earliest Europeans to encounter the pronghorn and the first to describe the animal. He found the artiodactyl in Chichilticale, southeastern Arizona, and referred to the animals as cabras montesas (mountain goats).

The modern term in Mexico, berrendo, originates from a loan word derived from a Celtic language. This word refers to a spotted fur colour of ruminants.

== Taxonomy ==
The Mexican pronghorn is the second of five pronghorn subspecies to be described and was named by Clinton Hart Merriam in 1901.

=== Evolution ===
The ancestors of the antilocaprids diverged from the ancestors of the giraffids in the Early Miocene; the okapi and the giraffe are the closest living relatives of the Mexican pronghorn apart from other pronghorns. The sister genus of Antilocapra is the extinct genus Texoceros, with which they form the tribe Antilocaprini. Texoceros first occurs in the late Hemphillian and disappears by the Blancan age. The modern pronghorn first appears in the Early Pleistocene. Due to the occurrence of Texoceros and the related antilocaprid Subantilocapra garciae in central Mexico, it is speculated that early evolution of the modern pronghorn took place there.

The earliest potential pronghorn fossils in Mexico come from the Tehuacán Valley and date from the Late Pleistocene. It is unclear if these are referrable to the modern pronghorn or an extinct form, though the author of the fossil's description suggests they are more likely belong to the modern pronghorn. The first remains of pronghorn in Mexico date in between the Late Pleistocene and Holocene and were located in Jimenez Cave, Chihuahua.

== Range ==
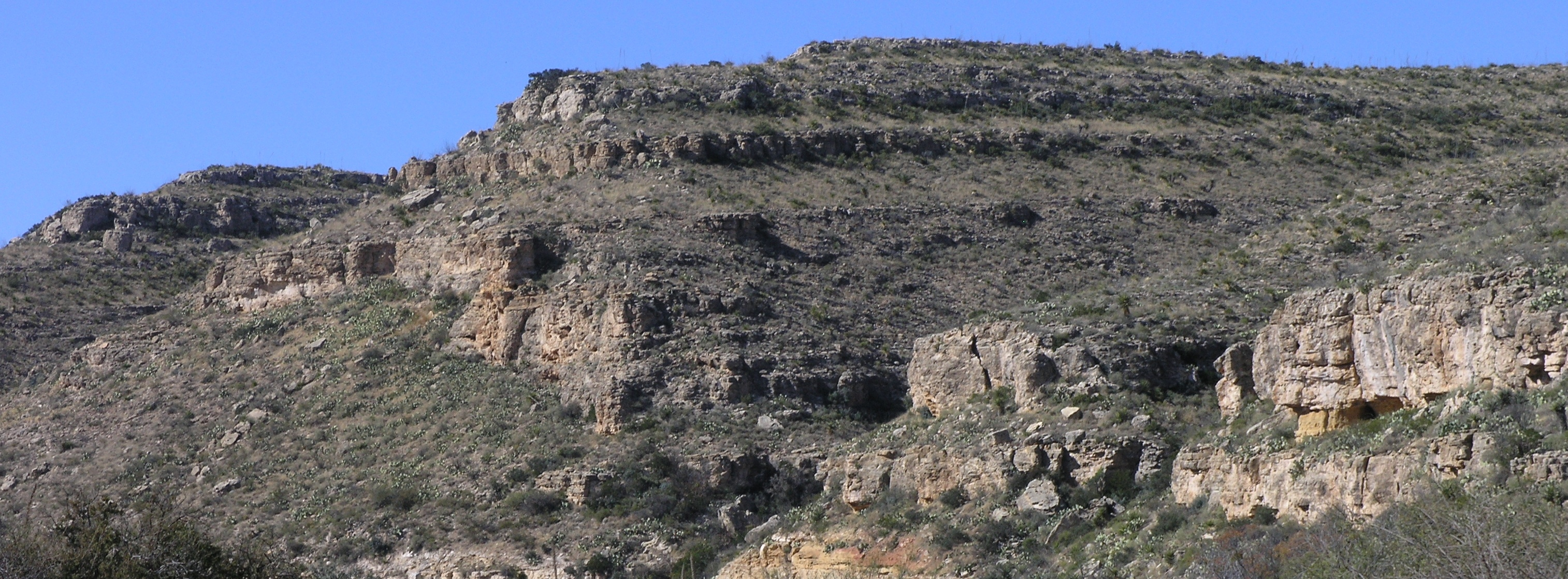
The Mexican pronghorn is mostly found in the Chihuahuan Desert

In the United States, this subspecies has small populations in New Mexico and Texas (Brewster County), and historically ranged into southeastern Arizona. The Mexican pronghorn is one of three subspecies of pronghorn native to Mexico. Within Mexico, Mexican pronghorn are found to the east of northeastern Sonora and range throughout the rest of the species range in the country. Southwards, Mexican pronghorns were found in eastern Hidalgo and northern State of Mexico.

Mexican pronghorns are typically found in desert grasslands. Most of their habitat has been decreased to the Chihuahuan Desert of northern Mexico.

== Reintroduction ==
With the Mexican pronghorn being an endangered species due to habitat destruction, overgrazing, poaching, and fencing of ranches, efforts have been made to reintroduce them into Mexico. Human intervention may be necessary, such as growing seedlings and transplants of the flora the animals survive on. In Coahuila, it was determined the animals browse mainly on forbs. Further things that can be done to help the reintroduction of this subspecies include setting up clean, reliable water stations (which serve to benefit all area wildlife), reducing the amount of grazing by livestock, and minimizing fence use. Temporary bans on hunting/killing pronghorn will be necessary, until populations stabilize sufficiently.

== Conservation ==
After reintroduction of the Mexican pronghorn, the next step is to start the conservation process. Historically, poaching was one of the factors that led them to become endangered. Only when the population is self-sustaining and thriving, can establishment of a hunting season (by permit) be considered for practical conservation. Unfortunately pronghorn numbers aren't anywhere near, for example, those of white-tailed deer or mule deer, so this concept is still rather in its infancy. Once sustainable herds are re-established, management plans can be implemented by the states where the animals are found. This allows a "survival-of-the-fittest" approach to aid in the population's genetic variability, as well as money going to the state. Other ways are contributing money and service to conservation organizations like the National Wildlife Federation.
