= Oregon pronghorn =

Scientific classification
- Kingdom: Animalia
- Phylum: Chordata
- Class: Mammalia
- Order: Artiodactyla
- Family: Antilocapridae
- Genus: Antilocapra
- Species: A. americana
- Subspecies: A. a. oregona

Trinomial name
- Antilocapra americana oregona V. Bailey, 1932

Subspecies of mammal

The Oregon pronghorn (Antilocapra americana oregona) is a historically described subspecies of the American pronghorn. The subspecies was first described by Vernon Bailey in 1932 based on a specimen collected on Hart Mountain in Oregon. It is described as being the same size or slightly larger than Antilocapra americana, with relatively larger feet and horns. Its skull is described as having slightly larger and more rounded audital bullae. However, later mitochondrial DNA and allozyme analyses were unable to distinguish the Oregon pronghorn from the American pronghorn.
