= Ioniko =

Ioniko (Greek: Ιονικό) may refer to places in Greece:

- Ioniko, Ilia
- Ioniko, Xanthi

== See also ==
- Ionikos (disambiguation)
