= Ion (disambiguation) =

In physics and chemistry, an ion is an atom or molecule with a net electric charge.

Ion or ION may also refer to:

== Places ==
- Ion, a hamlet near to Lower Gravenhurst, Bedfordshire, England
- Ion District, a technology park in Houston, Texas
- Ion (Greece), a town of ancient Laconia, Greece
- Ion, Iowa, an unincorporated community in the United States
- I'On, Mount Pleasant, South Carolina, a neighborhood
- ION Orchard, a shopping mall in Singapore
- Ion River, Romania

== People ==
- Ion (name), both a given name and a surname

== Ancient Greece ==
- Ion (dialogue), a dialogue by Plato, between Socrates and Ion, a reciter of epic poems
- Ion (mythology), the son of Xuthus and Creüsa, daughter of Erechtheus
- Ion (play), a play by Euripides on the relationship between humans and the gods, in which Ion is instead the son of Apollo

== Arts and entertainment ==
- I.O.N. (manga), a Japanese science fiction manga by Arina Tanemura
- Ion (DC Comics), a fictional character in the DC Comics universe
- Ion (Marvel Comics), a super villain in the Marvel Comics universe
- Fon Master Ion, from the video game Tales of the Abyss
- Ion Television, an American television network
- Ion, a fictional religious figure in the SCP Foundation universe based on Yaldabaoth
- Ion (Talfourd play), an 1836 play by Thomas Talfourd
- "(-) Ions", a song by Tool from Ænima

== Computing and technology ==
- Ion (window manager), in computing a window manager for the X Window System
- Nvidia Ion, an Nvidia platform for the Intel Atom CPU
- Ion, a defunct communication network formerly advertised by Sprint Nextel
- ION (satellite) (Illinois Observing Nanosatellite), a satellite from the University of Illinois
- Alesis Ion, an analog-modeling synthesizer keyboard made by Alesis
- Ion (serialization format), a data serialization language developed by Amazon
- Index to Organism Names (ION), a database of published names in zoology, indexing the content of The Zoological Record
- Ion, a command line shell for Redox operating system

== Transport ==
- Peugeot iOn, a rebadged Mitsubishi i-MiEV sold in Europe
- Saturn Ion, an automobile formerly sold by General Motors
- Ion rapid transit, a light rail system currently operating in Waterloo Region, Ontario, Canada
- ION, IATA code for Impfondo Airport, Republic of the Congo
- U.S. Route 95 in Oregon, designated I.O.N. Highway No. 456

== Other uses ==
- Ion (chocolate), a Greek chocolate brand
- Ion (paintball marker), made by Smart Parts
- Ion, a taxonomic synonym for the genus of violets, Viola
- Institute of Navigation
- Instituto Oncologico Nacional, Panama City

== See also ==
- Aion (disambiguation)
- Ionic (disambiguation)
