= SS Ionic =

Ionic was the name of two ships of the White Star Line:

- SS Ionic (1883), in service until 1900
- SS Ionic (1902)
