= Ionikos =

Ionikos may refer to the following Greek sports clubs:

- Ionikos Nikaias, a sports club in Nikaia
  - Ionikos F.C., or Ionikos Nikaias, a football club
  - Ionikos Nikaias B.C., a basketball team
- Ionikos Nea Filadelfeia, a sports club in Nea Filadelfeia
  - Ionikos N.F. B.C., a basketball team
- Ionikos Lamias B.C., a basketball club in Lamia

== See also ==
- Ioniko (disambiguation)
