= Ionia, New York =

There are two hamlets that can be referred to as Ionia, New York.

- A hamlet in West Bloomfield, Ontario County.
- A hamlet in Van Buren, Onondaga County.
