= Ionia, Nebraska =

Coordinates: 42.66833°N 96.78087°W

Ionia is a ghost town in Dixon County, Nebraska, United States.

== History ==
A post office was established at Ionia in 1860, and remained in operation until it was discontinued in 1900.

Ionia was located on the Missouri River but erosion and flooding led to Ionia's demise.

There also existed a "volcano" at the site.
