= Ionian school =

Ionian school or Heptanese school may refer to:

In ancient Ionia (Greek Ιωνία)

- Ionian school (philosophy), school of thought

In modern Ionian Islands (Greek Ιόνια νησιά)

- Ionian school (painting) or Heptanese school, art movement from the 17th to 19th centuries
- Ionian school (literature) or Heptanese school, art movement from the 18th and 19th centuries
- Ionian school (music) or Heptanese school, art movement from the 19th and 20th centuries

== See also ==
- Ionian Academy
- Ionian University
