= Ionia Volcano =

Geological formation in Nebraska

- Burnt Bluff, Volcano Hill
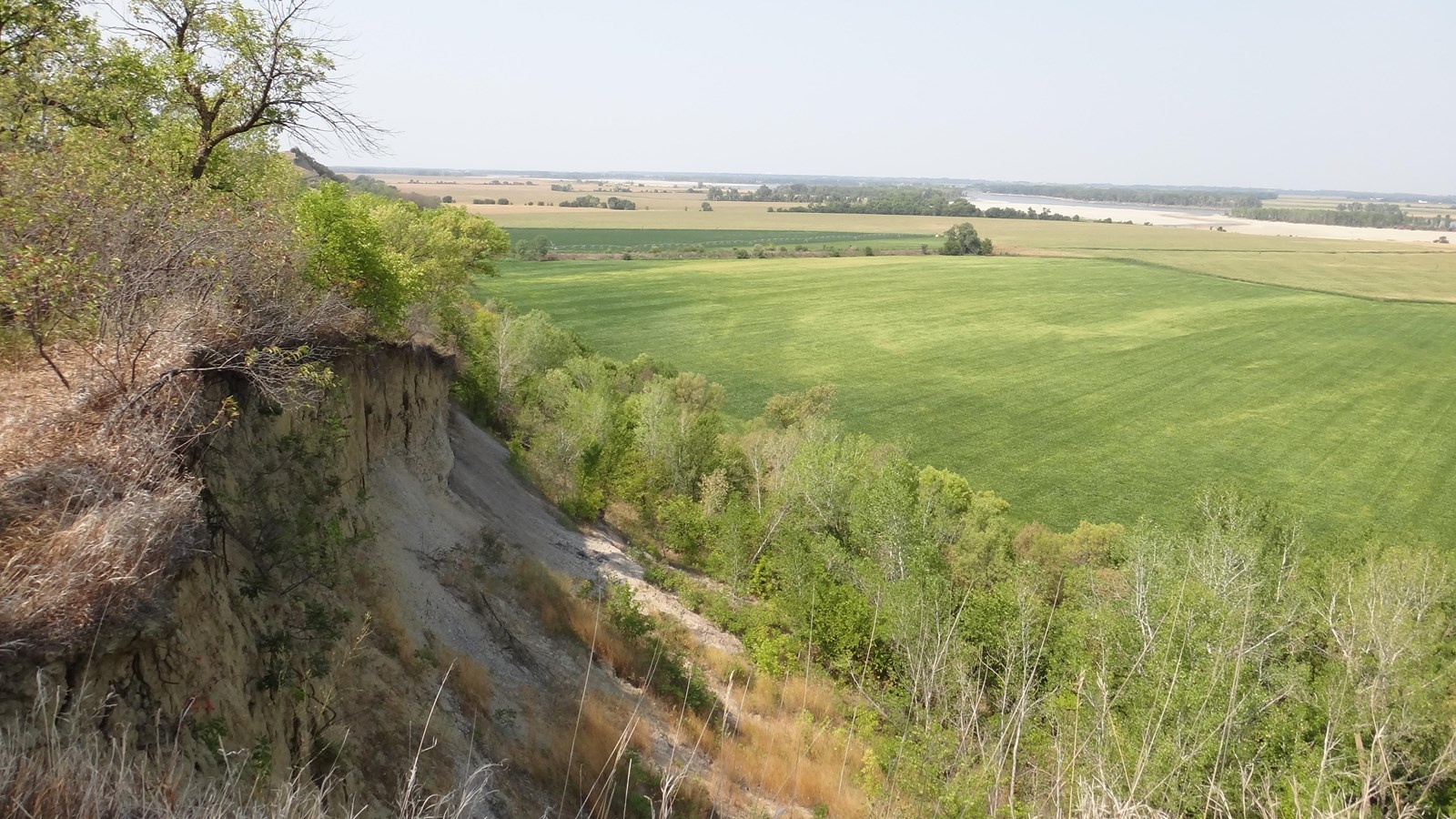
- Remains of the Ionia Volcano

Highest point
- Elevation: 180 to 190 ft (55 to 58 m)
- Coordinates: 42°41′26″N 96°49′50″W

Geography
- Location within Nebraska
- Location: Newcastle, Nebraska

Geology
- Last eruption: 1901

The Ionia Volcano (also referred to as Burnt Bluff or Volcano Hill) is a heat-producing bluff located east of Newcastle, Nebraska, although it has commonly been mistaken for an active volcano. The site was considered sacred by the Ponca and Arapaho Native American Tribes, and was documented by William Clark on the Lewis and Clark Expedition. The site was active throughout the 1800s until, in 1878, flooding by the Missouri River collapsed a large portion of the bluff and resulted in the abandonment of the nearby town of Ionia, its namesake. Erosion and subsequent flooding has since collapsed the rest of the bluff. The Ionia Volcano has "erupted" twice, once in 1879 and again in 1901, with the latter eruption preceding a period of dormancy. The Ionia Volcano was sporadically active throughout the 1900s but this was largely confined to smoke and steam output. The heat generated by the bluff results from iron sulfide oxidation in carbonaceous shale when it is exposed to moisture and oxygen due to erosion.

Modern analysis has called into question if the bluff was witnessed by the Lewis and Clark Expedition or if another burning bluff in Maskell, Nebraska was observed. The site is classified as a High Potential Historic Site by the United States National Park Service.

== Geology and chemistry ==
The Ionia Volcano is a bluff formation largely made of Cretaceous age Carlile shale and clay. Much of the exposed shale is bleached grey or yellow, while freshly exposed shale is a dark, blue color. While many in the 1800s believed that the Ionia Volcano was an actual volcano, it does not have a magma chamber and its heat production is driven solely by chemical reactions. The bluff contains large quantities of gypsum within the lower parts of the shale and contains multiple fossil layers. Smectite clay is uniquely present in bluff but is more commonly acid weathered to bentonite and kaolinite. In particular, fossil samples of the ammonite, Subprionocyclus percarinatus, have been found in the clay at the Ionia Volcano. While the bluff in 1804 was approximately 200 ft (61 m) tall, the modern shale layers only protrude a few feet out of the ground (220 cm (7.2 ft) are exposed), making surveying difficult. This drop in height is due to erosion by the Missouri River, which has now buried 70% of the shale in sediment.

The heat reaction within the bluff primarily occurs due to the high concentration of iron sulfide (FeS_{2}) in the Carlile shale, mainly in the form of marcasite, halotrichite, and jarosite. These minerals collectively give the soil a color composition ranging from dark yellow to blue. Jarosite, specifically, makes up approximately 20% of the Carlile shale's composition and is responsible for the characteristic yellow color of the shale. Jarosite will present as vertical infillings within cracks in the shale, crystalline formations, and as approximately 6 cm (2.4 in) in diameter nodes. It also commonly forms crystals with gypsum in a ghost crystal pattern. Melanterite can also be found forming with blue, hair-like crystals extending through the clay layers. Halotrichite forms a white crust over the shale, but most of it has been weathered away.

The iron sulfide reacts with oxygen and water, forming ferrous iron (Fe^{+2}) and ferric iron (Fe^{+3}). Water is retained by the clay in the Carlile shale, enabling it to readily react with iron sulfide. This reaction is exothermic and prone to forming a feedback loop, as ferric iron is capable of oxidizing more iron sulfide. Furthermore, the reaction will produce hydrons (H^{+}) as a byproduct, which will lower the surrounding soil pH to as low as 3–5 and attract acidophilic bacteria that can also oxidize iron sulfide. Periodic eruptions of the Ionia Volcano occurred as erosion exposed fresh Carlile shale and iron sulfide to water, causing violent exothermic reactions. Analysis of similar burning bluffs has shown that surface temperatures can exceed 700 °F (371 °C) and deep rock temperatures can reach over 3,000 °F (1,650 °C).

== History ==
The first known accounts of Ionia Volcano come from the Ponca Tribe, who believed the site to be sacred. In 1896, writer William Huse, in his book The History of Dixon County, Nebraska, claimed the Arapaho Tribe also believed the site to be sacred, stating that chiefs and medicine men would perform sacrificial ceremonies at the Ionia Volcano. The first western documentation of the volcano was supposedly made by the Lewis and Clark Expedition. The expedition arrived at the Ionia Volcano on August 22, 1804, camped at the site for two days, and conversed with the local Native American tribes about the bluff's religious significance. On August 24, 1804, Captain William Clark wrote:

"We set out at the usual time and proceeded … to the Commencement of a blue clay bluff of 180 or 190 feet high on the L.S. Those Bluffs appear to have been latterly on fire, and at this time is too hot for a man to bear his hand in the earth at any depth, great appearance of Coal. An eminence quantity of cobalt or a crystalized substance which answers its description is on the face of the Bluff."

Clark went on to describe the volcano as having a "sulfurous smell". Other members of the expedition, including John Ordway, Patrick Gass, and Joseph Whitehouse, also documented the encounter. The party foraged for berries at the site before moving further westward. Throughout the early 1800s, French fur traders and explorers reported wildfires and dense smoke within the region. In 1832 and 1833, George Catlin, Carl Bogmer, and Jages Doppelheim all documented visiting the Ionia Volcano. In 1839, French explorer and geographer, J. N. Nicollet, traveled to the site and attempted to prove that the Ionia Volcano's heat was not volcanic in origin but rather the product of chemical reactions. Nicollet theorized that the decomposition of iron pyrite in water was the source of the heat and fire. In 1874, John Harwood Pierce named the bluff "Ionia Volcano" in the Omaha Daily Bee. Pierce named the bluff after the nearby town of Ionia, established in 1856. During this period, the site became a local attraction for tourists and geologists. Pierce later described the encounter:

"There, on a narrow plateau about half way up the bluff, we saw and smelt the sulphurous vapor which indicated the spot we sought. On arriving at the plateau we saw several fissures in the clay, from which issued vapor so hot that the ground in the vicinity was too warm to rest the hand on comfortably. On listening, we could hear strange sounds under our feet, like the distant roar of a blast furnace."

Pierce also stated that large fissures would form in the ground, radiating heat outward, and that the bluff was constructed largely of clay with gypsum formations and fossil layers. Joseph Brewer, a local businessman, had excavated a large fossil around this time that he later took on country-wide tours. In 1874, the redirection of the Missouri River left many residents of Ionia in fear that an eruption was likely to follow. This prompted renewed scientific interest in the site, with the predominant theory at the time being that the Ionia Volcano was an actual volcano with a magma chamber deep below the surface. These fears were compounded in 1877, after Nebraska experienced one of the strongest earthquakes in its recorded history; locals believed this was a sign of imminent eruption. In 1878, the Missouri River flooded, collapsing a large section of the Ionia Volcano. This also caused heavy damage to Ionia and resulted in the town being abandoned. Soon after, in 1879, the Ionia Volcano erupted, then entered into a state of dormancy. The New York Times reported that the collapse was partially caused by the Ionia Volcano's chemical reaction heating the banks of the Missouri River, destabilizing it. They further postulated that the eruptions were caused by the mixing of the lime, bi-sulfate, iron and/or coal rock layers. A second flood in 1881 further damaged the bluff, resulting in activity ceasing altogether. In 1882, historian A. T. Andreas reported that the site received little interest following its collapse.

On July 29, 1893, hunters began reporting that a fissure had reopened and the site had become active again. Around 1900, a reporter was caught building a fire on the Ionia Volcano in an attempt to show the volcano was still active. In 1901, the Ionia Volcano erupted again. The 1902 eruption of Mount Pelée sparked renewed interest in the Ionia Volcano, which had begun smoking again. One newspaper even called for the governor to send the National Guard to suppress the fires. In 1906, Erwin H. Barbour and George E. Condra, researchers from the University of Nebraska, published Geography of Nebraska and confirmed Nicollet's hypothesis that the oxidation of iron pyrite in carbonaceous shale, when exposed to water by erosion, was the chief cause of the heat. In 1940, following decades of dormancy, the Ionia Volcano began showing signs of activity, prompting fears of yet another eruption. This increased activity was limited to steam being given off from the site, believed to be the byproduct of limestone and water coming into contact, and the glow of underground fires could be seen from a distance.

The remains of the Ionia Volcano are located near Newcastle, Nebraska, close to the ghost town of Ionia and across from the Ionia Cemetery. A historical marker describing the "volcano" is also located in nearby Newcastle. The United States National Park Service considers the site a High Potential Historic Site, with the Ionia Volcano being one of the first geological heritage sites in the United States.

== Analysis ==
In 2011, the Lewis and Clark Trail Heritage Foundation published a report on the Ionia Volcano. In this report, geologist John W. Jengo claimed that the burning bluff described in Clark's journal was not the Ionia Volcano, but rather, another burning bluff located near Maskell, Nebraska. This finding was made following a historic reconstruction of the Missouri River's 1804 channel, in which he found that the Lewis and Clark expedition had supposedly visited a site near the Ionia Volcano on August 22 but did not report it until August 24. The report concluded that the expedition had observed a separate burning bluff and the expedition was located on the opposite side of the Missouri river, relative to the Ionia Volcano. Jengo also claimed that burning bluffs were relatively commonplace along the Missouri river during the 1800s, but few are still active today, the result of most of them having been submerged by flooding.

== See also ==
- Missouri River Valley
