= Nebraska Highway 2 =

State highway in Nebraska, U.S.

State Highway 2
- N-2 highlighted in red

Route information
- Maintained by NDOT
- Length: 422.75 mi (680.35 km)

Western segment
- Length: 370.88 mi (596.87 km)
- West end: N-71 / SD 71 north of Crawford
- Major intersections: US 20 in Crawford; US 385 in Alliance; US 83 in Thedford; N-92 from Merna to Ansley; US 183 in Ansley; US 30 / US 34 / US 281 in Grand Island
- East end: I-80 southeast of Grand Island

Eastern segment
- Length: 51.87 mi (83.48 km)
- West end: US 77 south of Lincoln
- Major intersections: N-50 in Syracuse; US 75 in Nebraska City
- East end: Iowa 2 at Missouri River in Nebraska City

Location
- Country: United States
- State: Nebraska
- Counties: Western segment: Sioux, Dawes, Box Butte, Sheridan, Grant, Hooker, Thomas, Blaine, Custer, Sherman, Buffalo, Hall, Hamilton; Eastern segment: Lancaster, Otoe

Highway system
- Nebraska State Highway System; Interstate; US; State; Link; Spur; State Spurs; Recreation
← N-1	→ N-4

Nebraska Highway 2 (N-2) is a state highway in Nebraska consisting of two discontinuous segments. The western segment begins at the South Dakota border northwest of Crawford and ends southeast of Grand Island at an intersection with Interstate 80 (I-80). The eastern segment begins in Lincoln and ends at the Iowa border at Nebraska City. Previously, the two segments were connected via a route shared with U.S. Highway 34 (US 34) between Grand Island and Lincoln.

== Route description ==
=== Western segment ===
The western segment of N-2 begins at the South Dakota border north of Crawford in a concurrency with N-71. The road goes east, southeast, and then south into Crawford. In Crawford, there is a concurrency with US 20. N-2 and N-71 both continue south from Crawford through Marsland, Nebraska. The two highways split west of Hemingford, Nebraska and N-2 turns east towards Hemingford. At Hemingford, N-2 turns southeast towards Alliance. At Berea, N-2 meets US 385 and the two overlap into Alliance.

At Alliance, N-2 goes east into the Sand Hills. It goes through several small towns, including Hyannis, Mullen and Thedford. In Thedford, N-2 briefly overlaps US 83. East of Thedford, near Halsey, is the Nebraska National Forest. At Dunning, N-2 intersects N-91 and turns southeasterly towards Broken Bow and Grand Island.

After turning southeasterly at Dunning, N-2 meets N-92 in Merna. The two highways overlap through Broken Bow and separate when they meet US 183 in Ansley. N-2 meets N-10 in Hazard, N-68 in Ravenna and N-11 in Cairo. On the northwest edge of Grand Island, N-2 becomes a four-lane divided highway and then encounters US 281. N-2 then follows US 281 along the western edge of Grand Island until it meets US 34 and then those two routes overlap through the southern edge of Grand Island. N-2 and US 34 cross the Platte River and shortly thereafter, they separate and N-2 turns south towards Interstate 80 (I-80). At I-80, the western segment of N-2 ends.

=== Eastern segment ===
The eastern segment of N-2 begins as the Lincoln South Beltway, a freeway south of Lincoln, at a semi-directional T interchange with US 77. Passing by Lincoln to the south, N-2 becomes a four-lane divided highway following a diamond interchange with Nebraska Parkway, its former alignment through the city, southeast of it. It soon encounters several small towns and highways. It meets N-43 north of Bennet and overlaps it for 5 miles (8.0 km), until shortly before Palmyra. Near Syracuse, there is a bypass of that community and there is a freeway exit for N-50. It continues east and near Nebraska City, it meets US 75 and the two highways are together briefly until the southern edge of Nebraska City. Also at this intersection, N-2 Business begins and goes through Nebraska City. After they separate, N-2 heads east and then northeast, meets the eastern end of N-2 Business and crosses the Missouri River over the Nebraska City Bridge and enters Iowa. In Iowa, the highway continues as Iowa Highway 2.

The eastern segment of N-2 serves as part of a connecting route, along with US 77, between I-29 in Iowa and I-80 in Lincoln. It allows traffic coming from Kansas City, Missouri to go to Lincoln and points west of Lincoln to bypass Omaha. To better facilitate this link between I-80 and I-29, in February 2020, the Nebraska DOT began a major project to construct the Lincoln South Beltway to carry N-2. This modern divided and controlled access freeway will give a direct route from 120th Street to US 77 near Saltillo. Construction was planned for completion in 2023. The beltway opened to traffic on December 14, 2022, six months ahead of expected in May 2023. The interchanges at Bennet Road-Jamaica Avenue and 82nd Street-84th Street opened in November 2023.

The eastern segment of Nebraska Highway 2 has the commemorative name of Jerome and Betty Warner Memorial Highway. The portion of the highway east of the west U.S. 75 junction to the Nebraska City Bridge in the Nebraska City area is known as the J. Sterling Morton Beltway, in honor of the creator of Arbor Day and the former Secretary of Agriculture.

== Major intersections ==
All exits are unnumbered.

County	Location	mi	km	Destinations	Notes
Nebraska–South Dakota line		0.000	0.000	SD 71 north – Ardmore	Sioux–Fall River county line; western end of N-71 overlap; continuation into South Dakota
Dawes	Crawford	28.47	45.82	US 20 east – Fort Robinson, Harrison	Western end of US 20 overlap
Dawes	Crawford	29.33	47.20	US 20 west (McPherson Street) – Chadron	Eastern end of US 20 overlap
Box Butte	Dorsey Precinct	55.17	88.79	N-71 south (Dodge Road) – Scottsbluff	Eastern end of N-71 overlap
Box Butte	Hemingford	67.32	108.34	L-7E east – Chadron	
Box Butte	Berea	77.48	124.69	US 385 north – Chadron	Western end of US 385 overlap
Box Butte	Alliance	85.41	137.45	US 385 south (County Road 61) – Bridgeport	Eastern end of US 385 overlap
Box Butte	Alliance	87.45	140.74	N-87 north (Flack Avenue) – Hay Springs	
Sheridan	Lakeside	110.42	177.70	N-250 north – Rushville	
Sheridan	Ellsworth	118.12	190.10	N-27 north (Sheridan Road) – Gordon	
Grant	Hyannis	145.61	234.34	N-61 north – Merriman	Western end of N-61 overlap
Grant	Hyannis	147.32	237.09	N-61 south – Arthur	Eastern end of N-61 overlap
Hooker	Mullen	184.81	297.42	N-97 – Valentine, Tryon	
Thomas	Seneca	196.02	315.46	S-86A north (Athens Street)	
Thomas	Thedford	210.79	339.23	US 83 south – Stapleton, North Platte	Western end of US 83 overlap
Thomas	Thedford	212.31	341.68	US 83 north – Valentine	Eastern end of US 83 overlap
Thomas	Natick Pricinct	226.08	363.84	S-86B south	
Blaine	Dunning	237.61	382.40	N-91 east – Brewster	
Blaine	Dunning	237.97	382.98	S-5A west (Jewett Avenue)	
Custer	Anselmo	258.37	415.81	S-21A east (Smith Avenue)	
Custer	Merna	269.39	433.54	N-92 west – Stapleton, North Platte	Western end of N-92 overlap
Custer	Broken Bow	278.66	448.46	N-21 south (8th Avenue) – Lexington	
Custer	Broken Bow	279.83	450.34	N-70 east – Ord	
Custer	Ansley	295.31	475.26	US 183 north / N-92 east – Loup City, Sargent	Eastern end of N-92 overlap; western end of US 183 overlap
Custer	Ansley	295.80	476.04	US 183 south – Miller, Holdrege	Eastern end of US 183 overlap
Sherman	Harrison Precinct	316.59	509.50	N-10 – Loup City, Kearney	
Sherman	Hazard	316.75	509.76	777 Road to N-10 – Kearney	
Buffalo	Garfield Township	327.44	526.96	N-68 east (Ravenna Road) – Ravenna	
Hall	Cairo	343.65	553.05	N-11 – Dannebrog, Wood River	
Hall	Grand Island	356.00	572.93	US 281 north / Alt. Truck Route to US 30	Interchange; western end of US 281 overlap; serves Central Nebraska Regional Airport
Hall	Grand Island	358.75	577.35	US 30 – Kearney, Downtown	Interchange
Hall	Grand Island	359.78	579.01	US 34 west / US 281 south (Tom Osborne Expressway) to I-80 – Hastings	Eastern end of US 281 overlap; western end of US 34 overlap
Merrick	Platte River	365.45	588.13	Bridge	
Hamilton	Precinct 5	367.31	591.13	US 34 east – Aurora	Eastern end of US 34 overlap
Hamilton	Precinct 5–Precinct 2 line	370.75– 370.88	596.66– 596.87	I-80 – Lincoln, Kearney	Eastern end of state maintenance; exit 318 on I-80
Gap in route
Lancaster	Yankee Hill–Centerville precinct line			US 77 north (Homestead Expressway) to I-80	Western end of state maintenance; west end of freeway; semi-directional T interchange, opened to traffic on December 14, 2022
Lancaster	Centerville Precinct			US 77 south / Saltillo Road – Beatrice	Westbound exit and eastbound entrance; semi-directional T interchange, opened to traffic on December 14, 2022
Lancaster	Saltillo Precinct			Jamaica Avenue / Bennet Road	Dogbone interchange, opened to traffic in November 2023
Lancaster	Saltillo Precinct			68th Street / 70th Street	Dogbone interchange, opened to traffic on December 14, 2022
Lancaster	Saltillo Precinct			82nd Street / 84th Street	Parclo AB2 interchange, opened to traffic in November 2023
Lancaster	Grant–Stockton precinct line			Nebraska Parkway – Lincoln 120th Street	Diamond interchange; east end of freeway; Nebraska Pkwy. is former N-2 west, opened to traffic on December 14, 2022
Lancaster	Stockton Precinct	466.40	750.60	N-43 south – Bennet	Western end of N-43 overlap; interchange
Otoe	North Palmyra Precinct	471.66	759.06	N-43 north (County Road 6) – Eagle	Eastern end of N-43 overlap
Otoe	Palmyra	472.69	760.72	S-66A south (A Street) – Douglas	
Otoe	Syracuse Precinct	484.71	780.07	N-50 (30th Road) – Syracuse	Interchange
Otoe	Delaware Precinct	492.63	792.81	N-67 (46th Road)	
Otoe	Belmont–Four Mile precinct line	499.31– 499.85	803.56– 804.43	US 75 north (Lewis and Clark Trail north) / N-2 Bus. east (4th Corso) – Omaha, Nebraska City	Interchange; western end of US 75/LCT overlap
Otoe	Nebraska City	501.93	807.78	US 75 south / Lewis and Clark Trail south (64th Road) / US 75 Bus. north (11th Street) – Nebraska City, Auburn	Interchange; eastern end of US 75/LCT overlap
Otoe	Four Mile Precinct	503.69	810.61	N-2 Bus. west (4th Corso)	
Missouri River		503.97	811.06	Nebraska City Bridge; Nebraska–Iowa line	
Missouri River		503.97	811.06	Iowa 2 east to I-29 – Iowa	Continuation into Iowa
1.000 mi = 1.609 km; 1.000 km = 0.621 mi: Concurrency terminus; Incomplete access

== Nebraska City business route ==
State Highway 2 Business
- 4th Corso
- Location: Nebraska City, Nebraska
- Length: 4.4 mi (7.1 km)

Nebraska Highway 2 Business (N-2 Bus.) is a 4.4-mile (7.1 km) business loop of N-2 travelling through Nebraska City. Locally, the highway is also known as 4th Corso.

The entire route is in Otoe County.

Location	mi	km	Destinations	Notes
Belmont–Four Mile precinct line	0.00– 0.7	0.00– 1.1	N-2 west – Lincoln US 75 / N-2 east (Lewis and Clark Trail)	Interchange; western terminus
Nebraska City	2.8	4.5	US 75 Bus. (11th Street)	Serves CHI Health St. Mary's Hospital
Four Mile Precinct	4.4	7.1	N-2	Eastern terminus; road continues south as Valmont Drive (67 Road)
1.000 mi = 1.609 km; 1.000 km = 0.621 mi
