= U.S. Route 20 in Nebraska =

Section of U.S. Highway in Nebraska

U.S. Highway 20
- US-20 highlighted in red

Route information
- Maintained by NDOT
- Length: 431.60 mi (694.59 km)
- Existed: 1926–present
- Tourist routes: Bridges to Buttes Byway

Major junctions
- West end: US 20 west of Harrison
- US 385 near Chadron; US 83 near Valentine; US 183 at Bassett; US 281 at O'Neill; US 275 at O'Neill; US 81 near Randolph; US 75 / US 77 near South Sioux City
- East end: I-129 / US 20 / US 75 at South Sioux City

Location
- Country: United States
- State: Nebraska
- Counties: Sioux, Dawes, Sheridan, Cherry, Brown, Rock, Holt, Antelope, Pierce, Cedar, Dixon, Dakota

Highway system
- United States Numbered Highway System; List; Special; Divided; Nebraska State Highway System; Interstate; US; State; Link; Spur; State Spurs; Recreation
← N-19	→ N-21

U.S. Highway 20 (US-20) is a part of the United States Numbered Highway System that runs for 3,365 miles (5,415 km) from Newport, Oregon, to Boston, Massachusetts. Within the state of Nebraska, it is a state highway that begins on the Wyoming–Nebraska state line west of Harrison near the Niobrara River and runs to the Nebraska–Iowa state line in South Sioux City. Throughout its 431.60-mile (694.59 km) length, the route passes through a diverse range of landscapes, including bluffs and escarpments in the Nebraska Panhandle, the Sandhills in the northern part of the state, and rolling hills and plains as the highway approaches the Missouri River valley south of Sioux City, Iowa. Throughout its length, US-20 is a two-lane highway with the exception of the easternmost 8.45 miles (13.60 km), which is a four-lane divided highway, the last 3.21 miles (5.17 km) of which is concurrent with Interstate 129 (I-129). The 197 miles (317 km) between the Wyoming border and Valentine is designated as the Bridges to Buttes Byway, one of nine scenic byways in the state of Nebraska.

== Route description ==
=== Bridges to Buttes Scenic Byway ===
The Nebraska Department of Transportation has designated nine stretches of state highway as scenic byways throughout the state. These are typically two-lane highways traveling through diverse terrain and passing by historical markers and attractions that put the rich history of Nebraska's past on display. Along US-20, the route between the Wyoming state line and Valentine, a 197-mile (317 km) stretch, is designated the Bridges to Buttes Scenic Byway. Along this route, the highway passes through diverse landscapes such as escarpments and the Sandhills as well as historical points of interest including Fort Robinson.

==== Wyoming state line to Rushville ====
US-20 enters Nebraska along the Wyoming state line east of Van Tassell just north of the Niobrara River, passing through gently rolling plains with intermittent rock outcroppings on the way to Harrison. Harrison, the state's northwesternmost town, is home to the Sioux County Historical Museum. Just a few miles northeast of town lies Sowbelly Canyon, a part of the Pine Ridge escarpment. The highway then continues into the eastern reaches of Sioux County, which are marked by high plains, bluffs, and escarpments, including the Red Cloud Buttes as the road passes through Fort Robinson State Park. The park is home to Fort Robinson, a former U.S. Army fort instrumental during the Sioux Wars between 1876 and 1890 and where Crazy Horse surrendered in 1877. From there, the highway continues to the northeast, where it enters Crawford. Here, the highway runs to the north concurrently with Nebraska Highway 2 (N-2) and N-71 along the east side of town for a mile (1.6 km) before turning to the northeast, traveling through rolling plains passing south of Whitney Lake before meeting up with US-385 west of Chadron. US-20 runs concurrently with US-385 to the west side of town, where US-385 departs to the south while US-20 continues east through Chadron.

Chadron is home to Chadron State Park, Nebraska's oldest state park containing nearly 1,000 acres (400 ha) of Pine Ridge wilderness. It is also home to the Pine Ridge Ranger District of the Nebraska National Forest. The Museum of Fur Trade is also located in Chadron at the site of a former fur trading post run by the American Fur Company between 1837 and 1876. The highway leaves Chadron and runs southeast alongside the Little Bordeaux Creek. As the road continues toward Hay Springs, it makes a 400-foot (120 m) climb as it passes through a portion of the Pine Ridge Escarpment. To the north, the Beaver Wall escarpment provides views of the surroundings including the buttes at Crawford all the way to the Black Hills. In Hay Springs, US-20 meets up with N-87, which joins from the south. Together, the two highways run concurrently for nearly nine miles (14 km), through Hay Springs and into Rushville. On the west side of Rushville, N-87 leaves to the north toward Pine Ridge, South Dakota, while US-20 continues through town.

==== Rushville to Valentine ====
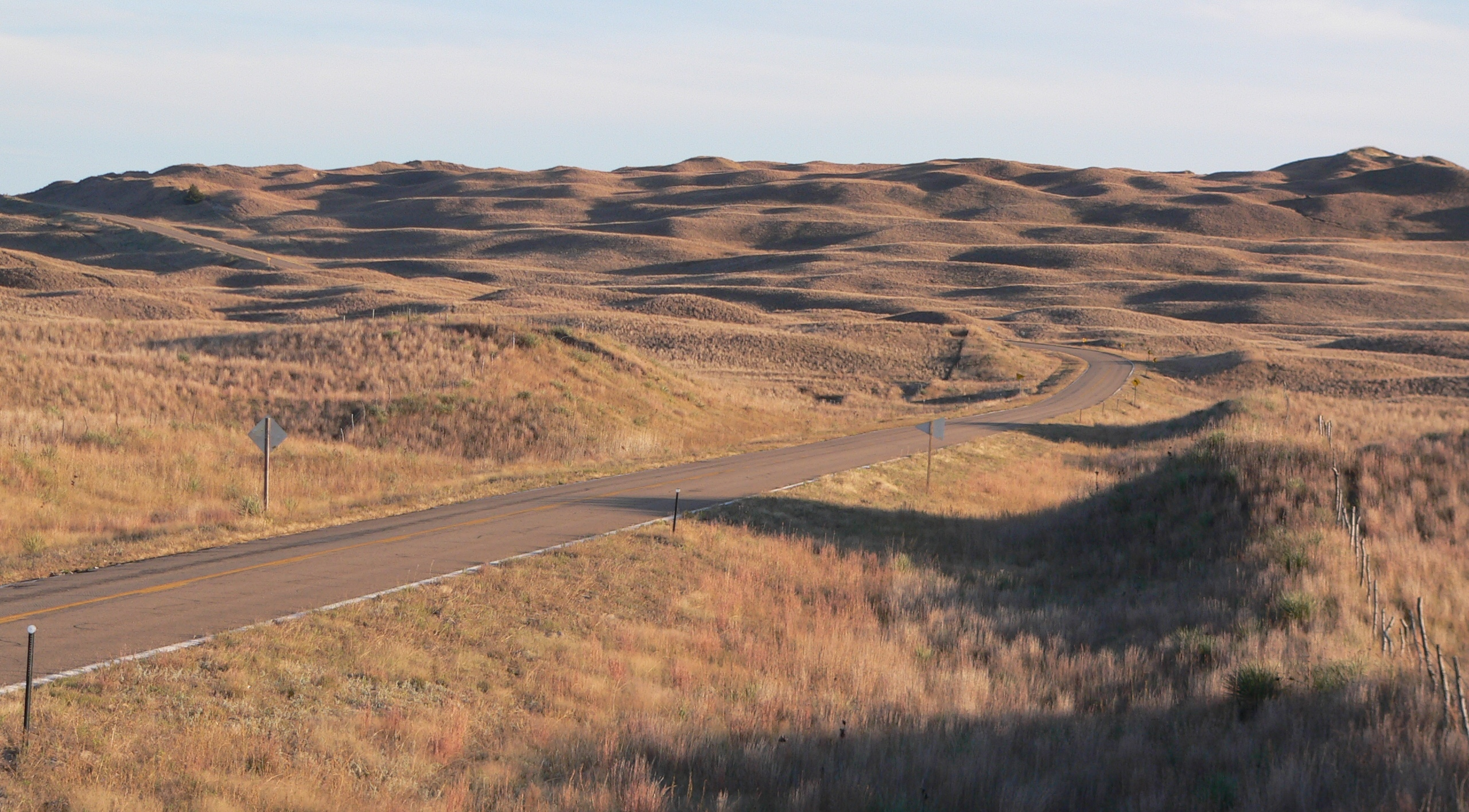
The Sandhills

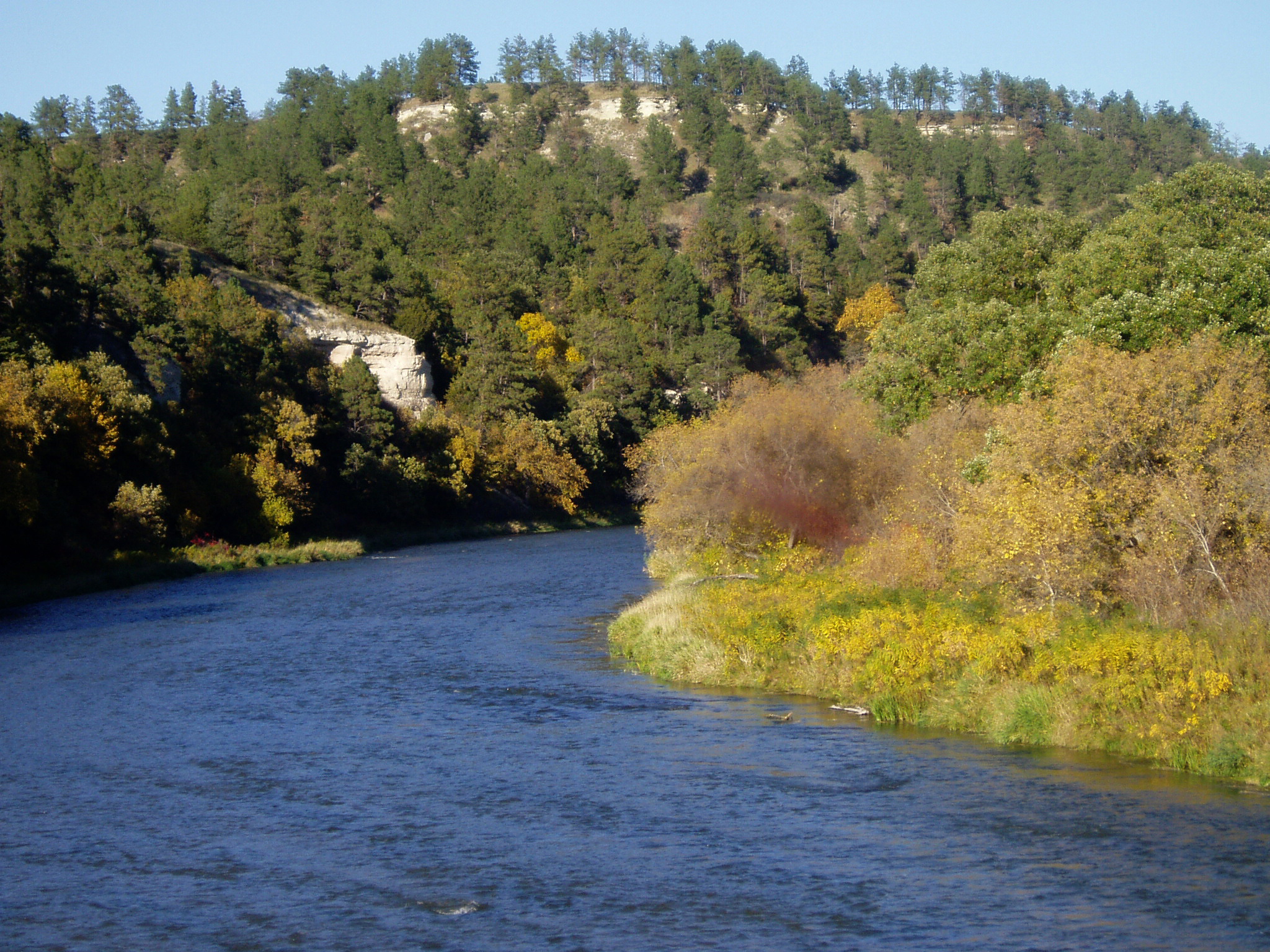
Bluffs covered with Ponderosa pine line a curve on the Niobrara National Scenic River

After departing Rushville, US-20 bends to the northeast, passing agricultural fields and grasslands. The highway passes through the small village of Clinton and continues on to the northeast before reaching the city of Gordon. Gordon was home to outlaw Doc Middleton who operated a saloon in town between 1900 and 1913. US-20 leaves the city traveling east and, just as the road turns to the northeast 12 miles (19 km) east of Gordon, enters the western reaches of the Sandhills. The road winds its way to the northeast before arriving at the village of Merriman in Cherry County. Cherry County is the largest county, by land area, in Nebraska; with over 6,000 square miles (16,000 km^{2}), it is larger than the states of Connecticut, Delaware, and Rhode Island combined. Here, US-20 intersects N-61, which is one of the most desolate highways in the state. Traveling south, it is almost 70 miles (110 km) to the next town, Hyannis. From Merriman, US-20 continues east through the northern reaches of the Sandhills. Between Merriman and Crookston, the highway is within five miles (8.0 km) of the South Dakota border.

Continuing through the Sandhills, the highway winds its way east until it enters the small village of Cody. Cody was named for a railroad foreman and not Buffalo Bill. The highway continues on to the east through the small villages of Nenzel, Kilgore, and Crookston. Here, the highway crosses over the Minnechaduza Creek, marking the northern extent of the Sandhills. The route then turns southeast, running parallel to the Minnechaduza Creek along the edge of the Sandhills toward the city of Valentine. US-20 meets up with several other highways in Valentine, US-83, N-12, and N-97, serving as a crossroads of North Central Nebraska. The Niobrara River runs along the southeast side of Valentine and the portion east of town is the start of the Niobrara Valley Preserve, which preserves thousands of acres or riverine canyons and grasslands along a 25-mile (40 km) stretch of the river. This portion of the river is also designated as a National Scenic River. Valentine marks the eastern terminus of the Bridges to Buttes Scenic Byway.

=== Valentine to O'Neill ===
From Valentine, US-20 takes a southeast line crossing the Niobrara River back into the sandhills. It continues toward the southeast through the small villages of Wood Lake and Johnstown before turning to the east. After leaving Johnstown, the road enters flat plains where agricultural fields utilizing center pivot irrigation dot the landscape as the highway heads east toward Ainsworth. In Ainsworth, the road meets up with N-7 and runs concurrently for 5.5 miles (8.9 km) before US-183 also joins from the south. The three highways continue east and cross over a canyon formed by Long Pine Creek just north of Long Pine. Nine miles (14 km) later, the three highways diverge in Bassett. N-7 continues north toward Springview while US-183 heads south to Taylor. US-20 continues east through the small villages of Newport and Stuart, before turning southeast and entering the city of Atkinson. From here, the highway continues east along the southern edge of flat plains dotted with agricultural fields into the city of O'Neill. O'Neill is located in the Elkhorn Valley and lies just north of the river of the same name.

=== O'Neill to Iowa ===
US-20 leaves O'Neill headed southeast concurrently with US-275 for 13 miles (21 km) before turning due east toward the village of Orchard. The highway continues east beyond Orchars and past the small villages of Royal, Brunswick, and Plainview. As US-20 continues east toward Osmond, there is a marked change in terrain as the road transitions from the flat plains to rolling hills of eastern Nebraska on the way to the Missouri River. From Osmond, the highway continues east before crossing US-81 then turns northeast and travels along with Middle Logan Creek through the communities of Randolph and Belden. The highway takes a jog to the north at Laurel for three miles (4.8 km) before turning back to the east. After passing by the towns of Waterbury, Willis, and Jackson, US-20 emerges from the rolling hills into the Missouri River plain. As it approaches South Sioux City, the highway becomes a four-lane divided highway for the first time along its entire length. Shortly, thereafter, the highway becomes expressway and runs concurrently with I-129 as it intersects US-75 and US-77. The highway continues east to the Missouri River, where it crosses into Iowa, functioning as a bypass around the southeastern side of Sioux City, Iowa.

== History ==
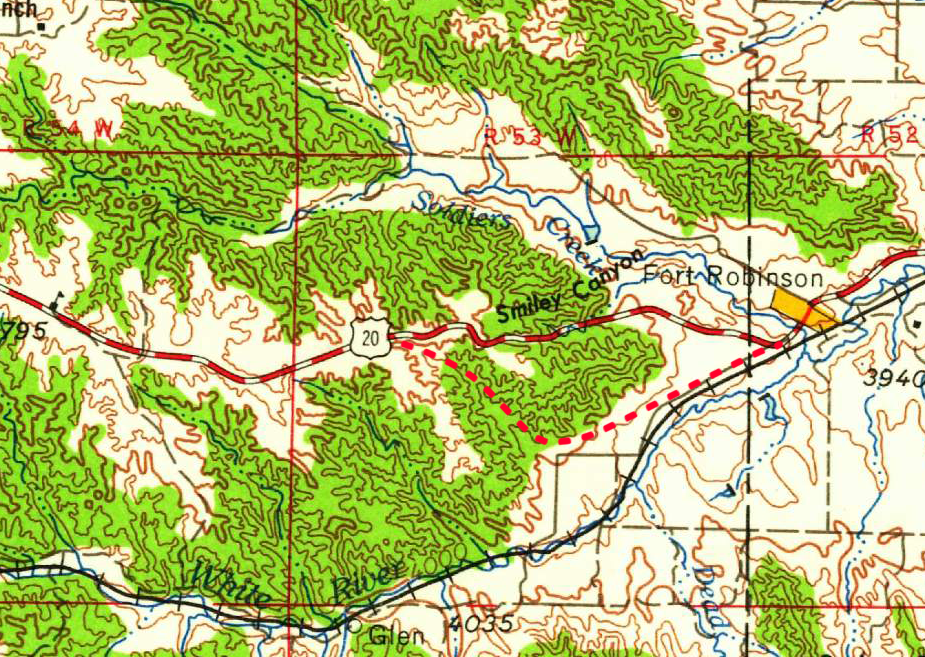
Former US-20 alignment through Smiley Canyon with present-day alignment indicated in dashed red

Prior to the assignment of US-20, this route across northern Nebraska carried several different route numbers. In 1922, the highway followed the routes of N-79, N-78, N-77, N-65, and N-49 from west to east between the Wyoming state line and South Sioux City. This route generally followed the former Cowboy Trail, part of the Chicago and North Western Railway, from Wyoming to Sioux City via O'Neill. This is now a partially abandoned railway that has been converted into a biking and hiking trail. In the mid-1920s, the multiple state highway designations gave way to a single route number, N-1, which encompassed the entire route from Wyoming to Iowa and was the immediate predecessor to US-20 in 1926.

There have been a few realignments of US-20 since its designation in 1926. An older alignment of US-20 ran about three miles (4.8 km) south of the current section east of Laurel. This alignment went due east from Laurel, along present-day 869th Road, passing Dixon and Allen to an intersection with present-day N-9, where it turned north to meet up with the current alignment. West of Fort Robinson, an old alignment of US-20 traveled along modern-day Smiley Canyon Scenic Drive. This is a winding road that runs through Smiley Canyon north of the current alignment. During the winters, this area of US-20 would become treacherous, leading to many accidents.

In November 2010, Nebraska Governor Dave Heineman approved designating US-20 from Hay Springs to Fort Robinson in honor of Crazy Horse, capping a year-long effort by citizens of Chadron. The designation may extend east another 100 miles (160 km) through Cherry County to Valentine. The following year, on June 5, the highway was officially dedicated during a ceremony at Fort Robinson State Park.

== Major intersections ==
County	Location	mi	km	Exit	Destinations	Notes
Sioux	Bowen Precinct	0.00	0.00		US 20 west – Lusk, Casper	Continuation into Wyoming
Sioux	Bowen Precinct	0.00	0.00		Western terminus of Bridges to Buttes Scenic Byway	
Sioux	Harrison	8.99	14.47		N-29 south (Main Street) – Agate Fossil Beds National Monument, Mitchell	
Dawes	Crawford	35.34	56.87		N-2 / N-71 south – Alliance, Scottsbluff	Western end of N-2/N-71 overlap
Dawes	Crawford	36.20	58.26		N-2 / N-71 north – Toadstool Geologic Park	Eastern end of N-2/N-71 overlap
Dawes	Precinct 9	45.08	72.55		S-23A north – Whitney	
Dawes	Precinct 2	56.07	90.24		L-23D north	
Dawes	Precinct 2	56.40	90.77		US 385 north – Hot Springs, SD, Rapid City, SD	Western end of US 385 overlap
Dawes	Chadron	58.58	94.28		US 385 south (Ash Street) – Alliance	Eastern end of US 385 overlap
Sheridan	Hay Springs	78.88	126.95		N-87 south – Alliance	Western end of N-87 overlap
Sheridan	Rushville	90.27	145.28		N-87 north – Pine Ridge, SD	Eastern end of N-87 overlap
Sheridan	Rushville	91.29	146.92		N-250 south (Chamberlain Street)	
Sheridan	Gordon	105.91	170.45		N-27 (Main Street)	
Cherry	Merriman	135.81	218.57		N-61 south (Mills Street) – Hyannis	Western end of N-61 overlap
Cherry	Merriman	135.84	218.61		N-61 north – Martin, SD	Eastern end of N-61 overlap
Cherry	Nenzel Precinct	167.03	268.81		S-16F south (Main Street) – Nenzel	
Cherry	Valentine	196.72	316.59		N-97 south (Airport Road) – Mullen	
Cherry	Valentine	196.72	316.59		Eastern terminus of Bridges to Buttes Scenic Byway	
Cherry	Valentine	196.92	316.91		US 83 north (Main Street) – Mission, SD	Western end of US 83 overlap
Cherry	Valentine Precinct	202.08	325.22		US 83 south – Thedford, North Platte	Eastern end of US 83 overlap
Brown	Ainsworth	242.10	389.62		N-7 south (Main Street) – Brewster	Western end of N-7 overlap
Brown	North Pine Precinct	247.57	398.43		N-7 north – Springview	Eastern end of N-7 overlap
Brown	North Pine Precinct	250.41	403.00		S-9A south – Long Pine	
Rock	Bassett	259.19	417.13		US 183 (Clark Street) – Taylor	
Rock	Newport	270.27	434.96		N-137 north (4th Street)	
Holt	Atkinson	289.27	465.53		N-11 north – Butte	Western end of N-11 overlap
Holt	Atkinson	289.78	466.36		N-11 south (Hyde Street) – Burwell	Eastern end of N-11 overlap
Holt	O'Neill	307.11	494.25		US 281 north (Harrison Street)	Western end of US 281 overlap
Holt	O'Neill	307.61	495.05		US 281 south (4th Street) / US 275 begins	Eastern end of US 281 overlap, western end of US 275 overlap
Holt	Golden Township	320.64	516.02		US 275 east	Eastern end of US 275 overlap
Holt	Golden Township	322.82	519.53		S-45A north – Page	
Holt	Golden Township	326.71	525.79		L-45B south – Ewing	
Antelope	Ellsworth Township	342.75	551.60		N-14	
Antelope	Ellsworth Township	345.79	556.50		S-2B south (527th Avenue) – Brunswick	
Antelope	Bazile Township	349.77	562.90		N-13 north	Western end of N-13 overlap
Pierce	Plainview	354.45	570.43		N-13 south	Eastern end of N-13 overlap
Pierce	Osmond	364.57	586.72		N-121 south (546th Avenue)	Western end of N-121 overlap
Pierce	Osmond	367.86	592.01		N-121 north (549th Avenue)	Eastern end of N-121 overlap
Pierce	Eastern Precinct	371.85	598.43		S-70A north (553rd Avenue) – McLean	
Pierce	Eastern Precinct	373.85	601.65		US 81 (555th Avenue) – Norfolk, Yankton, SD	
Cedar	Belden	385.39	620.23		N-57 north (566th Avenue)	Western end of N-57 overlap
Cedar	Belden	386.41	621.87		N-57 south (567th Avenue)	Eastern end of N-57 overlap
Cedar	Laurel	391.44	629.96		N-15 south	Western end of N-15 overlap
Cedar	Precinct 15	393.95	634.00		N-15 north (572nd Avenue) to N-59 – Coleridge, Hartington, Weigh Station	Eastern end of N-15 overlap
Cedar	Precinct 15	394.65	635.13		N-59 west (872nd Road) to N-15 – Coleridge, Hartington	Former L-14D
Dixon	Clark Township	399.23	642.50		N-116 south (577nd Avenue)	
Dixon	Galena Township	406.96	654.94		N-9 south	Western end of N-9 overlap
Dixon	Galena Township	407.77	656.24		N-9 north	Eastern end of N-9 overlap
Dixon	Ottercreek Township	413.08	664.79		S-26A south – Waterbury	
Dakota	St. John's Precinct	418.10	672.87		N-12 west / Lewis and Clark Trail	
Dakota	Covington Precinct	426.36	686.16		N-110 south (G Avenue)	
Dakota	Covington Precinct	428.40	689.44		I-129 begins	Western end of I-129 overlap
Dakota	Covington Precinct	428.79	690.07	1	US 75 south / US 77 / Lewis and Clark Trail – Fair Grounds, Sioux City	Western end of US-75 overlap; signed as exits 1A (south) and 1B (north)
Dakota	South Sioux City	429.49– 430.36	691.20– 692.60	2	US 20 Bus. east – South Sioux City, Dakota City	
Missouri River		431.60	694.59	Sergeant Floyd Memorial Bridge; Nebraska–Iowa line		
Missouri River		431.60	694.59		I-129 east / US 20 east / US 75 north – Sioux City	Continuation into Sioux City, Iowa
1.000 mi = 1.609 km; 1.000 km = 0.621 mi: Concurrency terminus

U.S. Route 20
Previous state: Wyoming	Nebraska	Next state: Iowa
