= South Dakota Highway 391 =

State highway in South Dakota, United States

Highway 391

Route information
- Maintained by SDDOT
- Length: 3.362 mi (5.411 km)

Major junctions
- South end: N-27 at the Nebraska state line southeast of Denby
- North end: US 18 near Denby

Location
- Country: United States
- State: South Dakota
- Counties: Oglala Lakota

Highway system
- South Dakota State Trunk Highway System; Interstate; US; State
← US 385	→ SD 407

South Dakota Highway 391 (SD 391) is a 3.362-mile-long (5.411 km) state highway in the southwestern part of the U.S. state of South Dakota. It travels from Nebraska Highway 27 (N-27) at the Nebraska state line, southeast of Denby, to U.S. Route 18 (US 18) east-southeast of Denby. The highway is located entirely within Oglala Lakota County and in the Pine Ridge Indian Reservation. It is maintained by the South Dakota Department of Transportation (SDDOT), and is not part of the National Highway System.

== Route description ==
SD 391 begins at the Nebraska state line as a continuation of N-27 and travels northeast through rolling plains on the Pine Ridge Indian Reservation in Oglala Lakota County. The highway curves to the northwest, then bends to the north near its northern terminus. Shortly after this, the route ends at an intersection with US 18.

SD 391 is maintained by SDDOT. In 2012, the traffic on the highway was measured in average annual daily traffic, and SD 391 had an average of 920 vehicles. The designation is not a part of the National Highway System, a system of highways important to the nation's defense, economy, and mobility.

== Major intersections ==
The entire route is in Oglala Lakota County.

Location	mi	km	Destinations	Notes
	0.000	0.000	N-27 south	Continuation into Nebraska
	3.362	5.411	US 18 / Gordon Junction Road north – Pine Ridge, Martin	Northern terminus of SD 391; southern terminus of CR 11
1.000 mi = 1.609 km; 1.000 km = 0.621 mi
