= Nebraska Highway 29 =

State highway in Nebraska, U.S.

State Highway 29

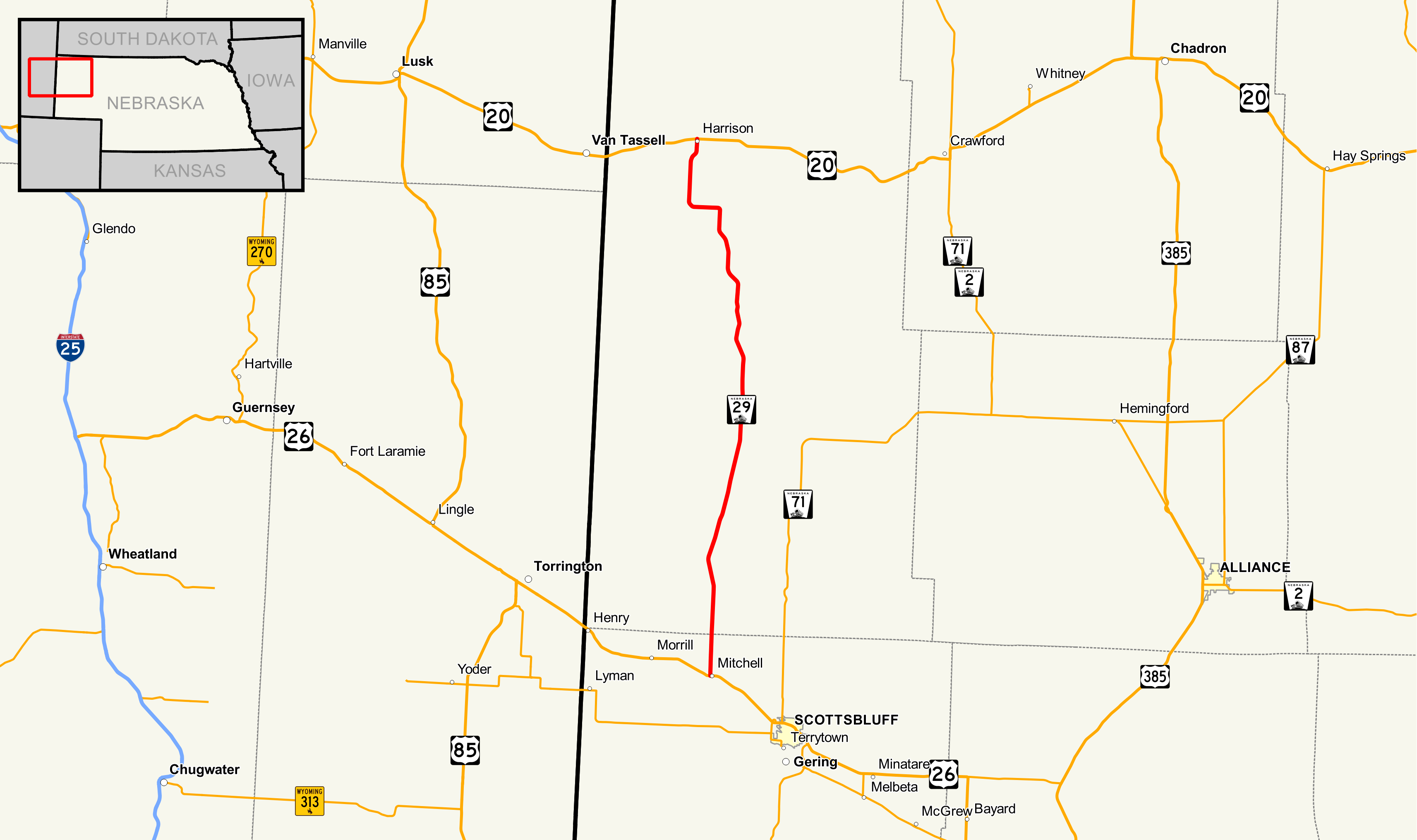
- Nebraska Highway 29 highlighted in red

Route information
- Maintained by NDOT
- Length: 55.81 mi (89.82 km)
- Existed: 1925–present

Major junctions
- South end: US 26 in Mitchell
- North end: US 20 in Harrison

Location
- Country: United States
- State: Nebraska
- Counties: Scotts Bluff, Sioux

Highway system
- Nebraska State Highway System; Interstate; US; State; Link; Spur; State Spurs; Recreation
← N-27	→ US 30

Nebraska Highway 29 is a highway in western Nebraska. It runs for 56 miles (90 km). It has a southern terminus at U.S. Highway 26 in Mitchell and a northern terminus at U.S. Highway 20 in Harrison.

== Route description ==
Nebraska Highway 29 begins in Mitchell at US 26. It proceeds north for 33 miles (53 km) to Agate and the Agate Fossil Beds National Monument, where the highway crosses the Niobrara River. It continues north, with a short westerly segment, to Harrison, where it meets US 20 and ends.

== Major intersections ==
County	Location	mi	km	Destinations	Notes
Scotts Bluff	Mitchell	0.00	0.00	19th Avenue south – North Platte River, N-92	Continuation south beyond southern terminus
Scotts Bluff	Mitchell	0.00	0.00	US 26 (Broadway Street) – Scottsbluff, Torrington	Southern terminus
Sioux	Harrison	55.81	89.82	US 20 (5th Street) – Chadron, Lusk	Northern terminus
Sioux	Harrison	55.81	89.82	Main Street north – Gilbert-Baker Wildlife Area	Continuation north beyond northern terminus
1.000 mi = 1.609 km; 1.000 km = 0.621 mi
