= U.S. Route 385 in Nebraska =

Segment of American highway

U.S. Highway 385
- Gold Rush Byway
- US 385 highlighted in red

Route information
- Maintained by NDOT
- Length: 180.36 mi (290.26 km)
- Existed: 1958–present
- Tourist routes: Gold Rush Byway

Major junctions
- South end: US 385 west of Julesburg, CO
- I-80 / US 30 in Chappell; US 30 / L-17J in Sidney; N-92 near Broadwater; US 26 / N-88 / N-92 in Bridgeport; N-2 in Alliance; US 20 in Chadron
- North end: US 385 / SD 79 near Chadron

Location
- Country: United States
- State: Nebraska
- Counties: Deuel, Cheyenne, Morrill, Box Butte, Dawes

Highway system
- United States Numbered Highway System; List; Special; Divided; Nebraska State Highway System; Interstate; US; State; Link; Spur; State Spurs; Recreation
← N-370	→ I-480

U.S. Route 385 (US 385) is a part of the United States Numbered Highway System that travels from Big Bend National Park in Texas to US 85 in Deadwood, South Dakota. Within the state of Nebraska, the highway is known as the Gold Rush Byway, one of nine scenic byways across the state. The highway follows along the old Sidney-Black Hills trail which played a crucial role during the Black Hills Gold Rush in the late 1870s. It served as the primary route to transport gold and mining gear between Sidney, Nebraska and the Black Hills to the north. Today, the highway enters Nebraska in the southeastern portion of the Nebraska Panhandle on the state line with Colorado northeast of Julesburg and continues in a northerly direction to the South Dakota state line north of Chadron.

US 385 was an original entry in the initial development of the US Highway System in 1926. It originally ran from Comfort, Texas to Raton, New Mexico and did not come near Nebraska. In 1935, most of the routing of US 385 was resigned as US 87. The current incarnation of US 385 was commissioned in 1959 bringing the highway into Nebraska along the new alignment that stretched from Big Bend all the way to Deadwood, South Dakota in the Black Hills.

== Route description ==
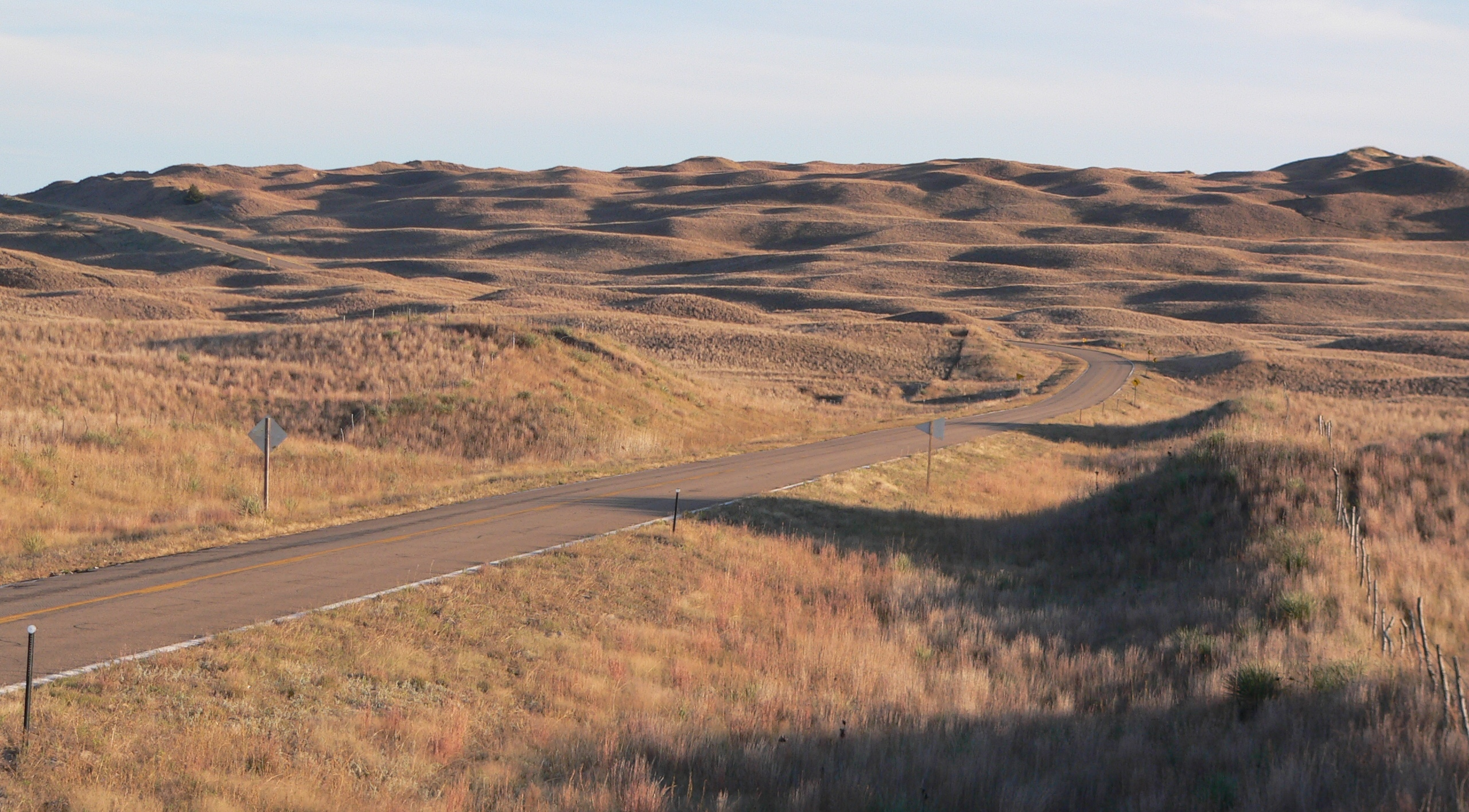
The Nebraska Sandhills

=== Colorado to Bridgeport ===
US 385 enters Nebraska on the Colorado state line northwest of Julesburg, Colorado. Traveling to the northwest through agricultural fields and alongside Lodgepole Creek, the highway passes beneath I-80 just before it enters the small city of Chappell. The highway has a connection to I-80 south of town via Link 25A. Here, the highway meets up with US 30, the Lincoln Highway, running concurrently with it for about 25 miles to the northwest passing through Lodgepole before turning west and passing through the small communities of Sunol and Colton. At the highway approaches Sidney, US 385 breaks off from US 30 and turns north along the east side of Sidney.

After departing Sidney, US 385 travels north as it begins its trek into the vast agricultural fields of the rural Nebraska Panhandle. A couple miles north of Sidney, the highway comes alongside the BNSF Railway which it runs parallel with for the next eighty miles with a few deviations. Continuing north through the small towns of Gurley and Dalton the landscape takes on a bit of change as the highway approaches somewhat rugged terrain as it descends 400 feet (120 m) into the North Platte River Valley. As US 385 approaches the North Platte River it joins up with N-92, the state's longest highway. Here, it takes a westerly turn towards Bridgeport, a town which takes its name from the Camp Clarke Bridge constructed in 1876 three miles to the west.

As the highway approaches Bridgeport from the south it joins up with US 26 to cross the North Platte River. On the south side of town, US 26 continues to the west where it passes Chimney Rock National Historic Site just twelve miles down the road. Continuing north across the river the two highways diverge, with US 26 heading east towards Broadwater and Ogallala while US 385 resumes its northward heading. For a brief few miles the roadway is, again, surrounded by agricultural fields, brought to life with center pivot irrigation north of Bridgeport. The highway transitions into slightly rugged terrain as it climbs back up, 400 feet, out of the valley.

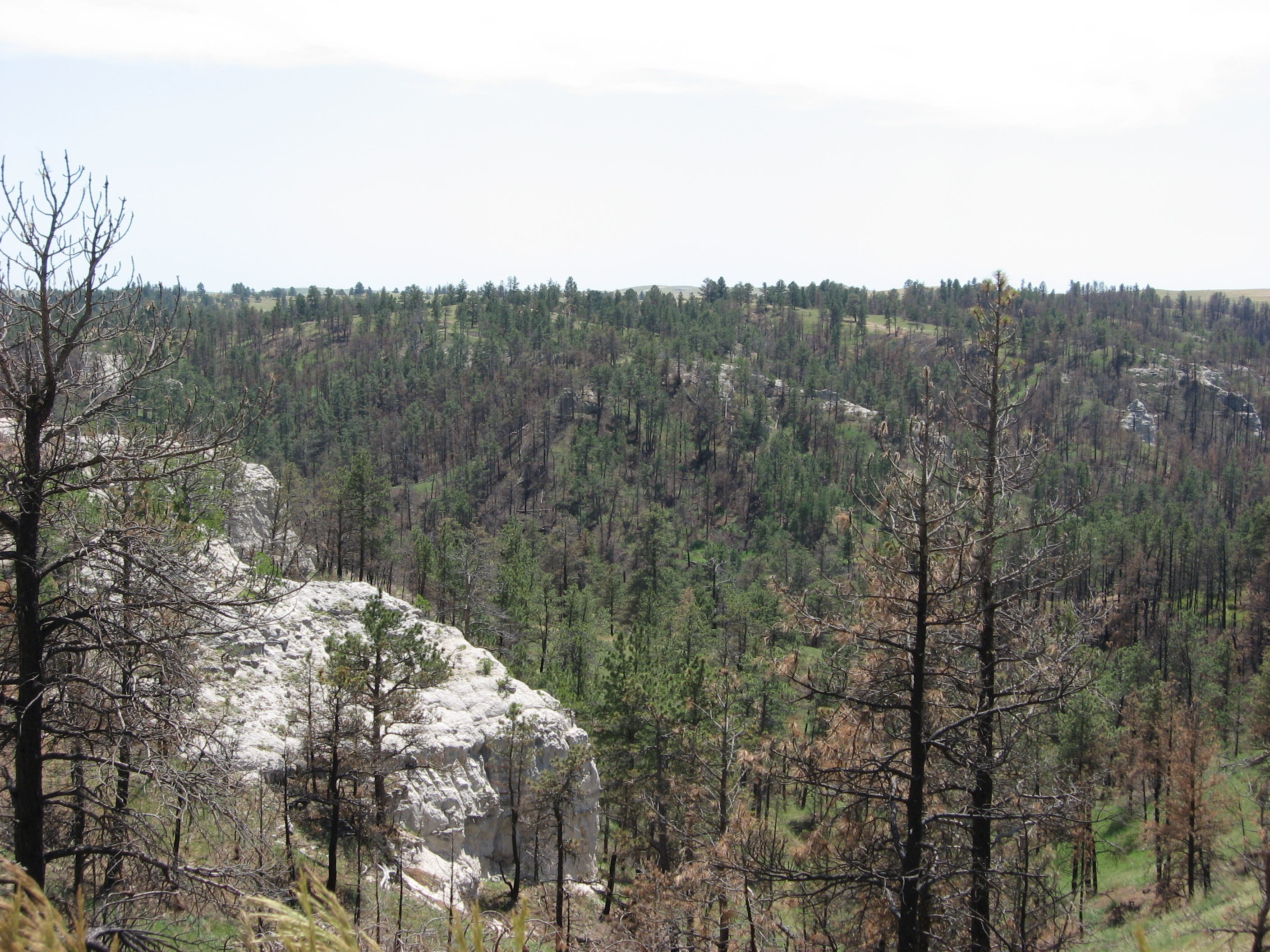
The Pine Ridge Escarpment with Ponderosa Pines

=== Bridgeport to South Dakota ===
The highway comes to a junction with Link 62A north of Bridgeport. Here, the Heartland Expressway joins US 385 from the west, a high priority corridor between Denver and Rapid City, South Dakota. Just a couple miles after this junction, the highway quickly passes through the unincorporated community of Angora. As the highway continues northeast from here, it enters the western reaches of the Nebraska Sandhills for about fifteen miles before it arrives in Alliance to meet up with N-2 just west of a large BNSF railyard. Alliance is home to Carhenge, a replica of England's Stonehenge constructed with vintage American automobiles. The concurrent highways leave Alliance to the northwest and after a few miles diverge. US 385 turns to the north, while N-2 continues to the northwest, taking the BNSF railway with it. As US 385 continues north it passes through additional spotty portions of the sandhills as it travels over forty miles without encountering any towns.

South of Chadron the highway passes through Chadron State Park in the Pine Ridge Ranger District of the Nebraska National Forest. This area is part of an escarpment that lies between the Niobrara and White Rivers. Forested buttes, ridges and canyons have been carved into the high tableland. Sharing similarities with the Black Hills, the area is forested with Ponderosa Pine and contains a variation of wildlife such as bighorn sheep, elk, and mule deer, which are not common elsewhere in the state. The highway then enters Chadron where it joins US 20 along the west side of the city. It runs concurrently with US 20 to the west for two miles before departing to the north. US 385 then passes the Chadron Municipal Airport before turning to the northwest where it reaches the South Dakota state line. From there it continues north into the Black Hills towards Deadwood, South Dakota.

== History ==
=== Black Hills gold rush ===
US 385 travels south to north through the Nebraska Panhandle which has been part of the state since it was acquired in 1803 as part of the vast Louisiana Purchase. Much of inland Nebraska, including the Panhandle became important regions for overland travel via horse and wagon. This included the California, Mormon, and Oregon trails as well as the Pony Express route which passed through the region. Settlers to Nebraska were mostly farmers, but the discovery of gold in Wyoming in 1859 sent a rush of speculators westward across the state.

In 1874, during the Black Hills Expedition led by Lieutenant Colonel George Armstrong Custer, the discovery of gold in the region sparked the Black Hills Gold Rush. As prospectors located valuable sources of gold along Deadwood and Whitewood Creeks, thousands more prospectors entered the area looking to stake their claim. In April, 1876, a gold outcropping was discovered near Lead, South Dakota. This gold claim became the Homestake Mine and was the primary source of the placer gold being mined from the surrounding area. Over the next century, ten percent of the world's gold supply would come from this site.

Sidney, Nebraska became an important city during the gold rush. It was an optimal starting point for gold prospectors. It was adjacent to the Union Pacific Railroad and on established trails from the east, as well as to the north via the Sidney-Black Hills Trail. The trail was also preferred as it was shorter and through less treacherous terrain than trails to the west. The construction of Camp Clarke Bridge over the North Platte River in 1876, three miles west of modern-day Bridgeport also boosted its appeal. This allowed prospectors and freight to arrive via rail and continue north into the Black Hills with relative ease. The bridge contained sixty-one wooden trusses and spanned nearly 2,000 feet (610 m). Tolls ranged between $2 and $6 per wagon and up to $10 for heavy freight wagons.

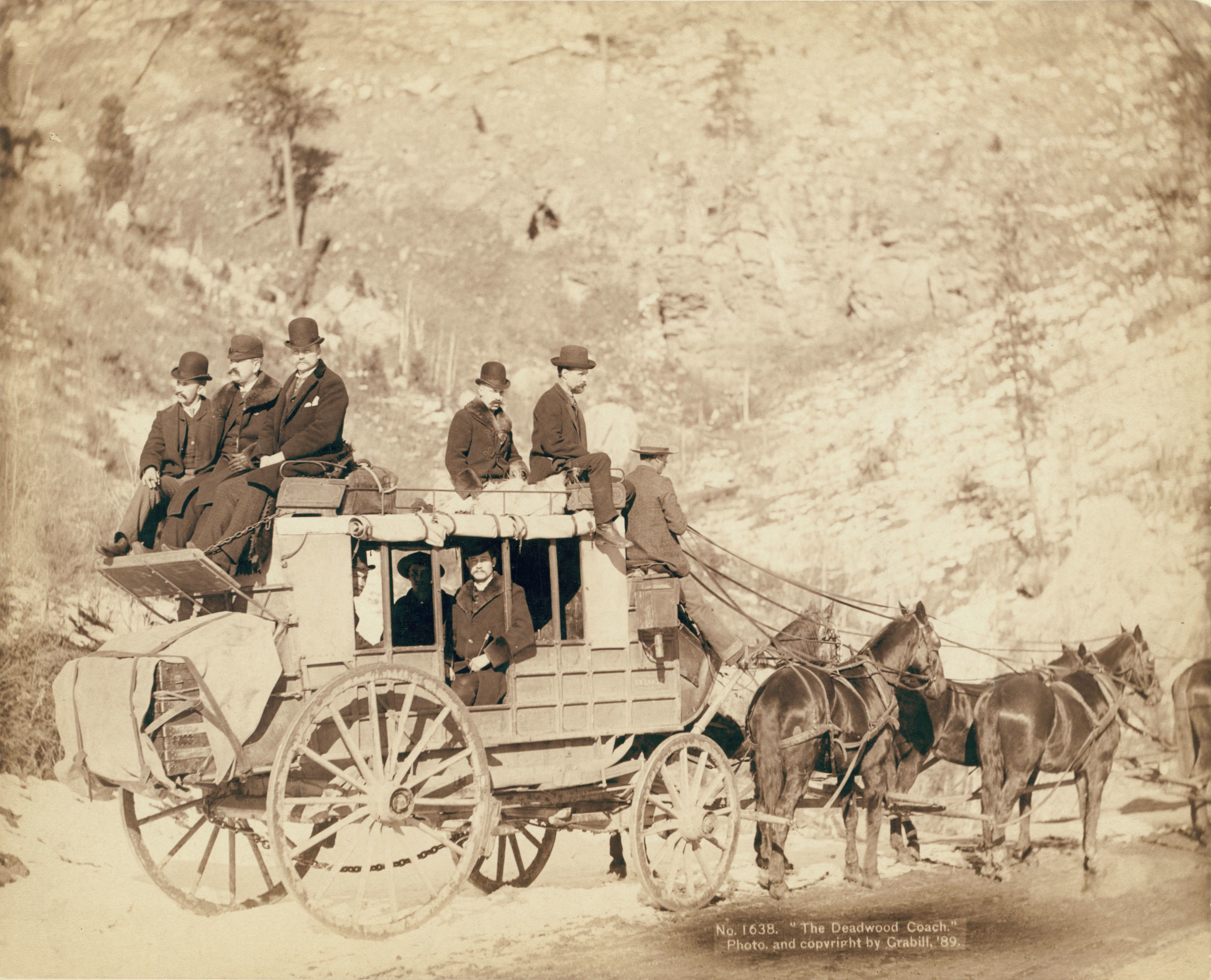
Concord type stagecoach typically used on the trail

While prospectors flooded the area, along with them came those who would service the nascent mining industry. This included stagecoach lines that traveled between Sidney and the Black Hills carrying freight and passengers. Sometimes stagecoaches would depart Sidney for Deadwood three times each day. Conditions on the stagecoaches were usually cramped as upwards of sixteen people could be carried at a time. Between 1874 and 1880 most of the supplies and freight coming to and from the gold camps traveled this trail. Thousands of stagecoaches and wagons are estimated to have traveled the route during this time. At the peak of the gold rush in 1878 and 1879, fifty to seventy-five freight wagons left Sidney every day and an estimated 22-million pounds of freight traveled along the trail.

Each week, gold was shipped out of the Black Hills to Sidney, sometimes with daily loads approaching $200,000 in value (equivalent to $5.69 million in 2024). It was during this time that stagecoach robberies became frequent occurrences. This became such a problem that the Gilmer and Salisbury stage lines manager, Luke Voorhees, attempted to capture the bandits to prevent loss of business along the route. When that wasn't enough, in 1878, he enlisted the help of Concord stagecoach builders, Abbot-Downing Company, to manufacture an armored stagecoach to withstand attacks. These armored stagecoaches were lined with half inch steel, portholes for windows and outfitted with an 800-pound steel safe accompanied by six to eight armed guards. Throughout three years of service, the armored stagecoach, nicknamed "Old Ironsides" was only robbed once.

In 1880, a railroad between Chicago and Pierre, South Dakota severely damaged the freight business in Sidney. As the faster northerly route became preferred, freight companies moved their business to Pierre, mostly returning Sidney to the quieter times before the Gold Rush.

=== Predecessor highways ===
Most of the US 385 corridor was defined by the trails created during the Gold Rush, especially north of Sidney. Prior to the designation of US 385 in 1958 the route was covered by a combination of existing state highways. N-27 ran from the Colorado state line to Chappell where it met up with US 30. From there, US 30 carried the route west to Sidney then departed the city to the north along N-19. N-19 then continued along the rest of the modern day route north to the South Dakota state line passing through Bridgeport, Alliance, and Chadron.

== Future ==
=== Heartland Expressway ===
US 385 north of Link 62A east of Scottsbluff is part of the federally designated high priority corridor titled the Heartland Expressway that connects Rapid City, South Dakota with Denver, Colorado via improved four-lane divided highways. The Heartland Expressway is a portion of a high priority international corridor between Monterrey, Nuevo León, Mexico and Saskatoon, Saskatchewan, Canada called the Ports-to-Plains Corridor. This international corridor is made up of three high priority systems, of which the Heartland Expressway is one. The other two systems include the Theodore Roosevelt Expressway between Rapid City and Saskatoon and The Ports-to-Plains Corridor between Monterrey and Denver. Together, the systems complete an international trade corridor between the United States, Mexico, and Canada. Portions of the Heartland Expressway in Colorado and South Dakota are already complete, however progress has been slow in Nebraska. Prior to 2016, no portion of US 385 had been upgraded to four lanes in Nebraska, however portions of the expressway along US 26 between Morrill and Minatare as well as N-71 south of Scottsbluff to I-80 are upgraded to four-lane divided highway.

==== Nebraska Link 62A to Alliance ====
In 2015, the environmental assessment for the section of US 385 between Link 62A and Alliance was approved by the Federal Highway Administration. This 24.75 miles (39.83 km) segment would be constructed in three portions, the first of which got underway in 2016 and involved the stretch of US 385 between Alliance to 9 miles (14 km) south of town at an estimated cost of $23,655,000. The second segment would cover the section of US 385 between Link 62A and the first segment south of Alliance. This 14.2 miles (22.9 km) portion of the project is slated for construction in 2018 at a cost of $31,182,000. The third portion of this segment would involve construction of a sweeping curve between Link 62A and the newly upgraded US 385.

==== Alliance to Chadron ====
Original plans for the Heartland Expressway called for divided four-lane highways throughout, however the high cost of construction through 59 miles (95 km) of mostly rural area made the project cost prohibitive to be built at that standard. In September, 2016 Nebraska Governor Pete Ricketts announced $300 million in transportation projects to be funded via the Build Nebraska Act and the Transportation Innovation Act. Of the projects included, the US 385 corridor between Alliance and Chadron was slated for design work. Rather than planning to construct this corridor as a four-lane divided highway, it will instead be planned as a Super 2 design at a projected cost of $89 million.

== Major intersections ==
County	Location	mi	km	Destinations	Notes
Deuel	Swan Precinct	0.00	0.00	US 385 south / California National Historic Trail / Pony Express National Historic Trail – Julesburg	Continuation into Colorado
Deuel	Swan Precinct	7.87	12.67	L-25A south to I-80	
Deuel	Chappell	8.26	13.29	US 30 east (Lincoln Highway east) – Ogallala	Southern terminus of US 30 concurrency
Cheyenne	Lodgepole	17.32	27.87	L-17F south to I-80	
Cheyenne	Sunol	24.50	39.43	L-17E south to I-80	
Cheyenne	Sidney	34.00	54.72	US 30 west to L-17J south / I-80	Northern terminus of US 30 concurrency
Morrill	East Camp Clark Precinct	65.78	105.86	N-92 east – Oshkosh	Southern terminus of N-92 concurrency
Morrill	Bridgeport	73.44	118.19	N-88 south – Courthouse and Jail Rocks	
Morrill	Bridgeport	73.91	118.95	US 26 west / N-92 west / California National Historic Trail / Pony Express National Historic Trail – Scottsbluff	Southern terminus of US 26 concurrency; northern terminus of N-92 concurrency
Morrill	Bridgeport	74.91	120.56	US 26 east – Oshkosh, North Platte	Northern terminus of US 26 concurrency
Morrill	Haynes Precinct	84.84	136.54	L-62A west to US 26 – Scottsbluff	
Box Butte	Alliance	108.99	175.40	N-2 east (3rd Street)	Southern terminus of N-2 concurrency
Box Butte	Box Butte-Wright Lake Precinct	116.92	188.16	N-2 west – Hemingford, Crawford	Northern terminus of N-2 concurrency
Box Butte	Dorsey Precinct	125.80	202.46	L-7E – Hemingford	
Dawes	Precinct 7	134.90	217.10	Box Butte State Recreation Area Road (Dunlap Road)	To Box Butte Reservoir State Recreation Area
Dawes	Chadron	161.62	260.10	US 20 east (Bridges to Buttes Byway)	Southern terminus of US 20 concurrency
Dawes	Precinct 2	163.80	263.61	US 20 west – Crawford	Northern terminus of US 20 concurrency; southbound access via unsigned L-23D
Dawes	Precinct 6	180.36	290.26	US 385 north / SD 79 north (Heartland Expressway) – Hot Springs, Rapid City	Continuation into South Dakota
1.000 mi = 1.609 km; 1.000 km = 0.621 mi: Concurrency terminus

== See also ==
U.S. Route 385
Previous state: Colorado	Nebraska	Next state: South Dakota
