= N29 =

N29 may refer to:

- HMS Proteus (N29), a submarine of the Royal Navy
- Jalan Terachi–Seri Menanti, a road in Malaysia
- London Buses route N29
- N29 road (Belgium), a National Road in Belgium
- N29 road (Ireland)
- Nebraska Highway 29, in the United States
- Route nationale 29
