= Nebraska Highway 92 =

State highway in Nebraska, U.S.

State Highway 92

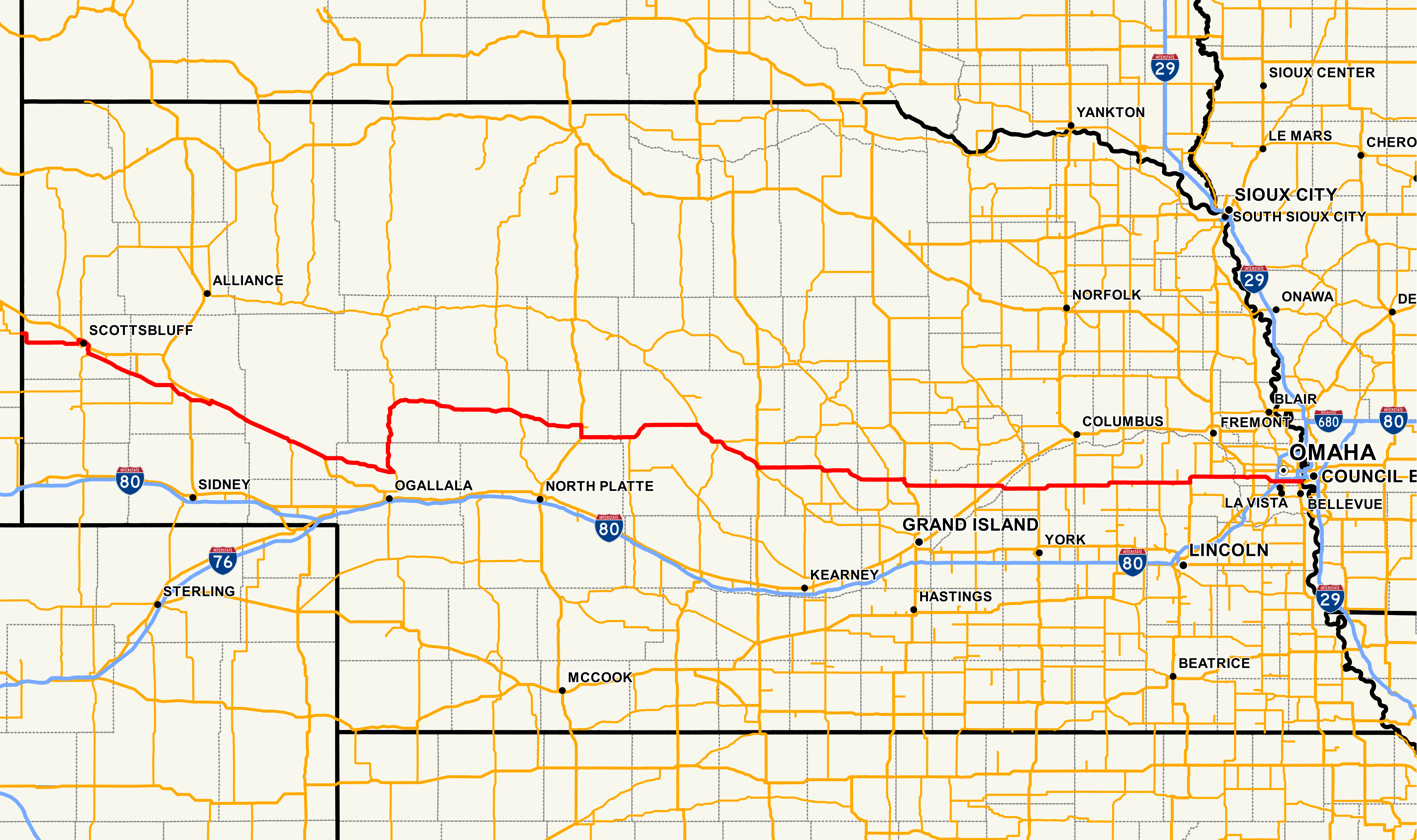
- Nebraska Highway 92 highlighted in red

Route information
- Maintained by NDOT
- Length: 489.46 mi (787.71 km)

Major junctions
- West end: WYO 92 west of Lyman
- US 26 in Melbeta; US 385 west of Broadwater; US 83 east of Stapleton; US 183 in Ansley; US 281 in St. Paul; US 30 southwest of Clarks; US 77 west of Wahoo; US 275 south of Waterloo; I-80 in Omaha; US 75 in Omaha
- East end: US 275 / Iowa 92 at Missouri River in Omaha

Location
- Country: United States
- State: Nebraska
- Counties: Scotts Bluff, Morrill, Garden, Keith, Arthur, McPherson, Logan, Custer, Sherman, Howard, Merrick, Polk, Butler, Saunders, Douglas

Highway system
- Nebraska State Highway System; Interstate; US; State; Link; Spur; State Spurs; Recreation
← N-91	→ N-94

Nebraska Highway 92 is a highway that enters the state from Nebraska's western border at the Wyoming state line west of Lyman, Nebraska, to the state's eastern border on the South Omaha Veterans Memorial Bridge over the Missouri River in Omaha, where it enters Iowa. Nebraska Highway 92 passes, follows, or runs through a number of the state's principal attractions, including Scotts Bluff National Monument, the Oregon Trail, Chimney Rock National Historic Site, Ash Hollow State Historical Park, Lake McConaughy, the Nebraska Sand Hills, and the City of Omaha. Nebraska Highway 92 is the longest state route in the state at a total of 489.1 miles (787.1 km), and is part of a continuous 886-mile (1,426 km) four-state "Highway 92" which begins in Torrington, Wyoming, goes through Nebraska and Iowa and ends in La Moille, Illinois. It is the only Nebraska Highway to run from the west border to the east border of Nebraska; along the way it crosses the Platte River or its tributary North Platte River a total of five times.

== Route description ==
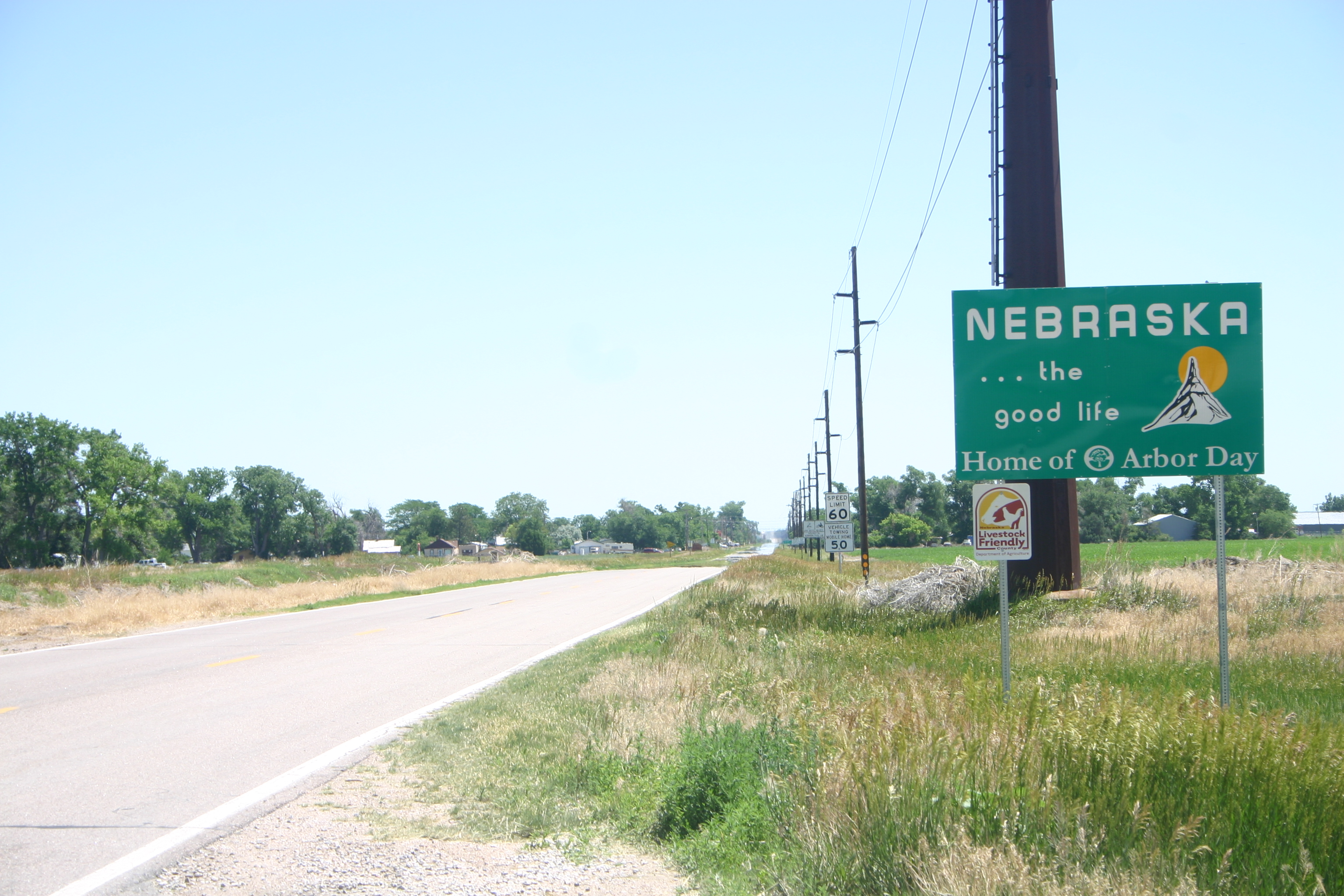
Sign on N-92 as it enters the state from Wyoming

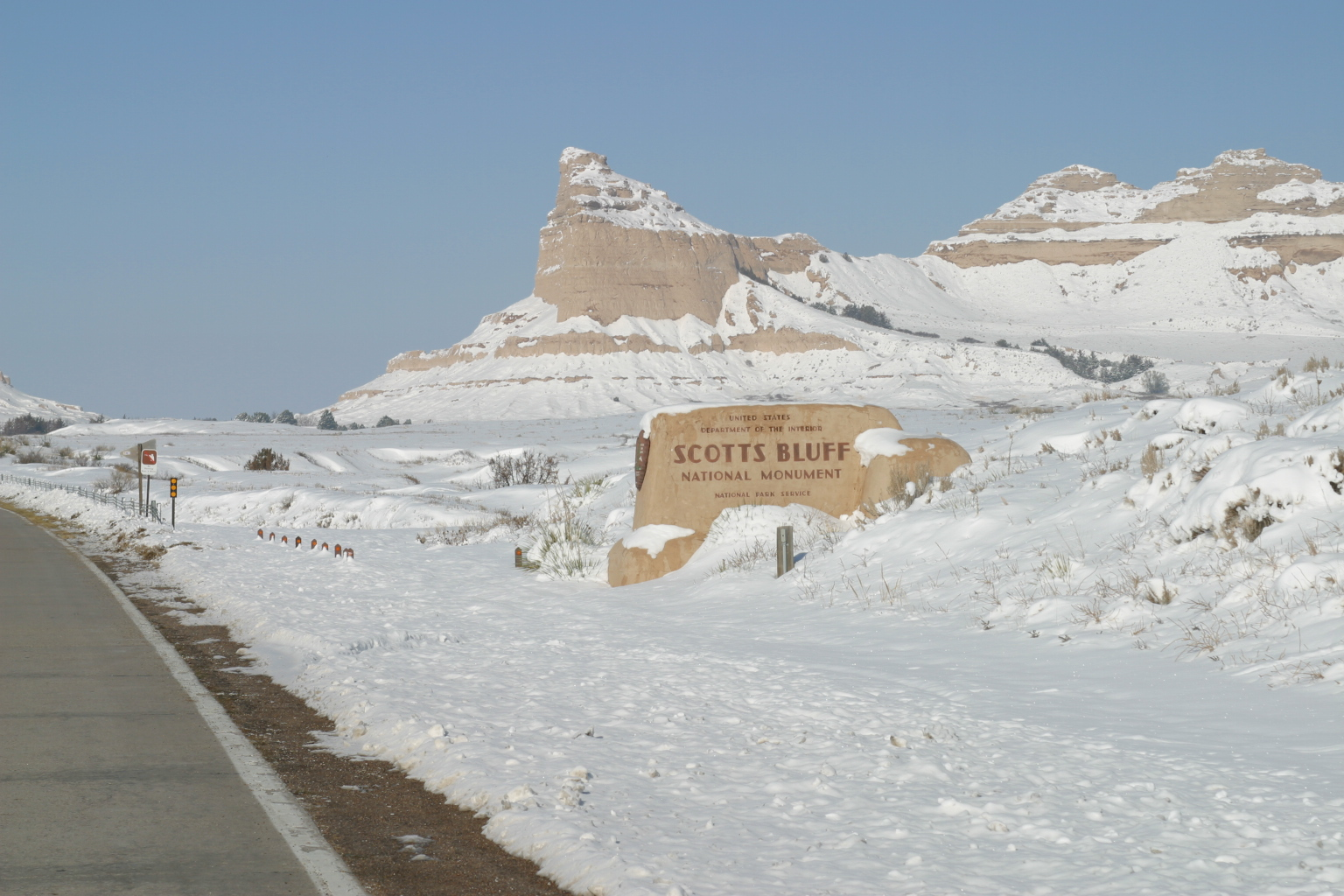
Scotts Bluff National Monument. The road is the Oregon Trail, a former alignment of N-92

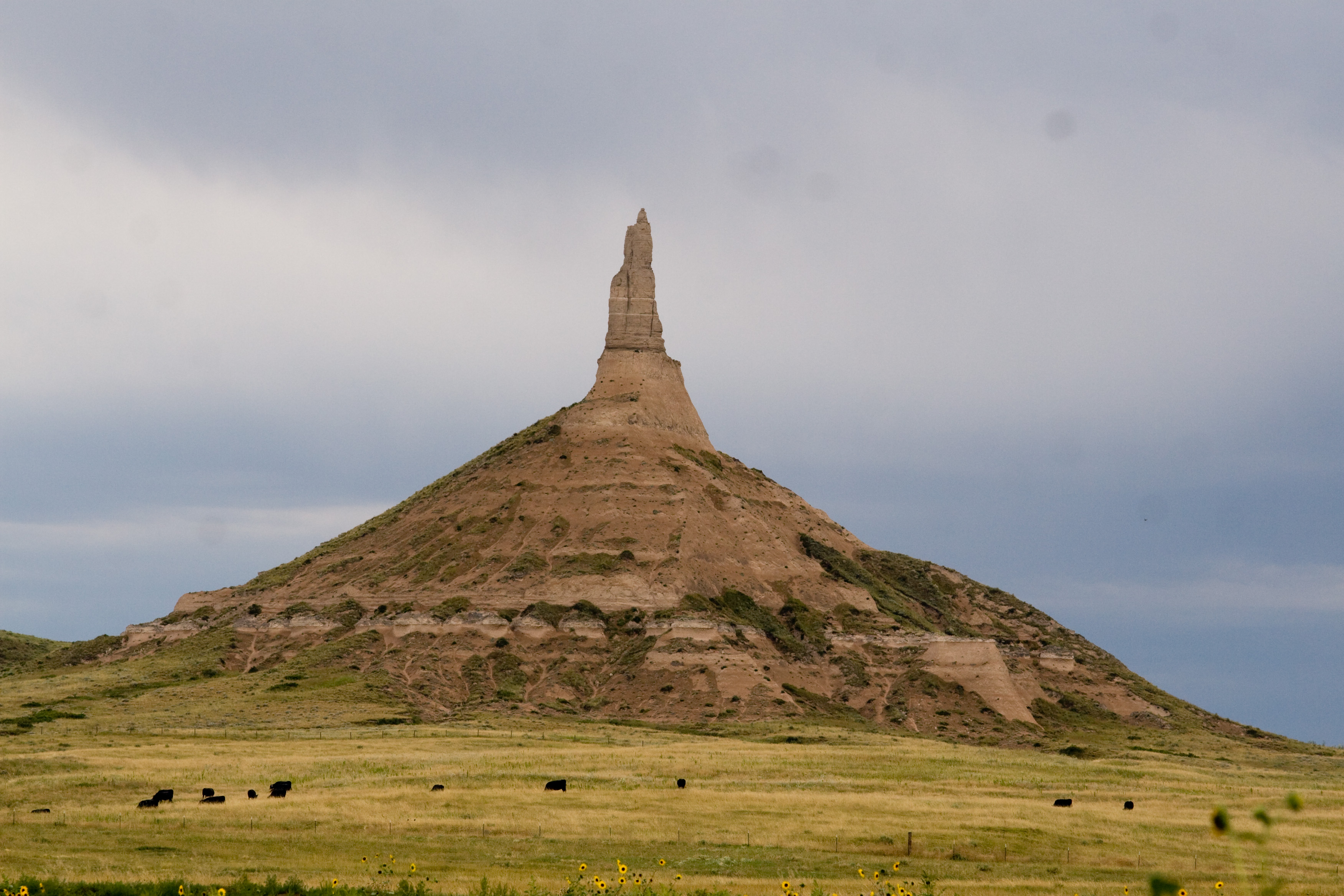
Chimney Rock, a landmark on N-92

N-92 begins at the Wyoming border west of Lyman and after a brief turn south, heads east passing around the north side of Scotts Bluff National Monument, crosses the North Platte River for the first of three times, and enters the town of Scottsbluff. Starting in Scottsbluff, N-92, US 26, and the North Platte River form a three-way braid, crisscrossing one another several times for 91 miles (146 km) until Lewellen. At Scottsbluff, it overlaps US 26 and N-71, crossing the North Platte River again to its south side, to Gering, where it then turns to the east-southeast, following the route of the Oregon Trail, paralleling the North Platte River and US 26 on the other side of the river. Near Chimney Rock National Historic Site, it overlaps US 26 again until Bridgeport. After a brief concurrency with US 385, it goes southeast until it crosses the North Platte for the third time just before Broadwater. It then again overlaps US 26 a third time from there until Lewellen, where it separates to go through the resort communities along the north shore of Lake McConaughy until it meets N-61.

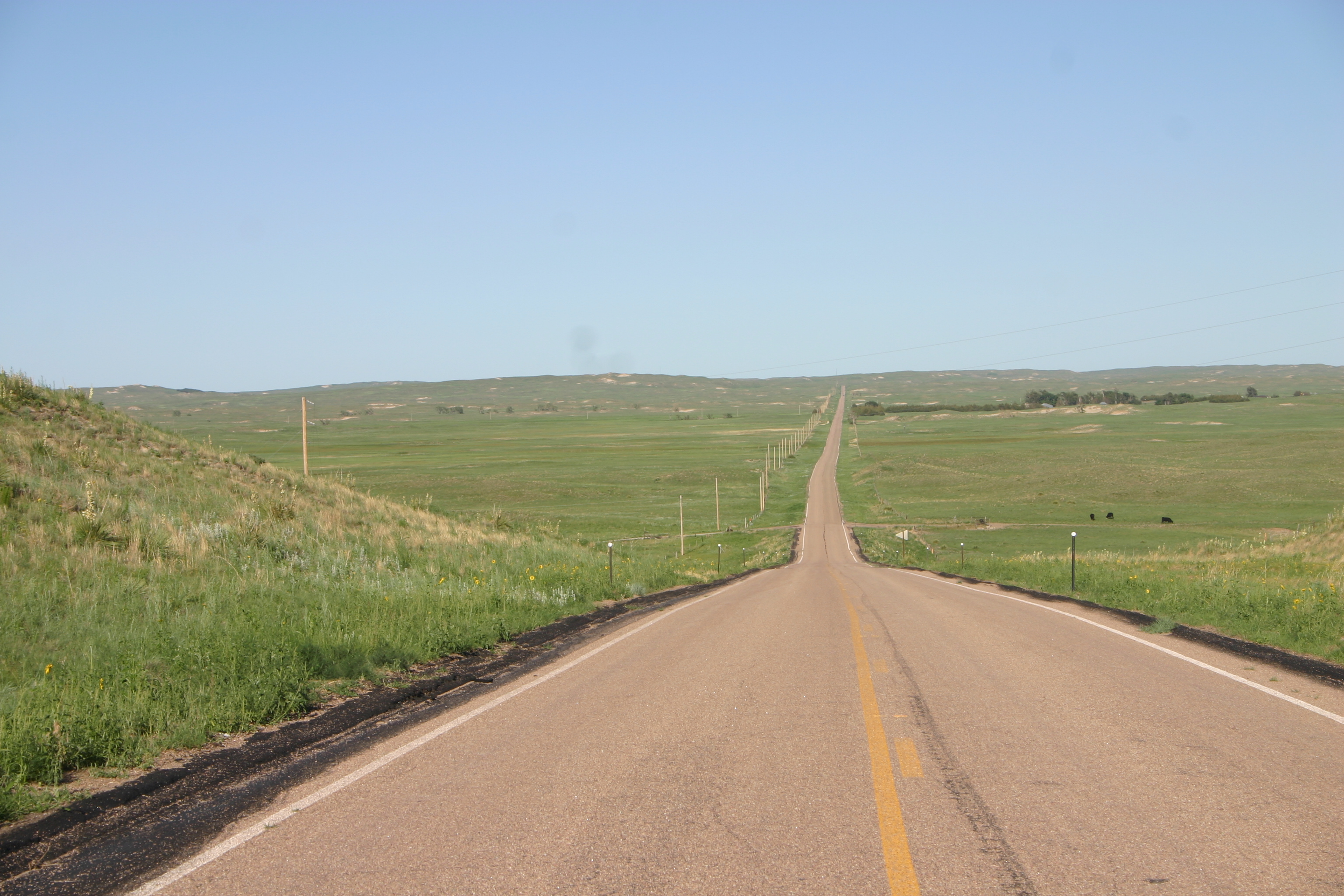
N-92 in the Sandhills, between Arthur and Tryon

It overlaps Highway 61 and goes north into the Sand Hills and separates in Arthur. It then goes east, meeting N-97 in Tryon, and encountering N-2 at Merna. It then goes southeast with Highway 2 through Broken Bow and separates at Ansley. It then runs east through Loup City and meets with US 281 in St. Paul.

It runs concurrently with US 281 through St. Paul, crosses the Loup River, and then separates from US 281 and goes straight east, intersects US 30, crosses the Platte River for the first of two times near Clarks and meets US 81 west of Osceola. It is then concurrent with US 81 through Osceola and Shelby, before separating east of Shelby. It then passes through Rising City and then goes straight east until it meets US 77 southwest of Wahoo, Nebraska. It passes through Wahoo concurrent with US 77 and goes east with US 77 until they separate near Mead. After passing the south edge of Yutan, it recrosses the Platte River.

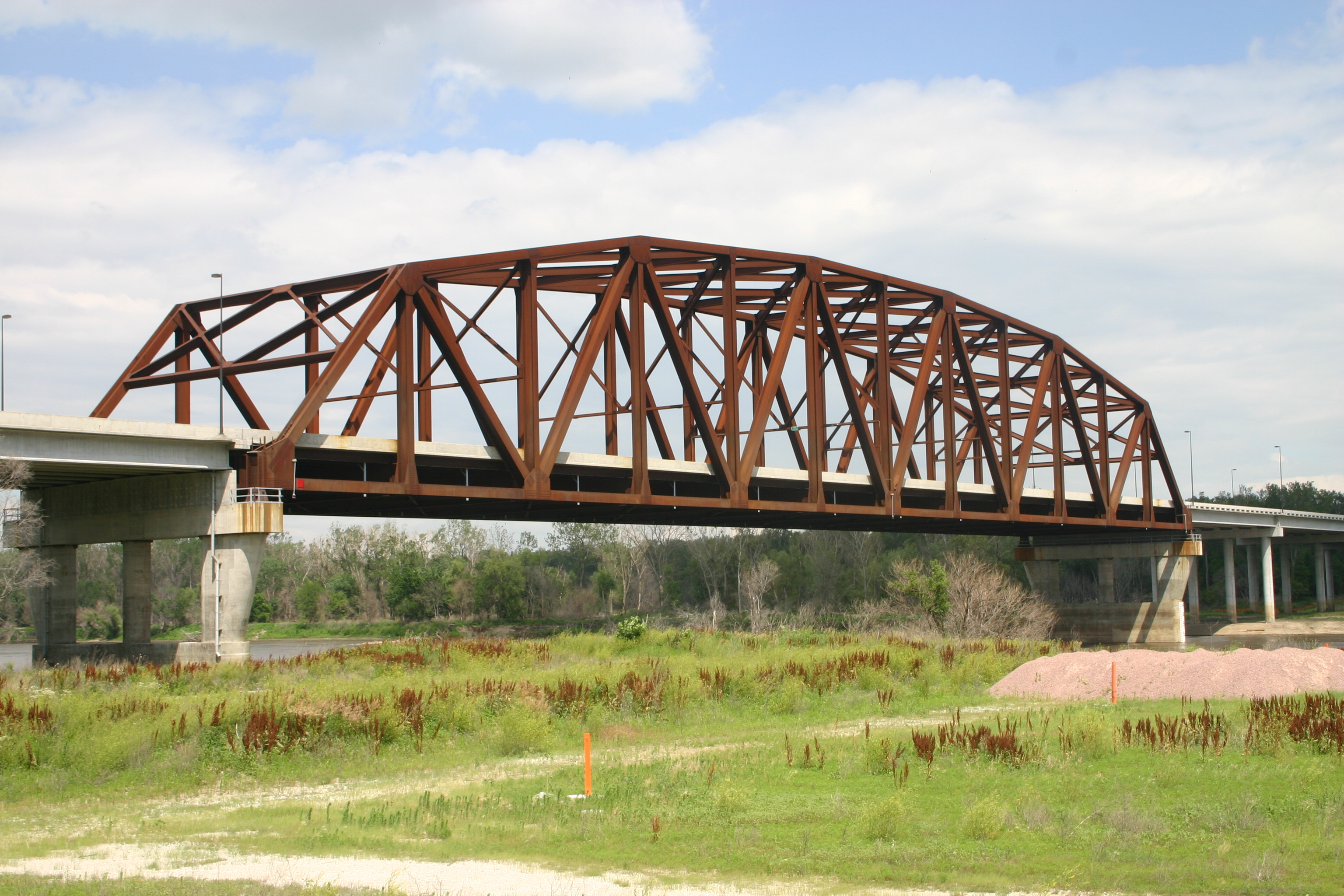
View of new South Omaha Veterans Memorial Bridge, from the Nebraska side

It then encounters US 275, with which it is concurrent for the rest of its distance in Nebraska. Shortly after meeting US 275, it crosses the Elkhorn River and becomes a 4 lane divided expressway shortly before meeting US 6 and N-31. Within Omaha, it meets Interstate 80 and US 75. The street designations for N-92 in Omaha, going west to east, are West Center Road, Industrial Road, L Street and Missouri Avenue. It remains a four-lane suburban arterial street until it enters Iowa on the South Omaha Veterans Memorial Bridge over the Missouri River.

== History ==
Originally, Route 92 followed the route of the old Oregon Trail through Mitchell Pass in Scotts Bluff National Monument, and then through Downtown Gering. It was later rerouted on a more level route around the north side of Scotts Bluff, through the town of Scottsbluff. Between 1936 and 1973, Nebraska Highway 92 was concurrent with U.S. Highway 30A from Clarks to Omaha.

== Major intersections ==
County	Location	mi	km	Destinations	Notes
Scotts Bluff	Lyman	0.00	0.00	WYO 92 west – Torrington	Continuation into Wyoming
Scotts Bluff	Scottsbluff	23.16	37.27	US 26 west	Western end of US 26 overlap
Scotts Bluff	Scottsbluff	23.78	38.27	N-71 north	Western end of N-71 overlap
Scotts Bluff	Scottsbluff	27.19	43.76	US 26 east	Eastern end of US 26 overlap
Scotts Bluff		27.76	44.68	South Beltline Highway – Scottsbluff	Partial interchange; westbound exit only
Scotts Bluff	Gering	29.92	48.15	N-71 south	Interchange; eastern end of N-71 overlap
Scotts Bluff	Melbeta	36.18	58.23	L-79E north	
Morrill	Bayard	47.23	76.01	US 26 west	Western end of US 26 overlap
Morrill	Bridgeport	59.76	96.17	US 26 east / US 385 north (M Street)	Eastern end of US 26 overlap; western end of US 385 overlap
Morrill	Bridgeport	60.23	96.93	N-88 south (M Street)	Northern terminus of N-88
Morrill		67.89	109.26	US 385 south	Eastern end of US 385 overlap
Morrill	Broadwater	75.91	122.17	US 26 west (Guthrie Street)	Western end of US 26 overlap
Garden	Oshkosh	105.47	169.74	N-27 south	Northern terminus of N-27 (middle segment)
Garden	Lewellen	118.31	190.40	US 26 east	Eastern end of US 26 overlap
Keith	Lemoyne	142.06	228.62	N-61 south	Western end of N-61 overlap
Arthur	Arthur	167.51	269.58	N-61 north	Eastern end of N-61 overlap
McPherson	Tryon	206.70	332.65	N-97 north	Western end of N-97 overlap
McPherson		211.17	339.85	N-97 south	Eastern end of N-97 overlap
Logan	Stapleton	232.17	373.64	US 83 north	Western end of US 83 overlap
Logan		236.17	380.08	US 83 south	Eastern end of US 83 overlap
Custer	Arnold	252.28	406.01	N-40 east (Carroll Street)	Western terminus of N-40
Custer	Merna	276.45	444.90	N-2 west (E Street)	Western end of N-2 overlap
Custer	Broken Bow	285.72	459.82	N-21 south (8th Avenue)	Northern terminus of N-21
Custer	Broken Bow	286.89	461.70	N-70 east	Western terminus of N-70
Custer	Ansley	302.37	486.62	US 183 south / N-2 east	Eastern end of N-2 overlap; western end of US 183 overlap
Custer	Ansley	302.77	487.26	US 183 north	Eastern end of US 183 overlap
Sherman	Loup City	323.07	519.93	N-58 north	Western end of N-58 overlap
Sherman	Loup City	323.79	521.09	R-82B east (O Street) / N-10 south – Sherman Reservoir State Recreation Area	Northern terminus of N-10; western terminus of R-82B
Sherman	Loup City	326.04	524.71	N-58 south	Eastern end of N-58 overlap
Howard		343.35	552.57	S-47A south	
Howard		347.10	558.60	N-11 (Naper Road)	
Howard	St. Paul	352.56	567.39	US 281 north	Western end of US 281 overlap
Howard	St. Paul	354.94	571.22	US 281 south	Eastern end of US 281 overlap
Merrick		364.55	586.69	S-61A	
Merrick		377.50	607.53	N-14 south	Western end of N-14 overlap
Merrick		378.51	609.15	N-14 north (17th Road)	Eastern end of N-14 overlap
Merrick		384.28	618.44	US 30 – Columbus, Grand Island	One-quadrant interchange; access via unsigned L-61D
Polk		396.02	637.33	N-39 north	Southern terminus of N-39
Polk		399.02	642.16	US 81 south (Center Road) – York	Western end of US 81 overlap
Polk	Shelby	408.42	657.29	N-69 south (Walnut Street)	Northern terminus of N-69
Polk–Butler county line		411.44	662.15	US 81 north – Columbus	Eastern end of US 81 overlap
Butler		414.42	666.94	S-12E south	
Butler		424.40	683.01	N-15 north (Mn Road)	Western end of N-15 overlap
Butler		425.92	685.45	N-15 south (Road O)	Eastern end of N-15 overlap
Butler		430.91	693.48	S-12F south	
Saunders		439.92	707.98	N-79 south	Western end of N-79 overlap
Saunders		440.94	709.62	N-79 north	Eastern end of N-79 overlap
Saunders		444.45	715.27	S-78D south	
Saunders		445.95	717.69	S-78E north	
Saunders		450.17	724.48	US 77 south – Lincoln	Western end of US 77 overlap
Saunders	Wahoo	453.58	729.97	N-109 north	Southern terminus of N-109
Saunders		458.79	738.35	US 77 north – Fremont	Eastern end of US 77 overlap
Saunders		459.80	739.98	S-78F south	
Platte River		465.99	749.94	Bridge	
Douglas		469.80	756.07	US 275 west (240th Street) – Omaha (via Dodge Street), Fremont	Western end of US 275 overlap; former US 30A east
Douglas	Omaha	472.84	760.96	US 6 / N-31 (204th Street) – Gretna, Elkhorn	Interchange
Douglas	Omaha	479.36	771.46	132nd Street / Millard Avenue (N-50 south) to I-80	Northern terminus of N-50
Douglas	Omaha	480.83	773.82	I-680 north / I-80	Cloverleaf interchange with I-80 C/D lanes; I-80 exit 445; I-680 south exit 1
Douglas	Omaha	483.35	777.88	N-85 south (84th Street)	Northern terminus of N-85
Douglas	Omaha	484.35	779.49	72nd Street	Interchange
Douglas	Omaha	488.17	785.63	US 75 (Kennedy Freeway) to I-80	Interchange
Missouri River		489.46	787.71	South Omaha Veterans Memorial Bridge; Nebraska–Iowa line	
Missouri River		489.46	787.71	US 275 south / Iowa 92 east (Veterans Memorial Highway)	Continuation into Iowa
1.000 mi = 1.609 km; 1.000 km = 0.621 mi: Concurrency terminus; Incomplete access
