= U.S. Route 26 in Nebraska =

Section of U.S. Highway in Nebraska, United States

U.S. Highway 26
- US-26 highlighted in red

Route information
- Maintained by NDOT
- Length: 150.79 mi (242.67 km)

Major junctions
- West end: US 26 at the Wyoming state line in Henry
- N-71 at Scottsbluff; US 385 at Bridgeport; N-27 at Oshkosh; N-61 at Ogallala; US 30 at Ogallala
- East end: I-80 / N-61 at Ogallala

Location
- Country: United States
- State: Nebraska
- Counties: Sioux, Scotts Bluff, Morrill, Garden, Keith

Highway system
- United States Numbered Highway System; List; Special; Divided; Nebraska State Highway System; Interstate; US; State; Link; Spur; State Spurs; Recreation
← N-25	→ N-27

U.S. Highway 26 (US-26) is an east–west highway in western Nebraska. It enters the state from Wyoming just west of Henry. The eastern terminus of US-26 is in Ogallala at an interchange with Interstate 80 (I-80). The highway largely parallels the North Platte River for the majority of its route in Nebraska and as such, runs at a northwest–southeast angle. The highway also parallels the original paths of the Oregon, California, and Mormon trails.

== Route description ==
US-26 enters Nebraska from Wyoming and shortly thereafter enters Henry. After passing through Morrill, US-26 becomes a divided highway. At Mitchell, US-26 meets Nebraska Highway 29 (N‑29). Continuing southeast, US-26 enters Scottsbluff. Through Scottsbluff, US-26 runs concurrent with N‑71 and N‑92 on a highway which goes through northern Scottsbluff. After N‑71 and N‑92 separate, US-26 continues to Minatare, where the divided highway ends. The highway runs due east until an intersection with Link L-62A (L-62A), when the highway turns south. US-26 passes through Bayard and, after crossing the North Platte River, meets with N‑92 again near Chimney Rock.

US‑26 and N‑92 turn southeast toward Bridgeport. At Bridgeport, N‑92 separates and US‑26 meets US‑385. They cross the North Platte River together and separate. US‑26 continues southeasterly on the north side of the North Platte River. At Broadwater, US‑26 begins its third concurrency with N‑92. They run together through Lisco, Oshkosh, and Lewellen. At Oshkosh, US‑26 meets N-27. At Lewellen, US‑26 and N‑92 separate for the last time and shortly thereafter, US‑26 crosses the North Platte River again. After passing through Ash Hollow State Historical Park, the highway passes through no communities until meeting N‑61 northwest of Ogallala. US‑26 runs concurrent with N‑61 the rest of its length in Nebraska. The two highways go south to US‑30, then the three highways run concurrent into Ogallala. They then separate from US‑30, turn south to cross the South Platte River and US‑26 ends at I‑80.

== History ==
From the creation of the highway in 1926 until the 1930s, US-26 went north of the North Platte River east of Lewellen. This alignment went east to Martin, where US‑26 met N-61 and the two highways went south from there into Ogallala. When Lake McConaughy was built in the 1930s, the current alignment was constructed.

== Major intersections ==
County	Location	mi	km	Destinations	Notes
Sioux	Henry	0.00	0.00	US 26 west / California National Historic Trail / Mormon Pioneer National Historic Trail / Oregon National Historic Trail / Pony Express National Historic Trail – Torrington, Casper	Continuation into Wyoming
Scotts Bluff	Mitchell	13.68	22.02	N-29 north (19th Avenue)	
Scotts Bluff	Scottsbluff	21.64	34.83	N-92 west – Gering	West end of N-92 overlap
Scotts Bluff	Scottsbluff	22.26	35.82	N-71 north / CR 21	West end of N-71 overlap
Scotts Bluff	Scottsbluff	25.67	41.31	N-71 south / N-92 east – Gering, Kimball	East end of N-71/N-92 overlap
Scotts Bluff	Minatare	31.91	51.35	L-79E south / CR 29 – Melbeta	
Morrill	West Bayard Precinct	41.95	67.51	L-62A east – Alliance	Former US-26N
Morrill	Bayard	48.89	78.68	N-92 west – Gering, Scottsbluff, Scotts Bluff National Monument	West end of N-92 overlap
Morrill	Bridgeport	61.42	98.85	US 385 south / N-92 east / California National Historic Trail / Pony Express National Historic Trail	East end of N-92 overlap; west end of US 385 overlap
Morrill	Bridgeport	62.42	100.46	US 385 north – Alliance	East end of US 385 overlap
Morrill	Broadwater	76.49	123.10	N-92 west – Sidney	West end of N-92 overlap
Garden	Oshkosh	106.05	170.67	N-27 south to US 30	
Garden	Lewellen	118.89	191.33	N-92 east – Lake McConaughy	East end of N-92 overlap
Keith	Ogallala	144.90	233.19	N-61 north – Lake McConaughy	West end of N-61 overlap
Keith	Ogallala	148.02	238.22	US 30 west – Sidney	West end of US 30 overlap
Keith	Ogallala	150.01	241.42	US 30 east / Mormon Pioneer National Historic Trail / Oregon National Historic Trail	East end of US 30 overlap
Keith	Ogallala	150.79	242.67	I-80 / N-61 south – Sidney, North Platte, Grant	National eastern terminus; east end of N-61 overlap; I-80 exit 126; highway continues south as N-61
1.000 mi = 1.609 km; 1.000 km = 0.621 mi: Concurrency terminus

== Related routes ==
- U.S. Route 26 city route (Scottsbluff, Nebraska)
- U.S. Route 26N

U.S. Route 26
Previous state: Wyoming	Nebraska	Next state: Terminus
