= Nebraska Highway 27 =

State highway in Nebraska, U.S.

State Highway 27
- N-27 highlighted in red

Route information
- Maintained by NDOT
- Length: 96.61 mi (155.48 km)
- Existed: 1926–present

Southern segment
- Length: 0.78 mi (1,260 m)
- South end: K-27 south of Haigler
- North end: US 34 in Haigler

Middle segment
- Length: 27.11 mi (43.63 km)
- South end: I-80 near Chappell
- Major intersections: US 30 near Chappell
- North end: US 26 / N-92 in Oshkosh

Northern segment
- Length: 68.72 mi (110.59 km)
- South end: N-2 at Ellsworth
- Major intersections: US 20 in Gordon
- North end: SD 391 north of Gordon

Location
- Country: United States
- State: Nebraska
- Counties: Southern segment; Dundy; Middle segment; Deuel; Garden; Northern segment; Sheridan

Highway system
- Nebraska State Highway System; Interstate; US; State; Link; Spur; State Spurs; Recreation
← US 26	→ N-29

Nebraska Highway 27 is a highway in Nebraska. It is divided into three segments. The southernmost segment begins at the Kansas border and goes north to Haigler. The middle segment begins at Interstate 80 near Chappell and goes north to Oshkosh. The northernmost segment begins at Ellsworth and goes north to the South Dakota border.

== Route description ==
=== Southern segment ===
The southern segment of Nebraska Highway 27 begins at the Kansas border. The southern terminus of NE 27 is also the northern terminus of K-27. It goes north 0.78 miles (1.26 km) through farm fields to Haigler, where it intersects U.S. Highway 34 and ends.

=== Middle segment ===
The middle segment of Nebraska Highway 27 begins at Interstate 80 at Exit 95 near Chappell. It goes north through farmland to U.S. Highway 30. It goes west with US 30 for 2 miles (3.2 km), then turns north again. At Oshkosh, NE 27 meets U.S. Highway 26 and the middle segment ends.

=== Northern segment ===
The northern segment of Nebraska Highway 27 begins at Nebraska Highway 2 at Ellsworth. It goes north through the Sand Hills to Gordon, where it intersects U.S. Highway 20. It continues north out of Gordon and ends at the South Dakota border. The roadway continues in South Dakota as South Dakota Highway 391.

The segment of Nebraska Highway 27 between Ellsworth and Gordon runs through cattle range of the famous Spade Ranch and passes notable Nebraska writer Mari Sandoz home and gravesite.

== Major intersections ==
=== Southern segment ===
The entire route is in Haigler, Dundy County.

mi	km	Destinations	Notes
0.00	0.00	K-27 south – St. Francis	Continuation into Kansas
0.78	1.26	US 34 (Nebraska Avenue) – Benkelman, Wray CO	Northern terminus of southern segment
1.000 mi = 1.609 km; 1.000 km = 0.621 mi

=== Middle segment ===
County	Location	mi	km	Destinations	Notes
Deuel		91.78	147.71	Begin state maintenance	Southern terminus of middle segment
Deuel		91.91	147.91	I-80	I-80 exit 95
Deuel		95.16	153.15	US 30 east (Road 14)	South end of US-30 overlap
Deuel		97.15	156.35	US 30 west (Road 14)	North end of US-30 overlap
Garden	Oshkosh	118.89	191.33	US 26 / N-92	Northern terminus of middle segment
1.000 mi = 1.609 km; 1.000 km = 0.621 mi: Concurrency terminus

=== Northern segment ===
The entire route is in Sheridan County.

Location	mi	km	Destinations	Notes
Ellsworth	167.53	269.61	N-2	Southern terminus of northern segment
Gordon	221.66	356.73	US 20	
	236.25	380.21	SD 391 north	Continuation into South Dakota
1.000 mi = 1.609 km; 1.000 km = 0.621 mi
