= U.S. Route 30 in Nebraska =

Section of U.S. Highway in Nebraska, United States

U.S. Highway 30
- US 30 highlighted in red

Route information
- Maintained by NDOT
- Length: 451.74 mi (727.01 km)
- Existed: 1926–present
- Tourist routes: Lincoln Highway Scenic & Historic Byway

Major junctions
- West end: US 30 at Wyoming state line in Pine Bluffs, WY
- N-71 in Kimball; US 385 in Sidney; US 26 in Ogallala; US 83 in North Platte; US 283 in Lexington; US 281 in Grand Island; N-92 near Clarks; US 81 in Columbus; US 77 in Fremont; US 75 in Blair
- East end: US 30 at the Iowa state line in Blair

Location
- Country: United States
- State: Nebraska
- Counties: Kimball, Cheyenne, Deuel, Keith, Lincoln, Dawson, Buffalo, Hall, Merrick, Platte, Colfax, Dodge, Washington

Highway system
- United States Numbered Highway System; List; Special; Divided; Nebraska State Highway System; Interstate; US; State; Link; Spur; State Spurs; Recreation
← N-29	→ N-31

U.S. Highway 30 (US 30) is part of the United States Numbered Highway System that runs for 3,112 miles (5,008 km) from Astoria, Oregon, to Atlantic City, New Jersey. Within the state of Nebraska, it is a state highway that travels 451.74 miles (727.01 km) west to east across the state from the Wyoming state line west of Bushnell to the Missouri River in Blair on the Iowa state line. Despite not intersecting Interstate 80 (I-80) even once, much of its length until Grand Island is closely parallel with the Interstate, not being more than one or two miles (1.6 or 3.2 km) away. For most of its route, US 30 travels within the Platte River valley, adjacent to or near the river between Brule and Fremont, a distance of just over 300 miles (480 km). This corridor was also highly traveled during westward expansion along the California and Oregon trails, it was also used by the Pony Express and first transcontinental railroad. The landscape is dominated by vast agricultural fields within the fertile Platte River valley across the center of the state, while the western portion passes through higher plains and the eastern portion through the rolling hills adjacent to the Missouri River valley.

While US 30 has been mostly superseded by I-80 for long-haul travel across the state, it has been a major thoroughfare across Nebraska since the early 20th century, most notably as a central portion of the historic Lincoln Highway, an early transcontinental route from New York City to San Francisco that passed through Nebraska along the corridor that became US 30 once the route designations of the federal highway system were assigned in 1926. To showcase the historic importance of this early route across the state, the entire length of US 30 across Nebraska has been designated as the Lincoln Highway Scenic and Historic Byway, one of nine scenic byways designated by the Nebraska Department of Roads throughout the state.

== Route description ==
US 30 enters Nebraska just east of Pine Bluffs, Wyoming. It shares the first mile (1.6 km) in Nebraska with I-80 Business (I-80 Bus.). After passing through Bushnell, it enters Kimball, where it meets Old Highway 71 near the center of town. On the east side of Kimball, US 30 passes beneath the new Nebraska Highway 71 (N-71) bypass with access provided via Connecting Link 53E. It then continues east through Dix and Potter before meeting N-19 west of Sidney. It then passes through Sidney concurrent with another I-80 Bus. At the eastern end of Sidney, it meets US 385, and it remains concurrent with that highway through Lodgepole to Chappell. US 30 then runs straight east toward Ogallala, briefly running concurrently with N-27, intersecting US 138 north of Big Springs, and passing through Brule. After Brule, the highway is closely paralleled by the South Platte River to the south. East of Ogallala, US 30 passes through Paxton before meeting N-25 in Sutherland. After going through Hershey, it enters North Platte, where it meets US 83. It then crosses over the North Platte River above where the North and South Platte rivers meet to form the Platte River.

After leaving North Platte, US 30 turns in a southeasterly direction on an alignment north of the Platte River. It passes through Maxwell and Brady before entering Gothenburg, where it meets N-47. It continues southeast into Cozad, where it meets N-21. US 30 and N-21 run concurrent into Lexington, where N-21 separates and US 30 meets the northern end of US 283. US 30 continues southeast through Overton and meets US 183 at Elm Creek. The highway turns east there and passes through Odessa before entering Kearney. In Kearney, US 30 meets N-44 and, east of the city, passes under the new East Kearney Bypass which is the new alignment of N-10. From there, it continues on to Gibbon. US 30 passes through Gibbon, Shelton, Wood River (where it meets N-11), and Alda before entering Grand Island, all of these on an alignment which generally goes northeasterly.

In Grand Island, US 30 intersects US 281 and N-2 on the west side of Grand Island. It goes through downtown Grand Island on a pair of one-way streets, then goes northeast toward Columbus through Chapman before entering Central City. In Central City, US 30 intersects N-14. The highway continues northeast toward Clarks but meets N-92 southwest of Clarks. After Clarks, US 30 meets N-39 in Silver Creek. After going through Duncan, US 30 turns east and intersects US 81 south of Columbus. The highway turns north with US 81 to go into Columbus on a divided highway. They separate in Columbus, and US 30 turns east.

US 30 east of Columbus is a divided highway. It goes east through Richland before changing into a freeway in the Schuyler area. North of Schuyler, US 30 has an interchange with N-15. US 30 then becomes a two-lane highway east of Schuyler through Rogers and meets N-79 in North Bend. It continues east and becomes a divided highway in the Fremont area, serving as the Fremont bypass. North of Fremont, US 30 intersects US 77 and US 275, with US 275 running concurrently around Fremont with US 30. East of Fremont, US 30 continues east again, passing through Arlington before meeting N-31. US 30 turns northeast, meeting N-133 in a roundabout southwest of Blair. In Blair, US 30 then meets N-91 and US 75, which runs concurrently with US 30 in Blair. US 30 then leaves Blair and then leaves Nebraska to enter Iowa via the Blair Bridge.

== History ==
There were two previous alternate routes of US 30 in Nebraska. US 30S was the original route of US 30 in Nebraska. When US 30 was realigned to go between Fremont and Missouri Valley, Iowa, US 30S was created to replace the old US 30 between Fremont and Omaha. That route was decommissioned when US 275 was extended northwest from Council Bluffs, Iowa. Part of that route is today's N-64. Later, US 30A was created, which followed today's N-92 east from Clarks to Omaha. Both of these alternate routes went into Iowa at Omaha.

== Major intersections ==
County	Location	mi	km	Destinations	Notes
Kimball	Bushnell Precinct	0.00	0.00	US 30 west / I-80 BL west / Lincoln Highway – Pine Bluffs	Continuation into Wyoming; I-80 BL eastern terminus; eastern end of I-80 BL concurrency
Kimball	Bushnell Precinct	0.40	0.64	L-53B south to I-80	Former eastern end of I-80 BL concurrency
Kimball	Bushnell Precinct	9.07	14.60	L-53C south to I-80	
Kimball	Kimball	22.31	35.90	L-53E to I-80 / N-71	
Kimball	Dix	30.29	48.75	L-53A south (Spruce Street) to I-80	
Cheyenne	Potter	39.59	63.71	L-17B south to I-80	
Cheyenne	Brownson	50.13	80.68	L-17C south to I-80	Access to Road 17A – Industrial Park
Cheyenne	Sidney 4–Sidney 2 precinct line	55.56	89.42	N-19 south to I-80	Former western end of I-80 BL concurrency
Cheyenne	Sidney	60.07	96.67	L-17J south to I-80	Serves Sidney Municipal Airport and Sidney Regional Medical Center; former eastern end of I-80 BL concurrency
Cheyenne	Sidney	60.38	97.17	US 385 north – Bridgeport	Western end of US 385 concurrency
Cheyenne	Sunol	69.88	112.46	L-17E south to I-80	
Cheyenne	Lodgepole	77.06	124.02	L-17F south to I-80	
Deuel	Chappell	86.12	138.60	US 385 south (Babcock Avenue) to I-80	Eastern end of US 385 concurrency
Deuel	Swan Precinct	92.85	149.43	N-27 north – Oshkosh	Western end of N-27 concurrency
Deuel	Swan Precinct	94.84	152.63	N-27 south to I-80 – Julesburg	Eastern end of N-27 concurrency
Deuel	Big Springs Precinct	107.09	172.34	US 138 west to I-80 – Big Springs	
Keith	Brule	116.57	187.60	L-51A south to I-80	
Keith	Brule Precinct	123.82	199.27	US 26 west / N-61 north	Western end of US 26/N-61 concurrency
Keith	Ogallala	125.81	202.47	East A Street / US 26 east / N-61 south to I-80	Eastern end of US 26/N-61 concurrency; East A St. serves Ogallala Community Hospital
Keith	Roscoe	133.29	214.51	L-51B south to I-80	
Keith	Paxton	144.92	233.23	L-51C south to I-80	
Lincoln	Sutherland Precinct	156.52	251.89	N-25 south to I-80 – Wallace	
Lincoln	Hershey	163.77	263.56	L-56C south to I-80	
Lincoln	Hinman Precinct	163.77	263.56	Hoover Road (R-56E east)	Access to Buffalo Bill Ranch
Lincoln	North Platte	176.71	284.39	US 83 (Jeffers Street) to I-80 – Downtown	Serves Great Plains Health
Lincoln	North Platte	179.00	288.07	L-56G south to I-80	
Lincoln	Maxwell	190.48	306.55	S-56A south (Pine Street) to I-80 – Fort McPherson National Cemetery	
Lincoln	Brady	199.39	320.89	L-56D south to I-80	
Dawson	Gothenburg	212.34	341.73	Avenue D (L-24D) to I-80 / N-47	
Dawson	Cozad	222.91	358.74	N-21 south (F Street) to I-80	Western end of N-21 concurrency
Dawson	Coyote Precinct	231.14	371.98	L-24A south to I-80 – Darr Bridge	
Dawson	Lexington	236.37	380.40	N-21 north (Ontario Street) to US 283 south	Eastern end of N-21 concurrency; access to Adams Street
Dawson	Lexington	236.94– 237.09	381.32– 381.56	US 283 south (Grant Street) to I-80	Northern terminus of US 283
Dawson	Overton Precinct	247.35	398.07	L-24B south to I-80	
Buffalo	Elm Creek	256.10	412.15	L-10E north to I-80 / US 183	
Buffalo	Odessa	262.95	423.18	L-10B south (Odessa Road) to I-80 – Odessa	
Buffalo	Kearney	272.01	437.76	2nd Avenue to I-80	Former N-44 south; former N-10 north
Buffalo	Kearney	275.08	442.70	L-10F to N-10 / I-80	
Buffalo	Precinct 22–Precinct 29 line			Keystone Road to I-80	Former N-10 south
Buffalo	Gibbon	285.06	458.76	L-10C south (Center Street) to I-80 – Business District	
Buffalo	Shelton	290.91	468.17	L-10D south (Shelton Road) to I-80	
Hall	Wood River	298.46	480.32	L-40G north (Cottonwood Street) to N-11	
Hall	Alda	306.24	492.85	L-40C south to I-80	
Hall	Grand Island	312.09	502.26	US 281 south / N-2 east to I-80 – Hastings, St. Paul	Interchange
Merrick	Central City	336.72	541.90	N-14 (17th Avenue)	
Merrick	Central Township	345.64	556.25	N-92 – Omaha	One-quadrant interchange; access via unsigned L-61D; N-92 east is former US 30A
Merrick	Silver Creek	358.95	577.67	N-39	
Platte	Columbus Township	376.47	605.87	US 81 south – York	Western end of US 81 concurrency
Platte	Loup River	377.73	607.90	Concrete bridge {eastbound} Columbus Loup River Bridge (westbound)	
Platte	Columbus	378.45	609.06	US 81 north / US 30 Alt. east (23rd Street west)	Eastern end of US 81 concurrency; western terminus of US 30 Alt.; serves Columbus Community Hospital
Platte	Columbus			US 30 Alt. west (East 6th Avenue) to US 81 north	Eastern terminus of US 30 Alt.; serves Columbus Community Hospital
Colfax	Schuyler Precinct	393.27	632.91	County Road 9 – Schuyler	Interchange
Colfax	Schuyler	395.37	636.29	N-15 (Road 11) – Schuyler	Interchange
Dodge	Cotterell Township	410.00	659.83	N-79	
Dodge	Fremont	425.56	684.87	US 77 north / US 275 west – Norfolk, South Sioux City	Interchange; western end of US 77/US 275 concurrency
Dodge	Fremont	429.20	690.73	US 275 east / US 77 south (West Dodge Expressway)	Interchange, eastern end of US 275/US 77 concurrency
Washington	Township 7	441.32	710.24	N-31 south – Elkhorn	
Washington	Township 2	443.18	713.23	S-89A north – Kennard	
Washington	Blair	447.48	720.15	N-133 south	Roundabout
Washington	Blair	449.26	723.01	US 75 north / Lewis and Clark Trail north (Nineteenth Street north) / N-91 west (Washington Street west)	Western end of US 75/LCT concurrency
Washington	Blair	449.77	723.83	US 75 south (13th Street) / Lewis and Clark Trail south	Eastern end of US 75/LCT concurrency
Missouri River		451.74	727.01	Blair Bridge; Nebraska–Iowa line	
Missouri River		451.74	727.01	US 30 east / Lincoln Highway Heritage Byway – Missouri Valley	Continuation into Iowa
1.000 mi = 1.609 km; 1.000 km = 0.621 mi: Concurrency terminus

U.S. Route 30
Previous state: Wyoming	Nebraska	Next state: Iowa

Lincoln Highway
Previous state: Wyoming	Nebraska	Next state: Iowa
