= Ansley Township, Custer County, Nebraska =

Ansley Township
- Township
- Location in Custer County
- Coordinates: 41°17′19″N 099°23′44″W
- Country: United States
- State: Nebraska
- County: Custer

Area
  - Total: 51.05 sq mi (132.23 km^{2})
  - Land: 51.05 sq mi (132.23 km^{2})
  - Water: 0 sq mi (0 km^{2}) 0%
- Elevation: 2,343 ft (714 m)

Population (2020)
  - Total: 607
  - Density: 11.9/sq mi (4.59/km^{2})
- GNIS feature ID: 0837853

Ansley Township is one of thirty-one townships in Custer County, Nebraska, United States. The population was 607 at the 2020 census. A 2021 estimate placed the township's population at 606.

The Village of Ansley lies within the Township.

== See also ==
- County government in Nebraska
