= Agate, Nebraska =

Unincorporated community in Nebraska, United States

- Unincorporated community
- Location within Nebraska Location within the United States
- Coordinates: 42°25′12″N 103°47′38″W
- Country: United States
- State: Nebraska
- County: Sioux
- Elevation: 4,439 ft (1,353 m)
- Time zone: UTC−7 (Mountain (MST))
  - Summer (DST): UTC−6 (MDT)
- Area code: 308
- GNIS feature ID: 834977

Agate is in Sioux County, Nebraska, United States. Agate is located on Nebraska Highway 29, 19 miles (31 km) south-southeast of Harrison. It is home to Agate Fossil Beds National Monument.

== History ==
A post office was established at Agate in 1899, and remained in operation until it was discontinued in 1968. Agate was named for James H. Cook's Agate Springs Ranch, which was in turn named for the agate deposits in the area.

== Climate ==
According to the Köppen Climate Classification system, Agate has a cool semi-arid climate, abbreviated BSk on climate maps.

Climate data for Agate, Nebraska (1991–2020 normals, extremes 1900–1907, 1964–present)
| Month | Jan | Feb | Mar | Apr | May | Jun | Jul | Aug | Sep | Oct | Nov | Dec | Year |
|---|---|---|---|---|---|---|---|---|---|---|---|---|---|
| Record high °F (°C) | 71 (22) | 72 (22) | 83 (28) | 90 (32) | 95 (35) | 106 (41) | 108 (42) | 103 (39) | 101 (38) | 90 (32) | 79 (26) | 72 (22) | 108 (42) |
| Mean maximum °F (°C) | 58.8 (14.9) | 61.4 (16.3) | 72.2 (22.3) | 80.1 (26.7) | 87.5 (30.8) | 94.0 (34.4) | 98.4 (36.9) | 96.7 (35.9) | 93.1 (33.9) | 83.4 (28.6) | 70.8 (21.6) | 60.0 (15.6) | 99.3 (37.4) |
| Mean daily maximum °F (°C) | 40.5 (4.7) | 42.7 (5.9) | 53.6 (12.0) | 61.3 (16.3) | 70.2 (21.2) | 81.2 (27.3) | 88.7 (31.5) | 87.5 (30.8) | 79.7 (26.5) | 65.0 (18.3) | 50.5 (10.3) | 40.4 (4.7) | 63.4 (17.4) |
| Daily mean °F (°C) | 25.7 (−3.5) | 27.8 (−2.3) | 37.5 (3.1) | 45.3 (7.4) | 54.6 (12.6) | 64.7 (18.2) | 71.2 (21.8) | 69.3 (20.7) | 60.3 (15.7) | 46.8 (8.2) | 34.2 (1.2) | 25.2 (−3.8) | 46.9 (8.3) |
| Mean daily minimum °F (°C) | 11.0 (−11.7) | 12.9 (−10.6) | 21.4 (−5.9) | 29.2 (−1.6) | 39.0 (3.9) | 48.2 (9.0) | 53.7 (12.1) | 51.1 (10.6) | 41.0 (5.0) | 28.5 (−1.9) | 18.0 (−7.8) | 9.9 (−12.3) | 30.3 (−0.9) |
| Mean minimum °F (°C) | −15.7 (−26.5) | −11.8 (−24.3) | 0.9 (−17.3) | 11.0 (−11.7) | 21.0 (−6.1) | 32.3 (0.2) | 39.8 (4.3) | 35.6 (2.0) | 23.1 (−4.9) | 7.4 (−13.7) | −4.9 (−20.5) | −16.2 (−26.8) | −24.2 (−31.2) |
| Record low °F (°C) | −34 (−37) | −41 (−41) | −27 (−33) | −17 (−27) | 12 (−11) | 20 (−7) | 29 (−2) | 27 (−3) | 5 (−15) | −14 (−26) | −21 (−29) | −44 (−42) | −44 (−42) |
| Average precipitation inches (mm) | 0.22 (5.6) | 0.35 (8.9) | 0.64 (16) | 1.52 (39) | 2.89 (73) | 2.31 (59) | 2.21 (56) | 1.60 (41) | 1.29 (33) | 1.12 (28) | 0.44 (11) | 0.31 (7.9) | 14.90 (378) |
| Average snowfall inches (cm) | 4.1 (10) | 5.7 (14) | 5.6 (14) | 5.4 (14) | 1.6 (4.1) | 0.0 (0.0) | 0.0 (0.0) | 0.0 (0.0) | 0.3 (0.76) | 2.4 (6.1) | 4.3 (11) | 4.8 (12) | 34.2 (87) |
| Average precipitation days (≥ 0.01 in) | 3.9 | 4.4 | 5.1 | 7.2 | 10.8 | 9.4 | 8.0 | 7.0 | 6.1 | 6.1 | 3.8 | 3.4 | 75.2 |
| Average snowy days (≥ 0.1 in) | 3.1 | 3.8 | 3.2 | 2.3 | 0.6 | 0.0 | 0.0 | 0.0 | 0.1 | 1.1 | 2.4 | 3.4 | 20.0 |
Source: NOAA
