= Denby, South Dakota =

Unincorporated community in South Dakota, U.S.

Coordinates: 43°03′39″N 102°20′16″W

Denby is an unincorporated community in Oglala Lakota County, in the U.S. state of South Dakota.

== History ==
A post office called Denby was established in 1922, and remained in operation until 1985. The community was named for Edwin Denby, 42nd United States Secretary of the Navy.
