= Nenzel, Nebraska =

Village in Cherry County, Nebraska, United States

- Village
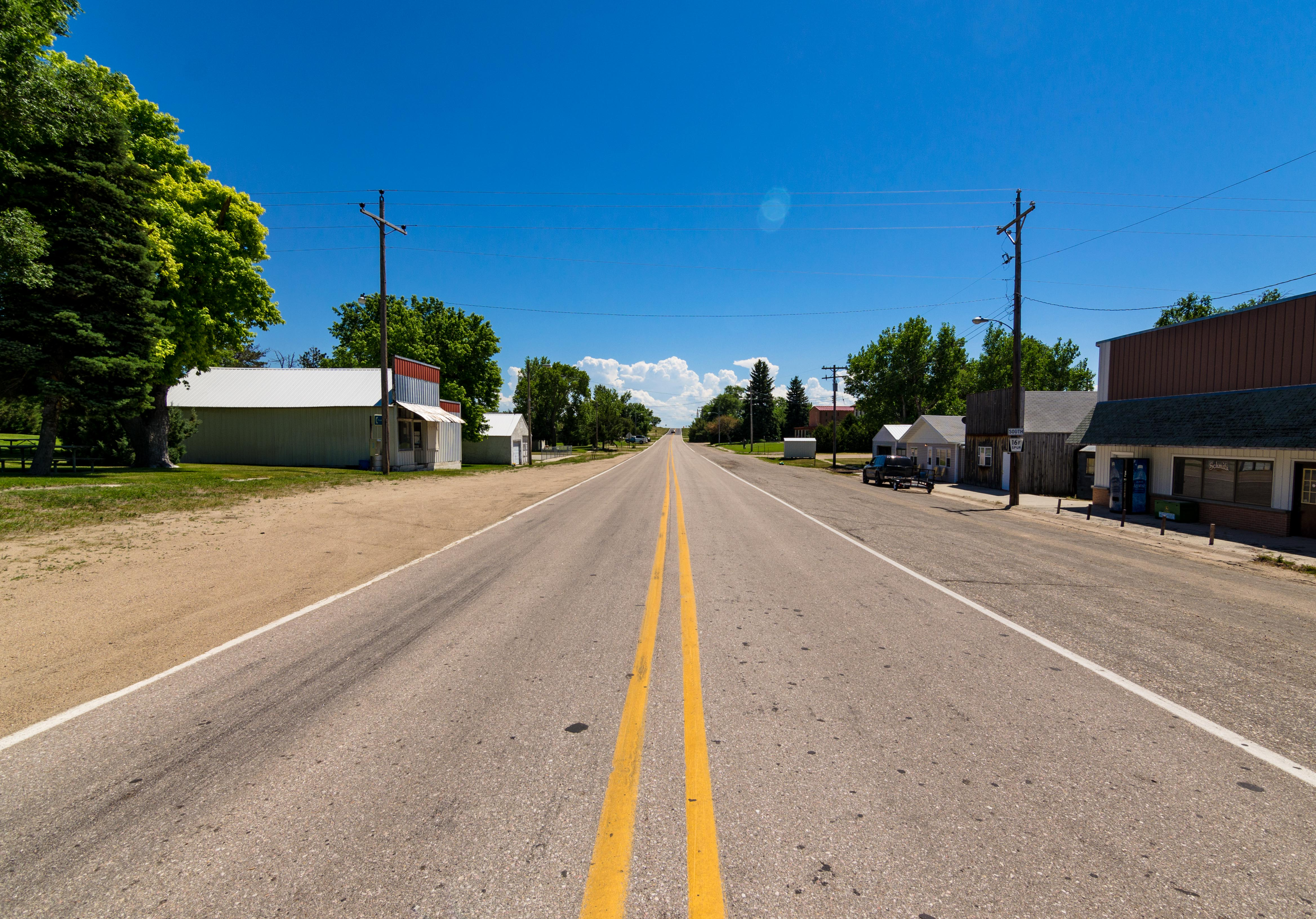
- South on Nebraska Spur 16F in Nenzel, July 2017

- Location of Nenzel, Nebraska
- Coordinates: 42°55′38″N 101°06′06″W
- Country: United States
- State: Nebraska
- County: Cherry
- Incorporated: 1899

Area
  - Total: 0.31 sq mi (0.81 km^{2})
  - Land: 0.31 sq mi (0.81 km^{2})
  - Water: 0 sq mi (0.00 km^{2})
- Elevation: 3,123 ft (952 m)

Population (2020)
  - Total: 17
  - Estimate (2022): 18
  - Density: 55/sq mi (21.1/km^{2})
- Time zone: UTC–7 (Mountain (MST))
  - Summer (DST): UTC–6 (MDT)
- ZIP Code: 69219
- Area codes: 402 and 531
- FIPS code: 31-33985
- GNIS feature ID: 2399445
- Sales tax: 5.5%

Nenzel is a village in Cherry County, Nebraska, United States. The population was 17 at the 2020 census.

== History ==
Nenzel was incorporated as a village in 1899. It was named for George Nenzel, the original owner of the town site.

== Geography ==
According to the United States Census Bureau, the village has a total area of 0.31 square miles (0.80 km^{2}), all land.

== Demographics ==
Historical population
Census	Pop.	Note	%±
1930	76		—
1940	125		64.5%
1950	24		−80.8%
1960	43		79.2%
1970	27		−37.2%
1980	28		3.7%
1990	8		−71.4%
2000	13		62.5%
2010	20		53.8%
2020	17		−15.0%
2022 (est.)	18	▲	5.9%
U.S. Decennial Census; 2020 Census

=== 2010 census ===
As of the 2010 census, there were 20 people, 7 households, and 5 families living in the village. The population density was 64.5 inhabitants per square mile (24.9/km^{2}). There were 8 housing units at an average density of 25.8 per square mile (10.0/km^{2}). The racial makeup of the village was 75.0% White and 25.0% Native American.

Of the 7 households 42.9% had children under the age of 18 living with them, 57.1% were married couples living together, 14.3% had a male householder with no wife present, and 28.6% were non-families. 28.6% of households were one person and 28.6% were one person aged 65 or older. The average household size was 2.86 and the average family size was 3.40.

The median age in the village was 31.5 years. 40% of residents were under the age of 18; 0.0% were between the ages of 18 and 24; 20% were from 25 to 44; 20% were from 45 to 64; and 20% were 65 or older. The gender makeup of the village was 45.0% male and 55.0% female.

=== 2000 census ===
As of the 2000 census, there were 13 people, 6 households, and 4 families living in the village. The population density was 41.7 inhabitants per square mile (16.1/km^{2}). There were 6 housing units at an average density of 19.3 per square mile (7.5/km^{2}). The racial makeup of the village was 100.00% White.

Of the 6 households 16.7% (1 household) had children under the age of 18 living with them, 66.7% (4 households) were married couples living together, and 33.3% (2 households) were non-families. 33.3% (2 households) of all households were one person and 16.7% (1 houseshold) had someone living alone who was 65 or older. The average household size was 2.17 and the average family size was 2.75.

The age distribution was 23.1% under the age of 18, 23.1% from 25 to 44, 23.1% from 45 to 64, and 30.8% 65 or older. The median age was 48 years. For every 100 females, there were 85.7 males. For every 100 females age 18 and over, there were 66.7 males.

The median household income was $53,750, and the median family income was $53,750. Males had a median income of $28,750 versus $26,250 for females. The per capita income for the village was $21,600. None of the population and none of the families were below the poverty line.

== See also ==
- List of municipalities in Nebraska
