= Ansley, Nebraska =

- Village
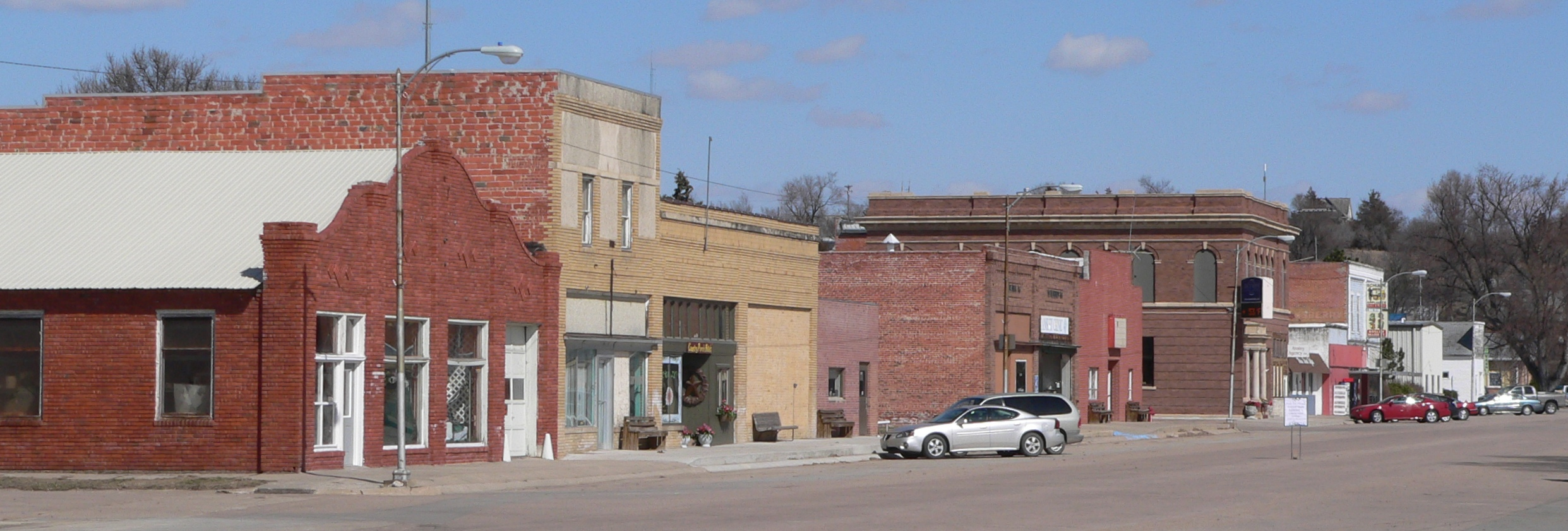
- Downtown Ansley, seen from the southeast

- Location of Ansley, Nebraska

- Location within Nebraska Location within the United States
- Coordinates: 41°17′11″N 99°22′57″W
- Country: United States
- State: Nebraska
- County: Custer
- Township: Ansley

Area
  - Total: 0.72 sq mi (1.86 km^{2})
  - Land: 0.72 sq mi (1.86 km^{2})
  - Water: 0 sq mi (0.00 km^{2})
- Elevation: 2,300 ft (700 m)

Population (2020)
  - Total: 459
  - Density: 639.3/sq mi (246.85/km^{2})
- Time zone: UTC-6 (Central (CST))
  - Summer (DST): UTC-5 (CDT)
- ZIP code: 68814
- Area code: 308
- FIPS code: 31-01535
- GNIS feature ID: 2397967
- Website: ansleyne.com

Ansley is a village in Custer County, Nebraska, United States. As of the 2020 census, Ansley had a population of 459.

== History ==
Ansley got its start in the year 1886, following construction of the Burlington and Missouri River Railroad through the territory. The town was named Ansley in honor of a lady of that name who bought several lots.

== Geography ==
According to the United States Census Bureau, the village has a total area of 0.59 square miles (1.53 km^{2}), all land.

== Demographics ==
Historical population
Census	Pop.	Note	%±
1900	468		—
1910	700		49.6%
1920	775		10.7%
1930	817		5.4%
1940	753		−7.8%
1950	711		−5.6%
1960	714		0.4%
1970	631		−11.6%
1980	644		2.1%
1990	555		−13.8%
2000	520		−6.3%
2010	441		−15.2%
2020	459		4.1%
U.S. Decennial Census

=== 2010 census ===
As of the census of 2010, there were 441 people, 202 households, and 121 families living in the village. The population density was 747.5 inhabitants per square mile (288.6/km^{2}). There were 256 housing units at an average density of 433.9 per square mile (167.5/km^{2}). The racial makeup of the village was 98.0% White, 0.5% Native American, 1.4% from other races, and 0.2% from two or more races. Hispanic or Latino of any race were 1.4% of the population.

There were 202 households, of which 22.3% had children under the age of 18 living with them, 49.5% were married couples living together, 5.4% had a female householder with no husband present, 5.0% had a male householder with no wife present, and 40.1% were non-families. 33.7% of all households were made up of individuals, and 16.8% had someone living alone who was 65 years of age or older. The average household size was 2.18 and the average family size was 2.79.

The median age in the village was 46.5 years. 19% of residents were under the age of 18; 7.8% were between the ages of 18 and 24; 19.1% were from 25 to 44; 29.2% were from 45 to 64; and 24.9% were 65 years of age or older. The gender makeup of the village was 50.3% male and 49.7% female.

=== 2000 census ===
As of the census of 2000, there were 520 people, 224 households, and 152 families living in the village. The population density was 863.4 inhabitants per square mile (333.4/km^{2}). There were 266 housing units at an average density of 441.7 per square mile (170.5/km^{2}). The racial makeup of the village was 99.04% White, 0.38% Native American, 0.19% from other races, and 0.38% from two or more races. Hispanic or Latino of any race were 1.54% of the population.

There were 224 households, out of which 27.2% had children under the age of 18 living with them, 55.8% were married couples living together, 7.6% had a female householder with no husband present, and 31.7% were non-families. 30.4% of all households were made up of individuals, and 15.6% had someone living alone who was 65 years of age or older. The average household size was 2.32 and the average family size was 2.88.

In the village, the population was spread out, with 25.6% under the age of 18, 8.1% from 18 to 24, 23.1% from 25 to 44, 23.1% from 45 to 64, and 20.2% who were 65 years of age or older. The median age was 40 years. For every 100 females, there were 100.8 males. For every 100 females age 18 and over, there were 99.5 males.

As of 2000 the median income for a household in the village was $27,760, and the median income for a family was $30,000. Males had a median income of $24,417 versus $18,929 for females. The per capita income for the village was $14,144. About 7.5% of families and 10.4% of the population were below the poverty line, including 5.7% of those under age 18 and 12.1% of those age 65 or over.

== Notable people ==
- James F. Bonner (1910–1996), molecular biologist, born in Ansley
- John Rhodes (1902-1951), football player and coach, born in Ansley
- Robert M. Wilkinson (ca. 1921–2010), Los Angeles City Council member and lobbyist, born in Ansley
