= List of U.S. Highways in Nebraska =

United States Numbered Highways of the State Highway System
- Highway markers from different years for U.S. Highway 30 (1926), U.S. Highway 6 (1948), and U.S. Highway 83

- U.S. Highways in Nebraska highlighted in red

System information
- Maintained by NDOT
- Length: 3,553 mi (5,718 km)
- Formed: November 11, 1926

Highway names
- US Highways: U.S. Highway X (US-X)

System links
- Nebraska State Highway System; Interstate; US; State; Link; Spur; State Spurs; Recreation

The U.S. Highways in Nebraska are the segments of the national United States Numbered Highway System that are owned and maintained by the U.S. State of Nebraska totaling 3,553 miles (5,718 km). The longest of these routes is U.S. Route 30 at around 452 miles (727 km). On a national level, the standards and numbering for the system are handled by the American Association of State Highway and Transportation Officials (AASHTO), while the Nebraska Department of Transportation is responsible for their maintenance. Route numbers are not reused between the various highway systems within the state. For example, Interstate 80 is the only route in Nebraska with the number 80.

== Description ==
NDOT is the agency responsible for the daily maintenance and operations of the State Highway System which includes the U.S. Highways. The numbering for these highways is coordinated through AASHTO, an organization coordinating various state departments of transportation within the United States. Under the 1926 highway numbering plan, two-digit U.S. Highways are numbered in a grid; east–west highways have even numbers while north–south routes have odd numbers. The lowest numbers are in the east and north. The primary east–west highways in Nebraska are numbered US-6, US-20, US-26, US-30, and US-34. The primary north–south highways in Nebraska are numbered US-73, US-75, US-77, US-81, and US-83. In addition to these are various three-digit highway designations which are branches of related two-digit highways.

== Mainline highways ==
Number	Length (mi)	Length (km)	Southern or western terminus	Northern or eastern terminus	Formed	Removed	Notes
US 6	373	600	US-6 at Colorado border near Holyoke, Colorado	I-480/US-6 at Iowa border near Omaha	1932	current	
US 20	428.39	689.43	US-20 at Wyoming border near Harrison	I-129/US-20/US-75 at Iowa border in South Sioux City	1926	current	Portion between the Wyoming state line and Valentine is known as the Bridges to Buttes Byway
US 26	150.79	242.67	US-26 at Wyoming border near Torrington, Wyoming	I-80/N-61 in Ogallala	1926	current	
US 26N	—	—	US-26 near Bayard	US-26 in Broadwater	1936	1959	Old routing of US-26; became L-62A, US-26 and US-385
US 30	451.74	727.01	US-30 at Wyoming border near Pine Bluffs, Wyoming	US-30 at Iowa border near Blair	1926	current	
US 30A	—	—	US-30 near Clarks	US-6/US-30A at Iowa border in Omaha	1939	c. 1968	Replaced by US-6, US-275, and N-92
US 30S	—	—	US-30 in Fremont	US-6/US-30S at Iowa border in Omaha	1932	1939	Former N-18 and old routing of US-30, replaced by US-30A and US-275
US 32	—	—	US 6 in Omaha	Iowa state line	1926	1934	Became an extension of US 6
US 34	387.83	624.15	US-34 at Colorado border near Haigler	US-34 at Iowa border near La Platte	1934	current	
US 38	—	—	US-30 in Fremont	US-6/US-30S at Iowa border in Omaha	1926	1932	Former N-7, became an extension of US 6
US 73	97.71	157.25	US-73/US-159 at Kansas border near Falls City	US-75 in Dawson	1926	current	
US 73E	—	—	US-73 in Tekamah	US-73/US-77 in Winnebago	1933	1957	Former N-51 and unmarked roads; replaced by US-73
US 73W	—	—	US-73 in Tekamah	US-73/US-77 in Winnebago	1933	1957	Former N-5; replaced by N-32 and US-77
US 75	184.72	297.28	US-75 at Kansas border near Dawson	I-129/US-20/US-75 at Iowa border in South Sioux City	1926	current	
US 77	189.88	305.58	US-77 at Kansas border near Wymore	US-77 at Iowa border in Sioux City, Iowa	1926	current	
US 81	216.69	348.73	US-81 at Kansas border in Chester	US-81 at South Dakota border in Yankton, South Dakota	1926	current	Crosses the Missouri River via the Discovery Bridge
US 83	222.79	358.55	US-83 at Kansas border south of McCook	US-83 at South Dakota border north of Valentine	1931	current	Swapped with US 183 in the early 1940s
US 136	239.88	386.05	US-6/US-34 near Edison	US-136 at Missouri border at Brownville	1960	current	Created in 1951, extended into Nebraska in 1960 over N-3; known as the Heritage Highway
US 138	11.47	18.46	US-138 at Colorado border north of Julesburg	US-30 north of Big Springs	1926	current	
US 159	13.86	22.31	US-73/US-159 at Kansas state line South of Falls City	US-159 at Missouri state line on Missouri River in Rulo	1934	current	
US 183	225.91	363.57	US-183 at Kansas border near the Harlan County Reservoir	US-183 at South Dakota border near Wewela	c. 1931	current	Swapped with US 83 in the early 1940s
US 275	190.82	307.10	US-275 at Iowa border in Omaha	US-20/US-281 in O'Neill	1939	current	Originally created in 1932, extended into Nebraska in 1939 replacing N-7
US 281	222.78	358.53	US-281 at Kansas border south of Red Cloud	US-281 at South Dakota border near Spencer	1933	current	Commissioned in 1932, extended into Nebraska in 1933; replaced N-2 south of Grand Island
US 283	58.44	94.05	US-283 at Kansas border south of Beaver City	US-30 in Lexington	1942	current	Commissioned in 1932, extended into Nebraska in 1942 replacing N-21
US 383	51	82	US-183/US-383 at Kansas state line south of Alma	US-30/US-183 in Elm Creek	1942	1982	Ran concurrent with US-183 for its entire length; truncated to Alma in 1962; now US-183
US 385	180.36	290.26	US-385 at Colorado border west of Julesburg, Colorado	US-385 at South Dakota border north of Chadron	1958	current	Known as the Gold Rush Byway.
Former
