= National Register of Historic Places listings in Fall River County, South Dakota =

Location of Fall River County in South Dakota

This is a list of the National Register of Historic Places listings in Fall River County, South Dakota.

This is intended to be a complete list of the properties and districts on the National Register of Historic Places in Fall River County, South Dakota, United States. The locations of National Register properties and districts for which the latitude and longitude coordinates are included below, may be seen in a map.

There are 75 properties and districts listed on the National Register in the county. Another property was once listed but has been removed.

This National Park Service list is complete through NPS recent listings posted March 21, 2025.

== Current listings ==
	Name on the Register	Image	Date listed	Location	City or town	Description
1	Allen Bank Building and Cascade Springs Bath House-Sanitarium	Allen Bank Building and Cascade Springs Bath House-Sanitarium	February 23, 1984 (#84003285)	SD 71 about 9 miles south of Hot Springs; 43°20′14″N 103°33′22″W	Hot Springs vicinity	Only surviving building of a failed resort community
2	Archeological Site No. 39FA86	Archeological Site No. 39FA86	August 6, 1993 (#93000804)	Address restricted	Edgemont	
3	Archeological Site No. 39FA88	Archeological Site No. 39FA88	October 20, 1993 (#93001040)	Address restricted	Edgemont	
4	Archeological Site No. 39FA89	Archeological Site No. 39FA89	August 6, 1993 (#93000806)	Address restricted	Edgemont	
5	Archeological Site No. 39FA90	Archeological Site No. 39FA90	October 20, 1993 (#93001041)	Address restricted	Hot Springs	
6	Archeological Site No. 39FA99	Archeological Site No. 39FA99	October 20, 1993 (#93001042)	Address restricted	Edgemont	
7	Archeological Site No. 39FA243	Archeological Site No. 39FA243	October 20, 1993 (#93001043)	Address restricted	Edgemont	
8	Archeological Site No. 39FA244	Archeological Site No. 39FA244	October 20, 1993 (#93001044)	Address restricted	Edgemont	
9	Archeological Site No. 39FA316	Archeological Site No. 39FA316	October 20, 1993 (#93001045)	Address restricted	Edgemont	
10	Archeological Site No. 39FA321	Archeological Site No. 39FA321	October 20, 1993 (#93001046)	Address restricted	Edgemont	
11	Archeological Site No. 39FA395	Archeological Site No. 39FA395	October 20, 1993 (#93001047)	Address restricted	Edgemont	
12	Archeological Site No. 39FA446	Archeological Site No. 39FA446	October 20, 1993 (#93001048)	Address restricted	Edgemont	
13	Archeological Site No. 39FA447	Archeological Site No. 39FA447	October 20, 1993 (#93001049)	Address restricted	Edgemont	
14	Archeological Site No. 39FA448	Archeological Site No. 39FA448	October 20, 1993 (#93001050)	Address restricted	Edgemont	
15	Archeological Site No. 39FA542	Archeological Site No. 39FA542	October 25, 1993 (#93001051)	Address restricted	Edgemont	
16	Archeological Site No. 39FA678	Archeological Site No. 39FA678	August 6, 1993 (#93000801)	Address restricted	Edgemont	
17	Archeological Site No. 39FA679	Archeological Site No. 39FA679	October 20, 1993 (#93001052)	Address restricted	Edgemont	
18	Archeological Site No. 39FA680	Archeological Site No. 39FA680	October 20, 1993 (#93001053)	Address restricted	Edgemont	
19	Archeological Site No. 39FA682	Archeological Site No. 39FA682	October 20, 1993 (#93001054)	Address restricted	Edgemont	
20	Archeological Site No. 39FA683	Archeological Site No. 39FA683	October 20, 1993 (#93001055)	Address restricted	Edgemont	
21	Archeological Site No. 39FA686	Archeological Site No. 39FA686	October 20, 1993 (#93001056)	Address restricted	Edgemont	
22	Archeological Site No. 39FA688	Archeological Site No. 39FA688	October 20, 1993 (#93001057)	Address restricted	Edgemont	
23	Archeological Site No. 39FA690	Archeological Site No. 39FA690	October 20, 1993 (#93001058)	Address restricted	Edgemont	
24	Archeological Site No. 39FA691	Archeological Site No. 39FA691	October 20, 1993 (#93001059)	Address restricted	Edgemont	
25	Archeological Site No. 39FA767	Archeological Site No. 39FA767	October 20, 1993 (#93001060)	Address restricted	Edgemont	
26	Archeological Site No. 39FA788	Archeological Site No. 39FA788	October 20, 1993 (#93001061)	Address restricted	Edgemont	
27	Archeological Site No. 39FA806	Archeological Site No. 39FA806	August 6, 1993 (#93000790)	Address restricted	Hot Springs	
28	Archeological Site No. 39FA819	Archeological Site No. 39FA819	October 20, 1993 (#93001062)	Address restricted	Edgemont	
29	Archeological Site No. 39FA1010	Archeological Site No. 39FA1010	October 20, 1993 (#93001063)	Address restricted	Hot Springs	
30	Archeological Site No. 39FA1013	Archeological Site No. 39FA1013	October 20, 1993 (#93001064)	Address restricted	Hot Springs	
31	Archeological Site No. 39FA1046	Archeological Site No. 39FA1046	October 20, 1993 (#93001065)	Address restricted	Edgemont	
32	Archeological Site No. 39FA1049	Archeological Site No. 39FA1049	August 6, 1993 (#93000791)	Address restricted	Hot Springs	
33	Archeological Site No. 39FA1093	Archeological Site No. 39FA1093	October 20, 1993 (#93001066)	Address restricted	Hot Springs	
34	Archeological Site No. 39FA1152	Archeological Site No. 39FA1152	October 20, 1993 (#93001067)	Address restricted	Hot Springs	
35	Archeological Site No. 39FA1154	Archeological Site No. 39FA1154	October 20, 1993 (#93001068)	Address restricted	Hot Springs	
36	Archeological Site No. 39FA1155	Archeological Site No. 39FA1155	October 20, 1993 (#93001069)	Address restricted	Hot Springs	
37	Archeological Site No. 39FA1190	Archeological Site No. 39FA1190	October 20, 1993 (#93001070)	Address restricted	Edgemont	
38	Archeological Site No. 39FA1201	Archeological Site No. 39FA1201	August 6, 1993 (#93000792)	Address restricted	Edgemont	
39	Archeological Site No. 39FA1204	Archeological Site No. 39FA1204	October 20, 1993 (#93001071)	Address restricted	Hot Springs	
40	Archeological Site 39FA1336	Archeological Site 39FA1336	July 14, 2005 (#05000690)	Address restricted	Edgemont	
41	Archeological Site 39FA1337	Archeological Site 39FA1337	July 14, 2005 (#05000689)	Address restricted	Edgemont	
42	Archeological Site 39FA1638	Archeological Site 39FA1638	July 14, 2005 (#05000691)	Address restricted	Edgemont	
43	Archeological Site 39FA2530	Archeological Site 39FA2530	February 23, 2016 (#16000051)	Address restricted	Edgemont	
44	Archeological Site 39FA2531	Archeological Site 39FA2531	February 23, 2016 (#16000052)	Address restricted	Edgemont	
45	Bartlett-Myers Building	Bartlett-Myers Building	May 31, 2006 (#06000457)	506½ 2nd Ave. 43°18′01″N 103°49′32″W	Edgemont	
46	Battle Mountain Sanitarium, National Home For Disabled Volunteer Soldiers	Battle Mountain Sanitarium, National Home For Disabled Volunteer Soldiers	June 17, 2011 (#11000561)	500 North Fifth Street; 43°26′13″N 103°28′35″W	Hot Springs	
47	Chilson Bridge	Chilson Bridge	December 9, 1993 (#93001287)	Local road over BNSF railroad tracks 43°19′47″N 103°44′02″W	Edgemont	Closed to vehicular traffic.
48	Arthur and Ellen Colgan House	Arthur and Ellen Colgan House	July 31, 2017 (#100001398)	407 Third Street; 43°18′01″N 103°49′35″W	Edgemont	
49	Flint Hill Aboriginal Quartzite Quarry	Flint Hill Aboriginal Quartzite Quarry	July 14, 1978 (#78002552)	Address restricted	Edgemont	
50	Hot Springs High School	Hot Springs High School	May 7, 1980 (#80003721)	146 North 16th Street; 43°25′50″N 103°28′51″W	Hot Springs	
51	Hot Springs Historic District	Hot Springs Historic District	June 25, 1974 (#74001890)	Roughly both sides of River St. from Summit Rd. south to Baltimore St., including part of Minnekahta Ave. 43°26′02″N 103°28′38″W	Hot Springs	Boundary decrease approved August 24, 2018.
52	Governor Leslie Jensen House	Governor Leslie Jensen House	September 25, 1987 (#87001731)	309 S. 5th St. 43°25′46″N 103°28′12″W	Hot Springs	
53	Log Cabin Tourist Camp	Log Cabin Tourist Camp	January 28, 2004 (#03001525)	Highway 1; 43°26′38″N 103°28′35″W	Hot Springs	
54	Lord's Ranch Rockshelter	Lord's Ranch Rockshelter	July 14, 2005 (#05000688)	Address restricted	Edgemont	
55	Petty House	Petty House	February 12, 1999 (#99000202)	201 N. 3rd St. 43°26′04″N 103°28′09″W	Hot Springs	
56	St. Martin's Catholic Church and Grotto	St. Martin's Catholic Church and Grotto	May 30, 2005 (#03000764)	Lot Six Block 5; 43°10′48″N 103°13′53″W	Oelrichs	
57	Site No. 39 FA 7	Site No. 39 FA 7	May 20, 1982 (#82004771)	Address restricted	City restricted	
58	Site No. 39 FA 58	Site No. 39 FA 58	May 20, 1982 (#82004765)	Address restricted	City restricted	
59	Site No. 39 FA 75	Site No. 39 FA 75	May 20, 1982 (#82004760)	Address restricted	City restricted	
60	Site No. 39 FA 79	Site No. 39 FA 79	May 20, 1982 (#82004772)	Address restricted	City restricted	
61	Site No. 39 FA 91	Site No. 39 FA 91	May 20, 1982 (#82004773)	Address restricted	City restricted	
62	Site No. 39 FA 94	Site No. 39 FA 94	May 20, 1982 (#82004774)	Address restricted	City restricted	
63	Site No. 39 FA 277	Site No. 39 FA 277	May 20, 1982 (#82004761)	Address restricted	City restricted	
64	Site No. 39 FA 389	Site No. 39 FA 389	May 20, 1982 (#82004762)	Address restricted	City restricted	
65	Site No. 39 FA 554	Site No. 39 FA 554	May 20, 1982 (#82004764)	Address restricted	City restricted	
66	Site No. 39 FA 676	Site No. 39 FA 676	May 20, 1982 (#82004766)	Address restricted	City restricted	
67	Site No. 39 FA 677	Site No. 39 FA 677	May 20, 1982 (#82004767)	Address restricted	City restricted	
68	Site No. 39 FA 681	Site No. 39 FA 681	May 20, 1982 (#82004769)	Address restricted	City restricted	
69	Site No. 39 FA 684	Site No. 39 FA 684	May 20, 1982 (#82004768)	Address restricted	City restricted	
70	Site No. 39 FA 685	Site No. 39 FA 685	May 20, 1982 (#82004906)	Address restricted	City restricted	
71	Site No. 39 FA 687	Site No. 39 FA 687	May 20, 1982 (#82004770)	Address restricted	City restricted	
72	Site 39FA1303	Site 39FA1303	June 8, 2005 (#05000587)	Address restricted	Edgemont	
73	Site 39FA1639	Site 39FA1639	June 9, 2005 (#05000586)	Address restricted	Edgemont	
74	State Soldiers Home Barn	State Soldiers Home Barn	November 5, 2009 (#09000446)	2500 Minnekahta Ave. 43°26′11″N 103°29′18″W	Hot Springs	
75	Phillip Wesch House	Phillip Wesch House	February 23, 1984 (#84003287)	2229 Minnekahta Ave. 43°26′15″N 103°29′24″W	Hot Springs	

== Former listing ==
	Name on the Register	Image	Date listed	Date removed	Location	City or town	Description
1	Edgemont Block		October 24, 1996 (#96001232)	December 16, 2002	610 2nd Avenue	Edgemont	

== See also ==
- List of National Historic Landmarks in South Dakota
- National Register of Historic Places listings in South Dakota
