= Smithwick =

Smithwick may refer to:

== People ==
- Smithwick (surname)

== Places ==
- Smithwick, South Dakota, USA
- Smithwick, Texas, USA

== Other uses ==
- Smithwick's, a brand of Irish beer
- The Smithwick Tribunal, a 21st-century judicial inquiry in Ireland
