= Doc Middleton =

American outlaw

- Born: James Middleton Riley; February 9, 1851; Bastrop, Texas, US
- Died: December 27, 1913 (aged 62); Orin, Wyoming, US
- Other names: Texas Doc; Gold-Tooth Jack
- Occupations: Cowboy, horse and cattle rustler, outlaw, gunman, saloon owner, farmer
- Conviction: Guilty
- Criminal charges: Horse theft, (multiple counts) Murders {1 known}

James Middleton Riley (February 9, 1851 – December 27, 1913), alias David Charles Middleton and better known as Doc Middleton, was a famed outlaw and horse thief in Nebraska.

== Criminal career ==
Middleton stole his first horse at the age of 14. In 1870, he was convicted of murder and was sentenced to life in prison at the Huntsville Prison. In 1874, he escaped the prison.

He was caught stealing horses in Iowa. After serving 18 months, he moved to Sidney, Nebraska, where he shot and killed a soldier, Pvt. James Keith of the 5th Cavalry Regiment, on January 13, 1877, from nearby Fort Sidney in a bar fight. He was arrested but he escaped as a lynch mob gathered.

He was eventually wanted by the Wyoming Stock Growers Association and the Union Pacific Railroad, which offered rewards for his capture. Army officer William H. H. Llewellyn, seeking to protect pony herds on the Pine Ridge Reservation, was dispatched to capture him. Llewellyn, along with an army from detachment under George Crook lured him to a meeting with a promise of a pardon from the governor. In a melee, two of Doc's gang were killed and a lawman named Hazen was wounded but Middleton was captured and was taken to Cheyenne, Wyoming, where he was convicted of grand larceny and served a prison sentence from September 18, 1879, and was released on June 18, 1883. At the time of his 1879 arrest, it was reported that he had stolen thirty-five horses from William Irving of Cheyenne in 1877.

In 1884, he and his third bride moved to Gordon, Nebraska, where he operated a saloon, and was briefly a deputy sheriff.

In 1897, it was reported that he was the City Marshal of Edgemont, South Dakota.

In 1900, he later moved to Gordon, Nebraska. He had a saloon in both Gordon and Ardmore, South Dakota, and he also became the town marshal. In 1913, he moved to Orin Junction, Wyoming, where he opened a saloon. After getting into a knife fight at the bar, he was arrested for dispensing liquor illegally. While in jail, he contracted erysipelas and died. He is buried in Douglas Park Cemetery in Douglas, Wyoming.

== In media ==
A short documentary film aired on Nebraska PBS in 2017 by filmmaker David Higgins (The Aviation Cocktail) called Doc Middleton: The Unwickedest Outlaw. The opening of the short states that Higgins has spent a decade researching the life of the famed Nebraska outlaw. The film uses reenactments and animation, along with interviews from individuals such as Platte County historian Tim Benson, President of the Association of Professional Genealogists Roberta King, Rock County historian Carolyn Hall and Converse County historian Steve Gregersen.
