= South Dakota Highway 471 =

State highway in Fall River County, South Dakota, United States

Highway 471
- SD 471 highlighted in red

Route information
- Maintained by SDDOT
- Length: 21.981 mi (35.375 km)
- Existed: 1976–present

Major junctions
- South end: SD 71 southeast of Rumford
- North end: US 18 in Edgemont

Location
- Country: United States
- State: South Dakota
- Counties: Fall River

Highway system
- South Dakota State Trunk Highway System; Interstate; US; State
← SD 445	→ SD 473

South Dakota Highway 471 (SD 471) is a 21.981-mile (35.375 km) state highway in western Fall River, South Dakota, United States, that connects Highway 71 (SD 71), southeast of Rumford, with U.S. Route 18 (US 18), in Edgemont.

== Route description ==
SD 471 begins at a junction with SD 71 in the Oglala National Grassland. The highway travels northwest through the community of Rumford before turning west and passing through Provo. Here, SD 471 veers north and enters the city of Edgemont as 3rd Street before turning into 2nd Avenue. The designation continues west onto A Street, passing through Edgemont before briefly turning north on 6th Avenue to terminate at US 18.

The section of SD 471 between SD 71 and east of Provo is a gravel road.

=== Legal description ===
The legal description of SD 471 has been codified by the South Dakota Legislature: 31-4-244. State Highway 471 from State Highway 71 to U.S. Highway 18. The state trunk highway system includes the following in Fall River County: From a point on State Highway 71 north of Ardmore near the southeast corner of section eight, township eleven south, range four east, thence northwest via Edgemont to a point on U.S. Highway 18 in Edgemont in the southwest quarter of section thirty-six, township eight south, range two east.

=== Traffic ===
In 2018, the South Dakota Department of Transportation (SDDOT) measured the amount of traffic on its highways in average annual daily traffic. SD 471 had an average of 79 vehicles along its southern section (south of Fort Igloo Road [north of Provo]), an average of 200 vehicles along its mid section (between Fort Igloo Road and A Street in Edgemont), and an average of 1,012 vehicles along A Street in Edgemont.

=== National Highway System ===
SD 471 is not part of the National Highway System (NHS), a system of highways important to the nation's defense, economy, and mobility.

== History ==
SD 471 was designated in 1976. It was previously a portion of Highway 52, which had been used on this route from 1951 to 1975.

== Major intersections ==
The entire route is in Fall River County.

Location	mi	km	Destinations	Notes
	0.000	0.000	SD 71 – Ardmore, Hot Springs	Southern terminus
Edgemont	21.981	35.375	US 18 – Lusk Wyo., Hot Springs	Northern terminus
1.000 mi = 1.609 km; 1.000 km = 0.621 mi

== See also ==
- List of state highways in South Dakota
