= Maverick Junction, South Dakota =

- Census Designated Place
- Location of Maverick Junction in South Dakota.
- Coordinates: 43°24′31″N 103°23′45″W
- Country: United States
- State: South Dakota
- County: Fall River
- Elevation: 3,265 ft (995 m)

Population (2020)
  - Total: 46
- Time zone: UTC-7 (MST)
  - Summer (DST): UTC-6 (MDT)
- Area code: 605
- GNIS feature ID: 2807104

Maverick Junction
- Interactive map of Maverick Junction

Location
- Roads at junction: US 18; US 385; SD 79

Construction
- Maintained by: South Dakota Department of Transportation

Maverick Junction (Lakota: Mniwóblu Oínažiŋ) is an unincorporated community and census-designated place (CDP) located in Fall River County at the intersection of South Dakota Highway 79 and US Highways 18 and 385, approximately five miles southeast of Hot Springs. The population was 46 at the 2020 census.

== History ==
Like many highway intersections in the Black Hills, Maverick Junction has been known by this name for many years; the origin of the name is not known, but is most likely the original name of a truck stop or other business located at this key road junction.

From Maverick Junction:

- Southeast (US 18/385 multiplexed) to Oelrichs then east on US 18 to Pine Ridge or south on US 385 to Chadron, Nebraska.
- North (SD-79) to Buffalo Gap, and Rapid City.
- Northwest (US 18 and US 385 multiplexed) to Hot Springs.

Although located outside the city limits of Hot Springs, businesses and nearby rural residences have a Hot Springs mailing address (Zip Code 57747).

Although a road junction existed here from at least 1926 when SD-79 was first designated, and intersected with SD-50 (modern US-18), the modern road junction developed when US-18/385 and SH-70 were realigned, probably in the early 1960s, to bypass a bridge over Fall River and the still-existent historical truss bridge across the Cheyenne River on what is now County Highway 79-F. This is located west of the current bridge (which is being rebuilt to expand from two lanes to four lanes in the Fall of 2009).

== Local businesses ==
A variety of businesses have been built and operated at the location for many years including stores, restaurants and fuel stations. Other businesses are located around the junction, including light industrial operations such as sand and gravel pits, rental storage, and ready-mix operations. The South Dakota Department of Transportation has a maintenance shop at the Junction. In recent years, the construction of the Heartland Expressway has spurred new businesses to locate at the Junction, including a campground and construction companies.

== Heartland Expressway ==
SH-79 and US-18/385 south of Maverick Junction are part of the Heartland Expressway connecting the eastern side of the Black Hills with Alliance and Scottsbluff, Nebraska, and the Front Range of Colorado. As of the Fall of 2009, the expressway has been completed as a dual-roadway four-lane highway from Rapid City, South Dakota to Maverick Junction, and the next segment south through Oelrichs to the Nebraska stateline, paid for by 19 million dollars in federal funding, plus matching state funds, is now under construction.

Maverick Junction serves as the southeastern entry into the Black Hills, for travelers from the Oglala Sioux Indian Reservation and other reservations to the east (via US-18), and from the Panhandle and much of the rest of Nebraska (via US-385), and as one of two common routes from Colorado. The multiplexed portions of US-18/385 have been known variously as the Grant Highway, the Black Hills Sioux Trail, and the Oyate Trail. SD-79 functions as a high-speed bypass for the southern Black Hills, used in lieu of US-385 and US-16, because it is located in the "Racetrack" that forms the outside edge of the Black Hills and therefore has much better terrain; the four-lane portions of SD-79 are posted at 70 mph, 5 mph above standard South Dakota rural speed limits.

US-18/385 from Maverick Junction to Hot Springs (4.5 miles) is named the Leslie Jensen Memorial Highway in honor of South Dakota's 15th governor, and follows Fall River up the canyon of the same name to the tourist, veteran's services, market, and county town, known for its 1890s architecture and a variety of minor tourist attractions. Hot Springs is also the gateway to Wind Cave National Park.

== Education ==
The school district is Hot Springs School District 23-2.

== Sources ==
- https://web.archive.org/web/20100107191030/http://www.bigbats.biz/about-store.html
- http://southdakota.hometownlocator.com/maps/feature-map,ftc,2,fid,1263113,n,maverick%20junction.cfm
- https://web.archive.org/web/20080709020648/http://earmarks.omb.gov/authorization_earmarks/earmark_189626.html
