= Chilson (surname) =

Chilson is a surname. Notable people with the surname include:

- Llewellyn Chilson (1920–1981), United States Army master
- Olin Hatfield Chilson (1903–1991), United States district judge
- Rob Chilson (born 1945), American science fiction author
- Caleb Chilson (2004), American game developer

== See also ==
- Chilson Bridge, in South Dakota
