= Rumford, South Dakota =

- Unincorporated community
- Location within South Dakota Location within the United States
- Coordinates: 43°07′31″N 103°41′54″W
- Country: United States
- State: South Dakota
- County: Fall River
- Elevation: 3,517 ft (1,072 m)
- Time zone: UTC-7 (Mountain (MST))
  - Summer (DST): UTC-6 (MDT)
- Area code: 605
- FIPS code: 46-56700
- GNIS feature ID: 1262342

Rumford is an unincorporated community in Fall River County, South Dakota, United States. It is located on South Dakota Highway 471, 19 miles (31 km) southeast of Edgemont. Rumford is not tracked by the Census Bureau and shares a ZIP code (57735) with Edgemont and other surrounding towns and rural areas.

Rumford was founded in 1889 when Burlington Northern extended the railroad line and built a station at this location. The railroad company changed the name from Siding No. 5 to Rumford in 1894.

== In popular culture ==
Banjo Dan and the Mid-nite Plowboys included the song "Rumford, South Dakota, is No More" on their 1974 album Snowfall.
