= Dudley, South Dakota =

- Census-designated place
- Location within South Dakota Location within the United States
- Coordinates: 43°18′29″N 103°49′09″W
- Country: United States
- State: South Dakota
- County: Fall River

Area
  - Total: 0.11 sq mi (0.28 km^{2})
  - Land: 0.11 sq mi (0.28 km^{2})
  - Water: 0 sq mi (0.00 km^{2})
- Elevation: 3,429 ft (1,045 m)

Population (2020)
  - Total: 28
  - Density: 262.5/sq mi (101.36/km^{2})
- Time zone: UTC-7 (Mountain (MST))
  - Summer (DST): UTC-6 (MDT)
- ZIP Code: 57735 (Edgemont)
- Area code: 605
- FIPS code: 46-17215
- GNIS feature ID: 2807103

Dudley is an unincorporated community and census-designated place (CDP) in Fall River County, South Dakota, United States. The population was 28 at the 2020 census. It was first listed as a CDP prior to the 2020 census.

The community is in the western part of the county, 1 mile (1.6 km) northeast of Edgemont. It is bordered to the south by the Cheyenne River, an east-flowing tributary of the Missouri River. It is bordered to the west by the BNSF Railway and to the north by an abandoned line of the Burlington Northern Railroad, now part of the George S. Mickelson Trail.

U.S. Route 18 passes just north of Dudley, leading northeast 23 miles (37 km) to Hot Springs and west the same distance to Mule Creek Junction, Wyoming.

== Demographics ==
Historical population
Census	Pop.	Note	%±
2020	28		—
U.S. Decennial Census

== Education ==
The school district is Edgemont School District 23-1.
