= Arthur and Ellen Colgan House =

Historic house in South Dakota, United States

- U.S. National Register of Historic Places
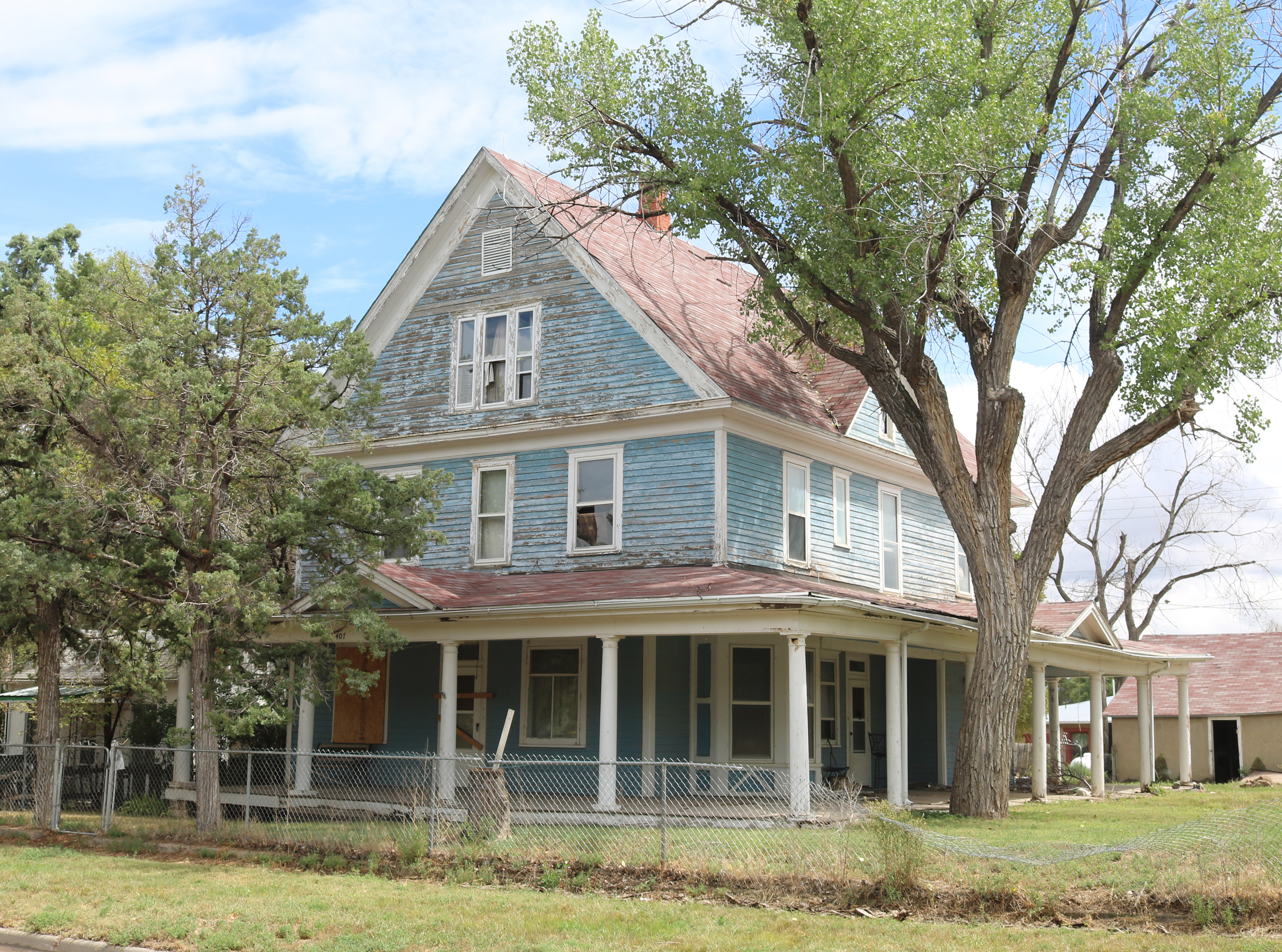
- The property in 2020

- Location within South Dakota Location within the United States
- Location: 407 Third Street, Edgemont, South Dakota
- Coordinates: 43°18′01″N 103°49′35″W
- Built: c.1900
- Architectural style: Queen Anne, Colonial Revival
- NRHP reference No.: 100001398
- Added to NRHP: July 31, 2017

The Arthur and Ellen Colgan House, at 407 Third Street in Edgemont, South Dakota, was listed on the National Register of Historic Places in 2017.

The house was built in 1900. It has a wraparound porch, and according to the South Dakota State Historical Society, its architecture reflects the then-ongoing transition between the Queen Anne and Colonial Revival styles.

The Colgans owned general merchandise stores in Oelrichs and in Edgemont.
