= Heartland Expressway =

Highway corridor in the United States

- High Priority Corridor 14
- Heartland Expressway highlighted in red

Route information
- Length: 567 mi (912 km)
- Existed: 1988–present
- Component highways: SH 71 from Limon, CO to the CO-NE line; I-76 from Denver, CO to Brush, CO; N-71 from the CO-NE line to Scottsbluff, NE; US 26 from Guernsey, WY to Bayard, NE; L-62A from Bayard, NE to Angora, NE; US 385 from Angora, NE to Maverick Junction, SD; SD 79 from Maverick Junction, SD to Rapid City, SD

Major junctions
- South end: I-70 / US 24 / US 40 / US 287 at Limon, CO
- I-25 / I-70 / I-270 / US 6 / US 36 / US 85 / US 87 in Denver, CO; I-76 / US 6 at Brush, CO; I-80 / US 30 at Kimball, NE; I-25 / US 87 at Guernsey, WY; US 26 at Bayard, NE; US 385 at Angora, NE; US 20 at Chadron, NE; US 18 at Oelrichs, SD; US 18 / US 385 at Maverick Junction, SD
- North end: I-90 / US 14 / US 16 Truck in Rapid City, SD

Location
- Country: United States
- States: Colorado; Nebraska; South Dakota; Wyoming

Highway system
- High-Priority Corridors

The Heartland Expressway (also known as National Highway System High Priority Corridor 14) is a federally-designated highway corridor between Limon, Colorado, and Rapid City, South Dakota, in the United States. The corridor functions as the central third of the Ports-to-Plains Alliance, connecting the Ports-to-Plains Corridor and Theodore Roosevelt Expressway via the Nebraska panhandle. Construction is currently underway to upgrade the corridor to four lanes. When completed, the highway will provide multi-lane, divided-highway access to cities including Alliance, Nebraska; Scottsbluff, Nebraska; and Brush, Colorado, bringing long-term economic development and reducing travel times in the region.

The proposed $500 million highway is part of a larger project that would create an international trade corridor from Canada to Mexico for the region's abundant energy and agricultural products, with local community leaders long promoting its completion. Up to $943 million in economic benefits is estimated for the region over a 38-year span as a result of the project, through increased traffic volume, travel time savings, improved connections among trade centers, better labor access, improved access to manufacturing centers, better connections between agricultural centers and markets, better access between raw materials and processors, better access for tourists to local fossil sites, and bring an estimated average of $2.5 million annual savings from accident reduction, 385-950 additional annual jobs, and $9.5 million to $24.8 million in annual earnings.

== History ==
The project started in 1988, as part of the Nebraska Expressway System program. The Intermodal Surface Transportation Efficiency Act of 1991 made it the National Highway System High Priority Corridor 14. However, parts of the program were delayed, including the Heartland Expressway. The long-delayed highway was estimated in 2012 to cost more than $500 million and take 20 years to complete, according to preliminary estimates for the project, with an estimated time of finalizing the highway in the fall of 2018. The project took its first big step when a new interchange was built linking Interstate 80 with about 47 miles (76 km) of expressway between Kimball, Nebraska, and Scottsbluff, Nebraska. The highway has been under construction.

== Future ==
The alignment of the Heartland Expressway follows existing highways, with the project consisting of improvements.

- Widen U.S. Route 26 (US 26) to a four-lane divided highway from Torrington, Wyoming, to County Road 10 (CR 10) east of Morrill, Nebraska.
- Widen US 26 to a four-lane divided highway from CR 30 in Minatare, Nebraska, to the US 26/L62A junction.
- Widen L62A to four lanes with median from US 26/L62A split to US 385.
- Widen US 385 to four lanes with median from L62A to Nebraska Highway 2 (NE 2) in Alliance, Nebraska
- Improve US 385 into a super-2 facility to include 12-foot (3.7 m) lanes, 10-foot (3.0 m) shoulders, auxiliary turn lanes, and passing lanes from NE 2 to US 20 in Chadron, Nebraska. This should be constructed in accordance to the super-2 criteria. The ultimate roadway section would include a four-lane highway when traffic volumes warrant the four-lane section.
- Improve the intersection of US 385 and US 20.
- Improve US 385 into a super-2 facility to include 12-foot (3.7 m) lanes, 10-foot (3.0 m) shoulders, auxiliary turn lanes, and passing lanes from US 20 west of Chadron, Nebraska to Oelrichs, South Dakota.
- Additional major safety and bottleneck improvements.
- Long-term plans may include routing the extension of Interstate 27 along this route.
