= Hot Springs High School =

Hot Springs High School may refer to:

- Hot Springs High School (Arkansas) listed on the NRHP in Hot Springs, Arkansas
- Hot Springs High School (Montana) in Hot Springs, Montana
- Hot Springs High School (New Mexico) in Hot Springs, New Mexico
- Hot Springs High School (South Dakota) in Hot Springs, South Dakota
- Hot Springs County High School in Thermopolis, Wyoming
