= Hot Springs School District =

Hot Springs School District may refer to:

- Hot Springs School District (Arkansas)
- Hot Springs School District (South Dakota)
