= Ardmore, South Dakota =

Unincorporated community in South Dakota, US

Ardmore is an unincorporated community and census-designated place (CDP) in Fall River County, South Dakota, United States. The town was founded in 1889 by European-American settlers. The population was 1 at the 2020 census.

== Description ==
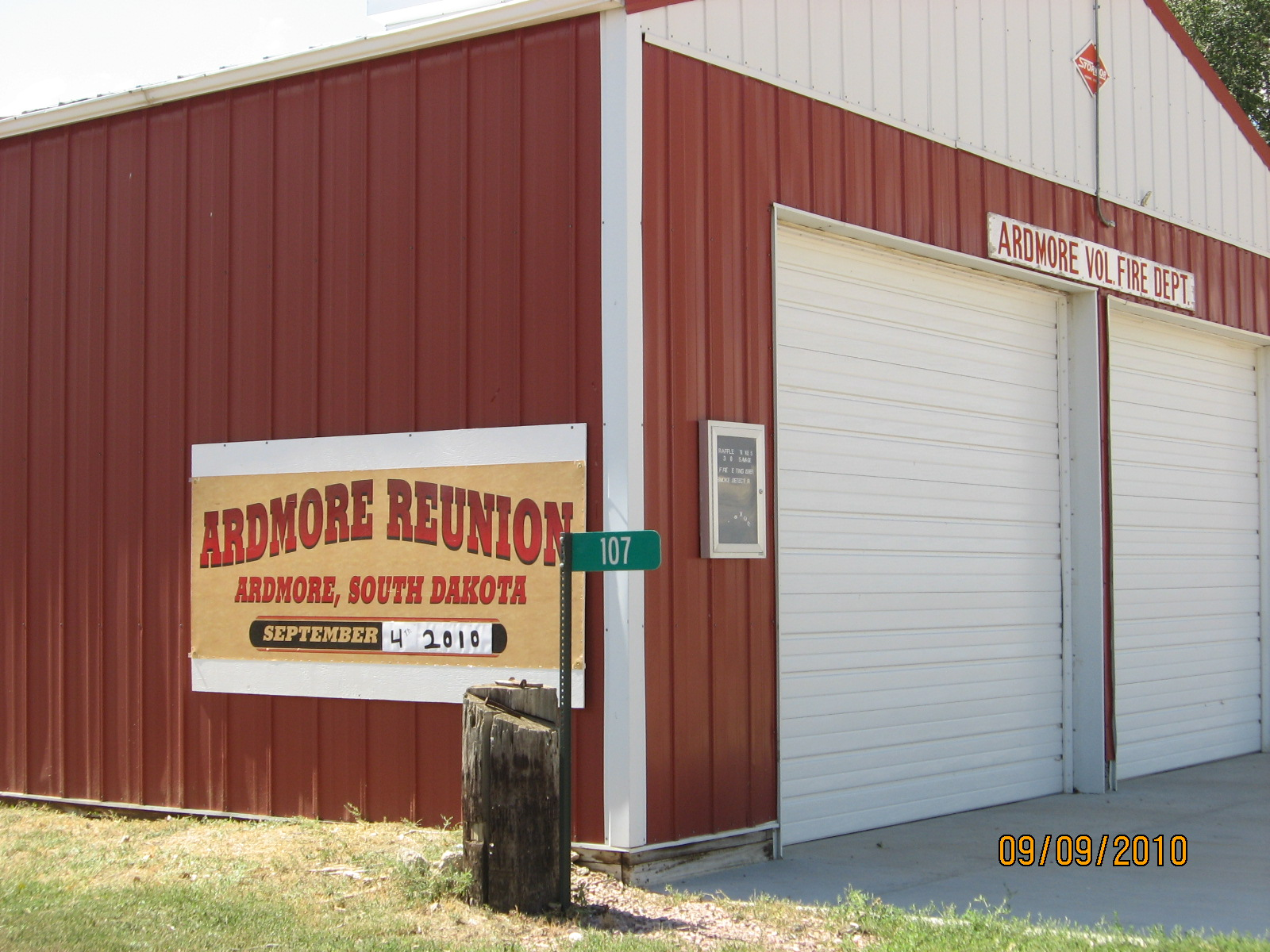
2010 Reunion of the Ardmore Volunteer Fire Department

The community is located at coordinates 43°01′09″N 103°39′15″W at an elevation of 3,556 feet.

The community is believed to have been derived from the name of Dora Moore, a local teacher.

Ardmore was featured in the May 2004 issue of National Geographic Magazine. The community is located approximately one mile (1.6 km) north of the South Dakota–Nebraska border along South Dakota Highway 71. It is located next to a stretch of BNSF railroad. Approximately 15-25 abandoned houses have survived at the site. The town sign is still standing.

== History ==
In 1927, President Calvin Coolidge stopped in Ardmore while lodged at Custer State Park.

The town survived the Great Depression without any families receiving welfare assistance. The decline of agriculture and moving of young people to other areas for work reduced the population. The 1980 census recorded a population of 16 residents.

Ardmore celebrated a reunion on September 4, 2010, at the Ardmore Volunteer Fire Department.

== Education ==
The school district is Edgemont School District 23-1.

== Notable person ==
- Doc Middleton, a former resident and infamous outlaw
