= William H. H. Llewellyn =

American politician (1851–1927)

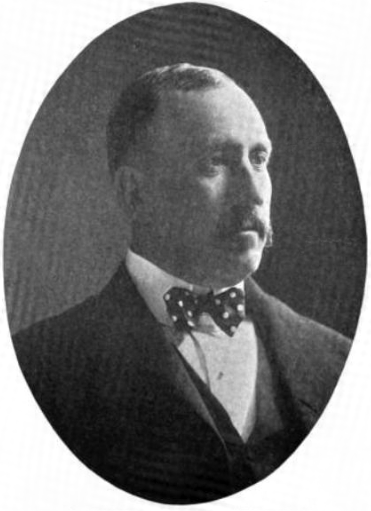

Member of the New Mexico House of Representatives
- In office 1901–1903

Speaker of the New Mexico House of Representatives
- In office 1897

Personal details
- Born: William Henry Harrison Llewellyn; September 9, 1851; Monroe, Wisconsin
- Died: June 11, 1927 (aged 75); El Paso, Texas
- Political party: Republican
- Spouse: Ida Little (m. 1878)
- Children: 7
- Education: Tabor College
- Occupation: Lawyer, politician

William Henry Harrison Llewellyn (September 9, 1851 – June 11, 1927) was a member of the New Mexico House of Representatives.

== Biography ==
Llewellyn was born on September 9, 1851, in Monroe, Wisconsin. He attended Tabor College. On March 9, 1878, Llewellyn married Ida Little. They had seven children. Llewellyn was a member of the Episcopal Church.

During the Spanish–American War, Llewellyn and his son, Morgan, served with the Rough Riders in the United States Army under the command of future U.S. President Theodore Roosevelt. During this time, he played a prominent role in the Battle of San Juan Hill. After the war, he served as Judge Advocate General of the New Mexico National Guard. He retired with the rank of colonel.

Llewellyn died at the William Beaumont Army Medical Center on June 11, 1927. He is buried in Las Cruces, New Mexico.

== Political career ==
From 1877 to 1885, Llewellyn was an Indian agent. While in this role, he worked to protect the local Sioux from Doc Middleton.

In 1897, Llewellyn was Speaker of the House of Representatives of the New Mexico Territory. He was again a member of the House of Representatives from 1901 to 1903. From 1905 to 1907, he was U.S. Attorney of the territory, having been appointed by Theodore Roosevelt. During this same time, Roosevelt appointed Llewellyn's son Morgan to be Surveyor General of the New Mexico Territory. After the territory achieved statehood, Llewellyn was a member of the New Mexico House of Representatives in 1912.

Additionally, Llewellyn was a delegate to the Republican National Convention in 1884, 1896 and 1904.
