= Provo Township, Fall River County, South Dakota =

Township in Fall River County, South Dakota

Coordinates: 43.16720°N 103.86880°W

Provo Township is one of the three townships of Fall River County, South Dakota, United States; most of the rest of the county is unorganized territory. The township lies in the southwestern part of the county.
