= Oral, South Dakota =

- Unincorporated community
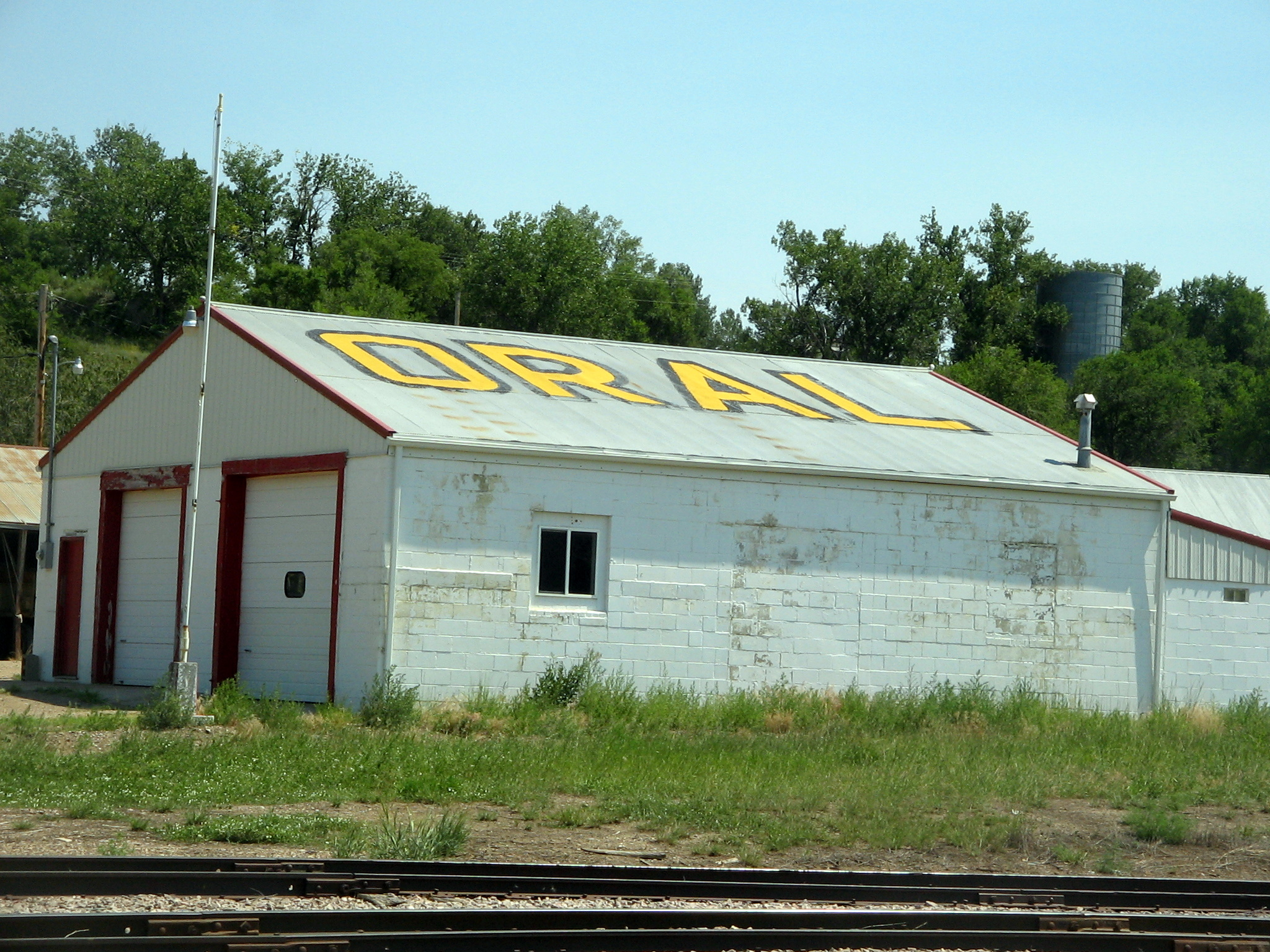
- Rooftop in Oral

- Location within the state of South Dakota Oral (the United States)
- Coordinates: 43°24′33″N 103°15′25″W
- Country: United States
- State: South Dakota
- County: Fall River

Area
  - Total: 1.68 sq mi (4.35 km^{2})
  - Land: 1.68 sq mi (4.34 km^{2})
  - Water: 0.0077 sq mi (0.02 km^{2})
- Elevation: 2,969 ft (905 m)

Population (2020)
  - Total: 66
  - Density: 39.4/sq mi (15.22/km^{2})
- Time zone: UTC-6 (Mountain (MST))
  - Summer (DST): UTC-5 (CDT)
- ZIP codes: 57766
- FIPS code: 46-47340
- GNIS feature ID: 2807105

Oral is an unincorporated community and census-designated place (CDP) in Fall River County, South Dakota, United States. The population was 66 at the 2020 census.

Oral has been assigned the ZIP Code of 57766.

== Demographics ==
Historical population
Census	Pop.	Note	%±
2020	66		—
U.S. Decennial Census

== History ==
A post office called Oral has been in operation since 1894. Some say Oral is the middle name of the first postmaster's son, (John Oral Goodman, later of Riverton, WY) while others believe the community was so named with the expectation the place would become something people would be talking about.

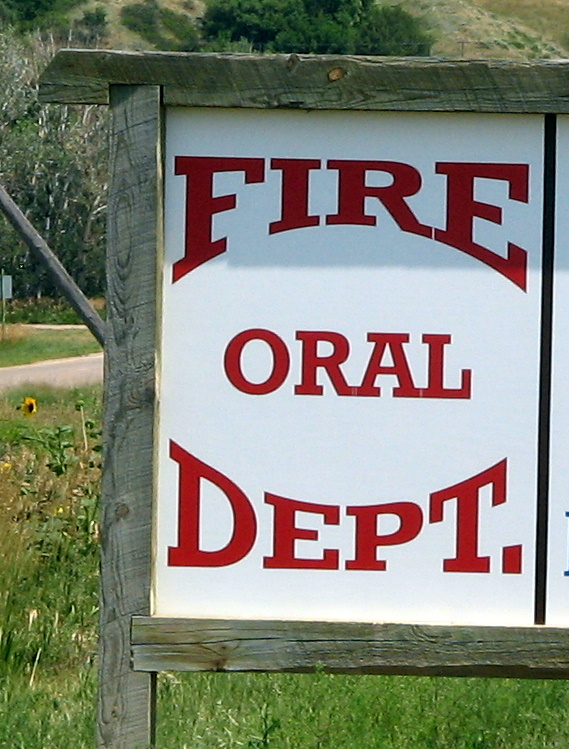
Sign in Oral

== Climate ==
According to the Köppen Climate Classification system, Oral has a cold semi-arid climate, abbreviated "BSk" on climate maps. The hottest temperature recorded in Oral was 112 °F (44.4 °C) on July 7, 1973, while the coldest temperature recorded was −43 °F (−41.7 °C) on December 21, 1983 and December 24, 1983.

Climate data for Oral, South Dakota, 1991–2020 normals, extremes 1971–present
Month	Jan	Feb	Mar	Apr	May	Jun	Jul	Aug	Sep	Oct	Nov	Dec	Year
Record high °F (°C)	74 (23)	73 (23)	84 (29)	94 (34)	99 (37)	109 (43)	112 (44)	108 (42)	104 (40)	94 (34)	83 (28)	71 (22)	112 (44)
Mean maximum °F (°C)	59.0 (15.0)	62.7 (17.1)	76.1 (24.5)	83.2 (28.4)	90.9 (32.7)	98.4 (36.9)	102.5 (39.2)	101.4 (38.6)	97.6 (36.4)	86.6 (30.3)	72.7 (22.6)	60.3 (15.7)	103.9 (39.9)
Mean daily maximum °F (°C)	38.2 (3.4)	41.2 (5.1)	51.7 (10.9)	60.2 (15.7)	69.4 (20.8)	80.4 (26.9)	89.0 (31.7)	87.9 (31.1)	79.1 (26.2)	63.9 (17.7)	49.9 (9.9)	39.7 (4.3)	62.6 (17.0)
Daily mean °F (°C)	24.8 (−4.0)	27.1 (−2.7)	36.4 (2.4)	44.9 (7.2)	55.0 (12.8)	65.3 (18.5)	72.6 (22.6)	70.5 (21.4)	61.0 (16.1)	47.4 (8.6)	35.2 (1.8)	26.1 (−3.3)	47.2 (8.5)
Mean daily minimum °F (°C)	11.3 (−11.5)	12.9 (−10.6)	21.1 (−6.1)	29.5 (−1.4)	40.6 (4.8)	50.2 (10.1)	56.1 (13.4)	53.2 (11.8)	42.8 (6.0)	31.0 (−0.6)	20.5 (−6.4)	12.6 (−10.8)	31.8 (−0.1)
Mean minimum °F (°C)	−12.8 (−24.9)	−12.2 (−24.6)	2.4 (−16.4)	14.4 (−9.8)	26.5 (−3.1)	39.1 (3.9)	45.6 (7.6)	42.4 (5.8)	31.0 (−0.6)	14.9 (−9.5)	0.9 (−17.3)	−9.3 (−22.9)	−22.5 (−30.3)
Record low °F (°C)	−34 (−37)	−38 (−39)	−32 (−36)	−5 (−21)	15 (−9)	32 (0)	36 (2)	31 (−1)	17 (−8)	−8 (−22)	−21 (−29)	−43 (−42)	−43 (−42)
Average precipitation inches (mm)	0.38 (9.7)	0.56 (14)	0.86 (22)	2.03 (52)	3.30 (84)	3.05 (77)	2.35 (60)	2.01 (51)	1.45 (37)	1.28 (33)	0.53 (13)	0.40 (10)	18.20 (462)
Average snowfall inches (cm)	5.6 (14)	7.1 (18)	5.6 (14)	5.2 (13)	1.2 (3.0)	0.0 (0.0)	0.0 (0.0)	0.0 (0.0)	0.0 (0.0)	1.8 (4.6)	3.7 (9.4)	6.6 (17)	36.8 (93)
Average extreme snow depth inches (cm)	5.0 (13)	4.5 (11)	4.0 (10)	3.0 (7.6)	0.5 (1.3)	0.0 (0.0)	0.0 (0.0)	0.0 (0.0)	0.0 (0.0)	1.2 (3.0)	2.6 (6.6)	4.3 (11)	9.0 (23)
Average precipitation days (≥ 0.01 in)	3.4	4.5	5.2	8.0	11.2	10.9	8.4	6.9	5.8	5.7	3.3	3.6	76.9
Average snowy days (≥ 0.1 in)	3.0	3.9	2.7	1.8	0.3	0.0	0.0	0.0	0.0	0.8	2.0	3.5	18.0
Source 1: NOAA
Source 2: National Weather Service

== Education ==
The school district is Hot Springs School District 23-2.
