= South Dakota Highway 445 =

North-South state highway

Highway 445
- Deadwood Avenue
- SD 445 highlighted in red

Route information
- Maintained by SDDOT
- Length: 2.372 mi (3.817 km)
- Existed: 1975–present

Major junctions
- South end: SD 231 in Rapid City
- North end: I-90 / US 14 / SD 79 in Rapid City

Location
- Country: United States
- State: South Dakota
- Counties: Pennington County

Highway system
- South Dakota State Trunk Highway System; Interstate; US; State
| ← SD 407 | → SD 471 |

South Dakota Highway 445 (SD 445), also known as Deadwood Avenue, is a 2.4-mile-long (3.9 km) north–south state highway in Rapid City, South Dakota. Lying in the northwestern corner of the city, it connects Interstate 90 (I-90) with the downtown area.

== Route description ==
SD 445 begins at an intersection with SD 231 (W Chicago Street / W Omaha Street) in Rapid City's Westside, just across Rapid Creek and the Dakota Hogback from downtown. It heads northwest as a four-lane undivided highway to pass through an industrial area. The highway curves more northward, passing the former Lien Airport as it travels through a more commercial district. SD 445 narrows to two-lanes immediately before coming to an end at its interchange with I-90 / US 14 / SD 79 (exit 55); Deadwood Avenue continues north. The entire length of SD 445 lies within the Rapid City city limits.

All of SD 445 is legally defined via South Dakota Codified Law § 31-4-243.

== Major intersections ==
The entire route is in Rapid City, Pennington County.

| mi | km | Destinations | Notes |
|---|---|---|---|
| 0.00 | 0.00 | SD 231 (W Chicago Street / W Omaha Street) to I-90 BL / SD 44 – Downtown | Southern terminus |
| 2.372 | 3.817 | I-90 / US 14 / SD 79 – Gillette, Sioux Falls | Northern terminus; I-90 exit 55 |
1.000 mi = 1.609 km; 1.000 km = 0.621 mi
