= South Dakota Highway 71 =

State highway in Fall River County, South Dakota, United States

Highway 71
- Cascade Road
- SD 71 highlighted in red

Route information
- Maintained by SDDOT
- Length: 34.535 mi (55.579 km)
- Existed: 1962–present

Major junctions
- South end: N-2 / N-71 northwest of Crawford, NE
- North end: US 18 Byp. in Hot Springs

Location
- Country: United States
- State: South Dakota
- Counties: Fall River

Highway system
- South Dakota State Trunk Highway System; Interstate; US; State
← SD 65	→ SD 73

South Dakota Highway 71 (SD 71) is a 34.535-mile (55.579 km) state highway in Fall River County, South Dakota, United States, that travels from the Nebraska state line (where it continues as N-2/N-71 through the Black Hills National Forest) to U.S. Route 18 Bypass (US 18 Byp.) in Hot Springs. It is part of a triple state highway serving South Dakota, Nebraska, and Colorado.

== Route description ==
SD 71's southern terminus is at the Nebraska border in Black Hills National Forest where it has the same number.

In the forest, the route meets the terminus of South Dakota Highway 471. After that, it leaves the forest and ends at US 18 Byp. in Hot Springs.

== History ==
The road was originally commissioned in 1936 as part of South Dakota Highway 87. Part of that highway was given the SD 71 designation in 1962.

== Major intersections ==
The entire highway is in Fall River County.

Location	mi	km	Destinations	Notes
Unorganized Territory of Southwest Fall River	0.000	0.000	N-2 south / N-71 south – Crawford	Continuation beyond Nebraska state line
	7.816	12.579	SD 471 north – Edgemont	Southern terminus of SD 471
Hot Springs	34.535	55.579	US 18 Byp. (Indianapolis Avenue) – The Mammoth Site, Civic Center	Northern terminus of SD 71
1.000 mi = 1.609 km; 1.000 km = 0.621 mi

== See also ==
- List of state highways in South Dakota
