= St. Martin's Catholic Church and Grotto =

Historic church in South Dakota, United States

- U.S. National Register of Historic Places
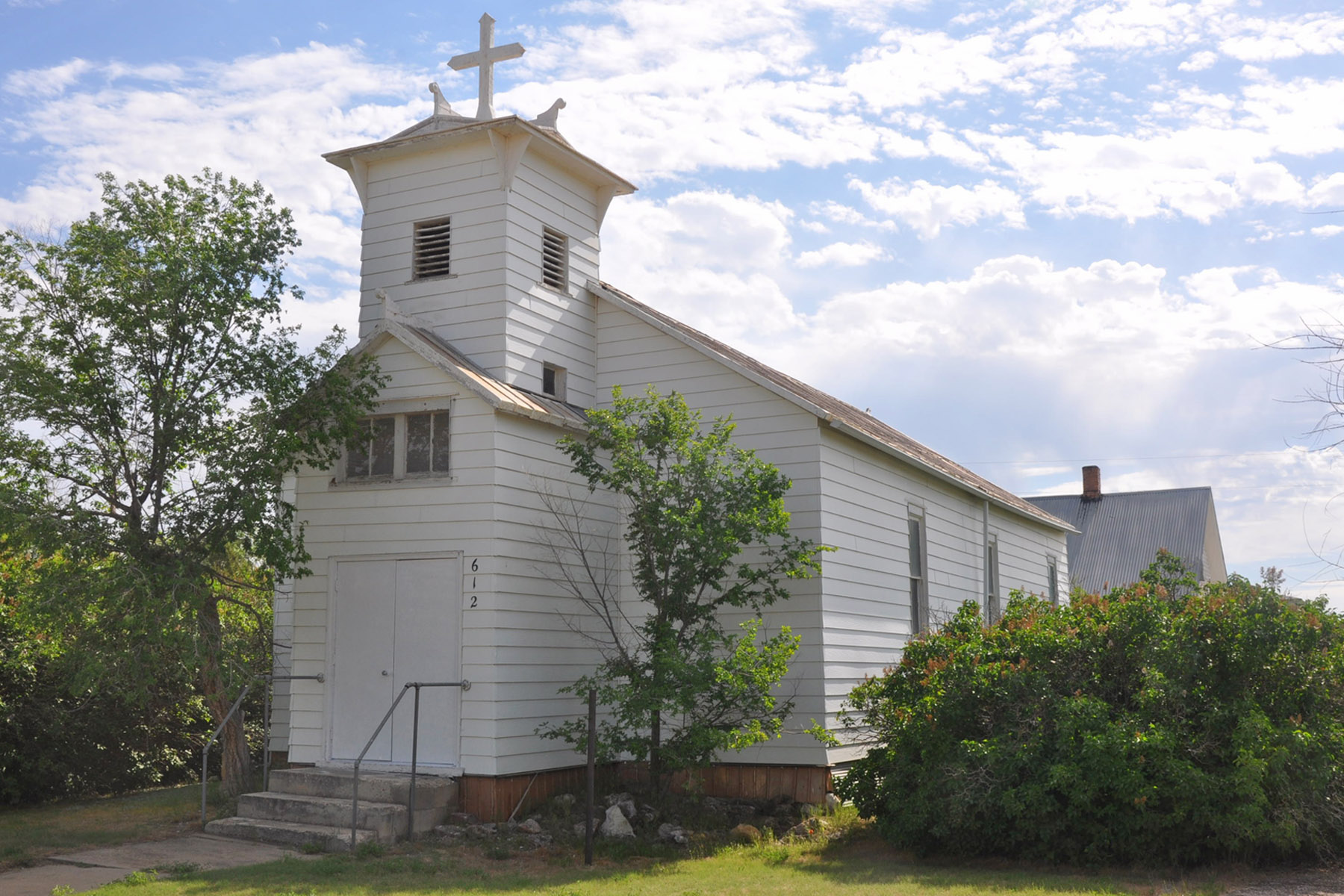

- Location within South Dakota Location within the United States
- Location: 612 Main St; Oelrichs, South Dakota
- Coordinates: 43°10′48.1″N 103°13′53″W
- Area: less than one acre
- Architect: Stakemeir, Father Gerhard; Works Progress Administration
- Architectural style: Late 19th And Early 20th Century American Movements
- NRHP reference No.: 03000764
- Added to NRHP: May 30, 2005

St. Martin's Catholic Church and Grotto is a historic church complex located at 612 Main St in Oelrichs, South Dakota. It features Late 19th and Early 20th Century American Movement architecture and was added to the National Register of Historic Places in 2005.

The church, built in 1885, is a single story church on a stone foundation. The rectory, built in 1925, is one and one-half stories. The grotto was built by Father Gerhard Stakemeir and Nick Bogner, a parishioner, in 1932–1934.

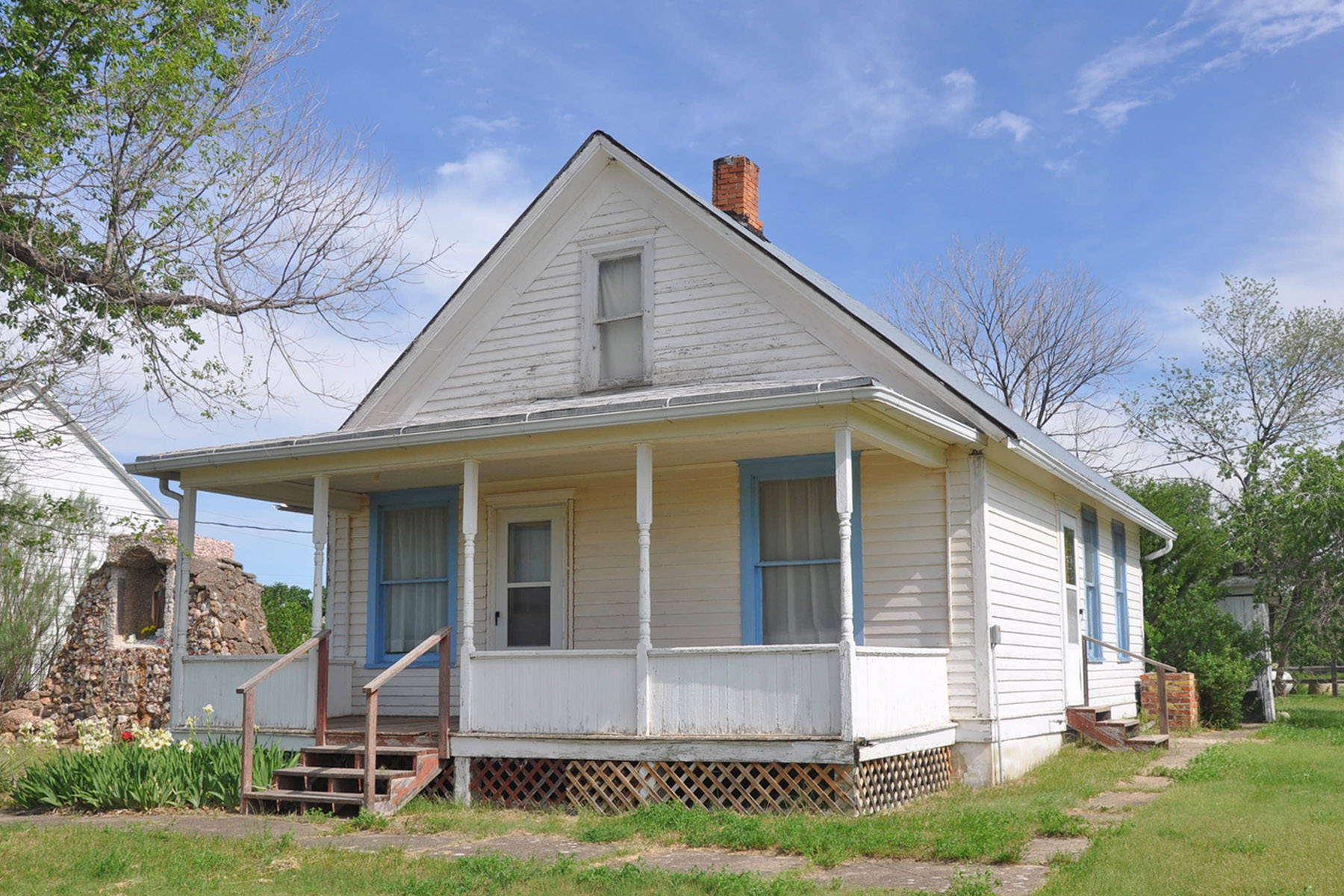
Rectory

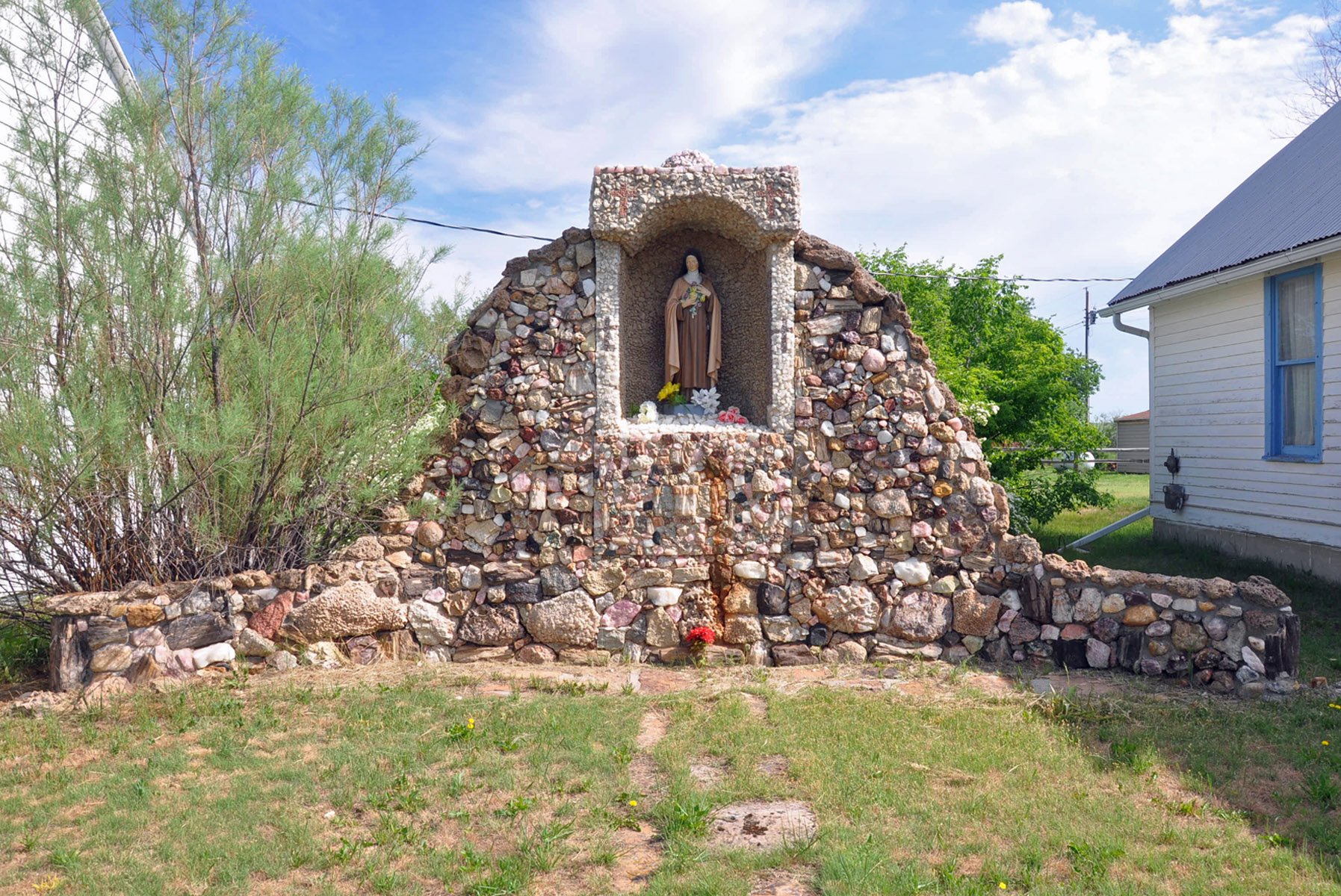
Grotto

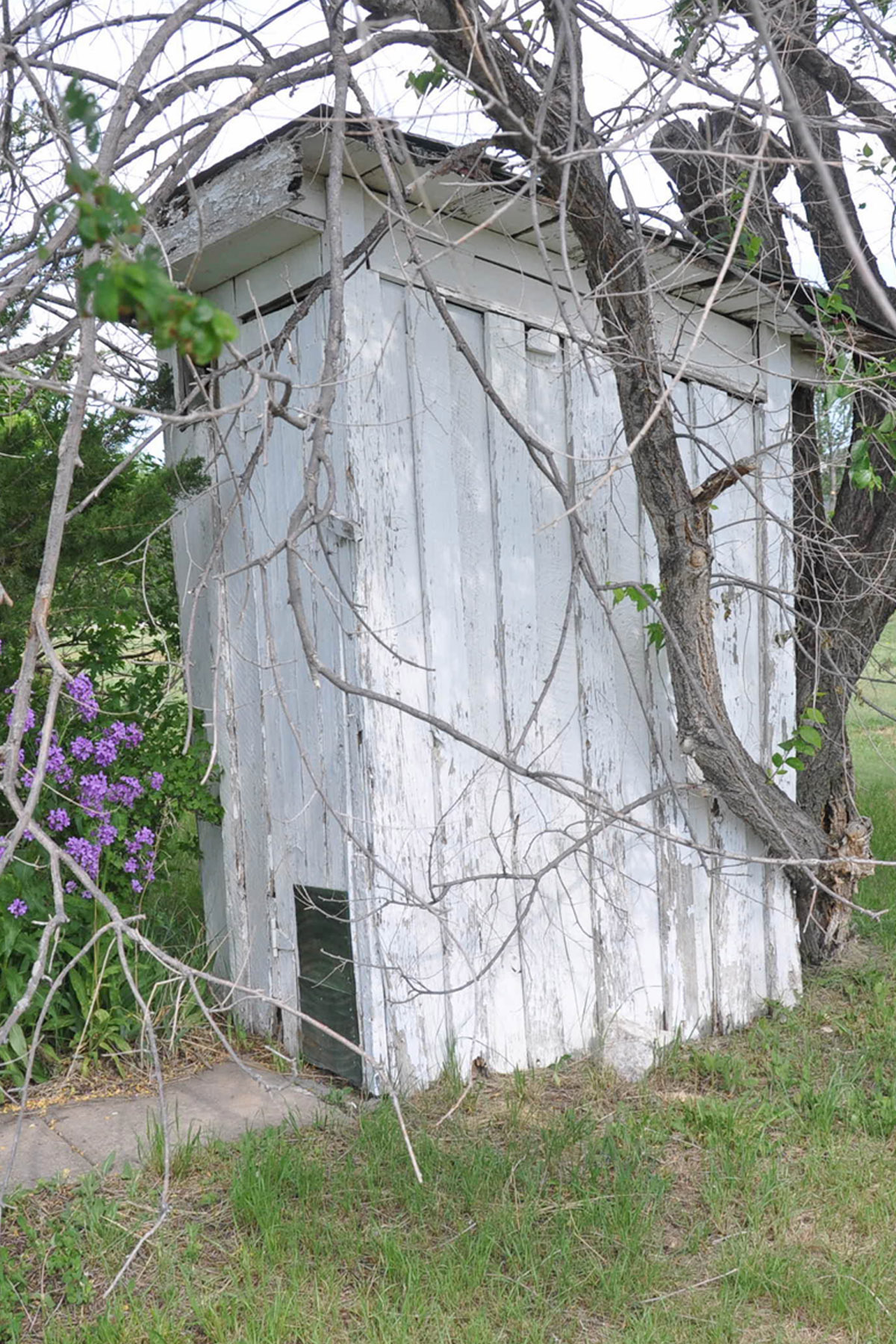
Privy
