= Robins Township, Fall River County, South Dakota =

Township in Fall River County, South Dakota

Coordinates: 43.25190°N 103.15960°W

Robins Township is one of the three townships of Fall River County, South Dakota, United States; most of the rest of the county is unorganized territory. The township lies in the eastern part of the county.
