= Hot Springs School District (South Dakota) =

School district in South Dakota, United States

The Hot Springs School District is a public school district based in Fall River County, South Dakota.

The Hot Springs High School serves grades 9–12 in the city of Hot Springs. It is located at 1609 University Avenue, at the corner of 16th St. The school's mascot is The Bisons. The building of the high school building at 146 N. 16th St., which was built in 1925, is listed on the National Register of Historic Places.

43°25′50″N 103°28′52″W

The Hot Springs Middle School is located behind the high school, on the same property.

The Hot Springs Elementary School is located nearby, at 240 N. 19th Street in Hot Springs.
