= Ports-to-Plains Alliance =

Advocacy group

Ports-to-Plains Alliance Logo

The Ports-to-Plains Alliance, based in Lubbock, Texas, United States, is a non-profit bipartisan advocacy group led by mayors, councillors, and other local elected leaders, economic development officials, business, and other opinion leaders from nine states (Texas, New Mexico, Oklahoma, Colorado, North Dakota, South Dakota, Montana, Nebraska, and Wyoming) and one Canadian province (Alberta) which contains a 2,378-mile-long (3,827 km) economic development corridor stretching from Texas to Alberta.

The alliance was formalized in 2009 through an agreement between groups representing three congressionally-designated High Priority Corridors on the U.S. National Highway System (NHS): the Ports-to-Plains Trade Corridor Coalition, the Heartland Expressway Association, and the Theodore Roosevelt Expressway Association. Today, as the Ports-to-Plains Alliance, the coalition works to assure continued prosperity in communities throughout North America’s energy and agricultural heartland.

== Aims ==
The alliance promotes trade, investment, infrastructure development, and intermodal connectivity in the Ports-to-Plains region. Originally, each individual group lobbied the U.S. Congress, the White House, and state governments for highway improvement dollars, with largely-local goals in mind.

Today, the Ports-to-Plains Alliance is a forum for collaboration and a partnership for maximizing the potential of the region and its people. The alliance raises funds to sustain and improve the Ports-to-Plains regional intermodal transportation network.
