= The Aviation Cocktail =

- Film poster
- Directed by: David R. Higgins
- Written by: David R. Higgins
- Produced by: Bobby Deline; David R. Higgins
- Starring: Michael Haskins; Brandon Eaton; Beau Kiger; Leah Lockhart
- Cinematography: Mark Rutledge
- Edited by: Patrick Behan
- Music by: Wilson Helmericks
- Production company: Pilot's Lounge
- Distributed by: Indie Rights
- Release dates: September 21, 2012 (Calgary Film Festival); October 5, 2012
- Country: United States
- Language: English

The Aviation Cocktail is a 2012 independent American drama film directed by David R. Higgins and starring Michael Haskins, Brandon Eaton, Beau Kiger, and Leah Lockhart. The plot is about the entangled lives of three World War II veterans living in the Midwestern United States in the 1950s. The film's title refers to a famous drink, the aviation.

== Plot ==
The film follows the lives of 3 three World War II veterans living in a rural midwestern town in 1958. It opens on pilot Jack Fisher (Michael Haskins), who gets a call from his sheriff brother Henry (Beau Kiger) with word about a suspected serial killer he has been tracking. They arrive to find the brothers' longtime friend Bob Halloran (Brandon Eaton), has a posse formed in a standoff with the suspect holding a young girl hostage in a barn. Once the posse discovers the hostage is dead, they unload bullets into the barn, injuring the suspect. The Fisher brothers and Halloran load the bleeding suspect into Jack's plane, but a decision is made during the flight that propels mounting tension between the 3 men.

A psychological aftermath unravels from the personal torment each of them deals with, as well as tensions from the estranged behavior of the victims' brother, Dale Riley, which leads to suspicions. As the story progresses, we see that the characters' idyllic family lives only disguise a reality of lies and betrayal.

== Cast ==
- Jack Fisher as Michael Haskins
- Bob Halloran as Brandon Eaton
- Henry Fisher as Beau Kiger
- Alice Fisher as Leah Lockhart
- Connor Boyle as Dale Riley
- June Fisher as Katie Bevard
- Geoff Hadley as Mark Hanson
- Sam Fisher as Holden Mundorf

== Production ==
The film's principal photography was in Valentine, Nebraska, and scenes were also shot in Colorado. Valentine was chosen as the primary location as an ideal setting for the story, but also because the city supported the production through the Economic Development Board, via Nebraska Senator Colby Coash's film incentive bill LB863, investing $5,000 for the $40,000 to $45,000 the production spent locally.

== Release ==
The film was selected for screening at a number of North American film festivals, including its world premiere at the Calgary International Film Festival, September 21, 2012. In October 2012, the film screened at the Gotham Screen Film Festival & Screenplay Contest in New York, and in November at the Denver Film Festival, its Colorado premiere, where much of the cast and crew resides. In January 2013 it screened at the Trail Dance Film Festival in Oklahoma, and then in February 2013 in premiered in Valentine, Nebraska, where most of the film was shot. The Omaha Film Festival also screened the film in March 2013. The film is currently available on VOD and DVD.

== Awards ==
Festival	Award	Category
Trail Dance Film Festival	Golden Drover	Best Feature Narrative
