= Battle Mountain Sanitarium =

- Battle Mountain Sanitarium, National Home for Disabled Volunteer Soldiers
- U.S. National Register of Historic Places
- U.S. National Historic Landmark District
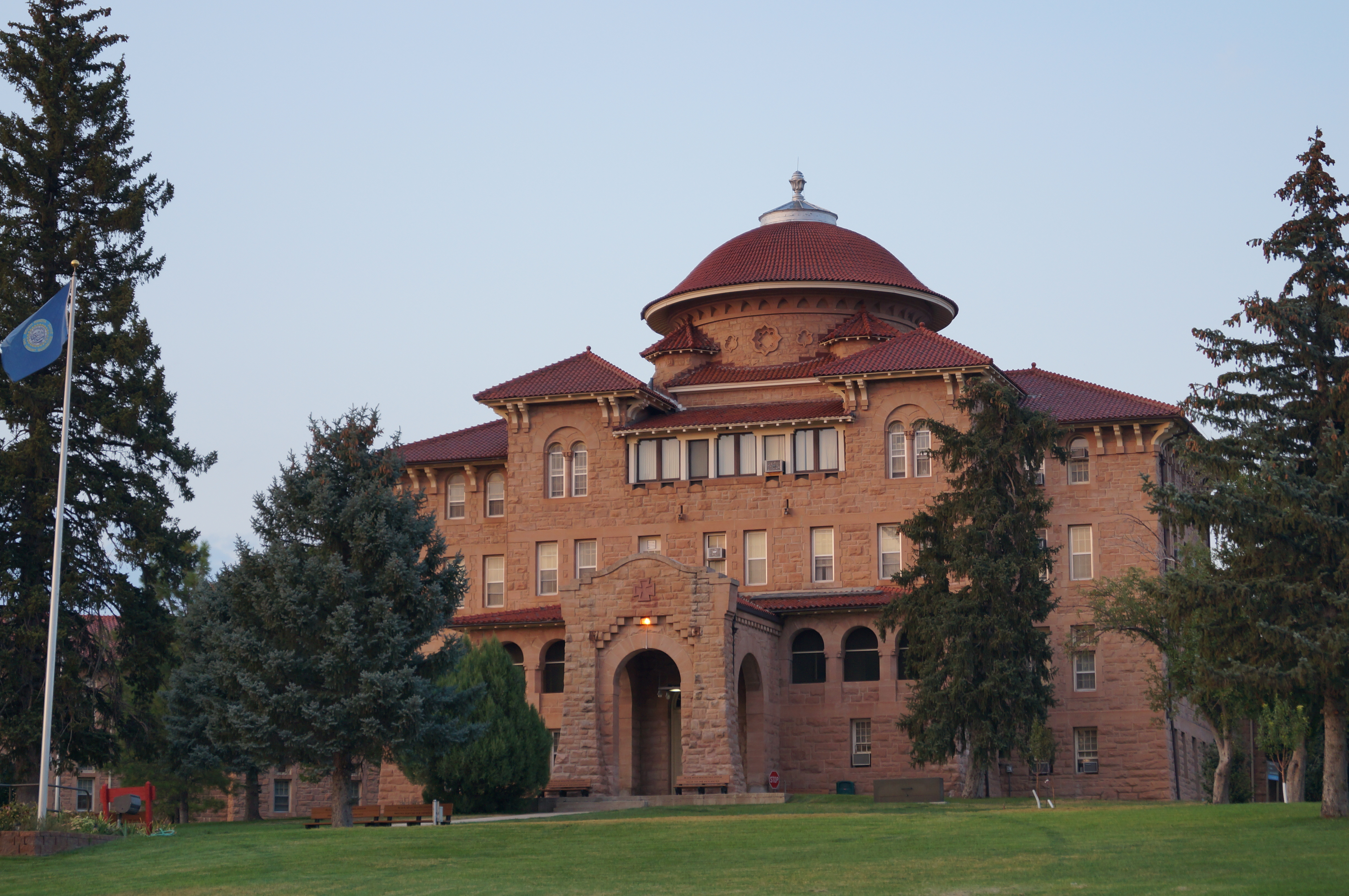

- Location within South Dakota Location within the United States
- Location: 500 North 5th St., Hot Springs, South Dakota
- Coordinates: 43°26′11″N 103°28′44″W
- NRHP reference No.: 11000561

Significant dates
- Added to NRHP: June 17, 2011
- Designated NHLD: June 17, 2011

The Battle Mountain Sanitarium was a division of the National Home for Disabled Volunteer Soldiers (NHDVS) located in Hot Springs, South Dakota. Established by law in 1902 and opened in 1907, it was unique among the facilities of the NHDVS, a precursor of today's United States Department of Veterans Affairs (VA), in that it was strictly a medical facility with no residential components beyond its treatment facilities. It was founded to treat former soldiers suffering from musculo-skeletal problems that were believed to be treatable by the region's mineral springs, and for conditions such as tuberculosis whose treatment was improved by the thin dry air. The facilities built for the sanitarium are in an architecturally distinctive Romanesque and Mission Revival style, and now form the centerpiece of the Black Hills Health Care facility, operated by the VA. Most of the complex site was designated a National Historic Landmark in 2011 for its architecture and history.

== Description and history ==
The Battle Mountain Sanitarium campus is located on the northeast side of Hot Springs, on 68 acres (28 ha) (reduced from the original more than 100) set on a bluff overlooking the Fall River. The grounds, laid out in the early 20th century, were designed by landscape architect George Kessler of Kansas City, Missouri, and the original buildings were designed by Thomas Rogers Kimball of Omaha, Nebraska. Kimball's buildings are built out of locally quarried pink sandstone, and are a distinctive blend of the Mission Revival and the Richardsonian Romanesque, which were popular styles in Hot Springs at the time. The unique combination of materials, design and setting give the complex a striking appearance. The main building has a circular central structure with spoke-like wings radiating away.

The city of Hot Springs developed in the 1880s as a resort community, with visitors drawn to the restorative and curative properties of its mineral springs. Local citizens and political leaders lobbied the federal government for the placement of a branch of the NHDVS. Congress authorized its establishment in 1902, and one of the local spring operators agreed to supply the facility with water from its springs. Ground was broken on the site, and it opened for its first patients in 1907. From its inception, it served as a treatment facility for former soldiers whose conditions were thought to be treatable either by consuming or bathing in the waters of the hot springs. It was also considered a good place for the treatment of tuberculosis, although its facilities as designed were less than ideal for this purpose. In 1930 the facility was transitioned to the VA, and was gradually transformed into a more general-purpose medical facility. Some of its facilities, including some of its tuberculosis wards, were demolished.

== See also ==
- National Register of Historic Places listings in Fall River County, South Dakota
- National Historic Landmarks in South Dakota
