= Chilson Bridge =

- U.S. National Register of Historic Places
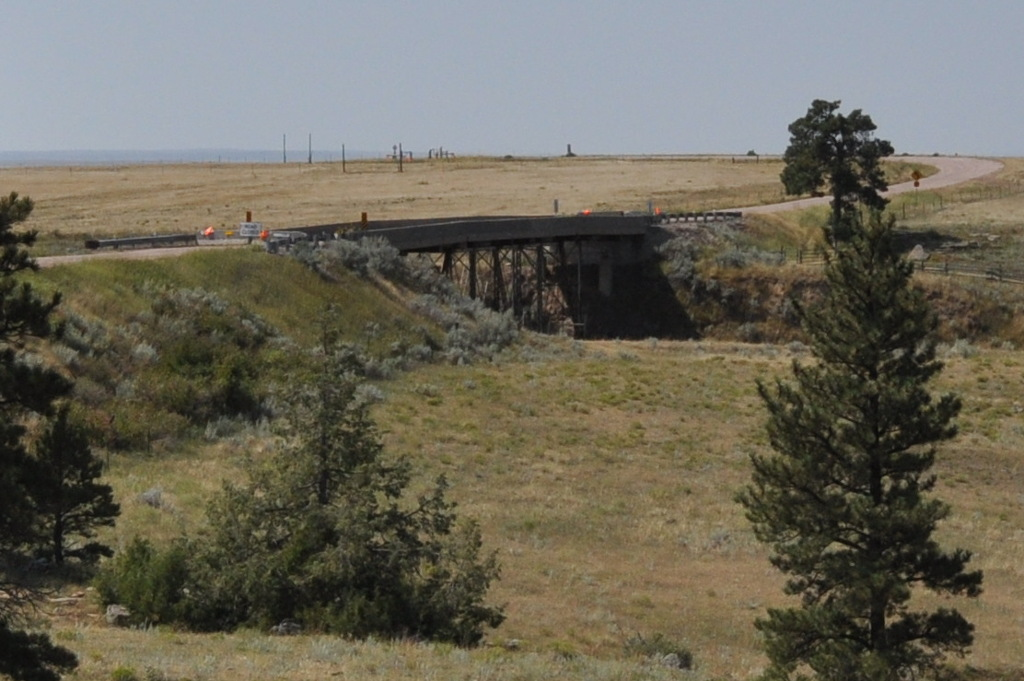

- Location within South Dakota Location within the United States
- Nearest city: Edgemont, South Dakota
- Coordinates: 43°19′47″N 103°44′02″W
- Area: less than one acre
- Built: 1929
- Architect: South Dakota State Highway Department
- Architectural style: Pratt deck truss
- MPS: Historic Bridges in South Dakota MPS
- NRHP reference No.: 93001287
- Added to NRHP: December 9, 1993

The Chilson Bridge, near Edgemont, South Dakota, is a bridge which brings a local road, formerly U.S. Highway 18, over BNSF railroad tracks. It was built in 1929 and was listed on the National Register of Historic Places in 1993. It has also been denoted as South Dakota Dept. of Transportation Bridge No. 24-162-102

It is a 103 feet (31 m) pin-connected Pratt truss deck bridge. It is located 4.0 miles east and 1.8 miles north of Edgemont.

The bridge has been closed to vehicular traffic.

Bridge rebuilt and reopened in July 2023
