= Smithwick (surname) =

Smithwick is a surname. Notable people with the surname include:

- Emma Smithwick, English TV producer
- Frederick Smithwick (1879–1962), Irish rugby international
- Gladys Smithwick (1898–1964), American medical missionary
- Hugh Smithwick (1918–1990), American football player and coach
- Jan Smithwick (born 1952), Australian basketball player
- John Francis Smithwick (1844–1913) Irish businessman and politician
- John H. Smithwick (1872–1948), American politician
- Noah Smithwick (1808–1899), Texas colonist
- Peter Smithwick (1937–2022), Irish judge
