= Smithwick, South Dakota =

- Unincorporated community
- Location within the state of South Dakota Smithwick (the United States)
- Coordinates: 43°17′51″N 103°12′59″W
- Country: United States
- State: South Dakota
- County: Fall River

Area
  - Total: 1.93 sq mi (5.01 km^{2})
  - Land: 1.93 sq mi (5.01 km^{2})
  - Water: 0 sq mi (0.00 km^{2})
- Elevation: 3,248 ft (990 m)

Population (2020)
  - Total: 39
  - Density: 20.2/sq mi (7.79/km^{2})
- Time zone: UTC-7 (Mountain Time)
  - Summer (DST): UTC-6 (MDT)
- ZIP codes: 57782
- FIPS code: 46-59620
- GNIS feature ID: 2807107

Smithwick is an unincorporated community and census-designated place (CDP) in Fall River County, South Dakota, United States. The population was 39 at the 2020 census. Smithwick has been assigned the ZIP code of 57782.

== History ==
A post office called Smithwicks was established in 1887, and in 1901 the name was changed to Smithwick. Smithwick was named for a railroad engineer.

== Demographics ==
Historical population
| Census | Pop. | Note | %± |
|---|---|---|---|
| 2020 | 39 | | — |
U.S. Decennial Census

== Education ==
The school district for almost all of Smithwick is Oelrichs School District 23-3. A small piece is in Hot Springs School District 23-2.
