= Fall River County, South Dakota =

County in South Dakota, United States

- County
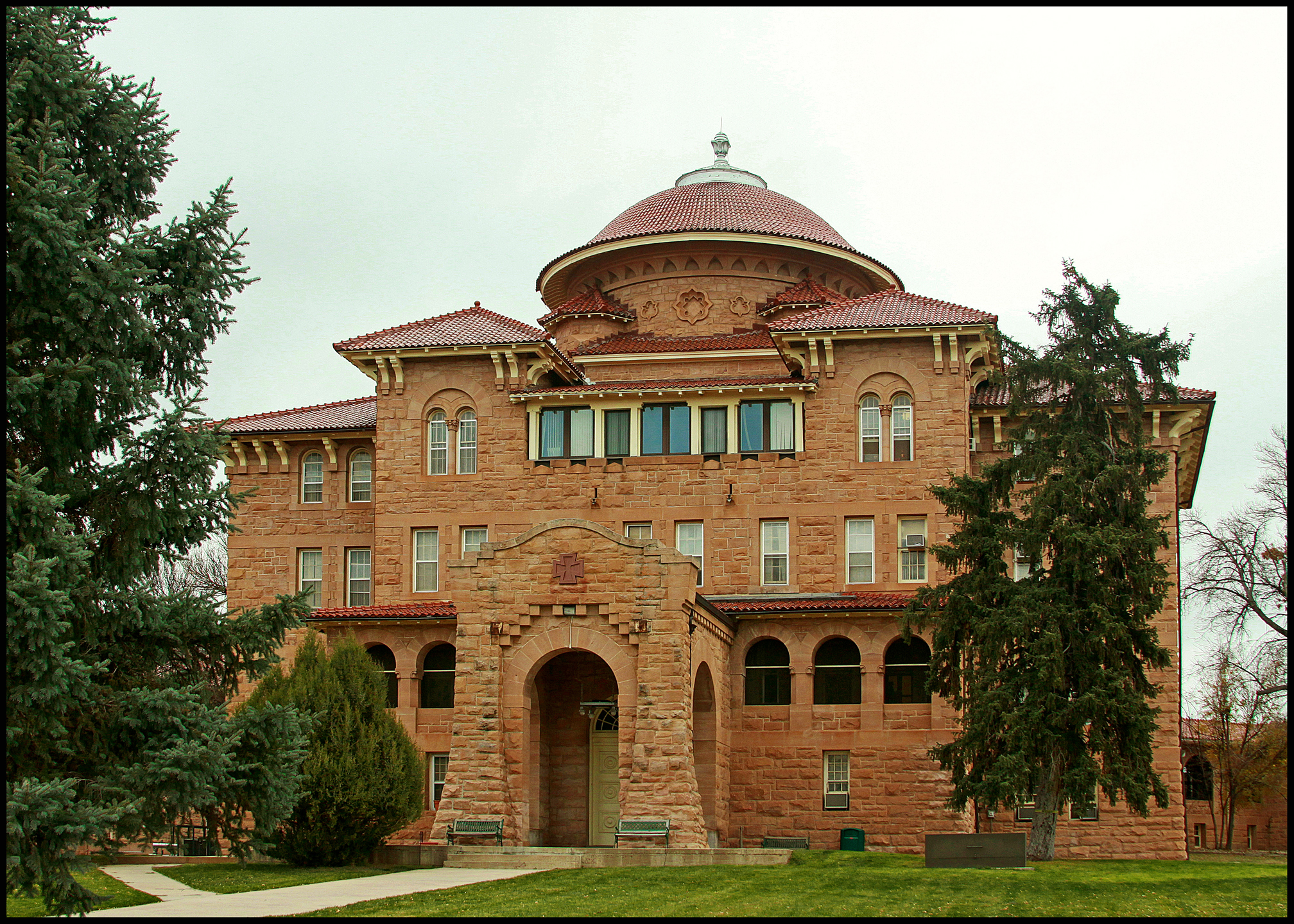
- Battle Mountain Sanitarium in Hot Springs.

- Location within the U.S. state of South Dakota
- Coordinates: 43°15′N 103°31′W
- Country: United States
- State: South Dakota
- Founded: April 3, 1883
- Named for: Fall River
- Seat: Hot Springs
- Largest city: Hot Springs

Area
  - Total: 1,749 sq mi (4,530 km^{2})
  - Land: 1,740 sq mi (4,500 km^{2})
  - Water: 9.2 sq mi (24 km^{2}) 0.5%

Population (2020)
  - Total: 6,973
  - Estimate (2025): 7,467 ▲
  - Density: 4.01/sq mi (1.55/km^{2})
- Time zone: UTC−7 (Mountain)
  - Summer (DST): UTC−6 (MDT)
- Congressional district: At-large
- Website: fallrivercountysd.gov

Fall River County is a county in the U.S. state of South Dakota. As of the 2020 census, the population was 6,973. Its county seat is Hot Springs. The county was founded in 1883. It is named for the Fall River which runs through it.

== Geography ==
Fall River County lies at South Dakota's SW corner. Its south borderline abuts the north borderline of the state of Nebraska, and its west borderline abuts the east borderline of the state of Wyoming. The Fall River County terrain contains a mountainous area in the north-central portion, with rolling hills in the rest of the county. Outside the mountainous area, the county's highest point is its SW corner, at 3,970 ft (1,210 m) ASL. Of the several peaks in the mountainous area, one in the NE portion of that zone rises to 4,646 ft (1,416 m) ASL. The terrain slopes to the north and east. Discharging from the Angostura Reservoir, the Cheyenne River flows northeasterly through the upper part of the county, departing the county through its north boundary line into Custer County.

Fall River County has a total area of 1,749 square miles (4,530 km^{2}), of which 1,740 square miles (4,500 km^{2}) is land and 9.2 square miles (24 km^{2}) (0.5%) is water.

=== Major highways ===
- US 18
- US 385
- SD 71
- SD 79
- SD 89
- SD 471

=== Adjacent counties ===
- Custer County – north
- Oglala Lakota County – east
- Dawes County, Nebraska – southeast
- Sioux County, Nebraska – south
- Niobrara County, Wyoming – west

=== Protected areas ===
- Angostura Reservoir State Game Production Area
- Angostura State Recreation Area
- Bailey State Lakeside Use Area
- Battle Mountain State Game Production Area
- Black Hills National Forest (partial)
- Buffalo Gap National Grassland (partial)
- Friendshuh State Game Production Area (partial)
- Hill Ranch State Game Production Area
- Oral State Game Production Area
- Romey State Game Production Area
- Scherbarth State Game Production Area
- Sheps Canyon State Lakeside Use Area
- Sheps Canyon State Recreation Area
- Williams Dam State Game Production

=== Lakes ===
- Angostura Reservoir
- Coldbrook Lake
- Cottonwood Springs Lake

== Demographics ==
Historical population
Census	Pop.	Note	%±
1890	4,478		—
1900	3,541		−20.9%
1910	7,763		119.2%
1920	6,985		−10.0%
1930	8,741		25.1%
1940	8,089		−7.5%
1950	10,439		29.1%
1960	10,688		2.4%
1970	7,505		−29.8%
1980	8,439		12.4%
1990	7,353		−12.9%
2000	7,453		1.4%
2010	7,094		−4.8%
2020	6,973		−1.7%
2025 (est.)	7,467	▲	7.1%
U.S. Decennial Census; 1790–1960 1900–1990; 1990–2000 2010–2020

=== 2020 census ===
As of the 2020 census, there were 6,973 people, 3,226 households, and 1,891 families residing in the county. The population density was 4.0 inhabitants per square mile (1.5/km^{2}). Of the residents, 17.2% were under the age of 18 and 32.4% were 65 years of age or older; the median age was 55.1 years. For every 100 females there were 101.0 males, and for every 100 females age 18 and over there were 99.9 males. The racial makeup of the county was 85.9% White, 0.5% Black or African American, 6.0% American Indian and Alaska Native, 0.7% Asian, 0.8% from some other race, and 5.9% from two or more races. Hispanic or Latino residents of any race comprised 2.6% of the population.

There were 3,226 households in the county, of which 19.1% had children under the age of 18 living with them and 26.0% had a female householder with no spouse or partner present. About 36.2% of all households were made up of individuals and 19.5% had someone living alone who was 65 years of age or older.

There were 4,081 housing units, of which 21.0% were vacant. Among occupied housing units, 72.8% were owner-occupied and 27.2% were renter-occupied. The homeowner vacancy rate was 3.9% and the rental vacancy rate was 13.0%.

=== 2010 census ===
As of the 2010 census, there were 7,094 people, 3,272 households, and 1,899 families in the county. The population density was 4.1 inhabitants per square mile (1.6/km^{2}). There were 4,191 housing units at an average density of 2.4 units per square mile (0.93 units/km^{2}). The racial makeup of the county was 88.6% white, 7.1% American Indian, 0.7% black or African American, 0.4% Asian, 0.3% from other races, and 2.9% from two or more races. Those of Hispanic or Latino origin made up 2.2% of the population. In terms of ancestry, 39.7% were German, 12.6% were Irish, 11.2% were English, 8.4% were Norwegian, 5.9% were Dutch, and 2.3% were American.

Of the 3,272 households, 20.4% had children under the age of 18 living with them, 46.2% were married couples living together, 8.9% had a female householder with no husband present, 42.0% were non-families, and 37.6% of all households were made up of individuals. The average household size was 2.10 and the average family size was 2.74. The median age was 50.5 years.

The median income for a household in the county was $35,833 and the median income for a family was $53,750. Males had a median income of $36,495 versus $32,058 for females. The per capita income for the county was $21,574. About 11.4% of families and 17.4% of the population were below the poverty line, including 11.3% of those under age 18 and 21.3% of those age 65 or over.

== Communities ==
=== Cities ===
- Edgemont
- Hot Springs

=== Town ===
- Oelrichs

=== Census-designated places ===
- Angostura
- Ardmore
- Dudley
- Maverick Junction
- Oral
- Provo
- Smithwick

=== Other communities ===
- Burdock (ghost town)
- Cascade Springs (ghost town)
- Heppner (ghost town)
- Rumford

=== Townships ===
- Argentine
- Provo
- Robins

=== Unorganized territories ===
- Northeast Fall River
- Southwest Fall River

== Politics ==
Fall River voters have been reliably Republican for decades. In no national election since 1936 has the county selected the Democratic Party presidential candidate.

United States presidential election results for Fall River County, South Dakota
Year	Republican		Democratic		Third party(ies)	
Year	No.	%	No.	%	No.	%
1892	569	53.73%	262	24.74%	228	21.53%
1896	530	48.67%	555	50.96%	4	0.37%
1900	521	54.96%	421	44.41%	6	0.63%
1904	777	71.22%	248	22.73%	66	6.05%
1908	726	57.62%	466	36.98%	68	5.40%
1912	0	0.00%	712	42.16%	977	57.84%
1916	668	40.63%	922	56.08%	54	3.28%
1920	1,236	61.01%	680	33.56%	110	5.43%
1924	1,392	52.13%	342	12.81%	936	35.06%
1928	2,216	63.51%	1,258	36.06%	15	0.43%
1932	1,351	33.53%	2,603	64.61%	75	1.86%
1936	1,876	47.11%	1,927	48.39%	179	4.50%
1940	2,420	63.27%	1,405	36.73%	0	0.00%
1944	1,938	63.33%	1,122	36.67%	0	0.00%
1948	2,037	59.72%	1,348	39.52%	26	0.76%
1952	2,863	73.96%	1,008	26.04%	0	0.00%
1956	2,377	67.39%	1,150	32.61%	0	0.00%
1960	2,492	63.60%	1,426	36.40%	0	0.00%
1964	2,026	54.29%	1,706	45.71%	0	0.00%
1968	1,843	59.57%	965	31.19%	286	9.24%
1972	2,374	67.89%	1,107	31.66%	16	0.46%
1976	2,046	56.60%	1,537	42.52%	32	0.89%
1980	2,831	69.61%	982	24.15%	254	6.25%
1984	2,748	70.37%	1,135	29.07%	22	0.56%
1988	2,002	58.59%	1,380	40.39%	35	1.02%
1992	1,533	40.84%	1,416	37.72%	805	21.44%
1996	1,636	47.31%	1,357	39.24%	465	13.45%
2000	2,185	63.72%	1,133	33.04%	111	3.24%
2004	2,413	62.76%	1,326	34.49%	106	2.76%
2008	2,348	61.64%	1,338	35.13%	123	3.23%
2012	2,258	64.22%	1,140	32.42%	118	3.36%
2016	2,511	70.47%	821	23.04%	231	6.48%
2020	2,878	71.20%	1,053	26.05%	111	2.75%
2024	3,135	73.35%	1,030	24.10%	109	2.55%

== Education ==
School districts include:

- Edgemont School District 23-1
- Hot Springs School District 23-2
- Oelrichs School District 23-3

== See also ==
- National Register of Historic Places listings in Fall River County, South Dakota
