= Phillip Wesch House =

Historic house in South Dakota, United States

- U.S. National Register of Historic Places
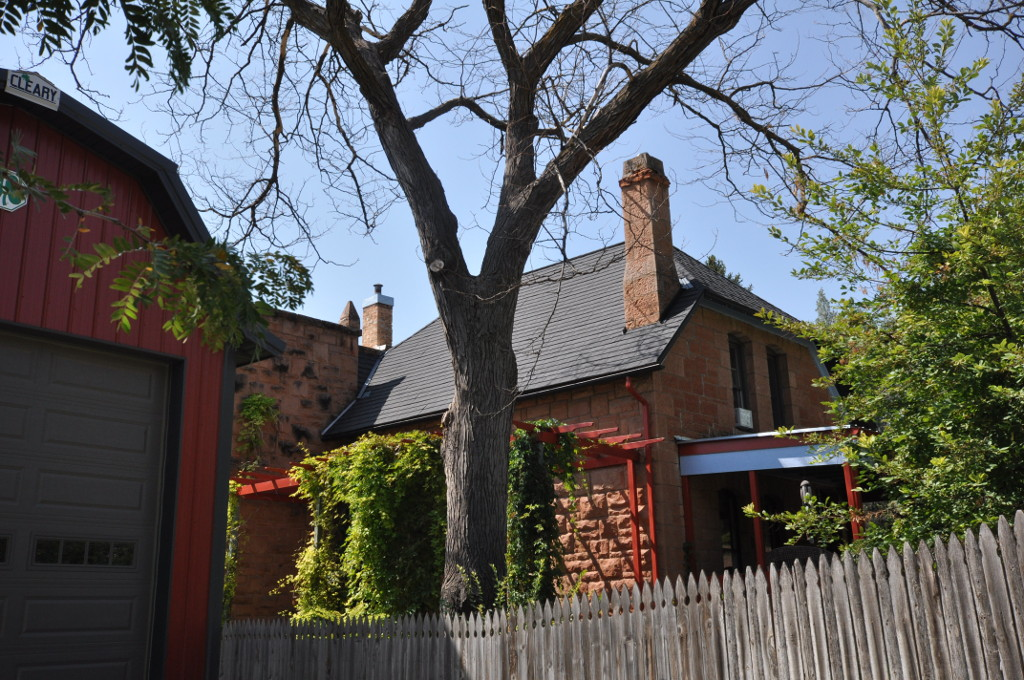

- Location within South Dakota Location within the United States
- Location: 2229 Minnekahta, Hot Springs, South Dakota
- Coordinates: 43°26′15″N 103°29′24″W
- Area: 1 acre (0.40 ha)
- Built: 1890
- Built by: Wesch, Phillip
- NRHP reference No.: 84003287
- Added to NRHP: February 23, 1984

The Phillip Wesch House, located at 2229 Minnekahta in Hot Springs, South Dakota is a historic house built in 1890. It was listed on the National Register of Historic Places in 1984.

It is a two-story pink sandstone house, with a shingled Jerkin head roof. It is a work of stonemason Phillip Wesch. Stone blocks are 18 to 22 inches thick.
