= Hot Springs High School (South Dakota) =

Historic high school in South Dakota

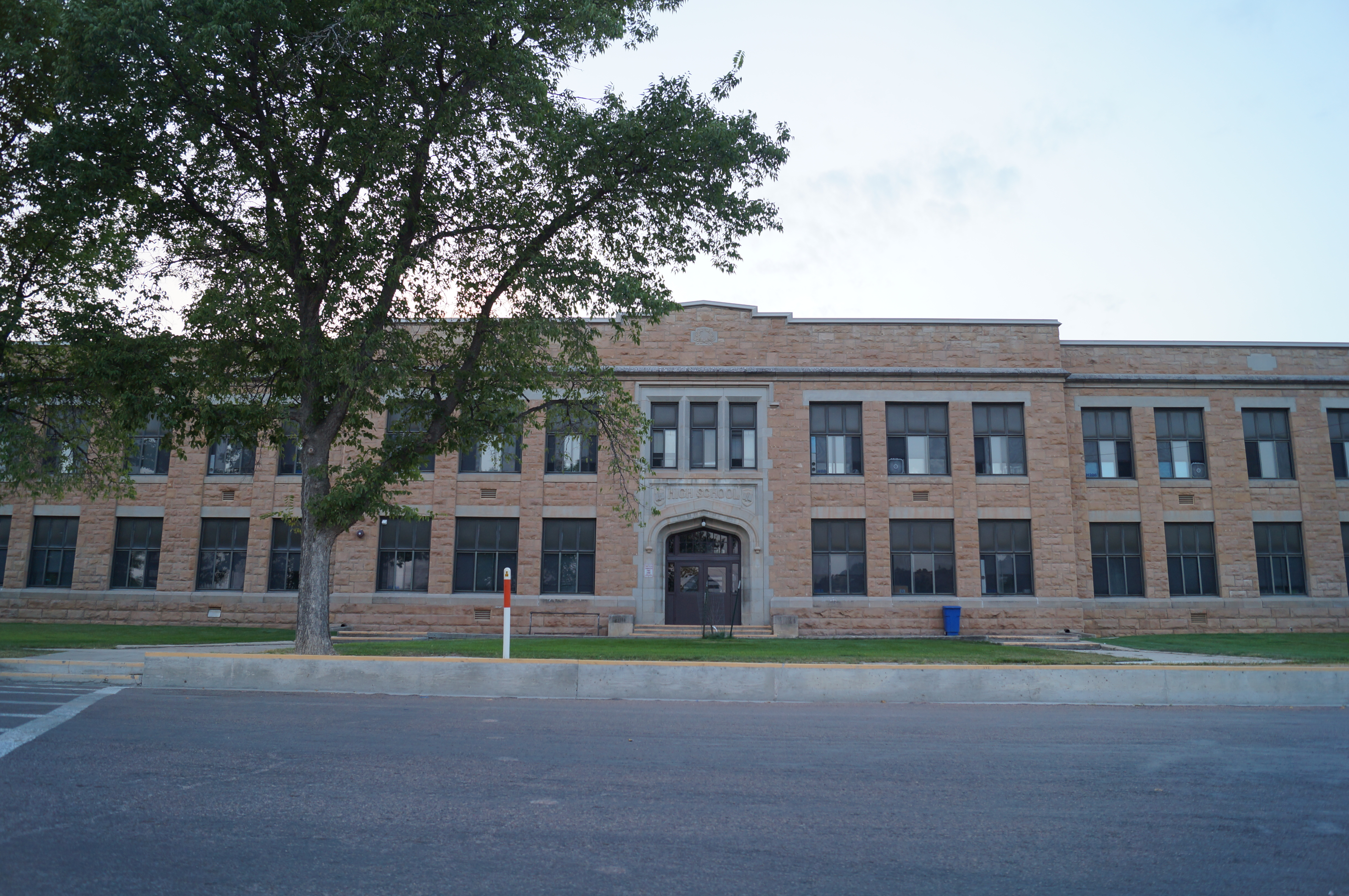

Location
- 146 North 16th Street; Hot Springs, (Fall River County), South Dakota 57747; United States

Information
- Type: Public high school
- Principal: Kain Klinkhammer
- Staff: 18.12 (FTE)
- Enrollment: 228 (2023-2024)
- Student to teacher ratio: 12.58
- Colors: Royal blue and white
- Nickname: Bison

- Hot Springs High School
- U.S. National Register of Historic Places
- Location within South Dakota Location within the United States
- Location: 146 N. 16th St., Hot Springs, South Dakota
- Coordinates: 43°25′50″N 103°28′51″W
- Area: 2 acres (0.81 ha)
- Built: 1925, 1953, 1959
- Architectural style: Tudor Revival
- NRHP reference No.: 80003721
- Added to NRHP: May 7, 1980

The Hot Springs High School, in Hot Springs, South Dakota is a public high school serving Hot Springs and the local area, in Fall River County. It is part of the Hot Springs School District. The school mascot is the Bisons.

== History ==
The first high school was built in 1894. The school moved to a converted building of the former Black Hills College, using that from 1910 to 1924 when the building was destroyed in a fire.

== 1925 building ==
The school's current building was built in 1925, with additions in 1953 and 1959. It was listed on the National Register of Historic Places in 1980.

It is Tudor Revival in style, and is built of reddish-tan sandstone cut into rough ashlar, with bands using lighter tones of sandstone. The entrance has a compound Tudor arch.
