= Banjo Dan and the Mid-nite Plowboys =

- Origin: United States
- Genre: Bluegrass
- Years active: 1972–2012
- Members: Dan Lindner - banjo, vocals Willy Lindner - mandolin, vocals Alan Davis - guitar, vocals Jon Henry Drake - bass, vocals Phil Bloch - fiddle
- Past members: Pete Tourin; Sam Blagden; David Gusakov
- Website: Banjodan.com

Banjo Dan and the Mid-nite Plowboys was an American bluegrass band. It was formed in 1972 and disbanded in 2012.

== History ==
Banjo Dan and the Mid-nite Plowboys was formed in 1972 in Vermont. Dan and Willy Lindner, Al Davis, and Peter Tourin began playing bluegrass music in Vermont’s Green Mountains. The band and band members have released over seventeen albums.

Banjo Dan and the Mid-nite Plowboys were Vermont Public Broadcasting System's Guest of the House in 1983. The band played their final public concert at the Barre (Vermont) Opera House on September 29, 2012. Founding members “Banjo Dan” Linder, mandolinist Will Lindner and guitarist Al Davis were joined by bass player Jon Henry Drake and fiddler Phil Bloch.

Dan and Willy Lindner currently perform primarily as 'The Sky Blue Boys' duo.

== Discography ==
- Fire in the Sugarhouse - 2008
- Mystery and Memories: Banjo Dan's Songs of Vermont Volume 3 - 2006
- Like a River: A Bluegrass Journey - 2002
- Some Rust...Runs Good - 2000
- The Catamount is Back: Banjo Dan's Songs of Vermont Vol. II - 1994
- Banjo Dan and the Mid-Nite Plowboys - 1990
- I'll Take the Hills: Banjo Dan's Songs of Vermont - 1987
- Green Mountain Skyline - 1986
- Sleepin' Under the Bridge - 1983
- The Lindner Brothers: With Friends Like These - 1981
- High Time - 1977
- Snowfall - 1974
