= Provo, South Dakota =

Unincorporated community in South Dakota, U.S.

Coordinates: 43°11′37″N 103°49′59″W

Provo is an unincorporated community and census-designated place in Fall River County, South Dakota, United States. The population was 10 at the 2020 census.

== History ==
A post office called Provo was established in 1904. The community's name is derived from Bill Provost Sr., an early resident.

== Education ==
The school district is Edgemont School District 23-1.
