= Oelrichs, South Dakota =

Oelrichs, South Dakota Šuŋkpȟáwaksa
- Town
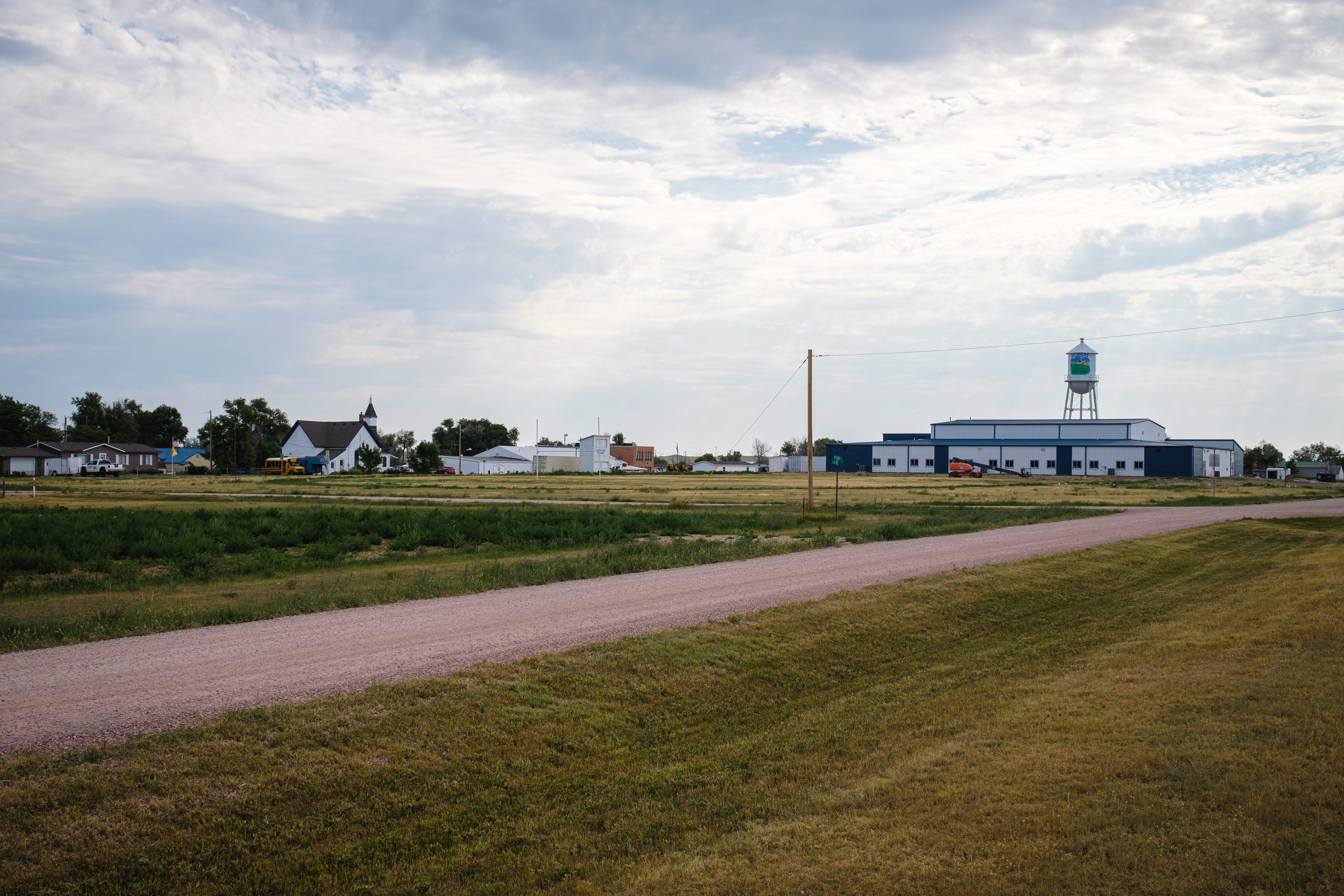

- Location in Fall River County and the state of South Dakota
- Coordinates: 43°10′55″N 103°14′00″W
- Country: United States
- State: South Dakota
- County: Fall River
- Incorporated: 1910

Area
  - Total: 0.37 sq mi (0.95 km^{2})
  - Land: 0.37 sq mi (0.95 km^{2})
  - Water: 0 sq mi (0.00 km^{2})
- Elevation: 3,363 ft (1,025 m)

Population (2020)
  - Total: 117
  - Density: 320.2/sq mi (123.62/km^{2})
- Time zone: UTC-7 (Mountain (MST))
  - Summer (DST): UTC-6 (MDT)
- ZIP codes: 57763, 57782
- Area code: 605
- FIPS code: 46-46500
- GNIS feature ID: 1267520

Oelrichs (Lakota: Šuŋkpȟáwaksa; "Severed Horse Head") is a town in Fall River County, South Dakota, United States. The population was 117 at the 2020 census.

== History ==
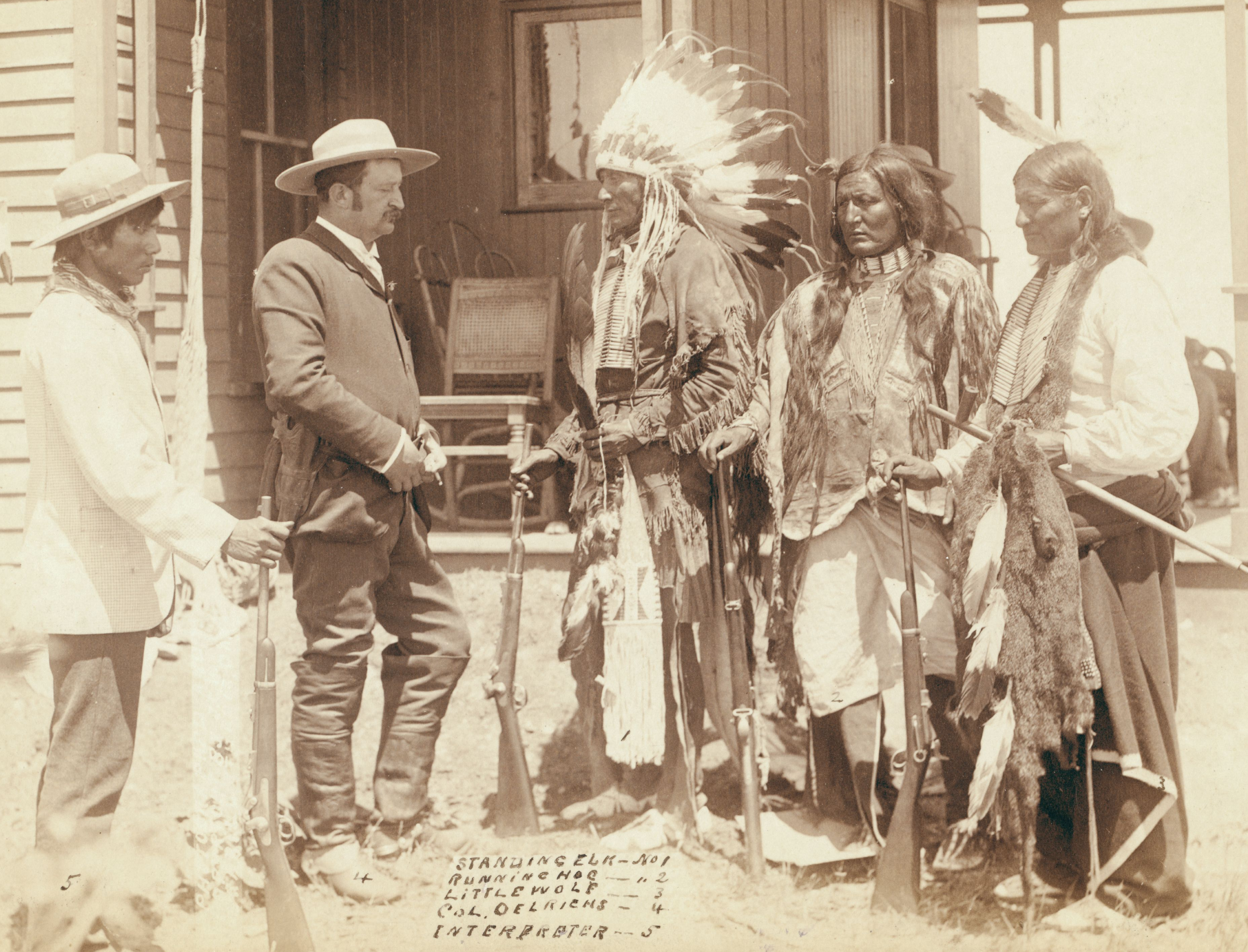
Harry Oelrichs (second from left) speaking with tribal leaders in 1887

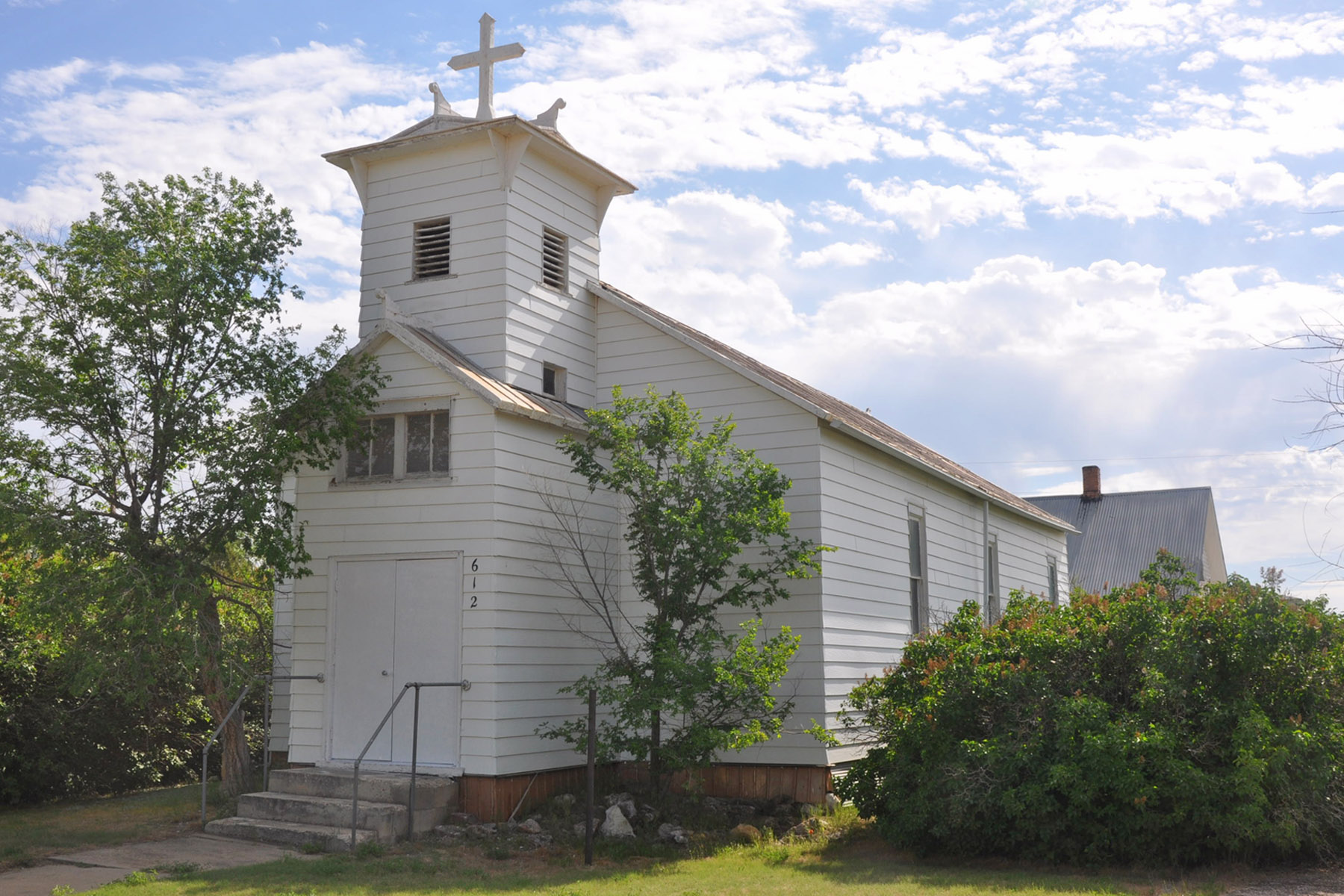
St. Martin's Catholic Church

Oelrichs was laid out in 1885. The town was founded by Henry (Harry) Oelrichs, superintendent of the Anglo-American Cattle Company. A post office called Oelrichs has been in operation since 1885.

== Geography ==
According to the United States Census Bureau, the town has a total area of 0.38 square miles (0.98 km^{2}), all land.

=== Climate ===
Climate data for Oelrichs, South Dakota (1991–2020 normals, extremes 1893–present)
Month	Jan	Feb	Mar	Apr	May	Jun	Jul	Aug	Sep	Oct	Nov	Dec	Year
Record high °F (°C)	69 (21)	78 (26)	85 (29)	98 (37)	103 (39)	110 (43)	114 (46)	110 (43)	109 (43)	96 (36)	87 (31)	74 (23)	114 (46)
Mean maximum °F (°C)	56.4 (13.6)	61.0 (16.1)	75.5 (24.2)	81.8 (27.7)	89.2 (31.8)	96.5 (35.8)	102.7 (39.3)	101.6 (38.7)	97.4 (36.3)	86.3 (30.2)	71.6 (22.0)	58.6 (14.8)	103.9 (39.9)
Mean daily maximum °F (°C)	35.8 (2.1)	39.7 (4.3)	50.9 (10.5)	59.5 (15.3)	68.9 (20.5)	79.9 (26.6)	88.9 (31.6)	88.2 (31.2)	78.9 (26.1)	63.0 (17.2)	48.4 (9.1)	37.0 (2.8)	61.6 (16.4)
Daily mean °F (°C)	24.3 (−4.3)	27.1 (−2.7)	36.8 (2.7)	45.1 (7.3)	55.2 (12.9)	65.6 (18.7)	73.5 (23.1)	72.0 (22.2)	62.5 (16.9)	48.0 (8.9)	35.2 (1.8)	25.4 (−3.7)	47.6 (8.7)
Mean daily minimum °F (°C)	12.9 (−10.6)	14.4 (−9.8)	22.7 (−5.2)	30.7 (−0.7)	41.4 (5.2)	51.4 (10.8)	58.0 (14.4)	55.9 (13.3)	46.1 (7.8)	33.1 (0.6)	22.0 (−5.6)	13.8 (−10.1)	33.5 (0.8)
Mean minimum °F (°C)	−10.6 (−23.7)	−8.2 (−22.3)	1.6 (−16.9)	14.3 (−9.8)	25.3 (−3.7)	39.0 (3.9)	46.7 (8.2)	44.4 (6.9)	32.0 (0.0)	14.6 (−9.7)	1.9 (−16.7)	−8.5 (−22.5)	−19.1 (−28.4)
Record low °F (°C)	−36 (−38)	−41 (−41)	−24 (−31)	−7 (−22)	14 (−10)	27 (−3)	34 (1)	26 (−3)	9 (−13)	−11 (−24)	−22 (−30)	−37 (−38)	−41 (−41)
Average precipitation inches (mm)	0.41 (10)	0.50 (13)	1.02 (26)	2.04 (52)	3.25 (83)	3.35 (85)	2.00 (51)	1.54 (39)	1.40 (36)	1.35 (34)	0.58 (15)	0.41 (10)	17.85 (453)
Average snowfall inches (cm)	6.2 (16)	7.3 (19)	7.1 (18)	5.3 (13)	0.3 (0.76)	0.0 (0.0)	0.0 (0.0)	0.0 (0.0)	0.2 (0.51)	3.6 (9.1)	5.5 (14)	8.3 (21)	43.8 (111)
Average precipitation days (≥ 0.01 in)	3.4	4.1	5.4	7.9	10.2	9.4	6.9	5.9	5.5	5.9	4.0	3.8	72.4
Average snowy days (≥ 0.1 in)	2.8	3.6	3.0	1.9	0.2	0.0	0.0	0.0	0.1	1.0	2.2	3.6	18.4
Source: NOAA

== Demographics ==
Historical population
Census	Pop.	Note	%±
1890	303		—
1910	150		—
1920	176		17.3%
1930	206		17.0%
1940	212		2.9%
1950	168		−20.8%
1960	132		−21.4%
1970	94		−28.8%
1980	124		31.9%
1990	138		11.3%
2000	145		5.1%
2010	126		−13.1%
2020	117		−7.1%
U.S. Decennial Census

=== 2010 census ===
As of the census of 2010, there were 126 people, 61 households, and 38 families residing in the town. The population density was 331.6 inhabitants per square mile (128.0/km^{2}). There were 74 housing units at an average density of 194.7 per square mile (75.2/km^{2}). The racial makeup of the town was 79.4% White, 18.3% Native American, and 2.4% from two or more races.

There were 61 households, of which 19.7% had children under the age of 18 living with them, 41.0% were married couples living together, 19.7% had a female householder with no husband present, 1.6% had a male householder with no wife present, and 37.7% were non-families. 34.4% of all households were made up of individuals, and 19.7% had someone living alone who was 65 years of age or older. The average household size was 2.07 and the average family size was 2.61.

The median age in the town was 53 years. 18.3% of residents were under the age of 18; 2.4% were between the ages of 18 and 24; 22.2% were from 25 to 44; 34.1% were from 45 to 64; and 23% were 65 years of age or older. The gender makeup of the town was 47.6% male and 52.4% female.

=== 2000 census ===
As of the census of 2000, there were 145 people, 67 households, and 45 families residing in the town. The population density was 384.0 inhabitants per square mile (148.3/km^{2}). There were 76 housing units at an average density of 201.3 per square mile (77.7/km^{2}). The racial makeup of the town was 83.45% White, 15.86% Native American, and 0.69% from two or more races.

There were 67 households, out of which 16.4% had children under the age of 18 living with them, 50.7% were married couples living together, 11.9% had a female householder with no husband present, and 32.8% were non-families. 25.4% of all households were made up of individuals, and 17.9% had someone living alone who was 65 years of age or older. The average household size was 2.16 and the average family size was 2.47.

In the town, the population was spread out, with 16.6% under the age of 18, 4.1% from 18 to 24, 15.9% from 25 to 44, 29.7% from 45 to 64, and 33.8% who were 65 years of age or older. The median age was 51 years. For every 100 females, there were 90.8 males. For every 100 females age 18 and over, there were 92.1 males.

The median income for a household in the town was $27,222, and the median income for a family was $28,906. Males had a median income of $19,583 versus $19,167 for females. The per capita income for the town was $13,454. There were 5.1% of families and 12.7% of the population living below the poverty line, including 36.0% of under eighteens and 2.0% of those over 64.
