= Edgemont, South Dakota =

Edgemont
- City
- Edgemont, South Dakota
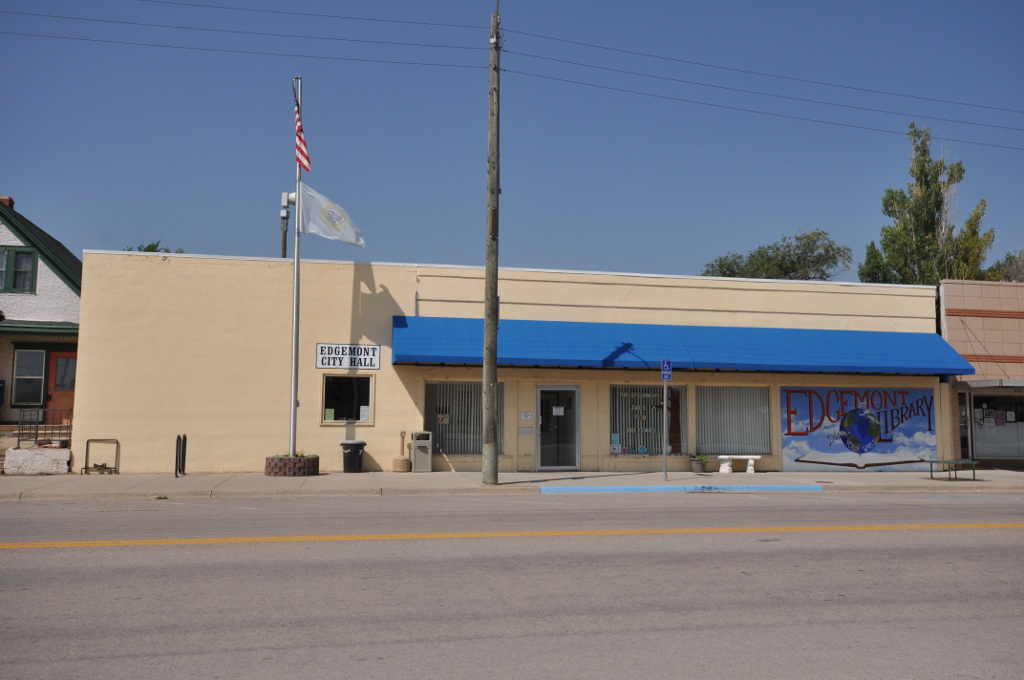
- Edgemont City Hall, August 2017
- Motto: "To The Black Hills"
- Location in Fall River County and the state of South Dakota
- Coordinates: 43°17′51″N 103°49′56″W
- Country: United States
- State: South Dakota
- County: Fall River
- Incorporated: 1895

Area
  - Total: 1.38 sq mi (3.58 km^{2})
  - Land: 1.38 sq mi (3.58 km^{2})
  - Water: 0 sq mi (0.00 km^{2})
- Elevation: 3,517 ft (1,072 m)

Population (2020)
  - Total: 725
  - Density: 524.5/sq mi (202.51/km^{2})
- Time zone: UTC-7 (Mountain (MST))
  - Summer (DST): UTC-6 (MDT)
- ZIP code: 57735
- Area code: 605
- FIPS code: 46-18300
- GNIS feature ID: 1267376
- Website: City of Edgemont

Edgemont is a city in Fall River County, South Dakota, United States. The population was 725 at the 2020 census. The city lies on the far southern edge of the Black Hills in southwestern South Dakota.

Edgemont is a crew change point for BNSF freight trains in the Gillette, Wyoming-Alliance, Nebraska division. Nearly 50 pool crews were operating out of the town in early 2023.

== History ==
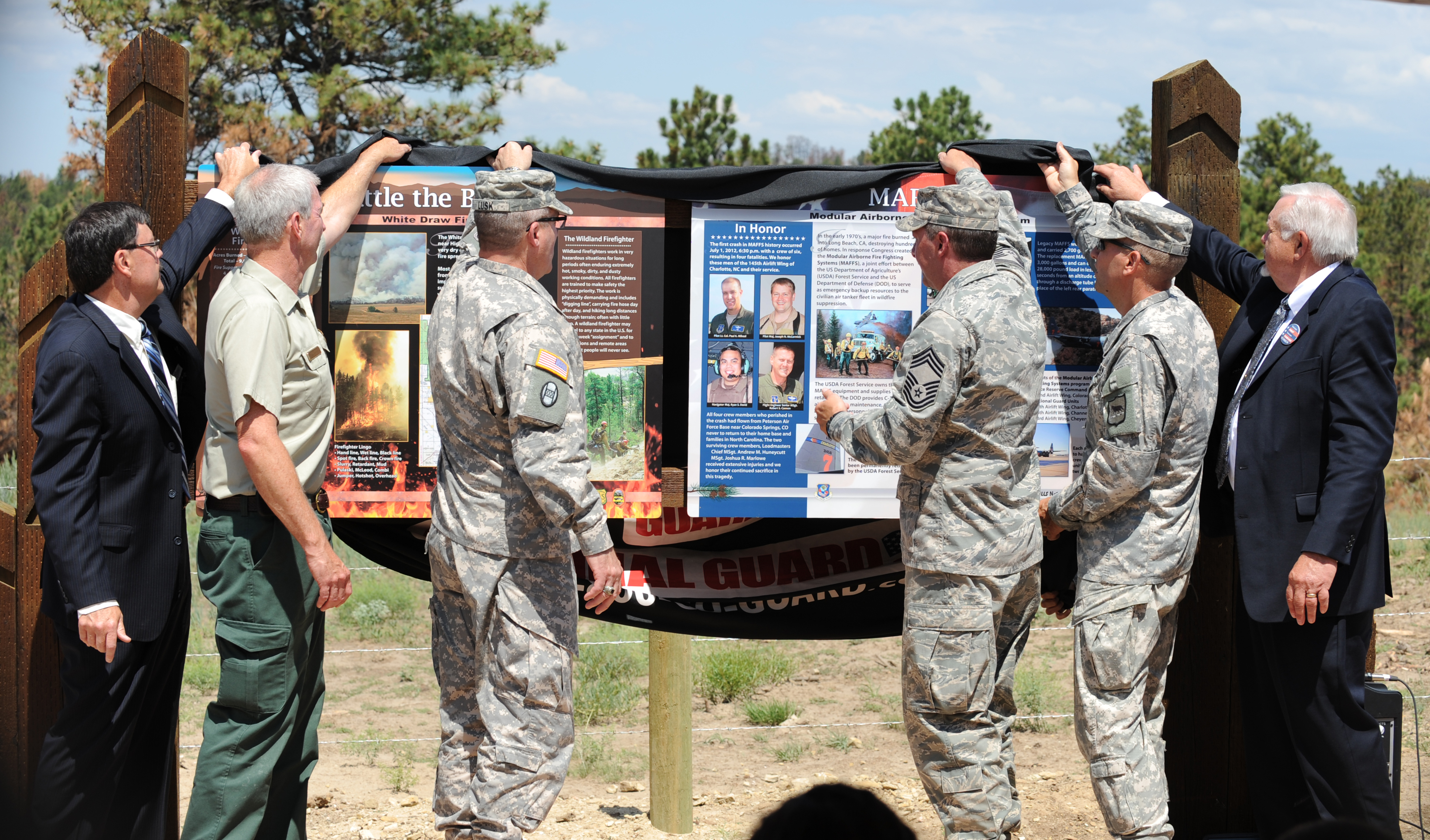
Honoring the airmen of the North Carolina Air National Guard C-130 aircraft that crashed on July 1, 2012, while fighting the White Draw Fire

Edgemont had its start in 1890 with the building of the Burlington Railroad through that territory.

In 2012, the White Draw Fire burned eight miles northeast of Edgemont. On July 1, 2012, a Lockheed C-130 Hercules from the North Carolina Air National Guard fighting the fire crashed 7.44 mi Northeast of Edgemont on a Steep Ridge, killing four military personnel and injuring two.

On the morning of January 17, 2017, a BNSF Railway westbound train struck and killed two roadway workers, including the watchman/lookout. The accident occurred at milepost 477, on the Black Hills subdivision, in Edgemont.

On April 25, 1903, President Theodore Roosevelt visited Edgemont during a western tour. A photograph, titled Rough Riding by the Black Hill Pioneers--cheering President Roosevelt--Edgemont, S.D., captured the event, showing him being greeted by the "Rough Riders". The Library of Congress also holds a photo from this visit, titled Cheering President Roosevelt - Edgemont, S.D. The image showcases Roosevelt's horseback presence and the enthusiastic reception he received. A digital copy of his speech can be viewed online at the Theodore Roosevelt Center.

A historical marker, erected in 2005 in Edgemont City Park by the Edgemont area and Minnehaha County Historical Societies, reads:

President Theodore Roosevelt (T. R.) stopped in Edgemont on April 25, 1903 as part of a western states tour. Hundreds were on hand to welcome him. An old friend, Seth Bullock of Deadwood, arrived with him. They were then taken by carriage to City Park to the bandstand draped in red, white, and blue bunting. T. R. spoke to the crowd and paid tribute to those pioneers who had tamed “the shaggy wilderness” of the Black Hills area.

Town society matrons had planned a banquet to honor the president. However, a group of cowboys pulled their chuck-wagon to the bandstand and shouted, "Come on, Teddy, eat with us!" He joined them and while eating beans and bacon from a tin plate and washing his food down with coffee from a tin cup, T. R. happily recalled his ranching days on the Little Missouri River. The cowboys brought a horse to him, and he galloped down the street while they whooped it up and fired their six-shooters into the air.

T. R returned to his train when its whistle signaled, and the disappointed city dignitaries were left to dine without him

== Geography ==
According to the United States Census Bureau, the city has a total area of 0.97 square miles (2.51 km^{2}), all land.

The city lies at the intersection of US Highway 18 and South Dakota Highway 471. Its closest neighbors are Burdock and Dewey to the northwest, Hot Springs to the northeast, and Provo and Rumford to the south.

Edgemont lies just to the south of the Elk Mountains, a small range that is part of the Black Hills.

=== Climate ===
According to the Köppen Climate Classification system, Edgemont has a cold semi-arid climate, abbreviated "BSk" on climate maps. The hottest temperature recorded there was 111 °F (43.9 °C) on June 22, 2016, and July 21, 2016, while the coldest temperature recorded was −40 °F (−40.0 °C) on December 22, 1989.

Climate data for Edgemont, South Dakota (1991–2020 normals, extremes 1979–present)
Month	Jan	Feb	Mar	Apr	May	Jun	Jul	Aug	Sep	Oct	Nov	Dec	Year
Record high °F (°C)	68 (20)	74 (23)	86 (30)	92 (33)	96 (36)	111 (44)	111 (44)	107 (42)	105 (41)	95 (35)	80 (27)	70 (21)	111 (44)
Mean maximum °F (°C)	54.1 (12.3)	59.1 (15.1)	74.4 (23.6)	82.3 (27.9)	90.1 (32.3)	97.9 (36.6)	102.4 (39.1)	100.5 (38.1)	96.9 (36.1)	85.4 (29.7)	69.8 (21.0)	56.0 (13.3)	103.5 (39.7)
Mean daily maximum °F (°C)	33.6 (0.9)	38.4 (3.6)	50.3 (10.2)	59.3 (15.2)	68.7 (20.4)	80.1 (26.7)	88.8 (31.6)	87.3 (30.7)	77.6 (25.3)	61.8 (16.6)	46.9 (8.3)	34.8 (1.6)	60.6 (15.9)
Daily mean °F (°C)	18.9 (−7.3)	23.1 (−4.9)	34.2 (1.2)	43.4 (6.3)	53.3 (11.8)	64.0 (17.8)	71.8 (22.1)	69.7 (20.9)	59.5 (15.3)	44.5 (6.9)	30.8 (−0.7)	20.1 (−6.6)	44.4 (6.9)
Mean daily minimum °F (°C)	4.3 (−15.4)	7.8 (−13.4)	18.0 (−7.8)	27.4 (−2.6)	37.9 (3.3)	47.9 (8.8)	54.8 (12.7)	52.1 (11.2)	41.5 (5.3)	27.3 (−2.6)	14.8 (−9.6)	5.4 (−14.8)	28.3 (−2.1)
Mean minimum °F (°C)	−14.9 (−26.1)	−10.6 (−23.7)	2.1 (−16.6)	15.3 (−9.3)	26.1 (−3.3)	39.1 (3.9)	48.2 (9.0)	44.2 (6.8)	30.2 (−1.0)	13.2 (−10.4)	−2.5 (−19.2)	−11.3 (−24.1)	−22.9 (−30.5)
Record low °F (°C)	−37 (−38)	−39 (−39)	−25 (−32)	−9 (−23)	18 (−8)	28 (−2)	40 (4)	32 (0)	8 (−13)	−16 (−27)	−21 (−29)	−40 (−40)	−40 (−40)
Average precipitation inches (mm)	0.37 (9.4)	0.48 (12)	0.95 (24)	1.84 (47)	2.65 (67)	2.64 (67)	2.21 (56)	1.50 (38)	1.21 (31)	1.26 (32)	0.56 (14)	0.44 (11)	16.11 (409)
Average snowfall inches (cm)	5.0 (13)	5.6 (14)	6.4 (16)	4.6 (12)	1.0 (2.5)	0.0 (0.0)	0.0 (0.0)	0.0 (0.0)	0.1 (0.25)	2.7 (6.9)	4.7 (12)	6.1 (15)	36.2 (92)
Average precipitation days (≥ 0.01 in)	4.5	5.0	6.1	8.9	11.4	10.3	7.9	7.4	6.0	6.7	4.5	4.0	82.7
Average snowy days (≥ 0.1 in)	3.4	4.0	3.1	2.2	0.3	0.0	0.0	0.0	0.1	1.0	2.7	3.4	20.2
Source: NOAA

== Education ==
Edgemont Public Schools are part of the Edgemont School District. The district has one elementary school and one high school. Students attend Edgemont High School.

== Demographics ==
Historical population
Census	Pop.	Note	%±
1900	479		—
1910	816		70.4%
1920	1,254		53.7%
1930	1,103		−12.0%
1940	1,002		−9.2%
1950	1,158		15.6%
1960	1,772		53.0%
1970	1,174		−33.7%
1980	1,468		25.0%
1990	906		−38.3%
2000	867		−4.3%
2010	774		−10.7%
2020	725		−6.3%
U.S. Decennial Census

=== 2020 census ===
As of the 2020 census, Edgemont had a population of 725. The median age was 56.0 years. 16.8% of residents were under the age of 18 and 32.4% of residents were 65 years of age or older. For every 100 females there were 101.4 males, and for every 100 females age 18 and over there were 95.8 males age 18 and over.

0.0% of residents lived in urban areas, while 100.0% lived in rural areas.

There were 349 households in Edgemont, of which 15.8% had children under the age of 18 living in them. Of all households, 39.5% were married-couple households, 23.2% were households with a male householder and no spouse or partner present, and 32.1% were households with a female householder and no spouse or partner present. About 41.0% of all households were made up of individuals and 24.1% had someone living alone who was 65 years of age or older.

There were 460 housing units, of which 24.1% were vacant. The homeowner vacancy rate was 5.6% and the rental vacancy rate was 24.7%.

Racial composition as of the 2020 census
Race	Number	Percent
White	641	88.4%
Black or African American	0	0.0%
American Indian and Alaska Native	46	6.3%
Asian	0	0.0%
Native Hawaiian and Other Pacific Islander	4	0.6%
Some other race	1	0.1%
Two or more races	33	4.6%
Hispanic or Latino (of any race)	15	2.1%

=== 2010 census ===
As of the census of 2010, there were 774 people, 386 households, and 201 families living in the city. The population density was 798 inhabitants per square mile (308.1/km^{2}). There were 509 housing units at an average density of 524.7 per square mile (202.6/km^{2}). The racial makeup of the city was 92.1% White, 0.1% African American, 3.4% Native American, 0.3% from other races, and 4.1% from two or more races. Hispanic or Latino of any race were 2.1% of the population.

There were 386 households, of which 18.9% had children under the age of 18 living with them, 41.5% were married couples living together, 7.0% had a female householder with no husband present, 3.6% had a male householder with no wife present, and 47.9% were non-families. 42.2% of all households were made up of individuals, and 21.7% had someone living alone who was 65 years of age or older. The average household size was 2.01 and the average family size was 2.71.

The median age in the city was 51.3 years. 17.8% of residents were under the age of 18; 6.1% were between the ages of 18 and 24; 17.2% were from 25 to 44; 34.1% were from 45 to 64; and 24.7% were 65 years of age or older. The gender makeup of the city was 51.3% male and 48.7% female.

=== 2000 census ===
As of the census of 2000, there were 867 people, 409 households, and 260 families living in the city. The population density was 864 inhabitants per square mile (334/km^{2}). There were 516 housing units at an average density of 514.4 per square mile (198.6/km^{2}). The racial makeup of the city was 93.19% White, 3.92% Native American, 0.46% from other races, and 2.42% from two or more races. Hispanic or Latino of any race were 1.85% of the population.

There were 409 households, out of which 21.0% had children under the age of 18 living with them, 54.3% were married couples living together, 6.1% had a female householder with no husband present, and 36.2% were non-families. 32.0% of all households were made up of individuals, and 16.9% had someone living alone who was 65 years of age or older. The average household size was 2.12 and the average family size was 2.64.

In the city, the population was spread out, with 20.0% under the age of 18, 3.6% from 18 to 24, 20.1% from 25 to 44, 31.8% from 45 to 64, and 24.6% who were 65 years of age or older. The median age was 49 years. For every 100 females, there were 103.0 males. For every 100 females age 18 and over, there were 98.3 males.

The median income for a household in the city was $24,919, and the median income for a family was $36,667. Males had a median income of $36,250 versus $16,667 for females. The per capita income for the city was $17,273. About 10.3% of families and 18.6% of the population were below the poverty line, including 20.9% of those under age 18 and 21.1% of those age 65 or over.

== See also ==
- List of cities in South Dakota
