= Pumpkin Creek =

Pumpkin Creek may refer to:

- Pumpkin Creek (Nebraska), a stream in Nebraska
- Pumpkin Creek Site, an archaeological site in Oklahoma
