= One-room school =

Small rural school in which students of different ages are mixed in a single classroom

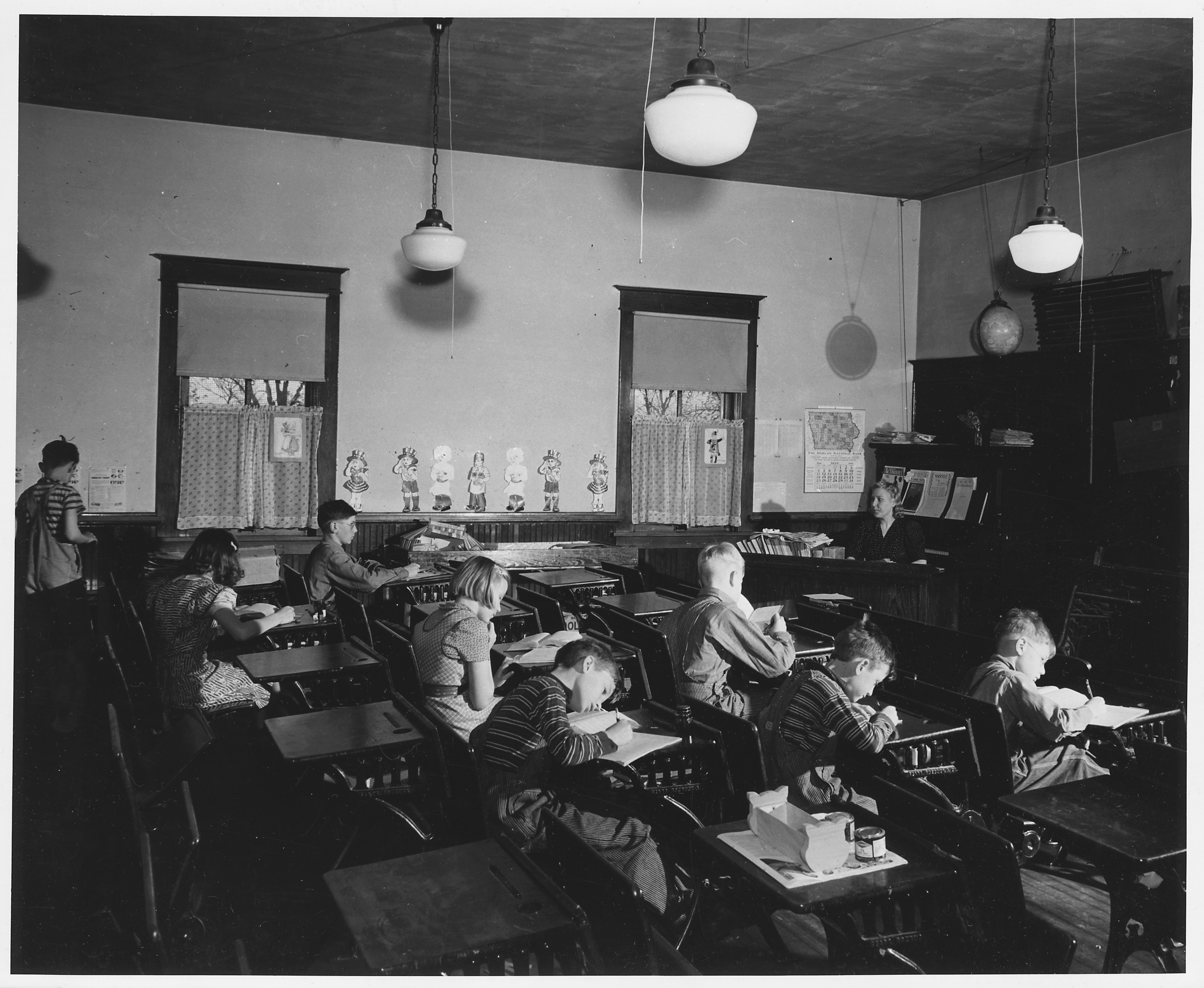
The inside of an American schoolhouse, in Shelby County, Iowa, in 1941

One-room schoolhouses, or one-room schools, have been commonplace throughout rural portions of several countries around the world. In most rural and small town schools, all of the students meet in a single room. There, a single teacher teaches academic basics to several grade levels of elementary-age children. Recent years have seen a revival of the format. One-room schoolhouses can also be found in developing nations and rural or remote areas undergoing colonization.

In the United States, the concept of a "little red schoolhouse" is a stirring one, and historic one-room schoolhouses have widely been preserved and are celebrated as symbols of frontier values and of local and national development. When necessary, the schools were enlarged or replaced with two-room schools. More than 200 are listed on the U.S. National Register of Historic Places. In Norway, by contrast, one-room schools were viewed more as impositions upon conservative farming areas, and, while a number survive in open-air museums, not a single one is listed on the Norwegian equivalent to the NRHP.

== Prussia ==
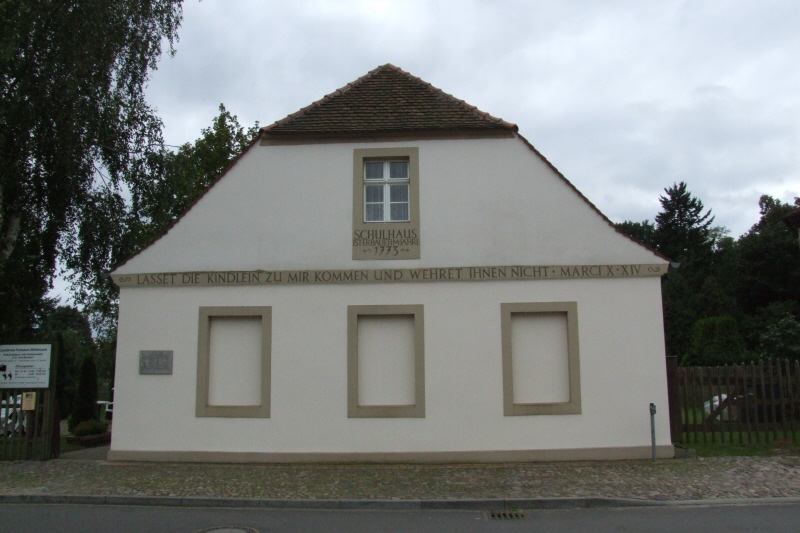
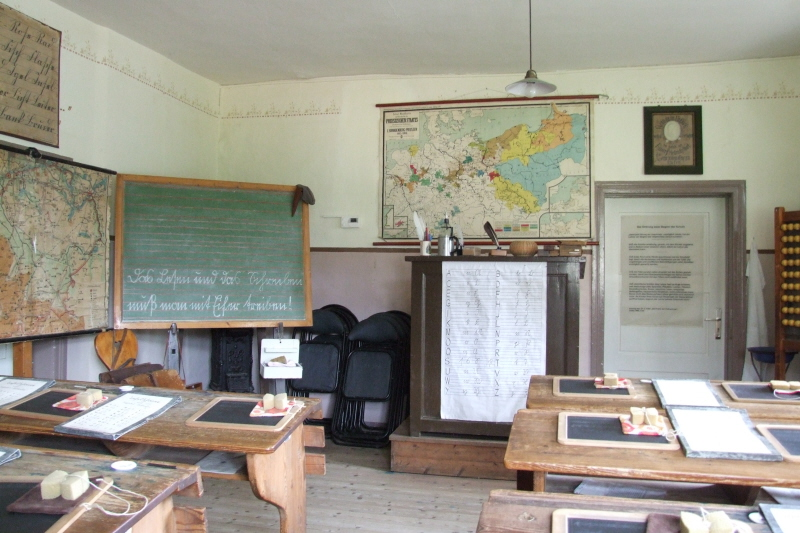
One-room school in Reckahn, Brandenburg an der Havel, founded 1773, now a museum

Prussia was among the first countries in the world to introduce a tax-funded and generally compulsory primary education for either boys and girls. In comparison, compulsory schooling in France or Great Britain was not successfully enacted until the 1880s. The state-sponsored system was introduced in the late 18th century and has had a widespread influence ever since. The first Prussian schools were simple one-room schools, but by 1773 Friedrich Eberhard von Rochow had already set up a model school with primary education in two separate age-grouped classes.

== Ireland ==
In Ireland, free primary education was mandated in 1831, prompting the establishment of many single-teacher National Schools across rural areas, most initially using a room in an existing building. By the 1890s there was a school in every parish. Most extant one- and two-room school buildings date from the decades after 1891 when primary education became compulsory. Most of those still in use today have been extended following merger with neighbouring schools. Since 2002, any state-funded school with at least 10 pupils is entitled to at least 2 teachers; the 21 schools which fell below this threshold are located on offshore islands. In recent decades, an increasing number of schools have been founded for parents not content with the National School system. These include Gaelscoileanna (which teach through Irish rather than English) and multi-denominational schools (most Irish schools are controlled by one or other of the main Christian churches). Although such schools eventually become eligible for state funding, they usually begin with a single teacher in a room or prefabricated building.

== United States ==
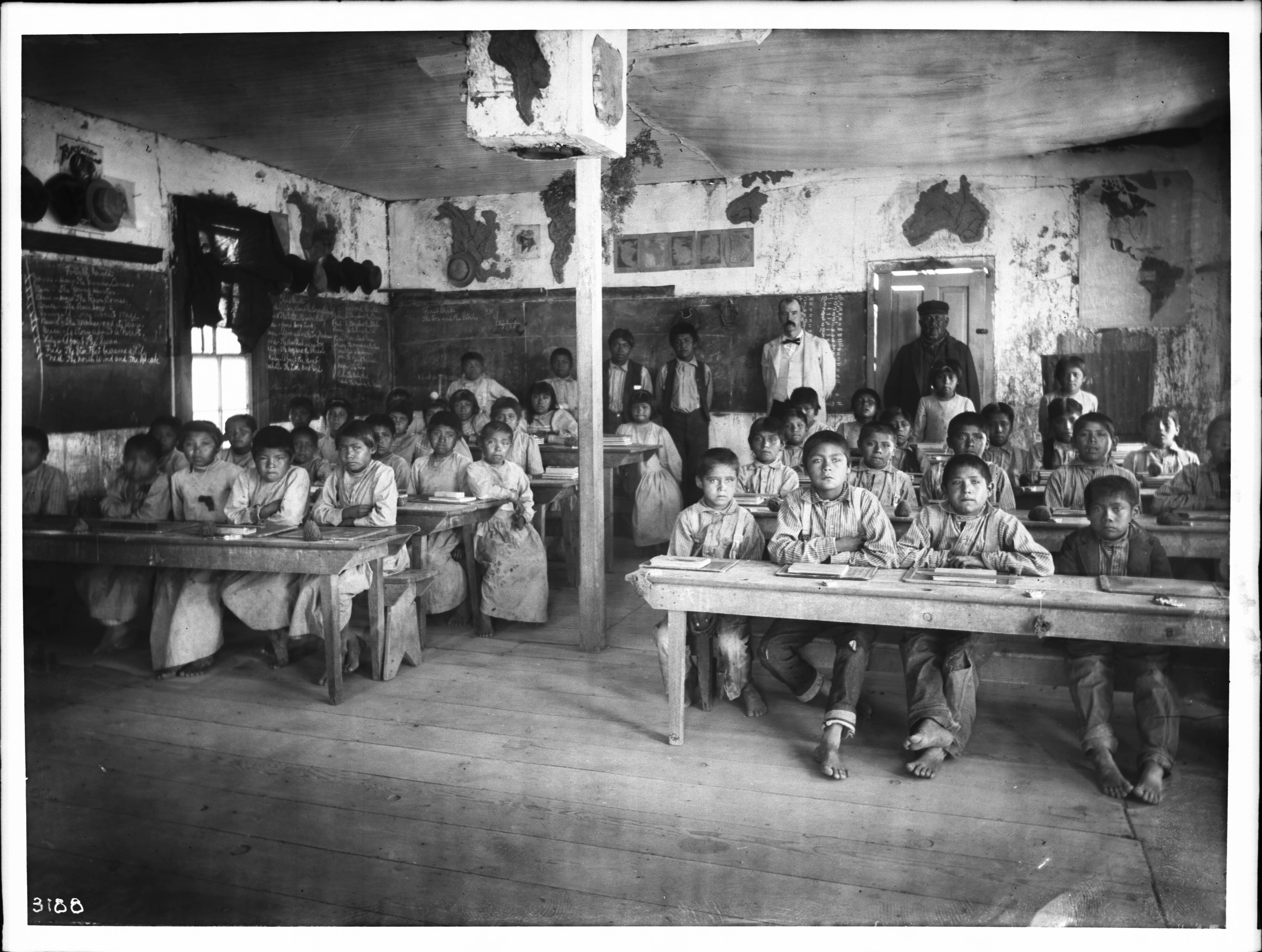
Walapai Indian school, Kingman, Arizona, c. 1900

One-room schools were used only in rural areas. As late as 1930 half of the nation's school children lived in rural areas. About 65% of the nation's school buildings were one-room, and they were attended by 30% of the rural students. Consolidation rapidly reduced their numbers in the 1920s and 1930s. They had a place in popular folklore, with one fondly recalling a, "little house, on a little ground, with a little equipment, where a little teacher at a little salary, for a little while, teaches little children little things". A less romantic view by sociologist Newell Sims reported on the majority of rural schools of all sizes in the 1930s:

The utter inadequacy of the majority is the striking feature of rural school buildings. They are poorly situated, often without any grounds, or, with grounds that are grassless, treeless and beautyless. As structures they are poorly planned, poorly lighted, poorly heated, poorly seated, poorly equipped or virtually unequipped either for comfort or education, and poorly kept. Drinking water is not usually supplied. Sanitary arrangements and toilet facilities are as likely to be entirely lacking as to be provided in even a half-way decent manner.

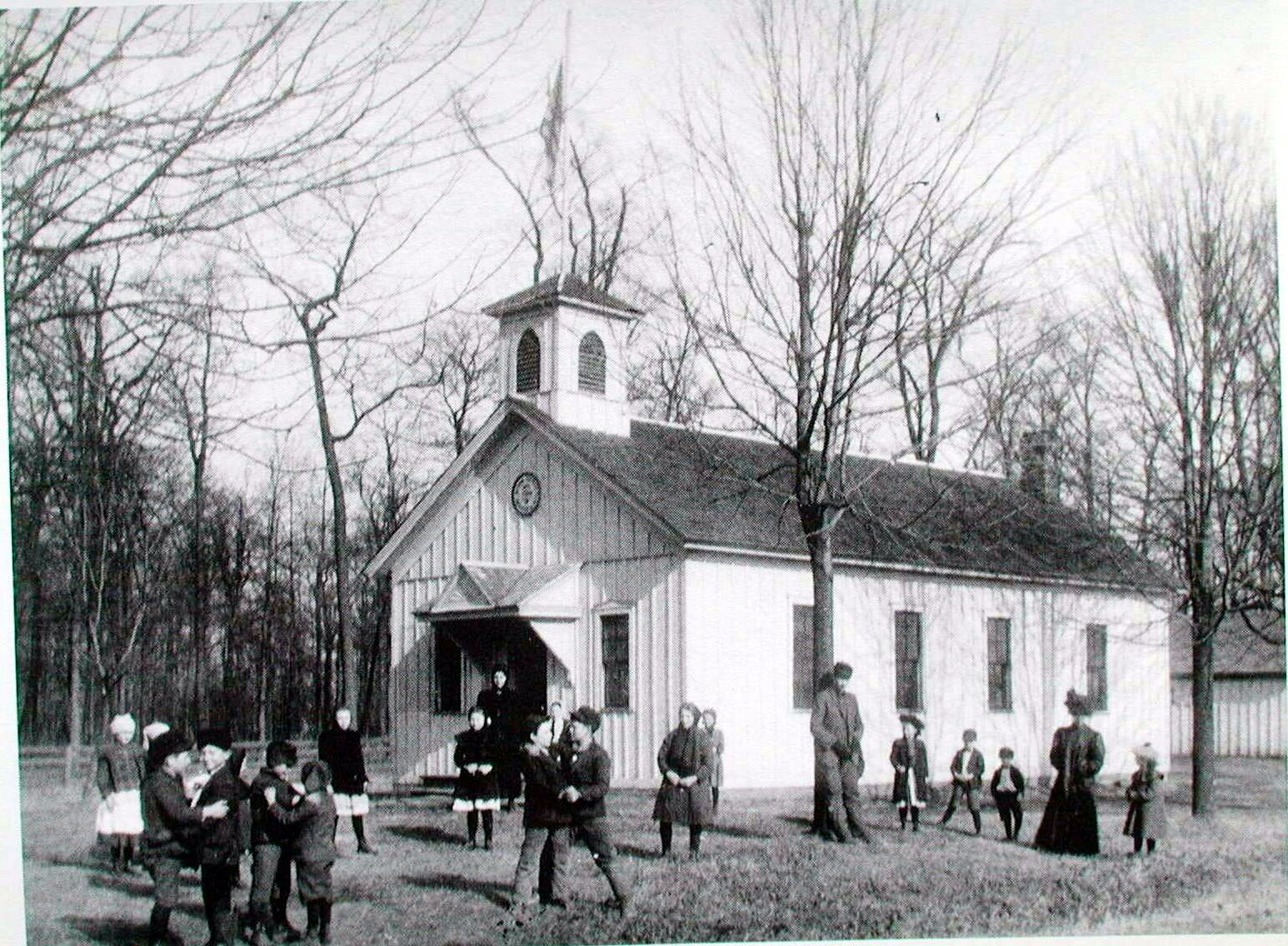
Bunert School, Warren, Michigan, c. 1876

Teachers in one-room schools were usually daughters of nearby farmers. They were recent graduates and spent a couple of years teaching before they quit to get married. The teachers were poorly prepared and needed to coach children of all ages/grades within one room. Their main role is well-described by a student from Kentucky in the 1940s:

The teachers that taught in the one room, rural schools were very special people. During the winter months they would get to the school early to get a fire started in the potbelly stove, so the building would be warm for the students. On many occasions they would prepare a hot, noon meal on top of the stove, usually consisting of soup or stew of some kind. They took care of their students like a new mother hen would care for her newly hatched chicks; always looking out for their health and welfare.

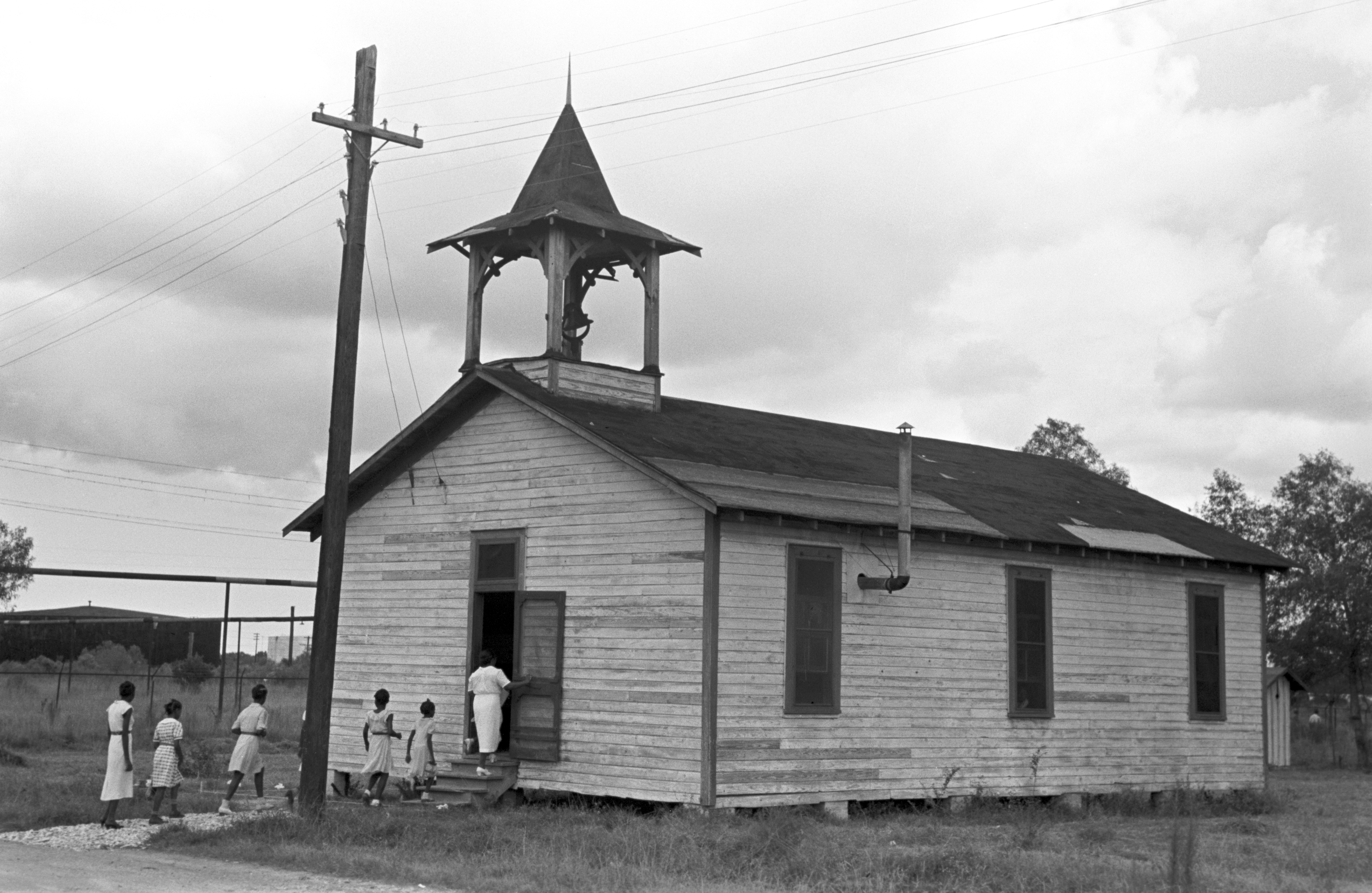
Destrehan Negro School, Destrehan, Louisiana, 1938

A typical school day was 9 a.m. to 4 p.m., with morning and afternoon recesses of 15 minutes each and an hour period for lunch. "The older students were given the responsibility of bringing in water, carrying in coal or wood for the stove. The younger students would be given responsibilities according to their size and gender such as cleaning the black board (chalkboard), taking the erasers outside for dusting plus other duties that they were capable of doing."

Transportation for children who lived too far to walk was often provided by horse-drawn kid hack or sulky, which could only travel a limited distance in a reasonable amount of time each morning and evening, or students might ride a horse, these being put out to pasture in an adjoining paddock during the day. In more recent times, students rode bicycles.

Southern students and teachers most often walked to and from school; a three-mile journey was not uncommon. Due to the poor quality of roads, automobiles were not frequently used.

The vast majority of one-room schools have been torn down; a few were converted for other purposes. However, in a handful of rural communities, such as Mennonites and Amish, one-room or two-room schools survived longer. As of 2005, almost 400 one-room schools still operated in the United States.

=== Teacher's residence ===
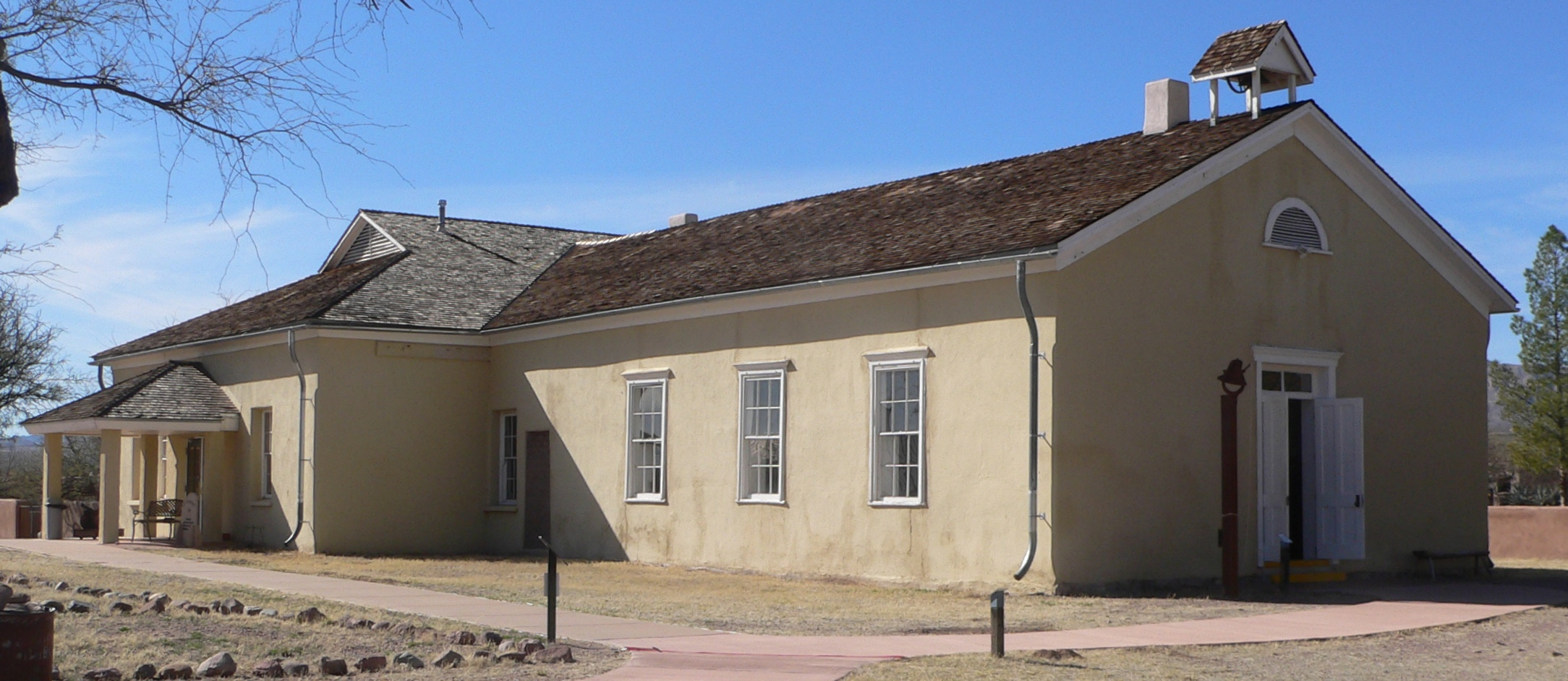
The one-room adobe schoolhouse in Tubac, Arizona, with a teacherage attached to the back

The teacher's residence, or teacherage, was often attached to the school, or very close by, so that a male teacher's wife and family were an integral part of the management and support system for the school. Single, female teachers were more often billeted or boarded with a local family to provide for social norms requiring social supervision of single females.

=== Consolidation ===
Motorized school buses in the 1920s made longer distances possible, and one-room schools were soon consolidated in most portions of the United States into multiple classroom schools where classes could be held separately for various grade levels. Gradually, one-room school houses were replaced. Most one-room schools had been replaced by larger schools by World War II except in the most rural areas. However, they are still found in remote parts of Alaska where villages have a small population.

=== Texas 1924 study ===
In the early 20th century, Texas educators and rural communities held opposing views on the purpose of schooling. The education profession emphasized efficiency, academic rigor, and preparation for the industrial economy, with some allowance for agricultural vocational programs, though few farm children attended high school. Rural citizens, by contrast, valued schools primarily as institutions of community stability, identity, and moral formation, and their demographic majority gave them political power to resist consolidation.

In 1924, reform-minded educators obtained a state grant to commission a study by nationally prominent experts, comparing school districts ranging from modern urban systems to traditional one- to four-room rural schools. The study's findings on facilities, supplies, teacher training, and length of school year confirmed expectations: rural schools lagged significantly behind. However, when researchers examined student performance in reading, spelling, arithmetic, and geography, the results were more complex. Urban students scored higher in grade 3 across all subjects, an advantage attributed in part to greater familiarity with the kinds of knowledge tested. But between grades 3 and 7, rural students matched or exceeded urban students in score gains, even with fewer days in session. Statistical analysis indicated that one-room schools were slightly superior in terms of the rate at which students learned. The final report concluded that "conclusions commonly reached regarding the ineffectiveness of the small school ... are unwarranted." The report was never published. Its findings were suppressed, and the underlying data remained inaccessible until a historian rediscovered the files six decades later. Regardless, the forces of urbanization, the New Deal, and World War II ultimately led to the consolidation of small rural school systems across Texas.

=== Preservation: buildings and cultural ===
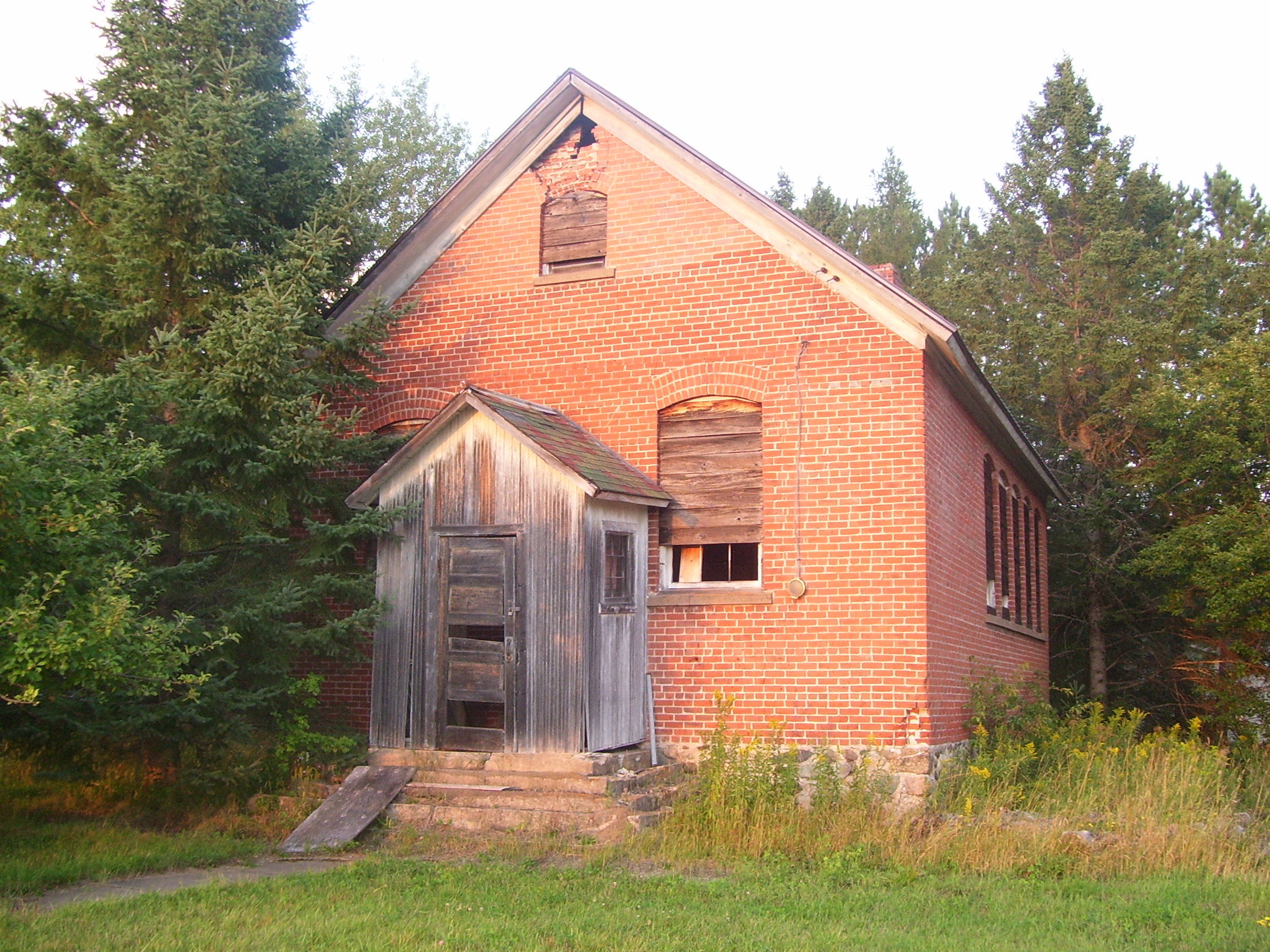
Some of the historical one-room schools that survive today remain unrestored and in disrepair.

In Calvert County, Maryland, Port Republic School Number 7 closed its doors in 1932 and sat unused for over 40 years. Then, in 1976 the Calvert Retired Teachers Association, looking for a Bicentennial Year project, decided to restore the one-room schoolhouse. On July 24, 1977, after months of hard work by teachers and community volunteers, the old school bell rang out once more, and the little one-room school house, filled with its memories and memorabilia, was ready for visitors. It is now one of the county's tourist attractions. A similar project was done in Queen Anne's County, Maryland, by retired Teachers and Community Volunteers. The restored schoolhouse is located in front of Queen Anne's County High School. In Iowa, over 125 small one-room school houses have been turned into local museums. The buildings in some places found new purpose as homes.

In Harrisburg, Nebraska, Flowerfield School serves as a living museum, and fourth-graders within the Nebraska panhandle spend a day at Flowerfield going through an average school day in 1888. The students have the opportunity to experience both log and sod versions of the house, writing with quill pens, and a trip to the nearby museum, where they learn about other aspects of life in 1888.

In Vandalia, Indiana, the Vandalia District No. 2 one-room schoolhouse served Owen County's Lafayette Township students in grades 1–8 from the time it was completed in 1868 until it closed in 1951. The building, restored by a group of volunteers in 1976, is presently maintained and preserved by the Vandalia Community Preservation Association.

The One Room School House Project of Southwestern College in Winfield, Kansas, includes listings and information on some 880 schools throughout the state and nation. The information, pictures, and stories included in this site have been collected and sent to the project by researchers and historians from across America.

The Gomer School in Fairfield, California, was listed as surplus in 2012 by the local board of education, and was converted to a boutique.

== Gallery ==
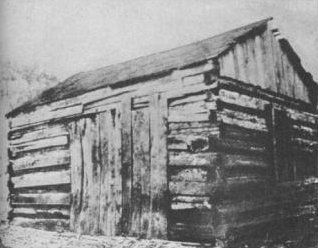
The one-room blab school attended by Abraham Lincoln in 1822

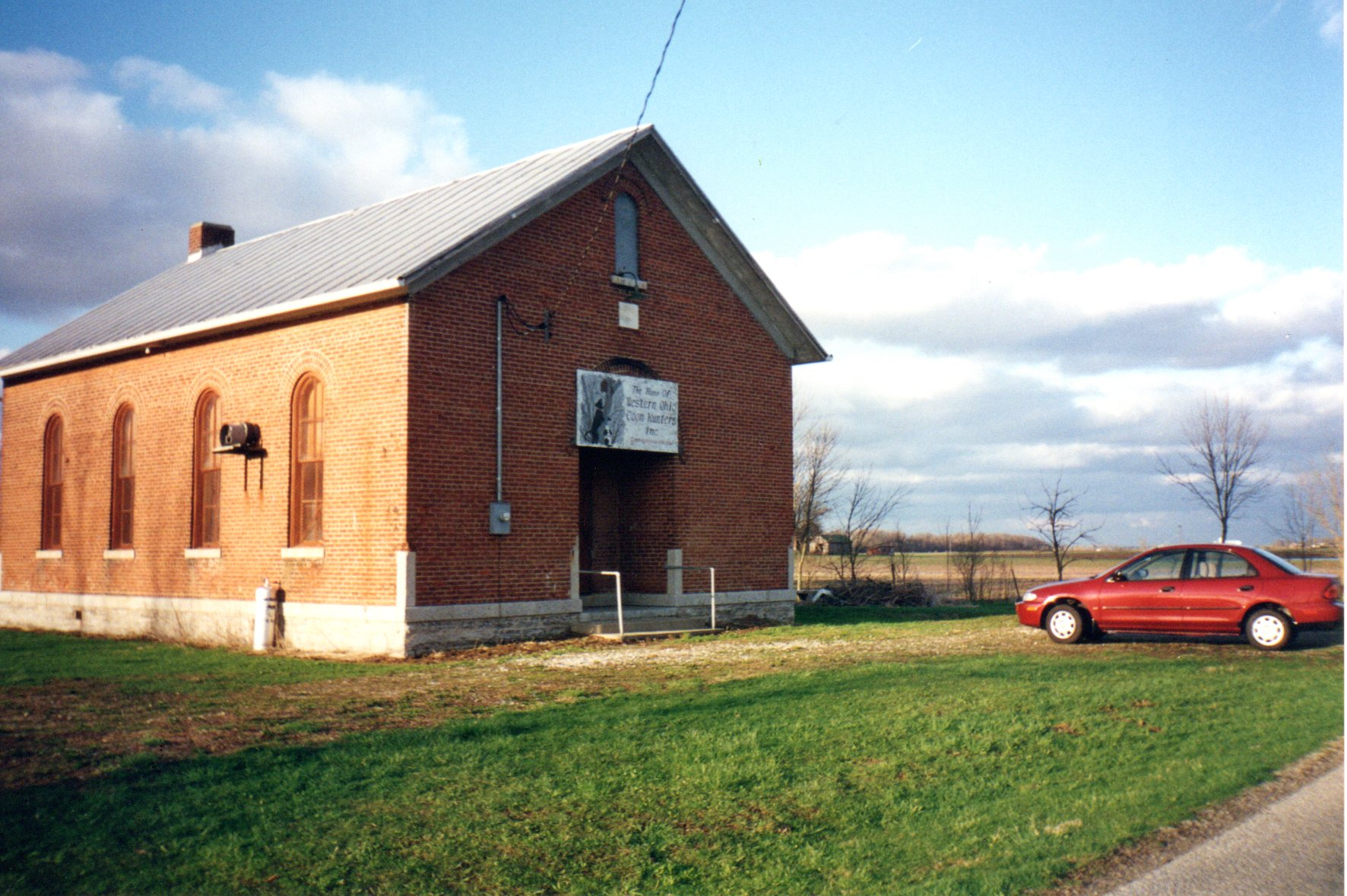
The Knick School in Darke County, Ohio, in 1996

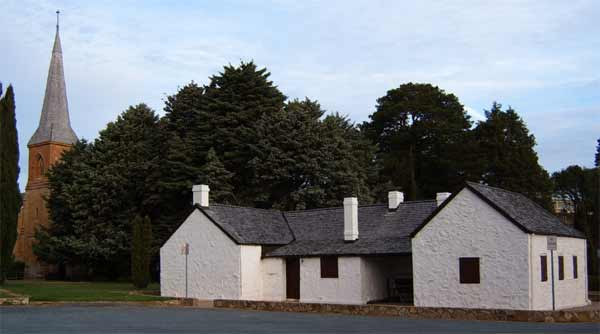
St. John the Baptist Church (1841) and a one-room schoolhouse (1845) with an attached teacherage, now a working museum in Canberra, Australia

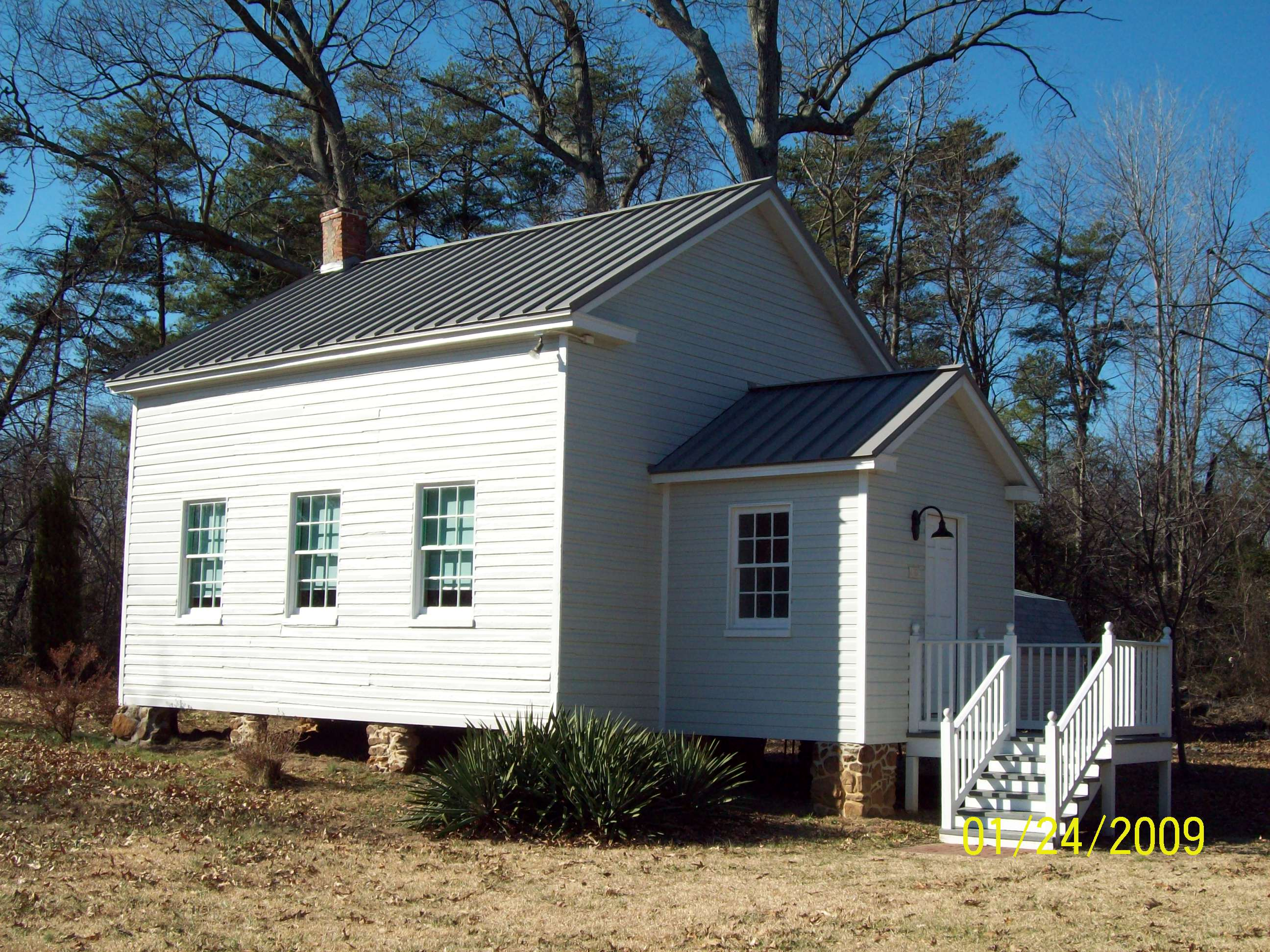
Port Republic School #7 in Calvert County, Maryland

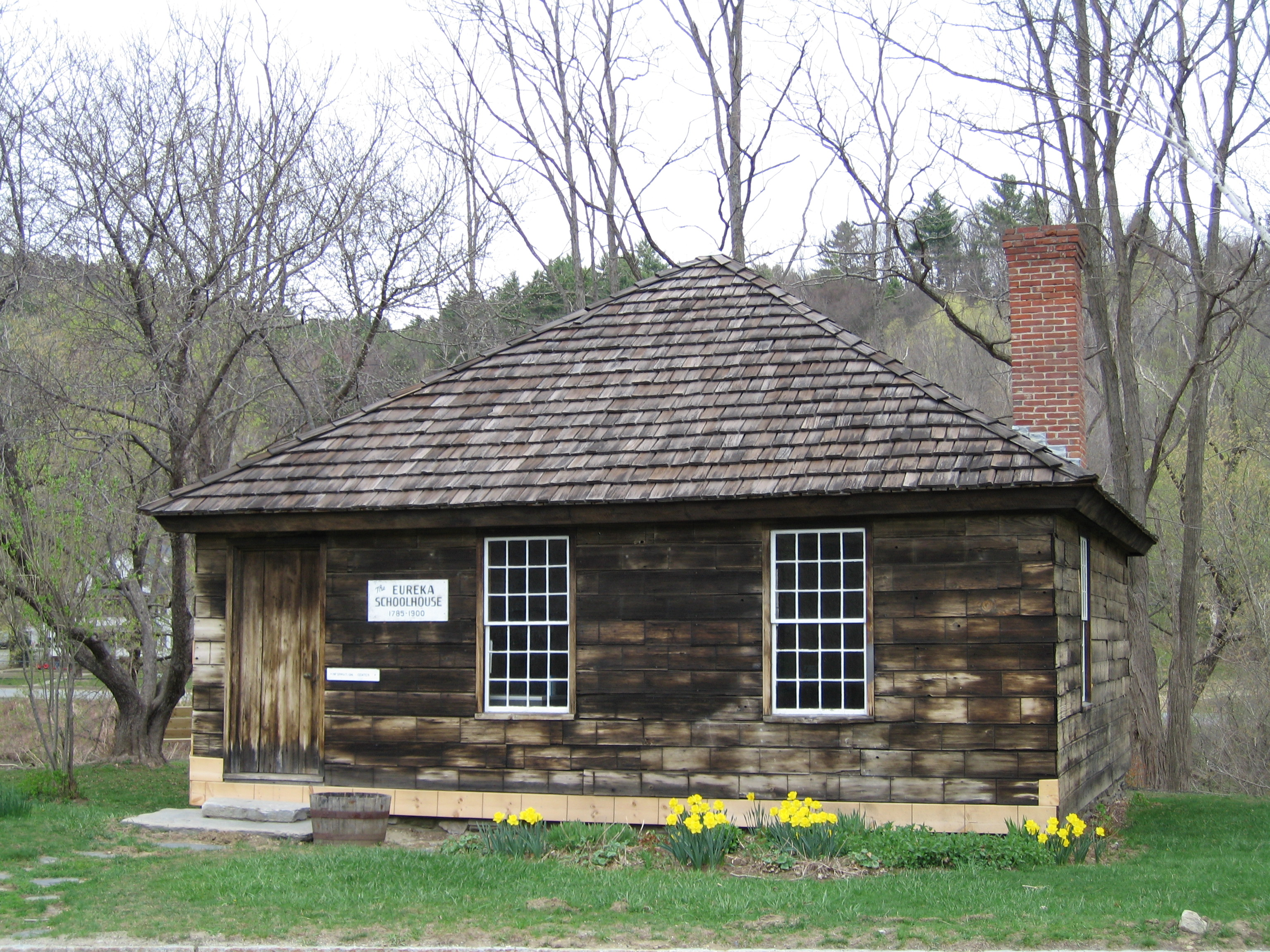
The Eureka Schoolhouse in Springfield, Vermont, was built in 1785 and closed in 1900.

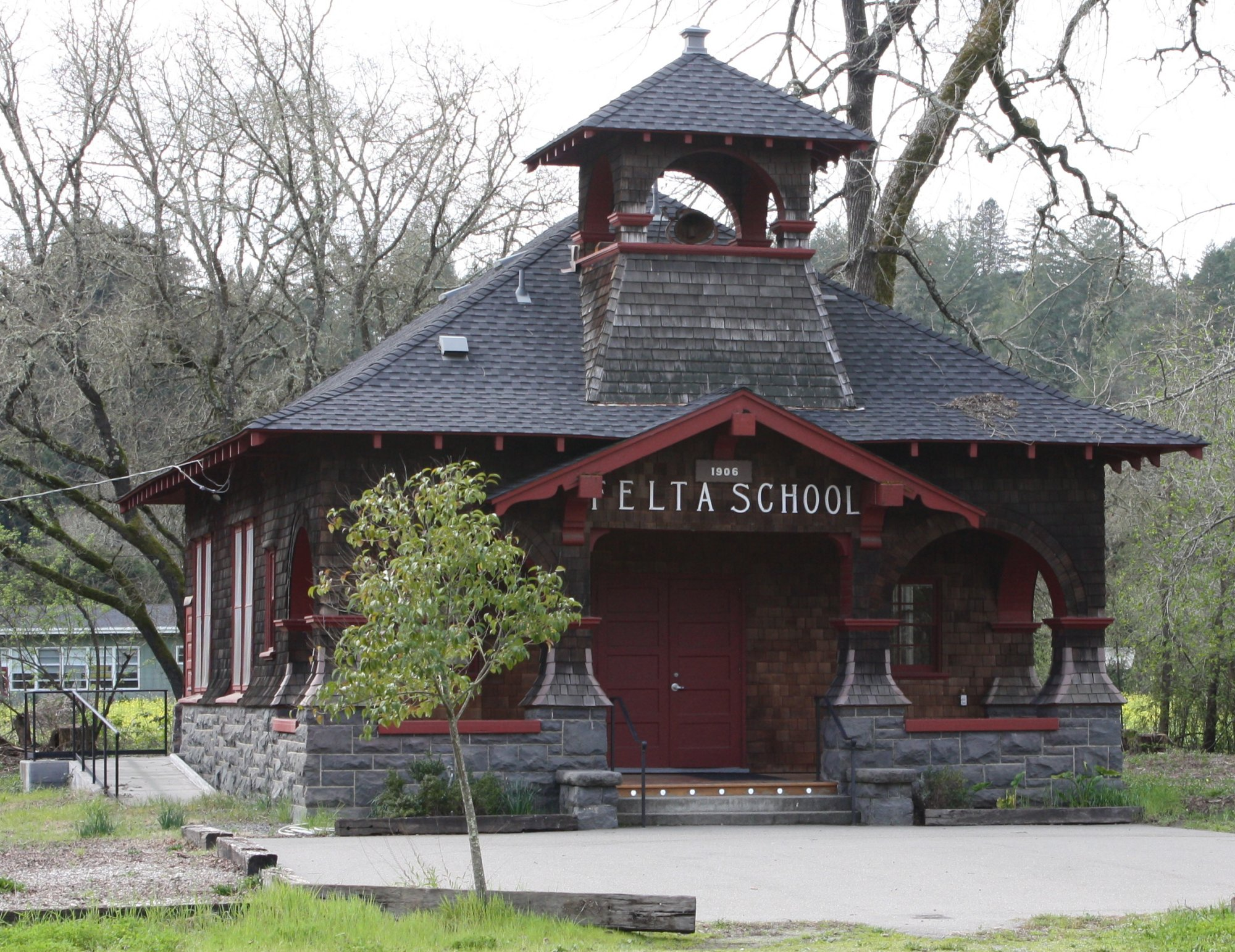
The Felta Schoolhouse in Sonoma County, California, was built in 1906 and closed on November 27, 1951.

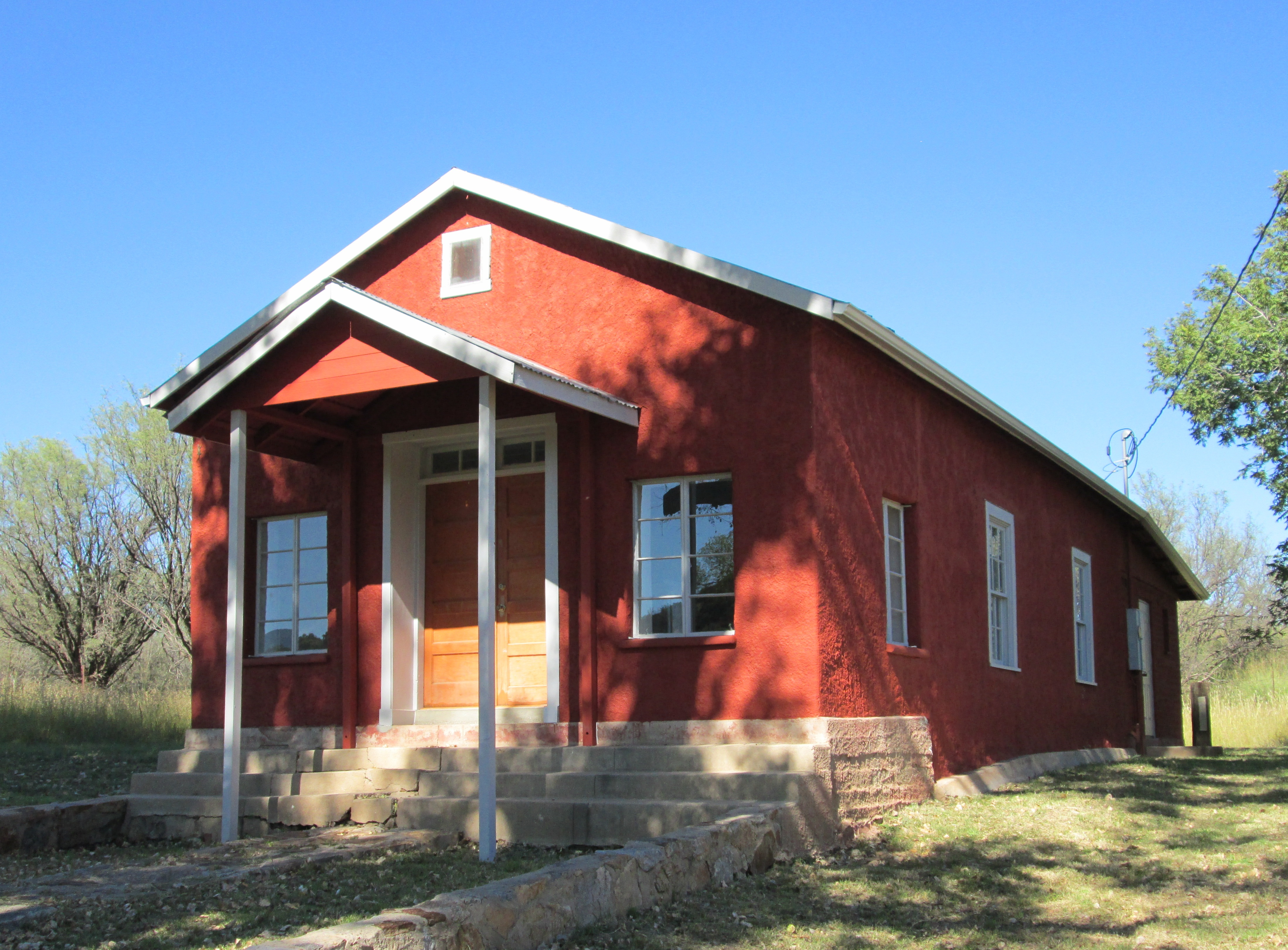
The one-room adobe schoolhouse in Lochiel, Arizona

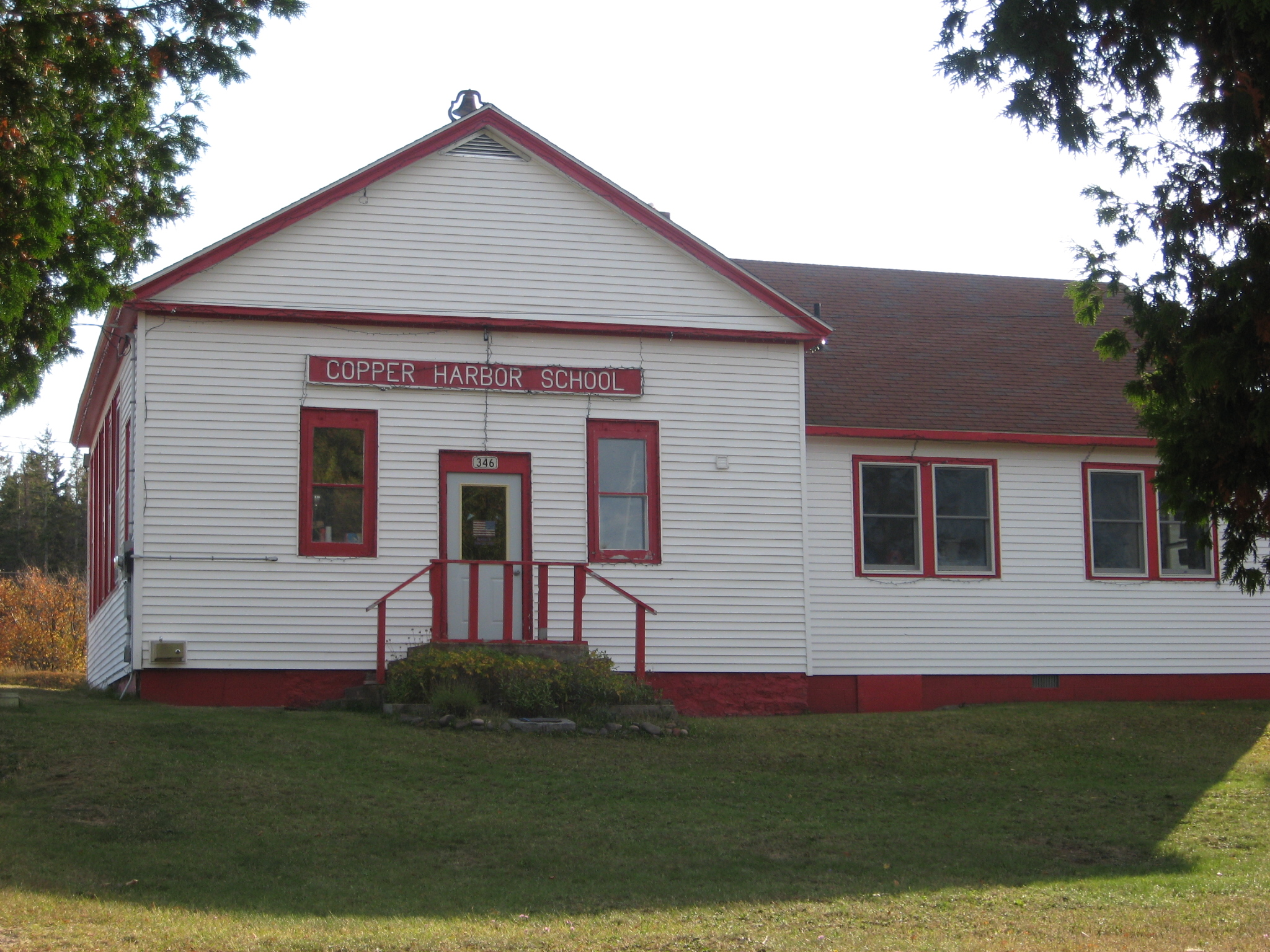
The Copper Harbor Room School

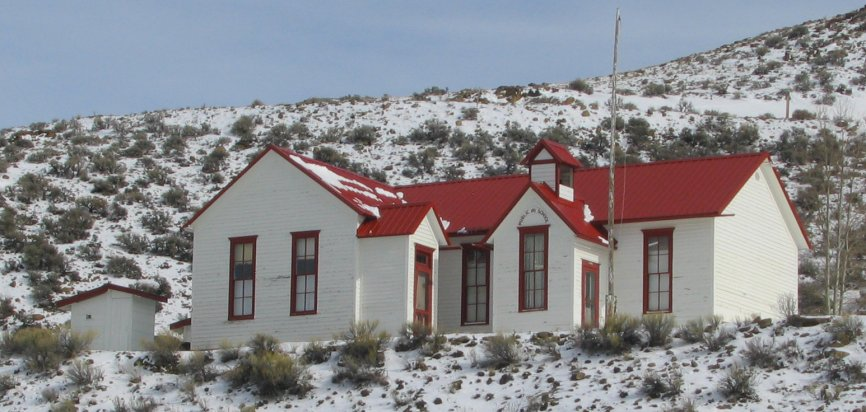
One-room school in Granite, Colorado, in 1954

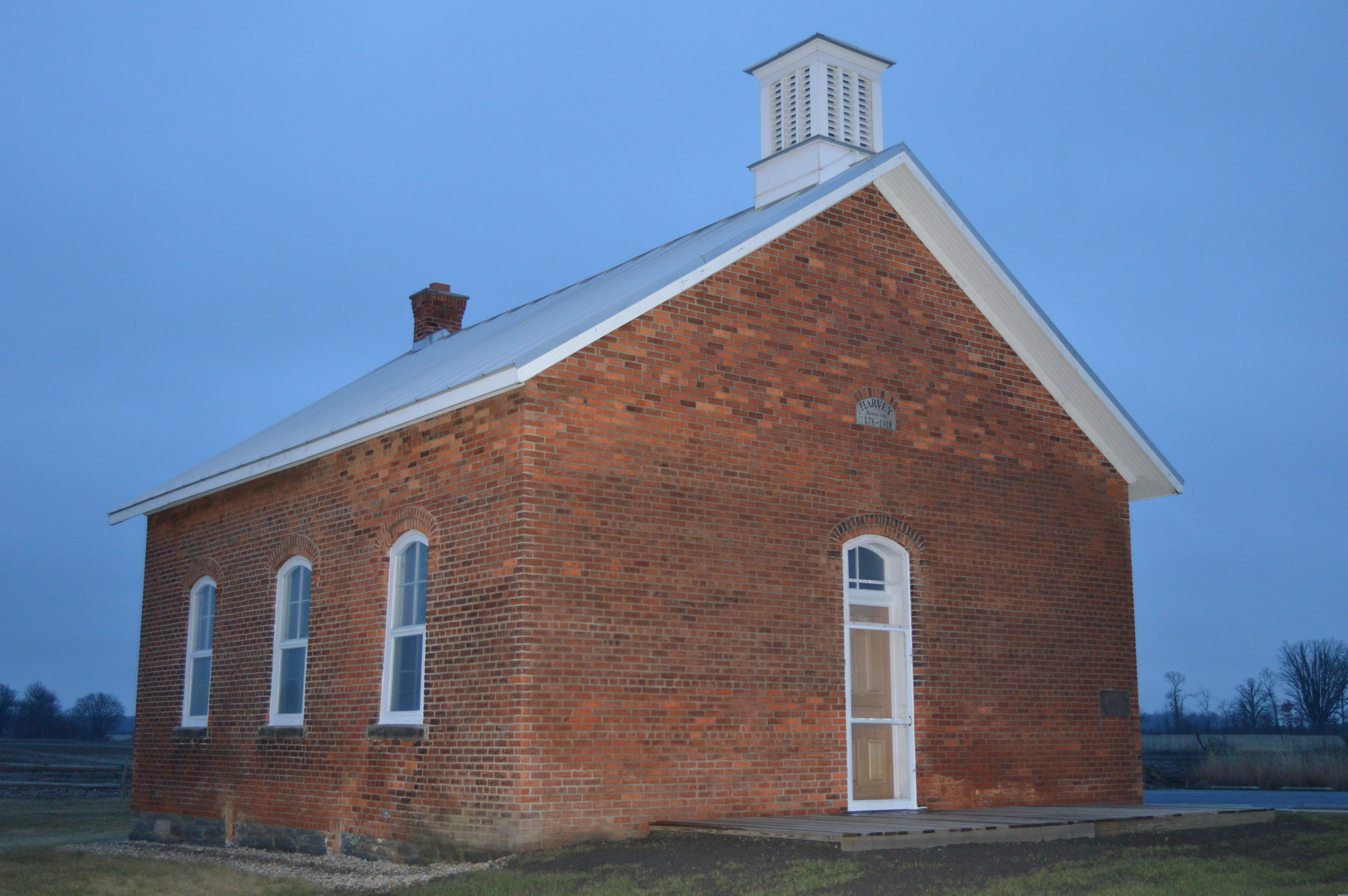
The Harvey One-Room School in Bucyrus Township, Ohio, built in 1876

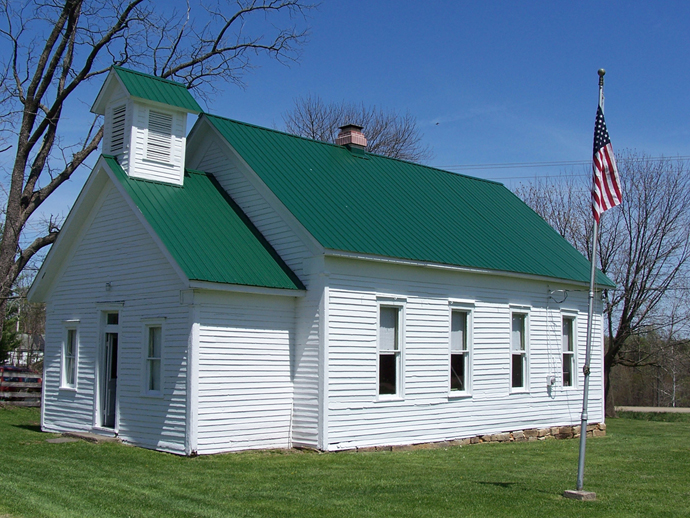
Vandalia, Indiana, Owen County, Lafayette Township District #2 Schoolhouse was completed around 1868 and closed in 1951. It is preserved and maintained by the Vandalia Community Preservation Association.

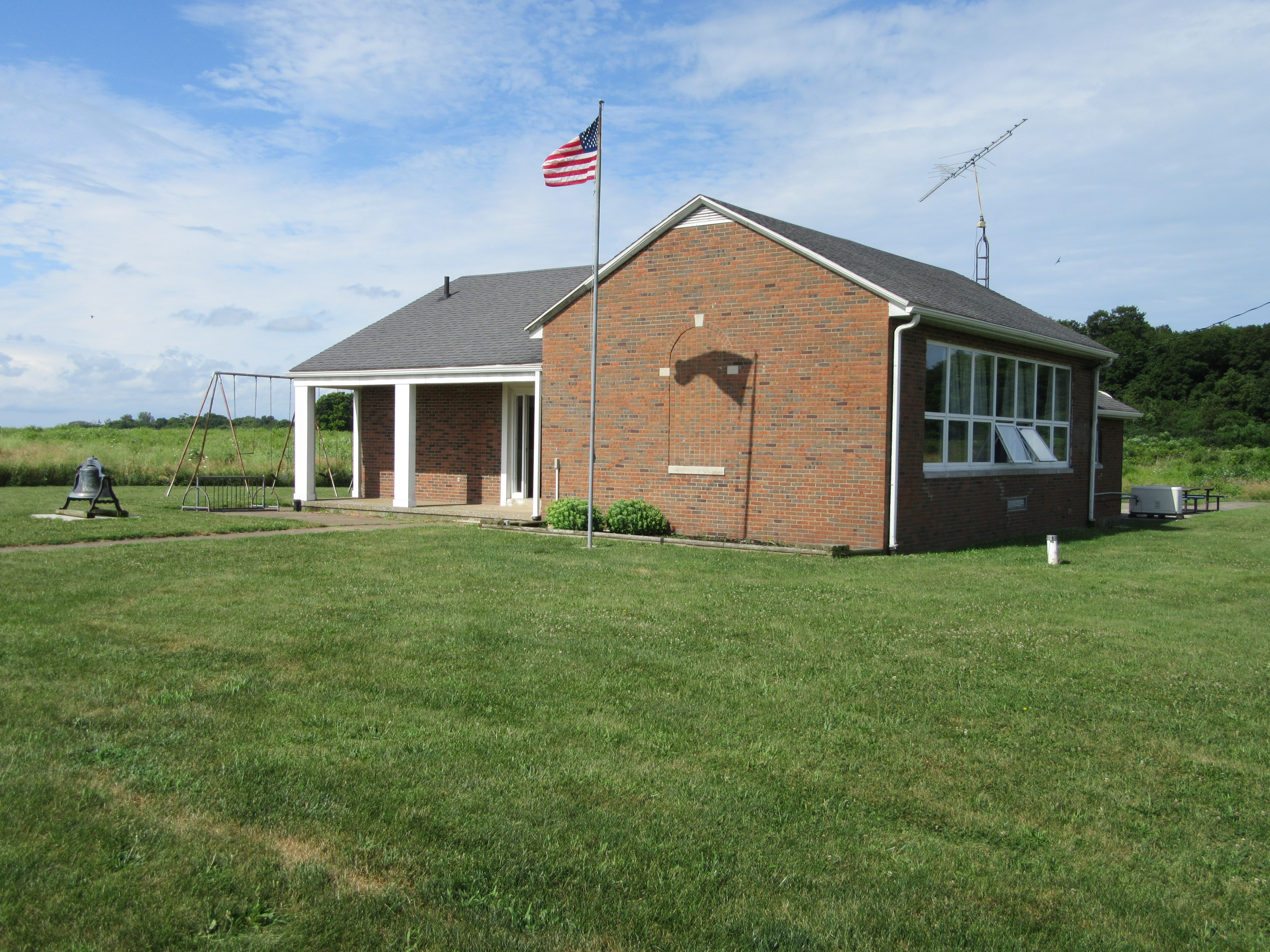
North Bass Island School, a one-room school with teacherage on Isle St. George of the Lake Erie Bass Islands was the last operating one-room school in Ohio. It ceased operations in 2005, and is maintained as an island heritage center. K-8 students attended the school and flew to another island or the mainland for high school.

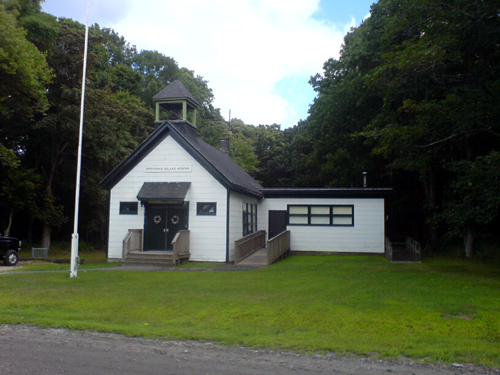
The Prudence Island Schoolhouse on Prudence Island in Portsmouth, Rhode Island, is the last operating one-room school in Rhode Island.

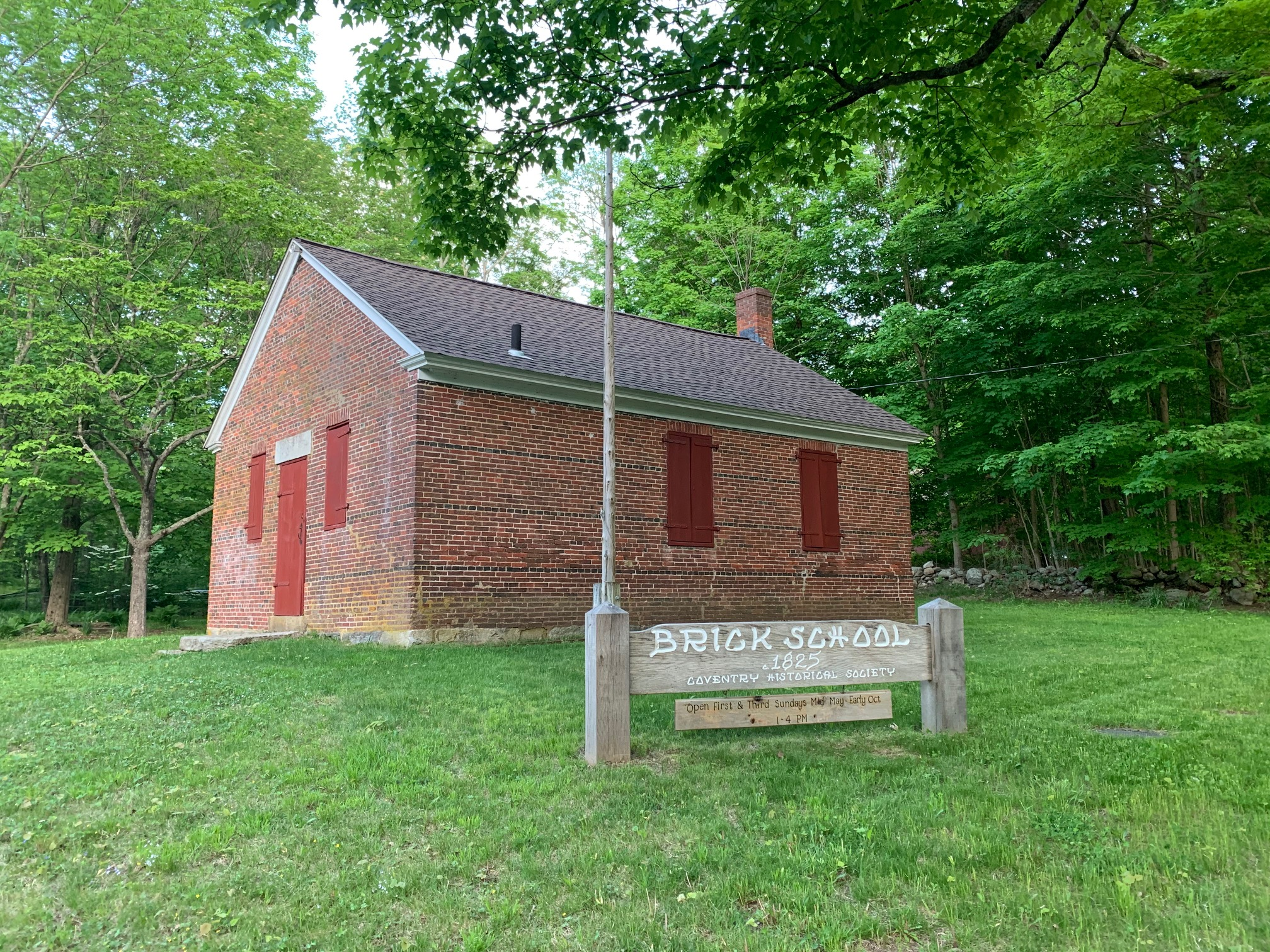
The Brick School House in Coventry, Connecticut, was built in 1825 and closed in 1953. It is now a local museum and the only one-room school open to the public in Connecticut.

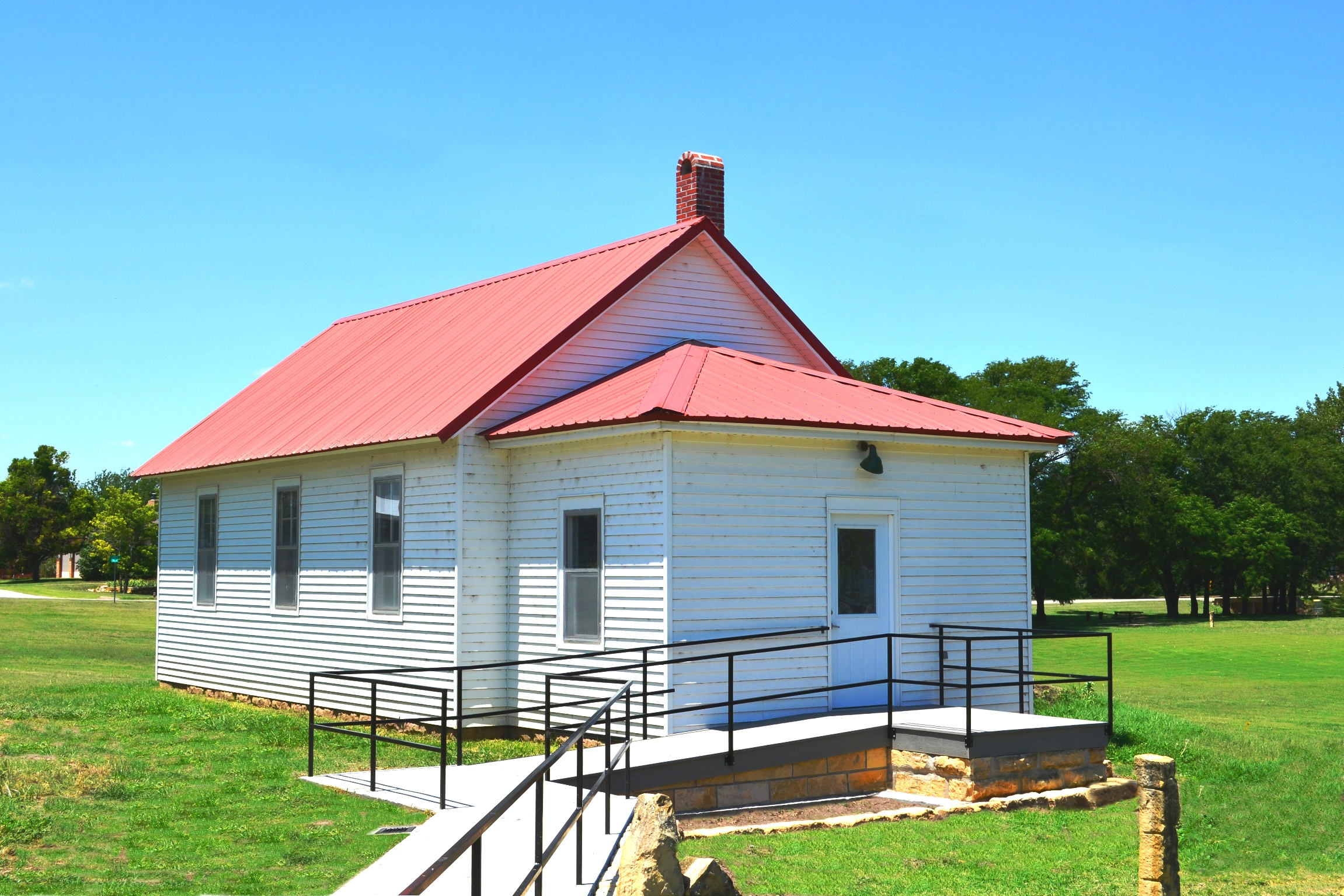
Pleasant Point District 24 One-Room School, Rush County, Kansas. The school opened in 1907 and closed in 1959. Maintained by the Rush County Historical Society.

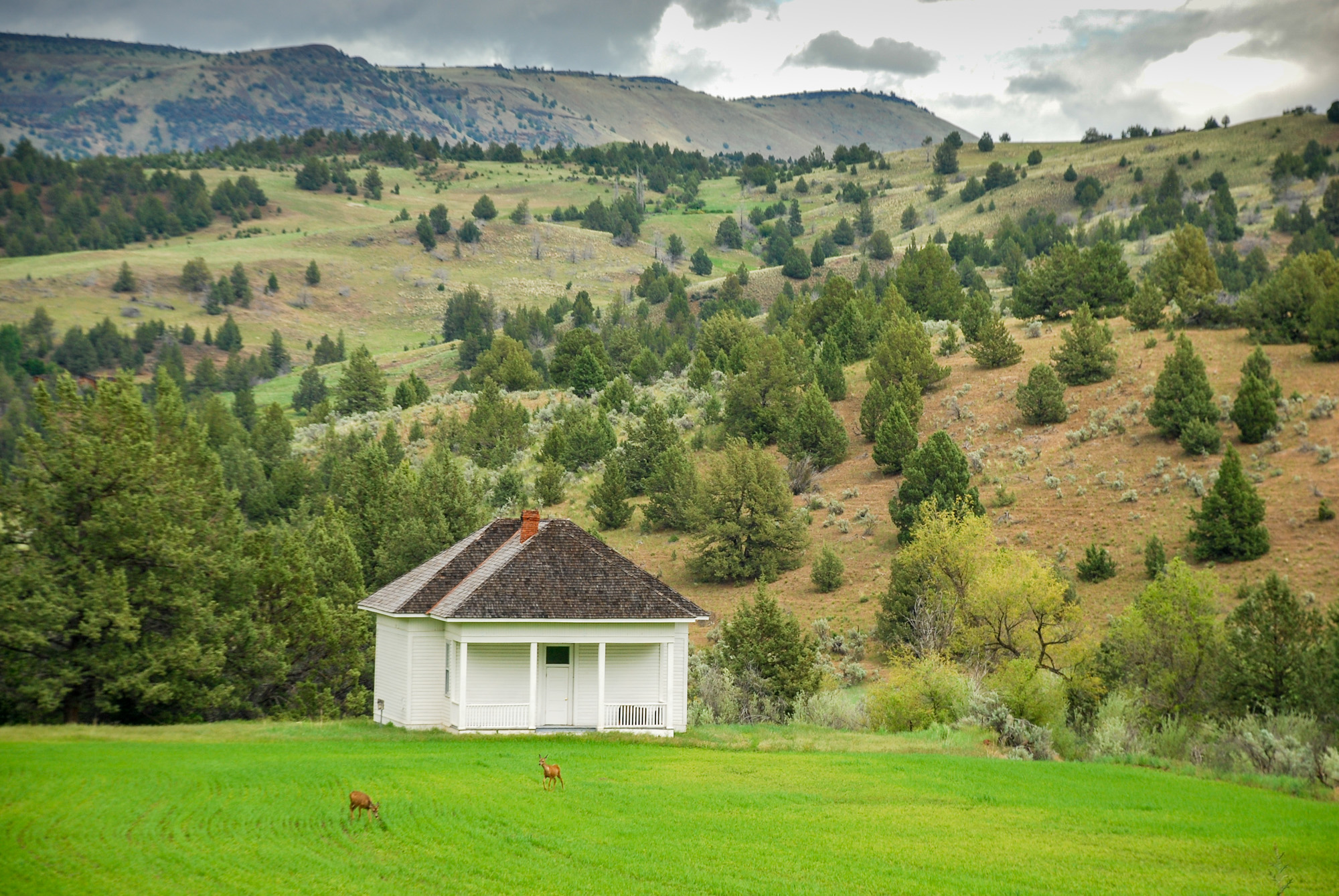
Waldron School, Wheeler County, Oregon. Built in 1879.

== See also ==
- Little Red Schoolhouse
- A-b-c-darian, the youngest students in a one-room school
- Blab school
- Microschool
- Ranch school
- Ungraded school
