= Ashford, Nebraska =

Unincorporated community in Nebraska, United States

- Ghost Town
- Location within Nebraska Location within the United States
- Coordinates: 41.64°N 103.67°W
- Country: United States
- State: Nebraska
- County: Banner

Ashford, now a ghost town, was a community in Banner County, Nebraska, United States. Ashford was named after its first postmaster, William Ashford.

Named the temporary county seat of Banner County on 25 January 1889, it possessed a post office that opened in October 1888 and closed on 24 July 1902.

Ashford was located on Pumpkin Creek, approximately one mile south of Funnel Rock, near the present-day intersection of Nebraska Highway 71, Nebraska Highway 88 (western portion), and Pumpkin Creek Road.
