= Banner County =

Banner County may refer to:

- Banner County, Nebraska, United States
- County Clare, Ireland, nicknamed "the Banner County"
