= Bighorn Mountain =

Mountain in Nebraska, United States

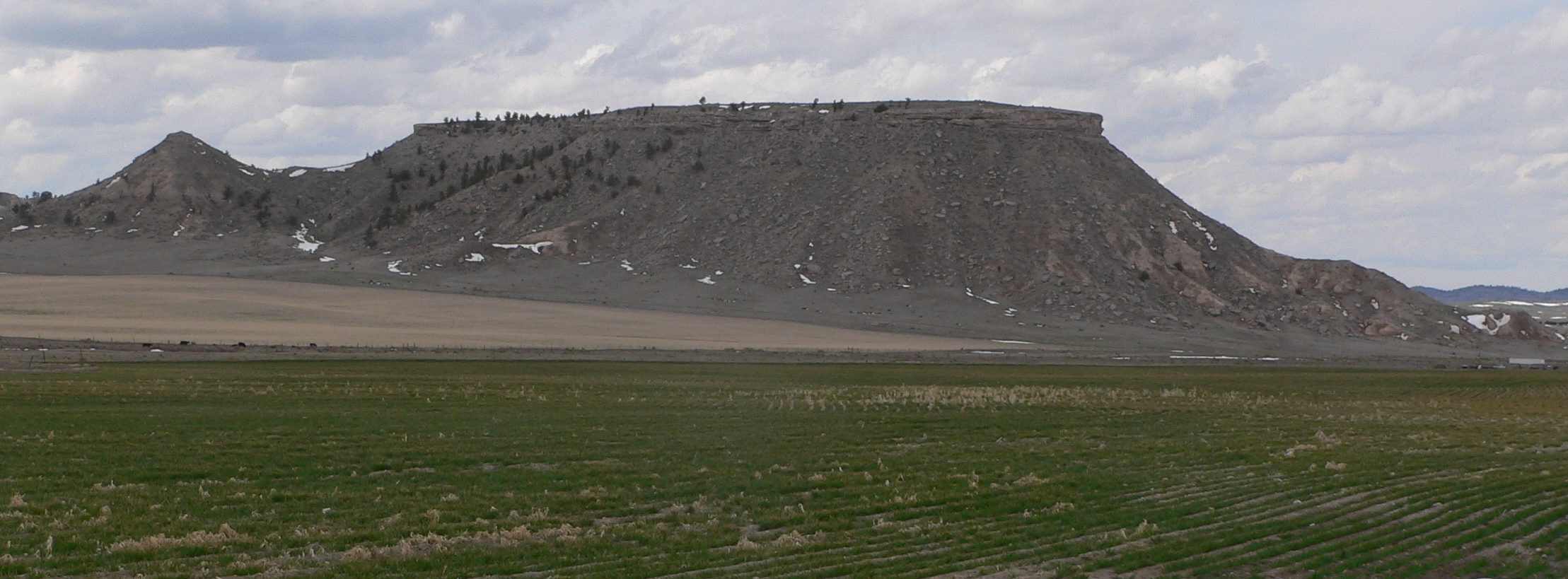
- Bighorn Mountain, seen from the southeast

Highest point
- Elevation: 4,730 ft (1,440 m)
- Coordinates: 41°32′27″N 103°31′55″W

Geography
- Location within Nebraska
- Location: Banner County, Nebraska, U.S.
- Topo map: Indian Springs

Bighorn Mountain, or He Sha, is located in Banner County, about 10.8 miles (17.4 km) east of the county seat of Harrisburg, in the Wildcat Hills of Nebraska, United States.

The peak was named for the bighorn sheep that once roamed its flanks, and were reintroduced in the 1970s.

Many residents of the county have carved their names at the top of the peak; the practice dates back at least to 1887.

== See also ==
- Mountain peaks of North America
