= Nebraska Highway 71 =

State highway in Nebraska, U.S.

State Highway 71
- N-71 highlighted in red

Route information
- Maintained by NDOT
- Length: 170.12 mi (273.78 km)
- Existed: 1962–present

Major junctions
- South end: SH 71 south of Kimball
- I-80 south of Kimball; US 30 in Kimball; N-88 northeast of Harrisburg; N-92 southeast of Scottsbluff; US 26 east of Scottsbluff; N-2 west of Hemingford; US 20 in Crawford
- North end: N-2 / SD 71 northwest of Crawford

Location
- Country: United States
- State: Nebraska
- Counties: Kimball, Banner, Scotts Bluff, Sioux, Box Butte, Dawes

Highway system
- Nebraska State Highway System; Interstate; US; State; Link; Spur; State Spurs; Recreation
← N-70	→ US 73

Nebraska Highway 71 is a highway in western Nebraska. Its southern terminus is at the Colorado border south of Kimball, as a continuation of Colorado State Highway 71. Its northern terminus is at the South Dakota border northwest of Crawford, where it continues as South Dakota Highway 71.

== Route description ==
Nebraska Highway 71 begins south of Kimball at the Colorado border, where it continues from CO 71. It heads northward from Colorado, intersecting I-80 just to the south of Kimball. It then runs east, concurrently, with Interstate 80 to the next exit where it heads north as a by-pass along the eastern side of Kimball. Just before it passes over US 30 it has a junction with Link 53E which provides access to US 30. Further north, the highway meets NE 88 and runs concurrently northward with it for a couple of miles. N-71 splits off to the north at this point, heading to the northeast to bypass Gering. East of Gering, it intersects NE 92 and runs concurrently northward with it. A little to the north, N-71 and N-92 intersect with US 26, and run concurrently to the northwest along it, passing through Scottsbluff.

At the north side of Scottsbluff, N-71 splits off to the north again. The highway continues north into the Nebraska Sandhills, turning to the northeast and east where it intersects with N-2 west of Hemingford. Both highways turn north and about 25 miles (40 km) later enter Crawford and intersect US 20. After leaving Crawford, the highway continues to the northwest, where it runs along the border with South Dakota for about a mile until they terminate at the South Dakota state line with SD 71 south of Ardmore, South Dakota.

== Major intersections ==
County	Location	mi	km	Destinations	Notes
Kimball		0.00	0.00	SH 71 south – Brush	Southern terminus; continuation into Colorado
Kimball		15.17– 15.34	24.41– 24.69	I-80 – Cheyenne, Sidney	Diamond interchange; Southern end of I-80 overlap; I-80 exit 20
Kimball		17.34– 17.50	27.91– 28.16	I-80 – Cheyenne, Sidney	Partial cloverleaf interchange; Northern end of I-80 overlap; I-80 exit 22
Kimball	Kimball	18.53	29.82	L-53E to US 30	Access to US 30 provided via Link 53E
Banner		42.70	68.72	S-4A west	Eastern terminus of S-4A
Banner		43.70	70.33	N-88 east	Southern end of N-88 concurrency
Banner		47.77	76.88	N-88 west	Northern end of N-88 concurrency
Scotts Bluff		58.45– 58.60	94.07– 94.31	5 Rocks Road – Gering	Interchange; northbound exit and southbound entrance only
Scotts Bluff	Gering	61.95	99.70	N-92 east	Partial cloverleaf interchange; southern end of N-92 concurrency
Scotts Bluff		63.97	102.95	Beltline Highway East – Scottsbluff	Partial interchange; northbound exit only
Scotts Bluff		64.54	103.87	US 26 east	Southern end of US 26 concurrency
Scotts Bluff	Scottsbluff	67.95	109.35	US 26 / N-92 west	Northern end of US 26 concurrency
Sioux	No major junctions				
Box Butte		114.95	184.99	N-2 east	Southern end of N-2 concurrency
Dawes		140.79	226.58	US 20 west – Lusk	Southern end of US 20 concurrency
Dawes	Crawford	141.65	227.96	US 20 east – Chadron	Northern end of US 20 concurrency
Dawes		170.12	273.78	N-2 ends SD 71 north	Northern end of N-2 concurrency; western terminus of N-2; northern terminus of N-71; continues into South Dakota as SD 71
1.000 mi = 1.609 km; 1.000 km = 0.621 mi: Concurrency terminus; Incomplete access
