= Gomer School =

Schoolhouse in Fairfield, California, United States

Coordinates: 38°15′48″N 122°05′31″W

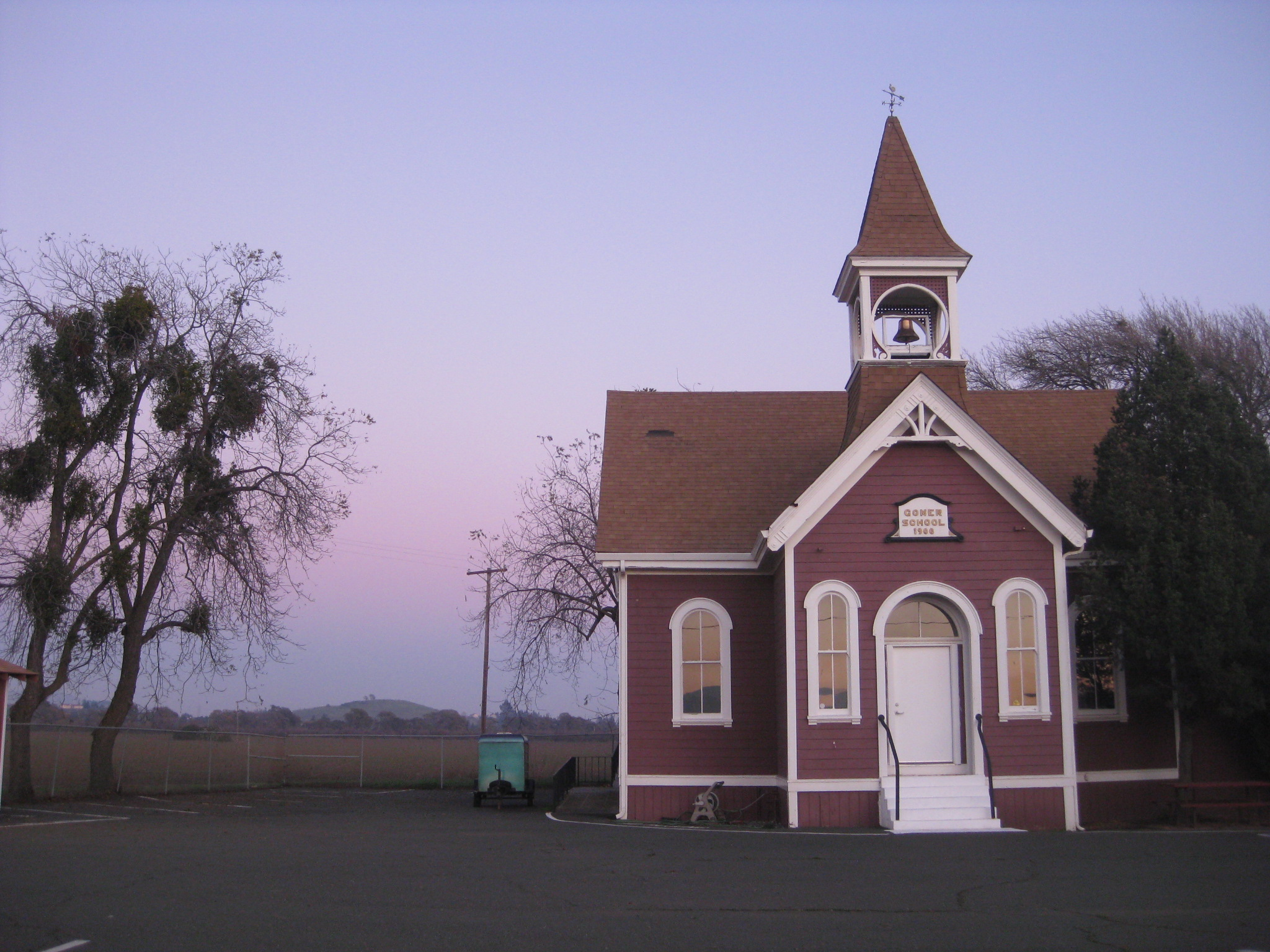
The Gomer School in 2011

Gomer School is a historic schoolhouse at 4522 Abernathy Rd. in Fairfield, California. It was built in 1900.

== History ==
Another schoolhouse preceded the Gomer School, the Suisun School No. 2, built in 1857. It burned down in 1900 and the one-room Gomer School was built on the site the same year thanks to land donor William Gomer, a North Carolina native. The building was too small to accommodate all of the area's students, so a second room was added in 1926. The school served the Suisun Valley until July 1957, when the school board was disbanded and the school was absorbed into the Suisun School District. In 1959, the superintendent turned Gomer into a school for the cognitively impaired. It was then that indoor plumbing and a kitchen were installed and an addition was built to be used as a bakery and restaurant; the concept was that students would gain practical experience and public exposure.

In the late 1980s, the Gomer School Historical Association was formed, becoming a non-profit organization in April 1988 with the goal of turning the schoolhouse into a mini museum. The building was restored, including making the space accessible for meetings and gatherings.

In September 2012, the Solano County Board of Education voted to declare the property as surplus, meaning it would be leased or sold.

In 2021, the Gomer School became home to the boutique Farmer’s Closet, overseen by sisters Amber Blanc and Lacy DeQuattro.
