= Pumpkin Creek (Nebraska) =

Coordinates: 41.6335853°N 103.0246517°W

Pumpkin Creek Gonneville Creek

Location
- Country: United States
- State: Nebraska
- Region: Great Plains

Physical characteristics
- Source
  - location: Scotts Bluff County, Nebraska
  - elevation: 4,600 ft (1,400 m)
- Mouth: North Platte River
  - location: Banner County, Nebraska southeast of Bridgeport, Nebraska
  - elevation: 3,500 ft (1,100 m)
- Length: 50 mi (80 km)
- Basin size: 450,700 mi^{2} (1,167,000 km^{2})
- Discharge
  - average: 10.8 cu ft/s (0.31 m^{3}/s)

Pumpkin Creek is a stream in Morrill County and Banner County, Nebraska in the United States.

== Name ==
Pumpkin Creek, originally known as Gonneville Creek, was named for the numerous wild pumpkins found along its banks. Sources differ as to whether these were naturally occurring or were planted in the area by the Pawnee.

== Description ==
Pumpkin Creek begins at approximately 4,600 feet above sea level in southwest Scotts Bluff County. From its headwaters, the creek flows approximately 50 miles eastward at an average gradient of 20–21 feet per mile. Pumpkin Creek drains into the North Platte River southeast of Bridgeport at an altitude of approximately 3,500 feet.

== Water Depletion and Response ==
Pumpkin Creek is an important source of irrigation water in Banner County, Nebraska. In recent years, drought and agricultural irrigation have severely depleted the water of Pumpkin Creek. The 450,700-acre Pumpkin Creek watershed receives about 16 inches of precipitation annually.

According to the United States Geological Survey, in 1932, Pumpkin Creek discharged an average of 33.2 cubic feet of water per second annually. The average annual discharge of Pumpkin Creek has not exceeded 30 cubic feet of water per second since 1967, and has not exceeded 20 cubic feet of water per second since 1974 with the exception of 1988. In 1991, the most recent year that data was recorded at Pumpkin Creek by the USGS, Pumpkin Creek discharged an average of only 10.8 cubic feet of water per second.

In 1996, the Nebraska Legislature passed LB 108 to address the issues of drought and surface and groundwater depletion across the state, authorizing the 23 Natural Resource Districts statewide to regulate ground and surface water usage. Subsequently, the Nebraska Department of Natural Resources stopped issuing new surface water usage rights to Pumpkin Creek to combat low stream flow. LB 108 allowed the North Platte Natural Resources District to interdict the drilling of new irrigation wells in the Pumpkin Creek watershed in 2001 and a 14-acre-inch irrigation usage limit in 2004.

== See also ==
- List of rivers of Nebraska
