= Pumpkin Creek Site =

The Pumpkin Creek Site (Lv-49) is an archaeological site dating from the Archaic period in northern Love County, Oklahoma, which is along Oklahoma's border with Texas. The site was occupied from 9,500 to 7,000 BP. Evidence indicates the site was occupied while humans made tools from high quality stone found here and then departed the site, returning when additional stone tools were needed. It is estimated that only 5% of the original site remains due to heavy erosion. It is 2 acres (0.81 ha) and lies on a hillside. Artifacts have been donated to the Stovall Museum, now the Sam Noble Oklahoma Museum of Natural History. During its use, there was more rainfall and vegetation in the present day. Humans ceased using the site circa 7,000 BP when the region became very dry and arid.

== See also ==
- Archaeology of the Americas
