= Harrisburg, Nebraska =

- Census-designated place
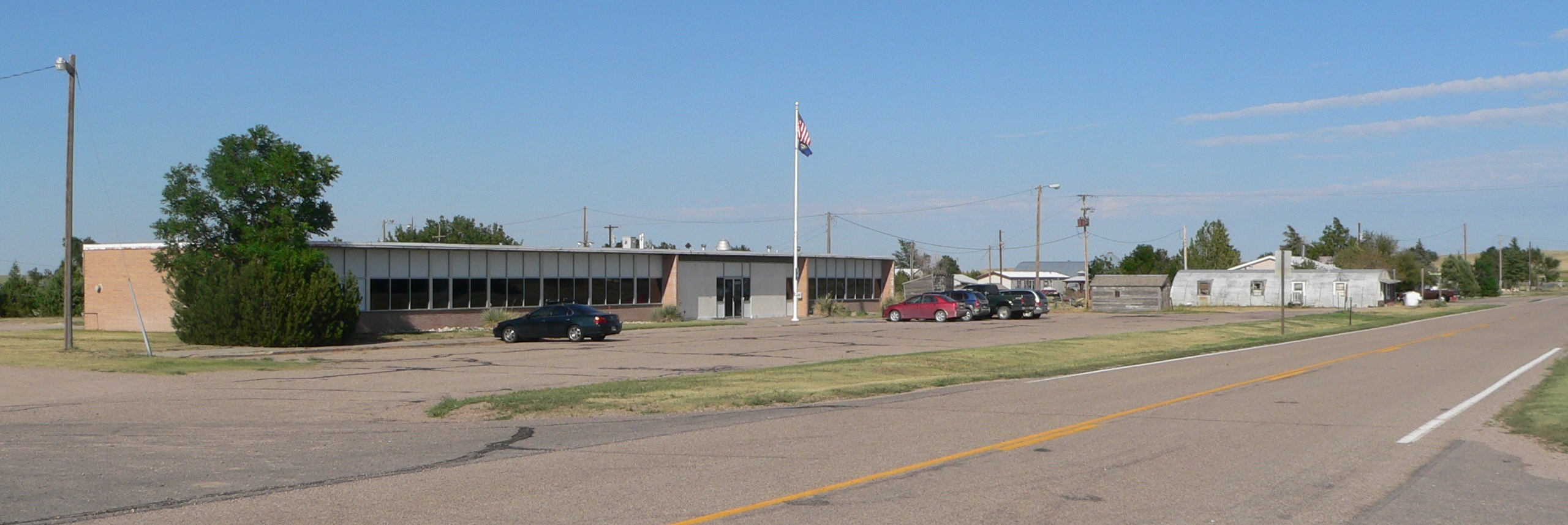
- Downtown with Banner County Courthouse (2010)

- Location within Banner County and Nebraska
- Coordinates: 41°33′02″N 103°43′36″W
- Country: United States
- State: Nebraska
- County: Banner

Area
  - Total: 6.47 sq mi (16.76 km^{2})
  - Land: 6.47 sq mi (16.76 km^{2})
  - Water: 0 sq mi (0.00 km^{2})
- Elevation: 4,629 ft (1,411 m)

Population (2020)
  - Total: 99
  - Density: 15.3/sq mi (5.91/km^{2})
- Time zone: UTC−7 (Mountain (MST))
  - Summer (DST): UTC−6 (MDT)
- ZIP code: 69345
- Area code: 308
- FIPS code: 31-21030
- GNIS feature ID: 2393039

Harrisburg is a census-designated place in and the county seat of Banner County, Nebraska, United States. The population was 99 at the 2020 census.

== History ==
Harrisburg, and all of Banner County, were originally part of Cheyenne County and began with a homestead in 1884. A settlement, at first called Randall and then Centropolis, developed around this and neighboring homesteads. In November, 1888, Cheyenne County subdivided into five counties, and the settlement was included in the territory which became Banner County. Its county seat was originally located at Ashford, a few miles northeast. However, in 1889 Charles Schooley, a settler, donated part of his land for the development of a formal town. A migrant being from Harrisburg, Pennsylvania caused the name to be selected.

Because of its central location, Harrisburg became the home base for stagecoach and mail carrier lines in the county, and the county government moved its operations from Ashford in mid-1891. By 1892, Harrisburg had two hotels, two livery stables, a brickwork, a cheese factory, two banks and three newspapers. It was the principal community for the county, which was almost entirely devoted to wheat farming and cattle ranching. In 1951, oil (which had first been discovered in 1919) became the county's third commodity.

Harrisburg's fortunes rose and fell with the county's. The lack of a railroad line for shipping eventually drew the larger farm and ranch houses to the north, while the 1960s routing of Interstate Highway 80 through Kimball brought the removal of other businesses to the south. Other small hamlets in Banner County collapsed as people moved either north or south, or consolidated their activities around Harrisburg. This movement has allowed Harrisburg to flourish into the 21st century, despite its low resident population.

== Geography ==
According to the United States Census Bureau, the CDP has a total area of 5.3 square miles (14 km^{2}), all land.

=== Climate ===
According to the Köppen Climate Classification system, Harrisburg has a cold semi-arid climate, abbreviated "BSk" on climate maps. The hottest temperature recorded in Harrisburg was 105 °F (40.6 °C) on July 16, 2006, June 24, 2012, and June 27, 2012, while the coldest temperature recorded was −44 °F (−42.2 °C) on December 22, 1989.

Climate data for Harrisburg, Nebraska, 1991–2020 normals, extremes 1961–present
Month	Jan	Feb	Mar	Apr	May	Jun	Jul	Aug	Sep	Oct	Nov	Dec	Year
Record high °F (°C)	74 (23)	78 (26)	83 (28)	89 (32)	97 (36)	105 (41)	105 (41)	103 (39)	101 (38)	90 (32)	81 (27)	76 (24)	105 (41)
Mean maximum °F (°C)	61.5 (16.4)	65.0 (18.3)	74.8 (23.8)	80.8 (27.1)	89.3 (31.8)	95.8 (35.4)	99.6 (37.6)	97.7 (36.5)	94.1 (34.5)	85.0 (29.4)	73.2 (22.9)	63.2 (17.3)	100.7 (38.2)
Mean daily maximum °F (°C)	41.2 (5.1)	43.2 (6.2)	52.5 (11.4)	59.5 (15.3)	68.7 (20.4)	80.8 (27.1)	88.4 (31.3)	86.9 (30.5)	78.0 (25.6)	63.3 (17.4)	51.1 (10.6)	41.3 (5.2)	62.9 (17.2)
Daily mean °F (°C)	27.5 (−2.5)	29.1 (−1.6)	37.4 (3.0)	44.2 (6.8)	54.0 (12.2)	64.6 (18.1)	71.8 (22.1)	69.8 (21.0)	60.3 (15.7)	46.7 (8.2)	35.7 (2.1)	27.3 (−2.6)	47.4 (8.5)
Mean daily minimum °F (°C)	13.9 (−10.1)	14.9 (−9.5)	22.2 (−5.4)	29.0 (−1.7)	39.2 (4.0)	48.4 (9.1)	55.2 (12.9)	52.7 (11.5)	42.6 (5.9)	30.0 (−1.1)	20.4 (−6.4)	13.4 (−10.3)	31.8 (−0.1)
Mean minimum °F (°C)	−12.7 (−24.8)	−7.5 (−21.9)	3.5 (−15.8)	12.3 (−10.9)	22.6 (−5.2)	34.5 (1.4)	43.5 (6.4)	40.6 (4.8)	27.3 (−2.6)	10.8 (−11.8)	−2.8 (−19.3)	−11.2 (−24.0)	−19.8 (−28.8)
Record low °F (°C)	−35 (−37)	−31 (−35)	−23 (−31)	−16 (−27)	12 (−11)	26 (−3)	35 (2)	32 (0)	13 (−11)	−10 (−23)	−23 (−31)	−44 (−42)	−44 (−42)
Average precipitation inches (mm)	0.31 (7.9)	0.52 (13)	1.02 (26)	1.80 (46)	2.71 (69)	2.41 (61)	1.89 (48)	1.81 (46)	1.45 (37)	1.45 (37)	0.66 (17)	0.49 (12)	16.52 (419.9)
Average snowfall inches (cm)	5.5 (14)	8.2 (21)	7.1 (18)	6.0 (15)	1.6 (4.1)	0.0 (0.0)	0.0 (0.0)	0.0 (0.0)	0.6 (1.5)	4.2 (11)	5.0 (13)	8.4 (21)	46.6 (118.6)
Average extreme snow depth inches (cm)	4.7 (12)	4.6 (12)	4.3 (11)	3.4 (8.6)	1.3 (3.3)	0.0 (0.0)	0.0 (0.0)	0.0 (0.0)	0.3 (0.76)	2.8 (7.1)	3.8 (9.7)	5.8 (15)	9.5 (24)
Average precipitation days (≥ 0.01 in)	4.1	5.3	5.6	8.7	10.4	9.2	7.4	6.6	5.7	6.4	4.2	4.6	78.2
Average snowy days (≥ 0.1 in)	3.8	5.5	3.8	2.4	0.7	0.0	0.0	0.0	0.2	1.4	2.9	4.5	25.2
Source 1: NOAA
Source 2: National Weather Service

== Demographics ==
Historical population
Census	Pop.	Note	%±
2000	75		—
2010	100		33.3%
2020	99		−1.0%
U.S. Decennial Census

Harrisburg is part of the Scottsbluff, Nebraska Micropolitan Statistical Area.

=== Harrisburg CDP ===
As of the census of 2000, there were 75 people, 31 households, and 23 families residing in the CDP. The population density was 14.0 people per square mile (5.4/km^{2}). There were 33 housing units at an average density of 6.2/sq mi (2.4/km^{2}). The racial makeup of the CDP was 98.67% White, and 1.33% from two or more races. Hispanic or Latino of any race were 2.67% of the population.

There were 31 households, out of which 19.4% had children under the age of 18 living with them, 71.0% were married couples living together, 3.2% had a female householder with no husband present, and 22.6% were non-families. 16.1% of all households were made up of individuals, and 9.7% had someone living alone who was 65 years of age or older. The average household size was 2.42 and the average family size was 2.63.

In the CDP, the population was spread out, with 21.3% under the age of 18, 6.7% from 18 to 24, 14.7% from 25 to 44, 36.0% from 45 to 64, and 21.3% who were 65 years of age or older. The median age was 49 years. For every 100 females, there were 127.3 males. For every 100 females age 18 and over, there were 110.7 males.

The median income for a household in the CDP was $47,083, and the median income for a family was $50,625. Males had a median income of $43,750 versus $11,563 for females. The per capita income for the CDP was $19,992. There were no families and 2.7% of the population living below the poverty line, including no under eighteens and none of those over 64.

== See also ==
- Big Horn Mountain
