= Banner County, Nebraska =

County in Nebraska, United States

- County
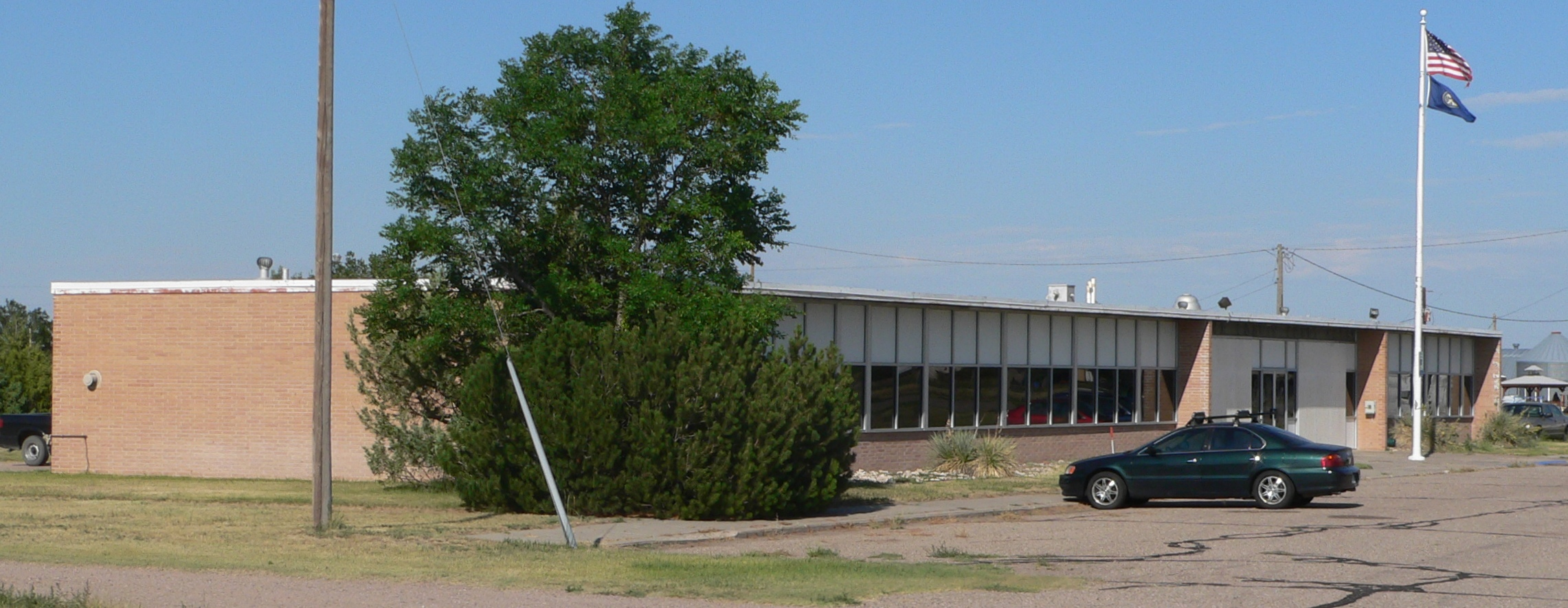
- The Banner County Courthouse in Harrisburg

- Seal

- Location within the U.S. state of Nebraska
- Coordinates: 41.53975°N 103.726263°W
- Country: United States
- State: Nebraska
- Founded: November 6, 1888
- Seat: Harrisburg
- Largest community: Harrisburg

Area
  - Total: 746.190 sq mi (1,932.62 km^{2})
  - Land: 746.039 sq mi (1,932.23 km^{2})
  - Water: 0.151 sq mi (0.39 km^{2}) 0.02%

Population (2020)
  - Total: 674
  - Estimate (2025): 686 ▲
  - Density: 0.903/sq mi (0.349/km^{2})
- Time zone: UTC−7 (Mountain)
  - Summer (DST): UTC−6 (MDT)
- Area code: 308
- Congressional district: 3rd
- Website: bannercountyne.gov
- • Nebraska county number 04 • Nebraska license plate prefix 85

Banner County is a county in the western part of the U.S. state of Nebraska in the Great Plains region of the United States. As of the 2020 census, its population was 674, and was estimated to be 686 in 2025. The county seat and the largest community is the unincorporated community of Harrisburg; there are no incorporated municipalities within the county. Banner County is part of the Scottsbluff, NE micropolitan area.

In the Nebraska license plate system, Banner County was represented by the prefix "85" (as it had the 85th-largest number of vehicles registered in the state when the license plate system was established in 1922).

== History ==
Banner County was created on November 6, 1888.

When Nebraska became a state in 1867, a single county encompassed the entire Panhandle. In 1870, the Panhandle's southern half was organized as Cheyenne County. The arrival of increasing numbers of settlers led to the partitioning of the county in 1888: the eastern third became Deuel County; the middle third became present-day Cheyenne County; and the western third became Kimball, Scotts Bluff, and Banner Counties. The last of these was named by citizens who declared it would become the state's "banner county", and "the brightest star in the constellation of Nebraska counties".

Upon the county's organization, the settlement of Ashford was chosen as the temporary county seat. Four communities aspired to be chosen as the permanent county seat: Ashford, Harrisburg, Freeport, and Banner. Two special elections proved necessary before Harrisburg was chosen.

The initial settlement of the area was by cattle ranchers, drawn by good pastures in the Pumpkin Creek valley. In the late 1880s, these open-range ranchers were displaced by an influx of settlers; by 1890, almost every quarter-section (160 acres, or 65 ha) was claimed by homesteaders. However, the good moisture years that had attracted these settlers were followed by a severe drought in 1893 and 1894, which drove many of the new settlers away; the number of farms in the county declined by more than half, from 565 in 1890 to 226 in 1900. The land thus vacated was again used by ranchers, who raised both crops and cattle. The 1904 passage of the Kinkaid Act, which allowed homesteaders to claim 640 acres (260 ha) brought a new wave of settlers; however, even these larger tracts were often insufficient to support a family, and many of the Kinkaid claims were eventually sold to established cattle ranchers.

The county's growth was hindered by the absence of railroads: the nearest lines ran through Kimball, 11 miles (18 km) to the south, and Gering, 8 miles (13 km) to the north. Roads were also slow to develop in the county: in 1921, only dirt roads existed. The difficulty of reaching markets tended to discourage commercial crop farming in the county.

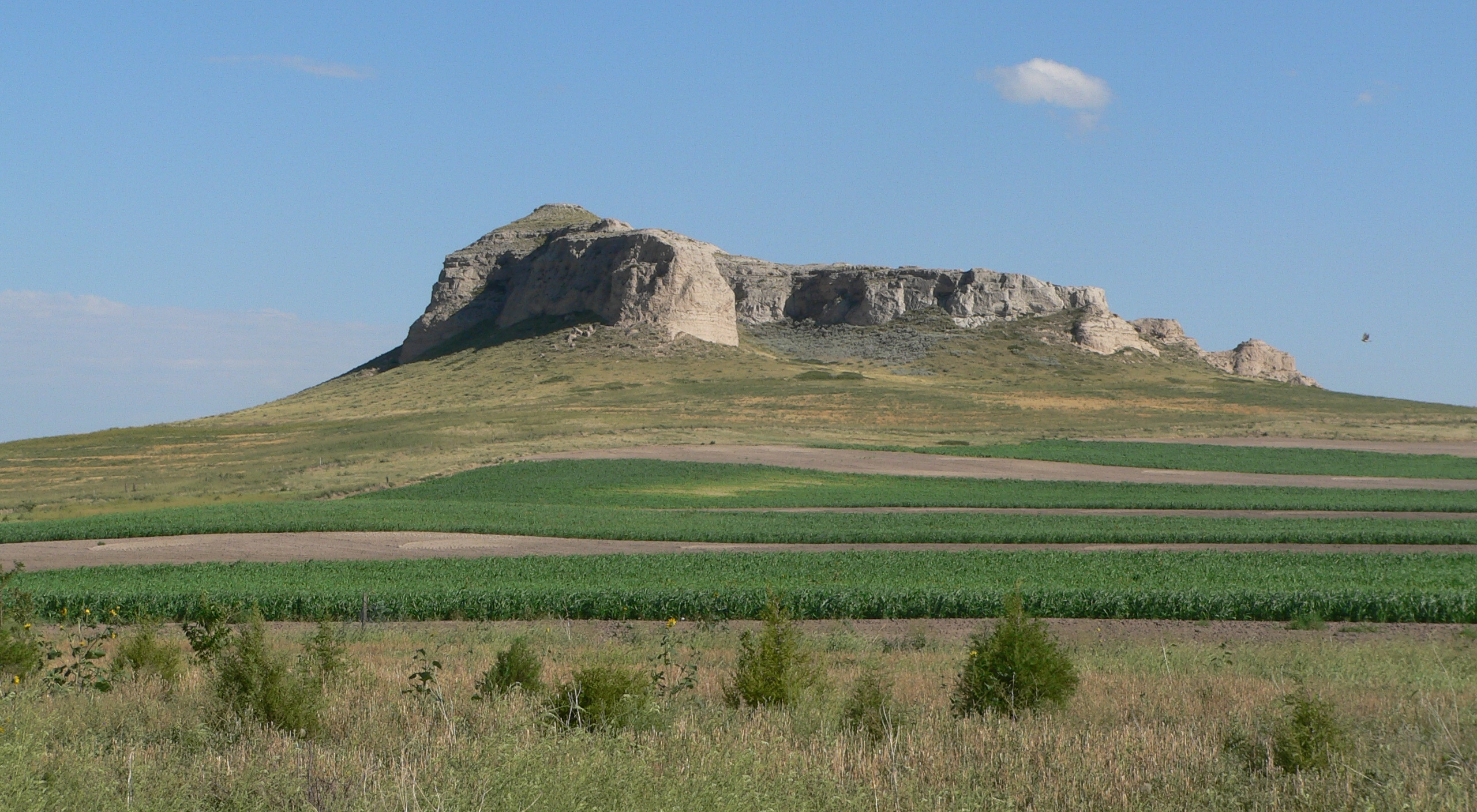
Corn growing near the base of Gabe Rock, west of Harrisburg

=== Irrigation ===
Rainfall in Banner County is light and variable; the average yearly precipitation at the Harrisburg weather station is 14.3 inches (360 mm). Farmers responded by resorting to irrigation. The first irrigation well was drilled by the late 1920s, and others quickly followed. By the late 20th century, center-pivot irrigation systems were in use through much of the county. By 2000, the Pumpkin Creek basin had approximately 500 registered irrigation wells. Groundwater pumping combined with drought conditions ended surface flow in Pumpkin Creek by 1993, and significantly reduced the valley's groundwater levels. In 2001, the North Platte Natural Resources District, which regulates water use in the watershed, declared a moratorium on the drilling of new wells, and limited existing operations to 14 inches (360 mm) of irrigation water per year. Complicating matters, lawsuits were filed contending water use in the Pumpkin Creek valley depleted flows into Lake McConaughy and interfered with the prior water rights of downstream irrigators.

=== ICBMs ===
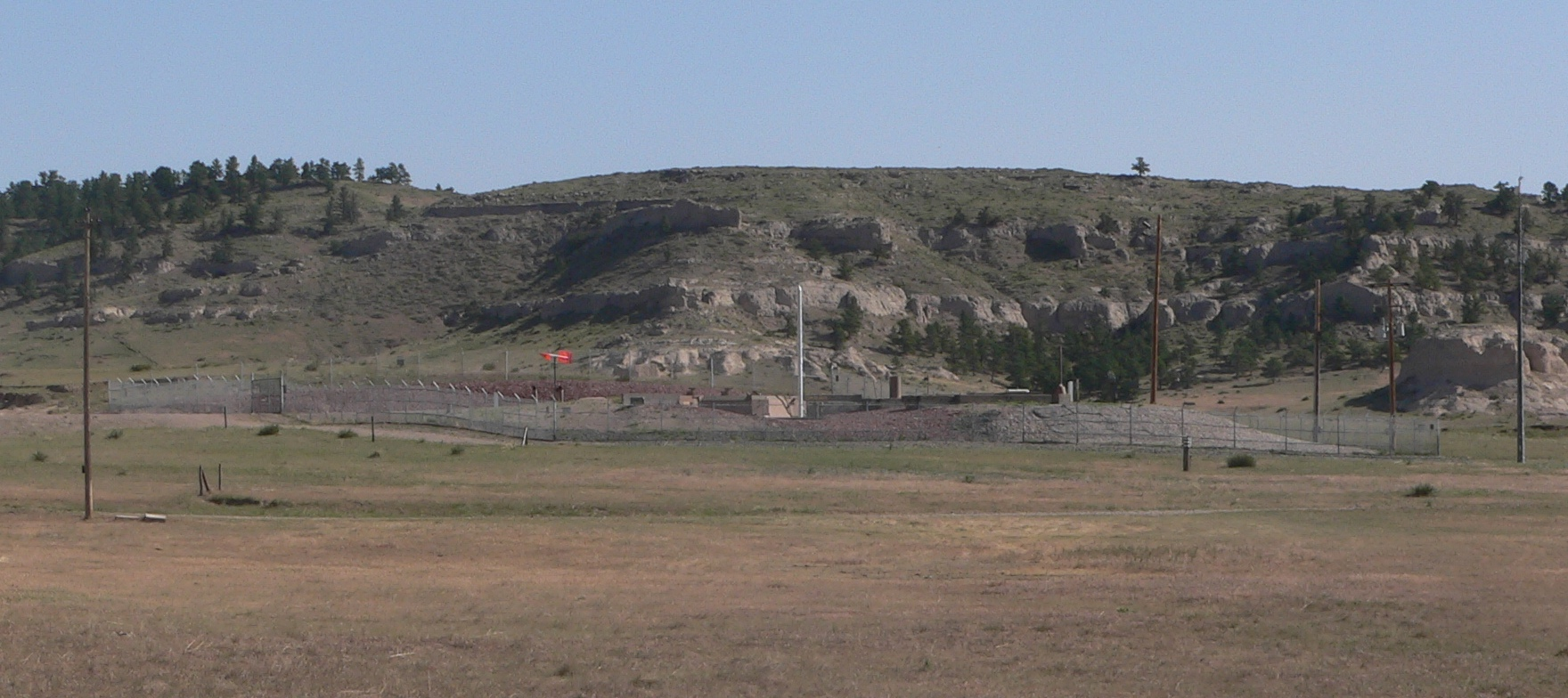
ICBM silo on southern slope of Wildcat Hills in Banner County

Beginning in the early 1960s, intercontinental ballistic missiles (ICBMs), based at Warren Air Force Base near Cheyenne, Wyoming, were installed in western Nebraska, Wyoming, and Colorado. From 1960 to 1963, 90 Atlas sites were constructed in Nebraska. Construction of the launch sites, and upgrading of the roads leading to them, led to an economic boom in western Nebraska. Beginning in 1963, the Atlas series was replaced by Minuteman missiles, which used solid instead of liquid fuel, and which were launched from underground silos. In the 1970s, there were 82 Minuteman III sites in the Panhandle, of which 20 were located in Banner County.

== Geography ==
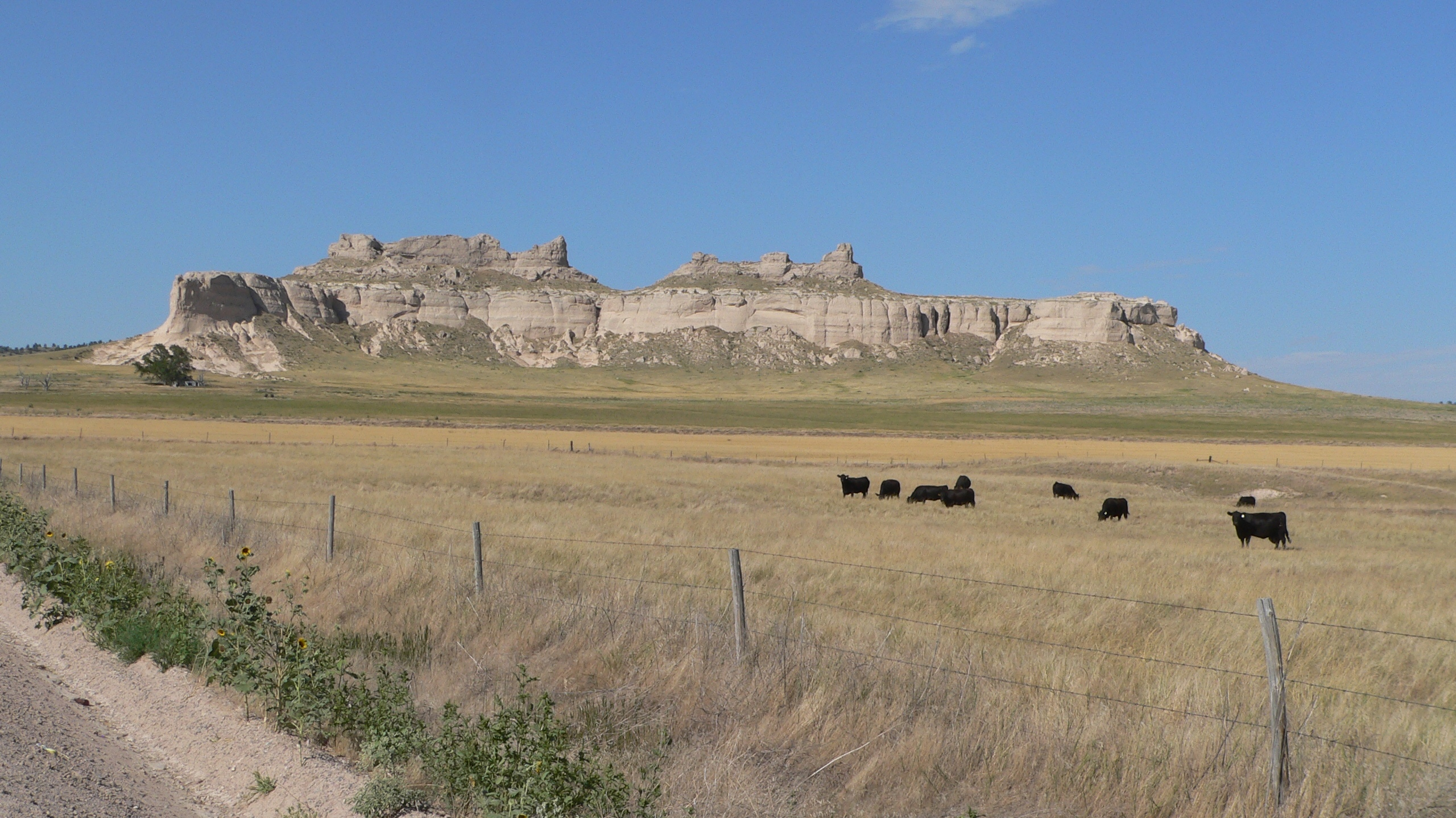
Cattle grazing near buttes on north side of Pumpkin Creek Valley

According to the United States Census Bureau, the county has a total area of 746.190 square miles (1,932.62 km^{2}), of which 746.039 square miles (1,932.23 km^{2}) is land and 0.151 square miles (0.39 km^{2}) (0.02%) is water. It is the 30th-largest county in Nebraska by total area.

Banner County lies on what was once a tableland sloping away from the Rocky Mountains. Over geologic history, it was eroded by Pumpkin Creek and other watercourses, and much of the county now lies below the original High Plains level. The county can be divided into four major geographic divisions: the low-lying and relatively flat valley of Pumpkin Creek, which occupies about 40% of the county's area; a tableland, in places smooth and in others deeply dissected, occupying the southern one-third of the county; the Wildcat Hills, a highly dissected escarpment that crosses the county's northwestern portion; and a small portion of the North Platte River valley in the county's northeastern corner.

=== Adjacent counties ===
The western edge of Banner County abuts the eastern border of the state of Wyoming.

- Scotts Bluff County – north
- Morrill County – east
- Cheyenne County – southeast
- Kimball County – south
- Laramie County, Wyoming – west
- Goshen County, Wyoming – northwest

=== Highways ===
- Nebraska Highway 88 – runs generally east–west, from Bridgeport to La Grange, Wyoming, passing north of Harrisburg
- Nebraska Highway 71 – runs north–south, from Kimball to Gering, passing east of Harrisburg.

== Demographics ==
Historical population
Census	Pop.	Note	%±
1890	2,435		—
1900	1,114		−54.3%
1910	1,444		29.6%
1920	1,435		−0.6%
1930	1,676		16.8%
1940	1,403		−16.3%
1950	1,325		−5.6%
1960	1,269		−4.2%
1970	1,034		−18.5%
1980	918		−11.2%
1990	852		−7.2%
2000	819		−3.9%
2010	690		−15.8%
2020	674		−2.3%
2025 (est.)	686	▲	1.8%
U.S. Decennial Census; 1790–1960 1900–1990; 1990–2000 2010–2020

Banner County's population peaked at 2,435 in 1890 and has since steadily declined. It is one of the least populated counties of Nebraska.

=== 2020 census ===
As of the 2020 census, there were 674 people, 267 households, and 208 families residing in the county. The population density was 0.90 inhabitants per square mile (0.3/km^{2}). There were 327 housing units at an average density of 0.44 per square mile (0.2/km^{2}). The racial makeup of the county was 91.10% White, 0.00% African American, 0.74% Native American, 0.45% Asian, 0.00% Pacific Islander, 1.93% from some other races and 5.79% from two or more races. Hispanic or Latino people of any race were 7.57% of the population.

The median age was 46.0 years. 23.9% of residents were under the age of 18 and 24.3% of residents were 65 years of age or older. For every 100 females there were 106.7 males, and for every 100 females age 18 and over there were 106.0 males age 18 and over.

0.0% of residents lived in urban areas, while 100.0% lived in rural areas.

There were 267 households in the county, of which 27.7% had children under the age of 18 living with them and 11.2% had a female householder with no spouse or partner present. About 19.9% of all households were made up of individuals and 8.6% had someone living alone who was 65 years of age or older.

There were 327 housing units, of which 18.3% were vacant. Among occupied housing units, 73.0% were owner-occupied and 27.0% were renter-occupied. The homeowner vacancy rate was 0.0% and the rental vacancy rate was 9.6%.

=== 2010 census ===
As of the 2010 census, there were 690 people, 293 households, and 199 families residing in the county. The population density was 0.92 inhabitants per square mile (0.4/km^{2}). There were 369 housing units at an average density of 0.49 per square mile (0.2/km^{2}). The racial makeup of the county was 95.65% White, 0.00% African American, 0.43% Native American, 0.00% Asian, 0.00% Pacific Islander, 3.19% from some other races and 0.72% from two or more races. Hispanic or Latino people of any race were 3.77% of the population.

=== 2000 census ===
As of the 2010 census, there were 819 people, 311 households, and 237 families residing in the county. The population density was 1.10 inhabitants per square mile (0.4/km^{2}). There were 375 housing units at an average density of 0.50 per square mile (0.2/km^{2}). The racial makeup of the county was 95.85% White, 0.12% African American, 0.24% Native American, 0.12% Asian, 0.00% Pacific Islander, 3.05% from some other races and 0.61% from two or more races. Hispanic or Latino people of any race were 5.62% of the population. 31.2% were of German, 14.4% English, 14.1% American, 8.0% Swedish, 6.8% Irish and 5.0% Norwegian ancestry.

There were 311 households, out of which 30.20% had children under the age of 18 living with them, 70.10% were married couples living together, 4.20% had a female householder with no husband present, and 23.50% were non-families. 19.90% of all households were made up of individuals, and 9.60% had someone living alone who was 65 years of age or older. The average household size was 2.63 and the average family size was 3.06.

The county population contained 28.80% under the age of 18, 3.70% from 18 to 24, 24.30% from 25 to 44, 27.20% from 45 to 64, and 16.00% who were 65 years of age or older. The median age was 40 years. For every 100 females there were 108.40 males. For every 100 females age 18 and over, there were 101.00 males.

The median income for a household in the county was $31,339, and the median income for a family was $41,538. Males had a median income of $25,250 versus $18,750 for females. The per capita income for the county was $17,149. About 12.30% of families and 13.60% of the population were below the poverty line, including 19.00% of those under age 18 and 11.10% of those age 65 or over.

== Economy ==
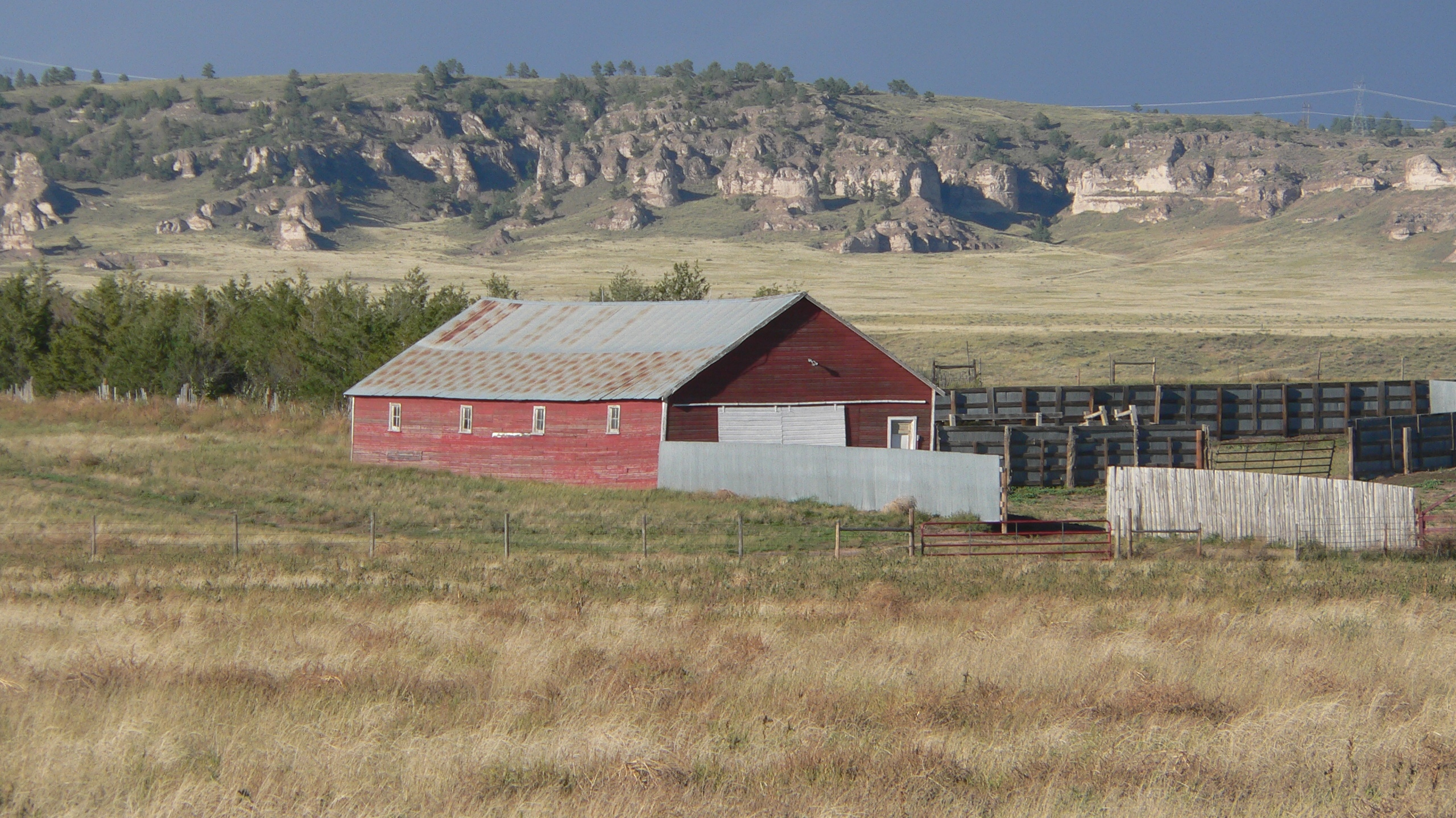
C. C. Hampton homestead machine shed

About 60% of Banner County is given over to farming: chiefly winter wheat and rangeland, but also corn, beans, sugar beets, potatoes, sunflowers, rapeseed, and millet.

In response to groundwater depletion and drought, the Natural Resources Conservation Service has developed a system of cash incentives for farmers in the Pumpkin Creek watershed who convert irrigated cropland to dryland farming.

Oil was discovered in Banner County in 1919, but the deposits were too deep to be commercially viable at that time. Petroleum production in Banner County began in 1951, and peaked in 1960, when 7,000,000 barrels (1,100,000 m^{3}) was produced from 397 wells. By 2009, the number of wells had fallen to about 200, but new discoveries in Weld County, Colorado prompted interest in exploring the Niobrara shale, which lies beneath western Nebraska, northeastern Colorado, and southeastern Wyoming. A 2010 sale of oil leases yielded record prices in Banner and Kimball counties.

== Community ==
=== Census-designated place ===
- Harrisburg

It is the only community in Banner County and the county seat; it is one of two unincorporated county seats in Nebraska.

== Politics ==
Banner County voters are strongly Republican. In only three presidential elections since 1900 has the county selected the Democratic Party candidate. This has only strengthened in recent years, with Republicans winning over 80% of the vote in each of the past seven elections, dating back to 2000.

Political Party	Number of registered voters (February 1, 2026)	Percent
Republican	431	82.88%
Independent	59	11.35%
Democratic	22	4.23%
Libertarian	8	1.54%
Legal Marijuana Now	0	0.00%
Total	520	100.00%

United States presidential election results for Banner County, Nebraska
Year	Republican		Democratic		Third party(ies)	
Year	No.	%	No.	%	No.	%
1900	186	69.92%	71	26.69%	9	3.38%
1904	155	81.58%	18	9.47%	17	8.95%
1908	175	65.30%	74	27.61%	19	7.09%
1912	53	19.41%	56	20.51%	164	60.07%
1916	142	42.77%	166	50.00%	24	7.23%
1920	258	72.47%	69	19.38%	29	8.15%
1924	245	49.80%	88	17.89%	159	32.32%
1928	548	86.30%	81	12.76%	6	0.94%
1932	285	43.78%	357	54.84%	9	1.38%
1936	277	42.62%	367	56.46%	6	0.92%
1940	450	66.57%	226	33.43%	0	0.00%
1944	378	71.05%	154	28.95%	0	0.00%
1948	309	57.43%	229	42.57%	0	0.00%
1952	484	77.69%	139	22.31%	0	0.00%
1956	329	64.01%	185	35.99%	0	0.00%
1960	424	66.77%	211	33.23%	0	0.00%
1964	357	64.56%	196	35.44%	0	0.00%
1968	350	71.28%	72	14.66%	69	14.05%
1972	404	80.80%	96	19.20%	0	0.00%
1976	281	54.78%	210	40.94%	22	4.29%
1980	481	90.41%	33	6.20%	18	3.38%
1984	457	87.55%	58	11.11%	7	1.34%
1988	361	75.68%	112	23.48%	4	0.84%
1992	284	59.17%	68	14.17%	128	26.67%
1996	309	76.11%	62	15.27%	35	8.62%
2000	390	84.42%	65	14.07%	7	1.52%
2004	379	86.73%	56	12.81%	2	0.46%
2008	348	83.65%	62	14.90%	6	1.44%
2012	346	84.18%	55	13.38%	10	2.43%
2016	357	88.81%	19	4.73%	26	6.47%
2020	362	88.08%	43	10.46%	6	1.46%
2024	348	89.23%	34	8.72%	8	2.05%

== Education ==
School districts include:

- Banner County Public Schools #1, Harrisburg
- Bayard Public Schools #21, Bayard
- Potter-Dix Schools #9, Dix

== See also ==
- Big Horn Mountain
- National Register of Historic Places listings in Banner County, Nebraska
