= National Register of Historic Places listings in Sheridan County, Nebraska =

Location of Sheridan County in Nebraska

Sheridan County, Nebraska, United States, has 10 properties and districts listed on the National Register of Historic Places.

The locations of National Register properties and districts for which the latitude and longitude coordinates are included below may be seen in a map.

This National Park Service list is complete through NPS recent listings posted October 30, 2026.

== Current listings ==
	Name on the Register	Image	Date listed	Location	City or town	Description
1	Antioch Potash Plants	Antioch Potash Plants	May 16, 1979 (#79001455)	Nebraska Highway 2 at Antioch; 42°04′12″N 102°35′36″W	Antioch	
2	Camp Sheridan and Spotted Tail Indian Agency	Camp Sheridan and Spotted Tail Indian Agency	November 19, 1974 (#74001140)	Address Restricted; 42°51′07″N 102°44′39″W	Hay Springs	
3	Colclesser Bridge		June 29, 1992 (#92000729)	County road over the Niobrara River, 11 miles (18 km) south of Rushville; 42°37′18″N 102°18′48″W	Rushville	
4	District No. 119 North School	District No. 119 North School	August 30, 2010 (#10000606)	South side of Sandy Ave. 42°03′29″N 102°16′38″W	Ellsworth	School Buildings in Nebraska MPS
5	Lee and Gottliebe Fritz House	Lee and Gottliebe Fritz House	November 28, 2003 (#03001213)	132 North Oak; 42°48′16″N 102°12′18″W	Gordon	
6	Gourley's Opera House	Gourley's Opera House	July 6, 1988 (#88000943)	2nd St. 42°43′06″N 102°27′41″W	Rushville	Now the Plains Theater.
7	Loosveldt Bridge		June 29, 1992 (#92000730)	Private ranch road over the Niobrara River, 9.1 miles (14.6 km) southeast of Rushville; 42°34′53″N 102°23′02″W	Rushville	
8	Sheridan County Courthouse	Sheridan County Courthouse	January 10, 1990 (#89002216)	2nd and Sprague Sts. 42°43′04″N 102°27′36″W	Rushville	
9	Spade Ranch	Spade Ranch	February 28, 1980 (#80002464)	23 miles (37 km) northeast of Ellsworth; 42°18′23″N 102°04′47″W	Ellsworth	
10	Spade Ranch Store	Spade Ranch Store	September 3, 2010 (#10000629)	West side of Nebraska Highway 27/Lot 5 of Ellsworth; 42°03′34″N 102°16′52″W	Ellsworth	

== See also ==
- List of National Historic Landmarks in Nebraska
- National Register of Historic Places listings in Nebraska
