= Nebraska Highway 250 =

State highway in Nebraska, U.S.

State Highway 250
- N-250 highlighted in red

Route information
- Maintained by NDOT
- Length: 48.65 mi (78.29 km)
- Existed: 1960–present
- History: 1996: Southern section of current highway added to N-250 designation

Major junctions
- South end: N-2 in Lakeside
- North end: US 20 in Rushville

Location
- Country: United States
- State: Nebraska
- Counties: Sheridan

Highway system
- Nebraska State Highway System; Interstate; US; State; Link; Spur; State Spurs; Recreation
← US 183	→ US 275

Nebraska Highway 250 (N-250) is a 48.64-mile (78.28 km) state highway in Sheridan County, Nebraska, United States, that connects Nebraska Highway 2 (N-2) in Lakeside with U.S. Route 20 (US 20) in Rushville. For its entire length, N-250 is a two-lane road located entirely within rural agricultural area.

== Route description ==
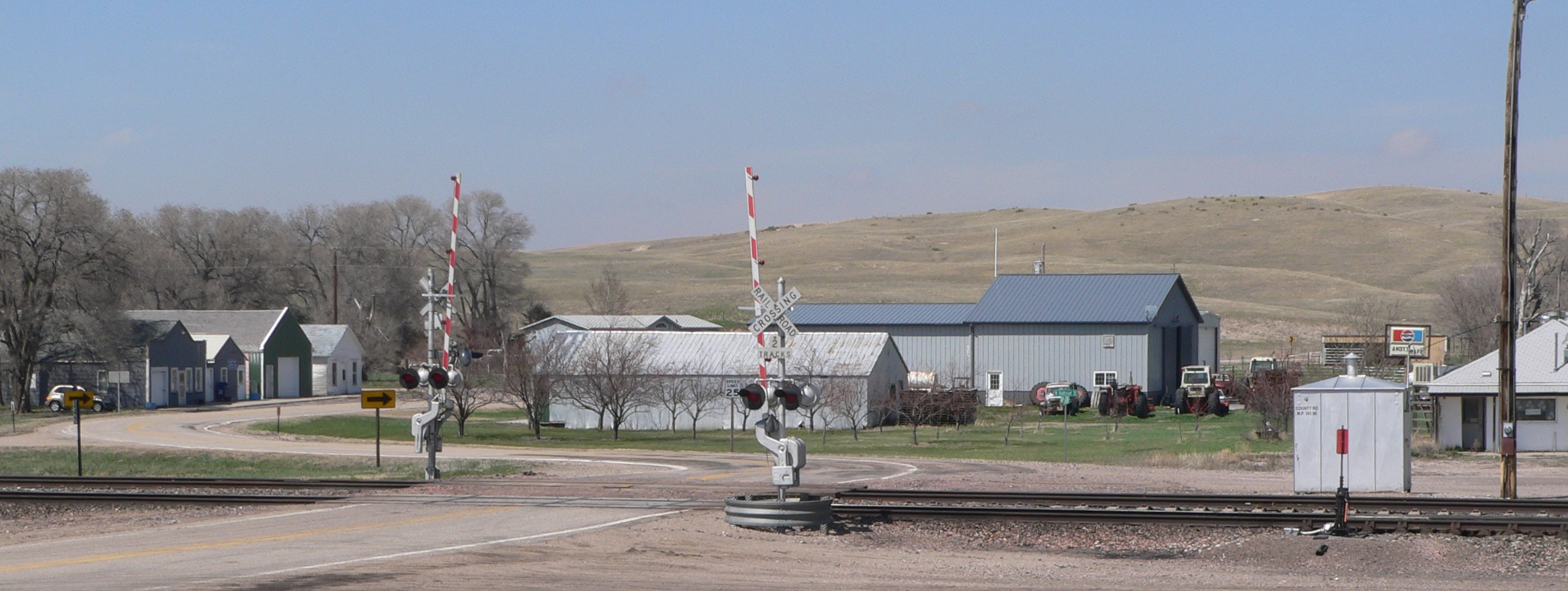
Northwest at the N-250 level crossing over the BNSF Railway railroad tracks in Lakeside, April 2011

N-250 begins at a T intersection with N-2 on the southern edge of the unincorporated community of Lakeside. (N-2 heads east toward Ellsworth and Broken Bow and west toward Antioch and Alliance.) From it southern terminus N-250 heads north to promptly cross over two sets of BNSF Railway railroad tracks at a level crossing. Immediately thereafter N-250 jogs to the west before quickly passing north through the small community. On the northside of Lakeside, N-250 curves to head east–northeast to run along the northern shore of a small, unnamed lake.

One mile (1.6 km) from its southern terminus N-250 curves to head northerly through rolling sand hills and passing by multiple small lakes and ponds (nearly all of which are unnamed). Roughly 2 miles (3.2 km) after turning northerly (and east–northeast of Thompson Lake) N-250 connects with the west end of 304th Trail, a road that connects to other lakes. Just over 15 miles (24 km) farther north, N-250 connects with the east end of 298th Trail, which provides access to Twin Lakes and Diamond Lake. Just under 4 miles (6.4 km) more to the north (and east of Cravath Lake) N-250 connects with the west end of 358th Trail, which heads east to end at Nebraska Highway 27 (Mari Sandoz Sandhills Trail). About 4.2 miles (6.8 km) later, N-250 passes by the eastern edge of Smith Lake and the Smith Lake State Wildlife Management Area. After approximately 11.5 miles (18.5 km) more along its northerly course, and crossing over Pine Creek twice, N-250 crosses over the Niobrara River.

Two miles (3.2 km) north of the Niobrara River, N-250 straightens out and travels north for about another 8.3 miles (13.4 km) before reaching the city limits of Rushville, having crossed Rush Creek along the way. Upon entering Ruchville, N-250 heads north as Chamberlain Street for six blocks before reaching its northern terminus with US 20 (Bridges to Buttes Byway/East Second Street) at an intersection in the downtown area. (US 20 heads east from the intersection toward Clinton, Gordon, and Valentine. US 20 heads west to quickly run concurrent with Nebraska Highway 87 [which heads north to Pine Ridge in South Dakota] and then on to Hay Springs and Chadron.)

== Traffic ==
In 2012, the Nebraska Department of Roads (now known as the Nebraska Department of Transportation [NDOT]) calculated as many as 305 vehicles traveling on N-250 near Rushville, and as few as 90 vehicles traveling north of Lakeside. This is expressed in terms of annual average daily traffic (AADT), a measure of traffic volume for any average day of the year.

== History ==
Between 1940 and 1948 a metal-surfaced road (a particular type of gravel road) was constructed south from US 20 in Rushville to north of the Niobrara River. By 1953 it was extended farther south to north of Cravath Lake. The road was removed from the highway system map in 1957, and was re-added in 1960, as N-250. A narrow road was extended south from N-250 to N-2 in Lakeside around 1981–82, but it was not part of N-250 until 1996. The routing has not changed significantly since.

== Major intersections ==
The entire route is in Sheridan County.

Location	mi	km	Destinations	Notes
Lakeside	0.00	0.00	N-2 east – Ellsworth, Broken Bow N-2 west – Antioch, Alliance	Southern terminus;T intersection
	37.74	60.74	Bridge over the Niobrara River	
Rushville	48.65	78.29	US 20 east (Bridges to Buttes Byway/East 2nd Street) – Clinton, Gordon, Valentine US 20 west (Bridges to Buttes Byway/East Second Street) – N-87, Hay Springs, Pine Ridge (South Dakota), Chadron	Northern terminus
Rushville	48.65	78.29	Chamberlain Avenue north	Continuation north from northern terminus
1.000 mi = 1.609 km; 1.000 km = 0.621 mi

== See also ==
- List of state highways in Nebraska
