= Loosveldt Bridge =

- U.S. National Register of Historic Places
- Location within Nebraska Location within the United States
- Location: Private ranch road over the Niobrara River, 9.1 miles southeast of Rushville
- Nearest city: Rushville, Nebraska
- Coordinates: 42°34′53″N 102°23′2″W
- Area: less than one acre
- Built: 1888
- Architect: King Iron Bridge & Manufacturing Co.; King, George E., Bridge Co.
- Architectural style: Baltimore through truss
- MPS: Highway Bridges in Nebraska MPS
- NRHP reference No.: 92000730
- Added to NRHP: June 29, 1992

The Loosveldt Bridge is located bear Rushville, Nebraska, and is also known as the Budd Bridge, the Niobrara River Bridge, and NEHBS No. SH00-43.

== Construction History ==
It was built in 1888 by the King Iron Bridge & Manufacturing Co. and George E. King Bridge Co. It is a Baltimore through truss.

It was listed on the National Register of Historic Places in 1992.

Like the nearby Colclesser Bridge, it was built in 1933 from one of multiple spans of the Columbus Loup River Bridge (which was built in 1888 and had been disassembled and replaced early in 1933). It was used as a county road bridge until 1984, when it was sold to a private rancher.
