= Lakeside, Nebraska =

Unincorporated community in Sheridan County, Nebraska, United States

- Unincorporated community
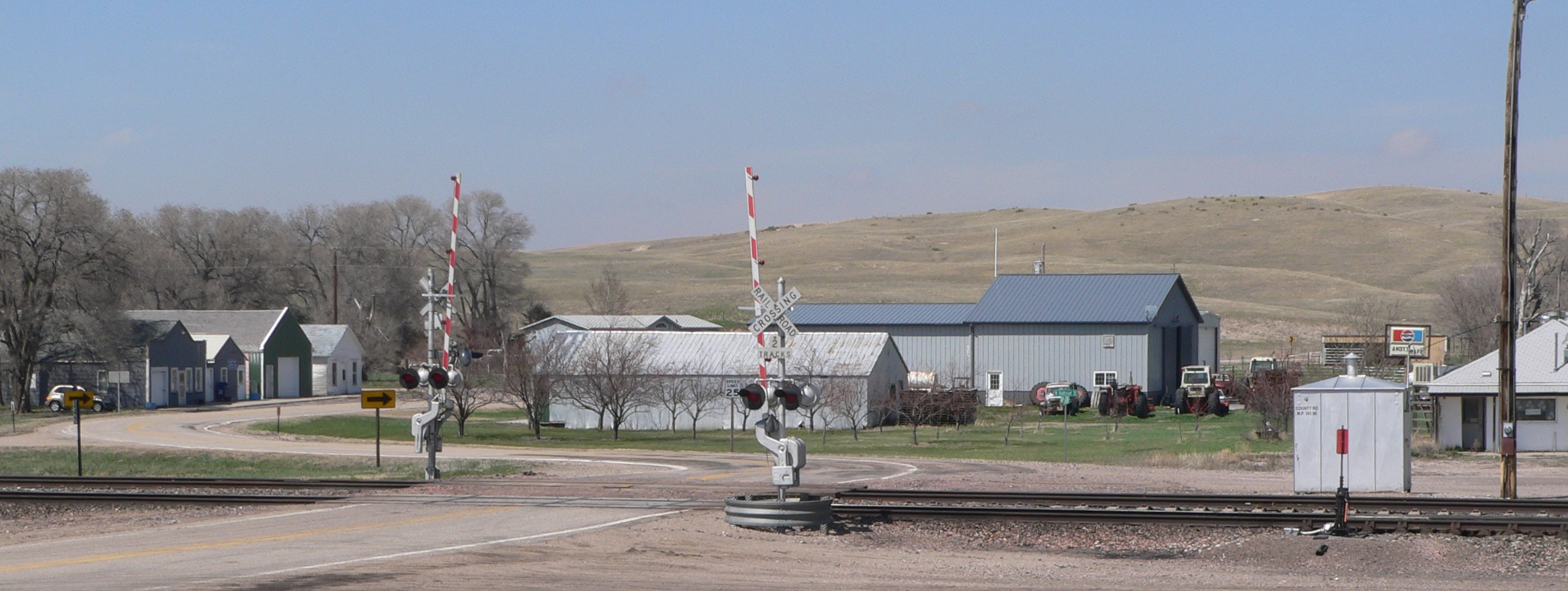
- Looking north from Nebraska Highway 2 at Nebraska Highway 250 at is crosses the BNSF tracks in Lakeside, April 2011

- Location within the state of Nebraska Location within the United States
- Coordinates: 42°3′21″N 102°25′30″W
- Country: United States
- State: Nebraska
- County: Sheridan
- Elevation: 3,881 ft (1,183 m)
- Time zone: UTC-6 (Central (CST))
  - Summer (DST): UTC-5 (CDT)
- ZIP codes: 69351
- GNIS feature ID: 830598

Lakeside is an unincorporated community in southern Sheridan County, Nebraska, United States. It lies along Nebraska Highway 2 and Nebraska Highway 250, south of the city of Rushville, the county seat of Sheridan County, at an elevation of 3,881 feet (1,183 m). Lakeside has a post office, with ZIP code 69351.

== History ==
Early settlers were John B. and Caroline Talbot Merrill, of Michigan and Norton, Suffolk, England respectively, circa 1890. Other early residents were the Nelson family, Danish immigrants. Daughters Lulu and Clara Nelson. P. McFadden 2018 The Lakeside post office was established in 1888. The community was named from the lake nearby.
