= South Dakota Highway 407 =

State highway in South Dakota, United States

Highway 407

Route information
- Maintained by SDDOT
- Length: 1.786 mi (2.874 km)
- Existed: 1975–present

Major junctions
- South end: N-87 south of Pine Ridge
- North end: US 18/BIA Rd. 32 in Pine Ridge

Location
- Country: United States
- State: South Dakota
- Counties: Oglala Lakota (Note: Prior to 2015, Oglala Lakota County was known as Shannon County.)

Highway system
- South Dakota State Trunk Highway System; Interstate; US; State
← SD 391	→ SD 437

South Dakota Highway 407 (SD 407) is a 1.786-mile (2.874 km) state highway on the southern edge of Oglala Lakota County, South Dakota, United States. Along with Nebraska Highway 87 (N-87), SD 407 serves as a connector route between U.S. Route 20 (US 20) in Rushville, Nebraska and U.S. Route 18 (US 18) in Pine Ridge.

== Route description ==
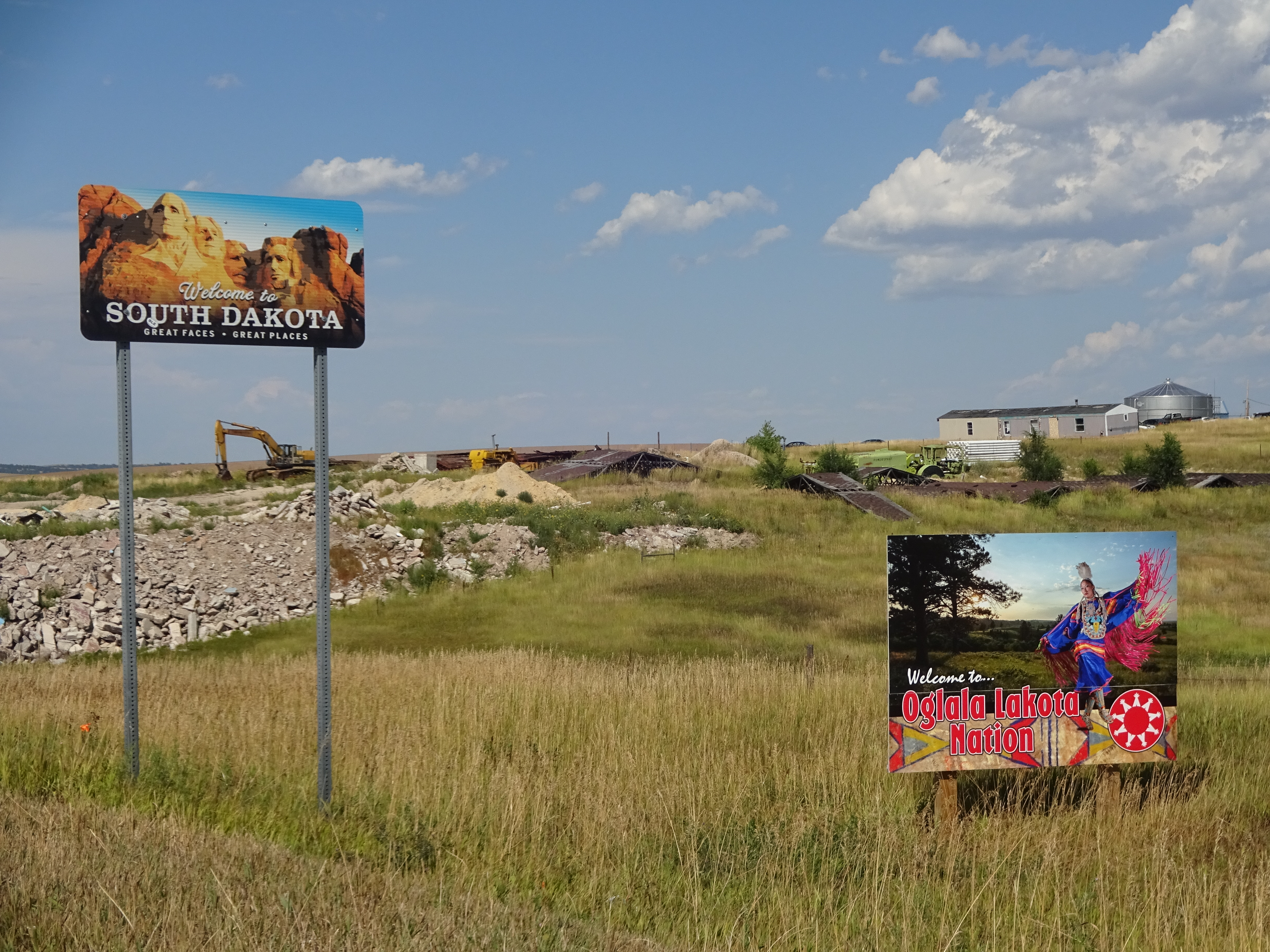
Welcome to South Dakota and Oglala Lakota Nation signs along SD 407, August 2017

SD 407 begins at the northern terminus of N-87 (at 790 Road) on the Nebraska–South Dakota border, south of the community of Pine Ridge (a census-designated place [CDP]), and is entirely within the Pine Ridge Indian Reservation. (N-87 continues southerly in Nebraska, through the CDP of White Clay, and on toward its southern terminus at US 20 in Rushville.)

From its southern terminus SD 407 heads north along the eastern edge of, and then into, Pine Ridge. A few blocks after entering the main part of the community SD 407 reaches its northern terminus at an intersection with US 18 and BIA Route 32 (BIA Rd. 32). From the northern terminus of SD 407, US 18 heads easterly to Martin and Mission and northerly to Oglala and Hot Springs. BIA Rd. 32 heads westerly to terminate at BIA Route 41. On average, SD 407 is driven by over 4,200 vehicles per day.

== Major intersections ==
The entire route is in Oglala Lakota County.

Location	mi	km	Destinations	Notes
White Clay	0.000	0.000	N-87 south – Rushville, US 20	Continuation south into Nebraska from southern terminus
	0.000	0.000	N-87 / 790 Road at Nebraska state line	Southern terminus of SD 407
Pine Ridge	1.786	2.874	US 18 / BIA Rd. 32 (Main Street) – Martin, Mission	Northern terminus of SD 407; eastern terminus of BIA Rd. 32
Pine Ridge	1.786	2.874	US 18 north – Oglala, Hot Springs	Continuation north beyond northern terminus
1.000 mi = 1.609 km; 1.000 km = 0.621 mi

== See also ==
- List of state highways in South Dakota
