= Sheridan County Courthouse =

Sheridan County Courthouse may refer to:

- Sheridan County Courthouse (Kansas), Hoxie, Kansas
- Sheridan County Courthouse (Nebraska), Rushville, Nebraska
- Sheridan County Courthouse (North Dakota), McClusky, North Dakota
- Sheridan County Courthouse (Wyoming), Sheridan, Wyoming
