= District No. 119 North School =

- U.S. National Register of Historic Places
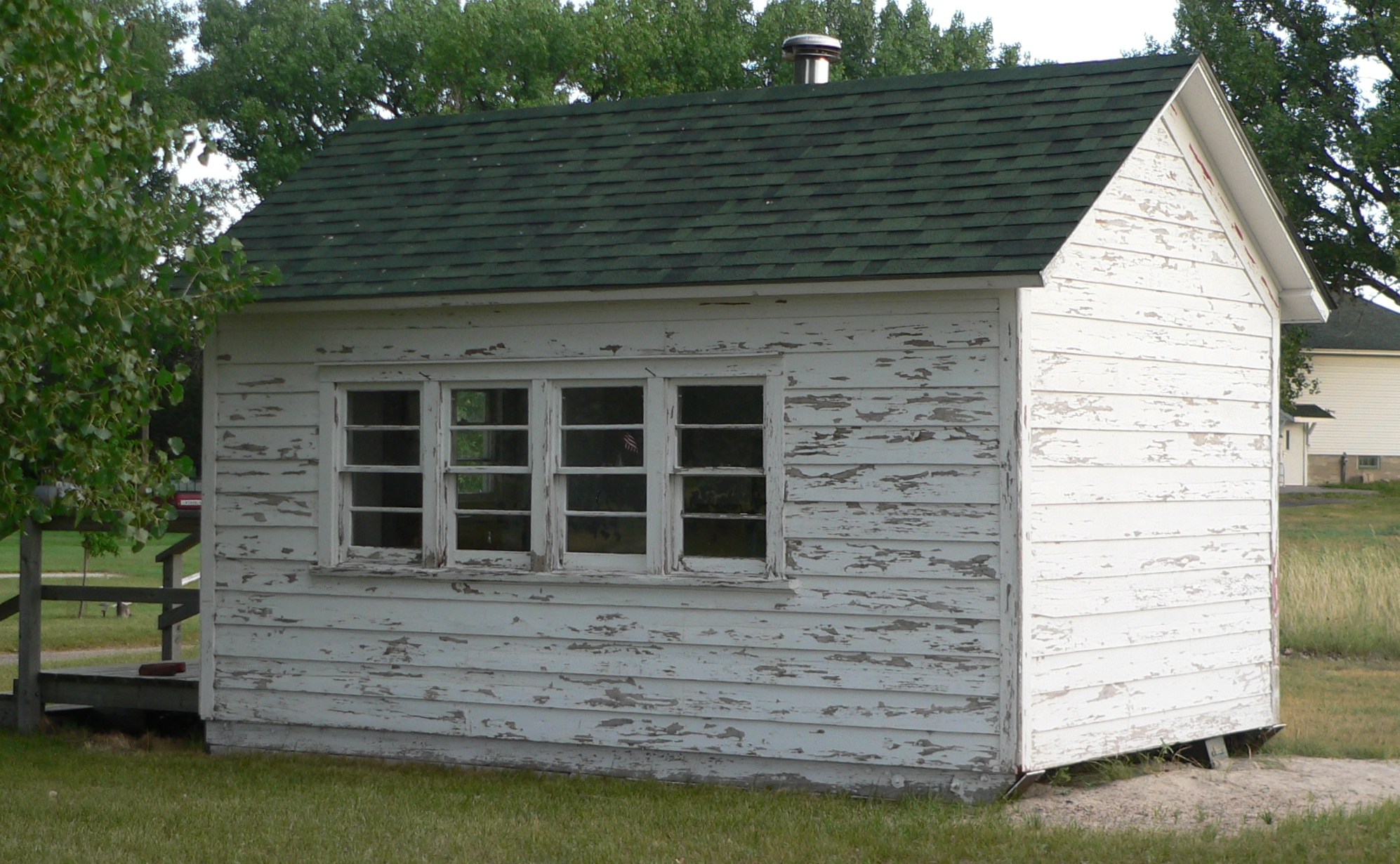
- District No. 119 North School in 2011.

- Location within Nebraska Location within the United States
- Location: South side of Sandy Ave., Ellsworth, Nebraska
- Coordinates: 42°03′29″N 102°16′38″W
- Area: less than one acre
- Built: 1951
- Architect: Torville Erickson
- NRHP reference No.: 10000606
- Added to NRHP: August 30, 2010

The District No. 119 North School is a moveable historic school in Sheridan County, Nebraska, United States that was built in 1951 and served as a school for 10 years. It is a 10-by-16-foot (3.0 m × 4.9 m) building with no foundation, rather resting on skids so that it could be moved to where it was needed. It was moved to the areas of school-children of ranches too remote for the children come to the school in Ellsworth. It is now located in Ellsworth.

It was listed on the National Register of Historic Places in 2010. It was deemed significant as a one-room schoolhouse preserved with good historic integrity.
