= Gourley's Opera House =

- Gourleys Opera House
- U.S. National Register of Historic Places
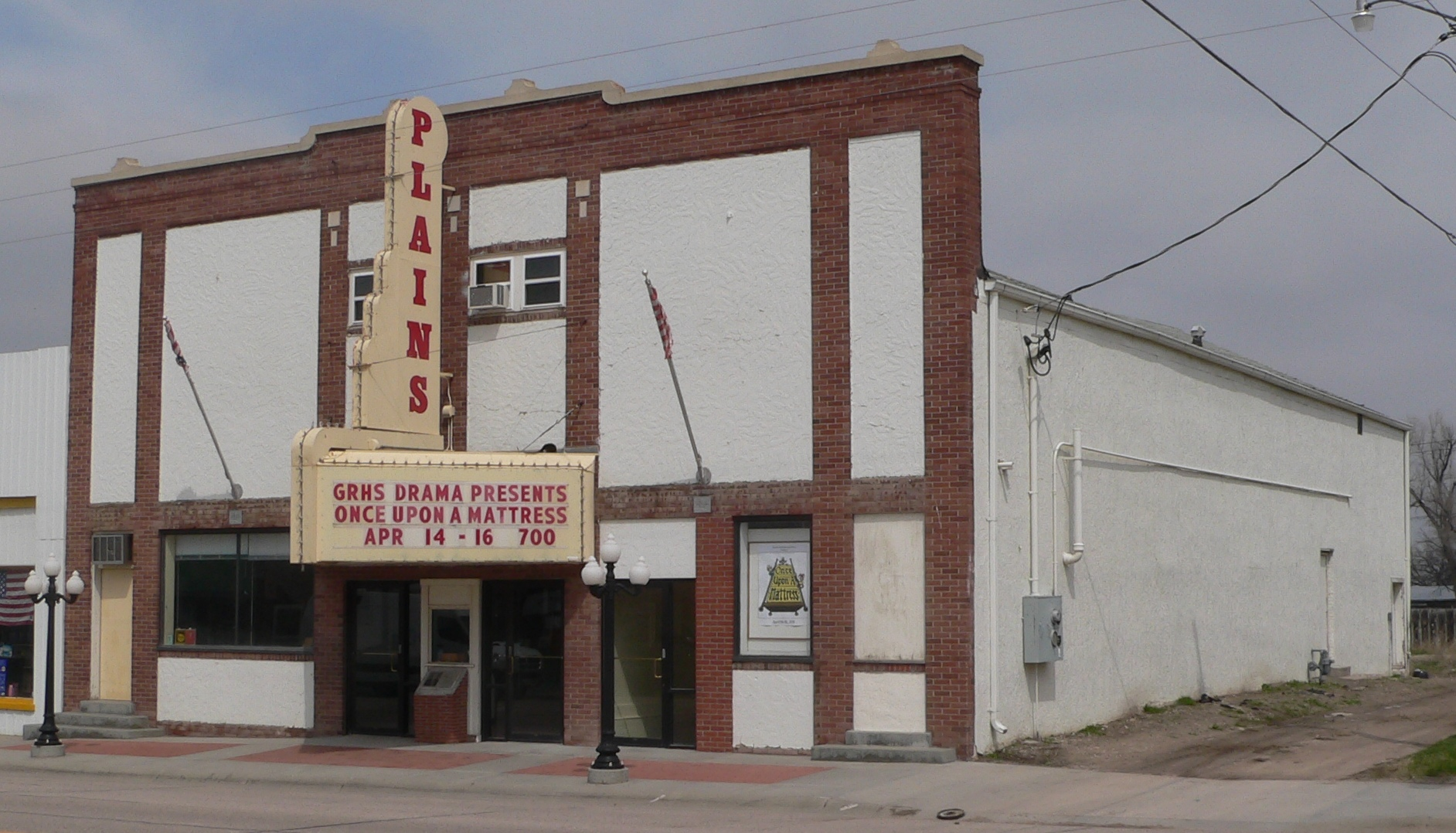

- Location within Nebraska Location within the United States
- Location: Second St., Rushville, Nebraska
- Coordinates: 42°43′6″N 102°27′41″W
- Area: less than one acre
- Built: 1914
- Architectural style: One-part commercial block
- MPS: Opera House Buildings in Nebraska 1867-1917 MPS
- NRHP reference No.: 88000943
- Added to NRHP: July 6, 2005

The Gourley's Opera House, on Second St. in Rushville, Nebraska, was built in 1914. It is a "one-part commercial block" building, and has been known as Star Theatre, as S & S Theatre, and as Plains Theatre.

It is approximately 50 by 80 feet (15 m × 24 m) and has a false front and a tin roof. It was built by Dave Gourley, who brought electricity to Rushville. The building was one of the first in Rushville to have electricity and was used as an entertainment venue.

It was listed on the National Register of Historic Places in 1988.
