= Nebraska Highway 87 =

State highway in Nebraska, U.S.

State Highway 87

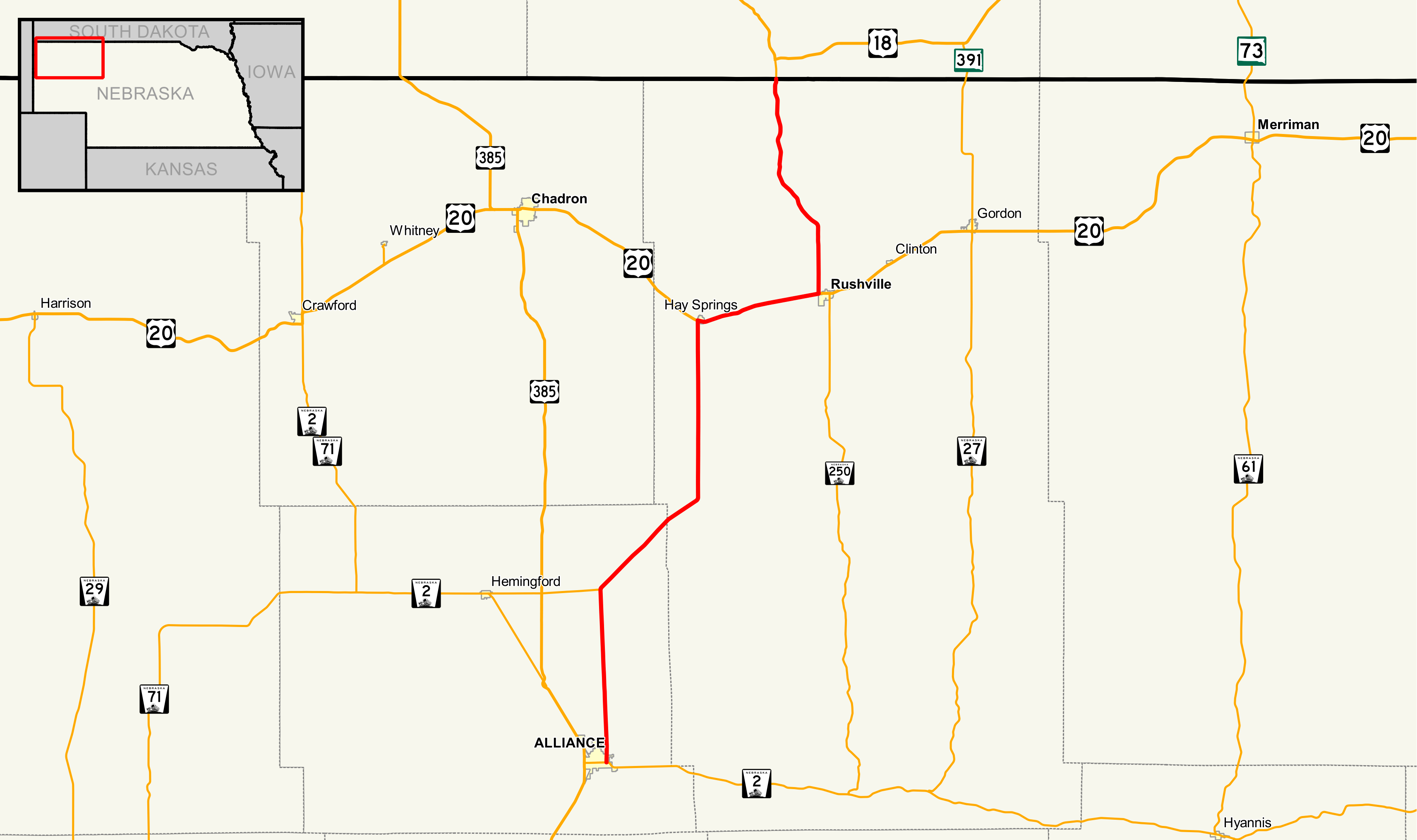
- Nebraska Highway 87 highlighted in red

Route information
- Maintained by NDOT
- Length: 76.76 mi (123.53 km)
- Existed: 1935–present

Major junctions
- South end: N-2 in Alliance
- US 20 in Hay Springs
- North end: SD 407 north of Whiteclay

Location
- Country: United States
- State: Nebraska
- Counties: Box Butte, Sheridan

Highway system
- Nebraska State Highway System; Interstate; US; State; Link; Spur; State Spurs; Recreation
← N-85	→ N-88

Nebraska Highway 87 is a highway in northwestern Nebraska. It has a southern terminus at Nebraska Highway 2 in Alliance. Its northern terminus is at the South Dakota border where it continues in northward as South Dakota Highway 407.

== Route description ==
Nebraska Highway 87 begins at an intersection with NE 2 in Alliance. It heads in a northerly direction before turning to the northeast through farmland. It turns northward again before heading into Hay Springs. At this point, NE 87 runs concurrently eastward with US 20 for about 11 miles (18 km). Just outside Rushville, US 20 and NE 87 split and NE 87 heads northward. It turns to the northwest slightly before heading directly northward into Whiteclay. It then terminates at the border with South Dakota, where it continues as SD 407.

== Major intersections ==
County	Location	mi	km	Destinations	Notes
Box Butte	Alliance	0.00	0.00	N-2 (East 3rd Street)	
Box Butte		15.86	25.52	L-7E west (Dodge Road)	
Sheridan	Hay Springs	44.37	71.41	US 20 west	South end of US 20 overlap
Sheridan	Rushville	55.76	89.74	US 20 east	North end of US 20 overlap
Sheridan	Whiteclay	76.76	123.53	SD 407 north (White Clay Road)	Continuation into South Dakota
1.000 mi = 1.609 km; 1.000 km = 0.621 mi: Concurrency terminus
