= Lee and Gottliebe Fritz House =

Historic house in Nebraska, United States

- U.S. National Register of Historic Places
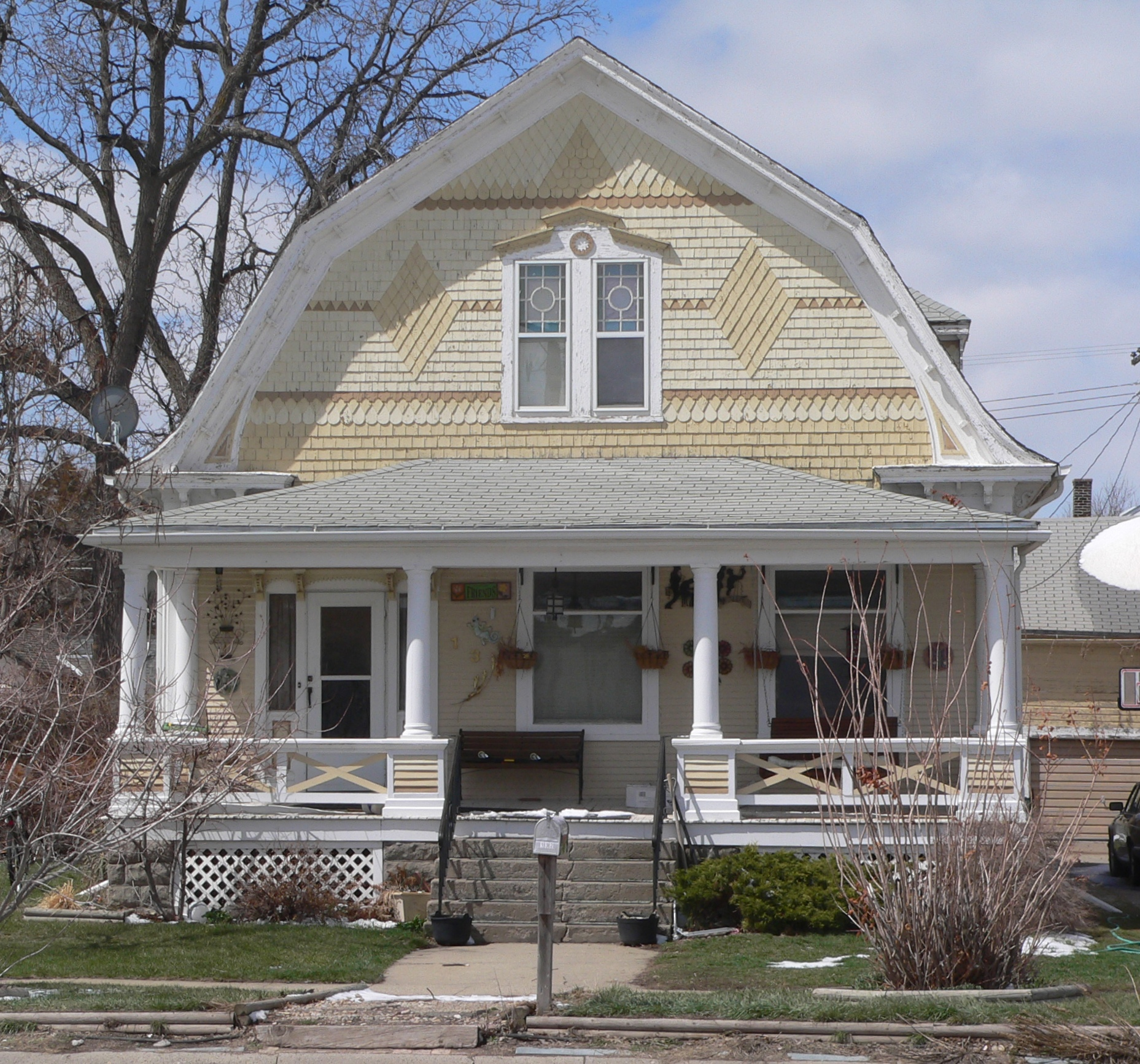

- Location within Nebraska Location within the United States
- Location: 132 North Oak, Gordon, Nebraska
- Coordinates: 42°48′15″N 102°12′16″W
- Area: less than one acre
- Built: 1909
- Built by: Tuchenhagen, Karl; Conklin, Glenn
- Architectural style: Dutch Colonial Revival
- NRHP reference No.: 03001213
- Added to NRHP: November 28, 2003

The Lee and Gottliebe Fritz House, located at 132 North Oak in Gordon, Nebraska, is a historic house that was built in 1909. It was listed on the National Register of Historic Places (NRHP) in 2003. The listing included a garage, older than the house itself, as another contributing building.

In its NRHP nomination, it was deemed significant as "a distinctive example of a significant type of construction in Gordon, Nebraska, namely ... a Dutch Colonial Revival residence." It was noted that Dutch Colonial Revival is "extremely rare...in this part of Nebraska." In fact it is apparently the only example in Sheridan County. And also it was also deemed significant for association with Lee Fritz, "a leading Sheridan County citizen".
