= Sheridan County, Nebraska =

County in Nebraska, United States

- County
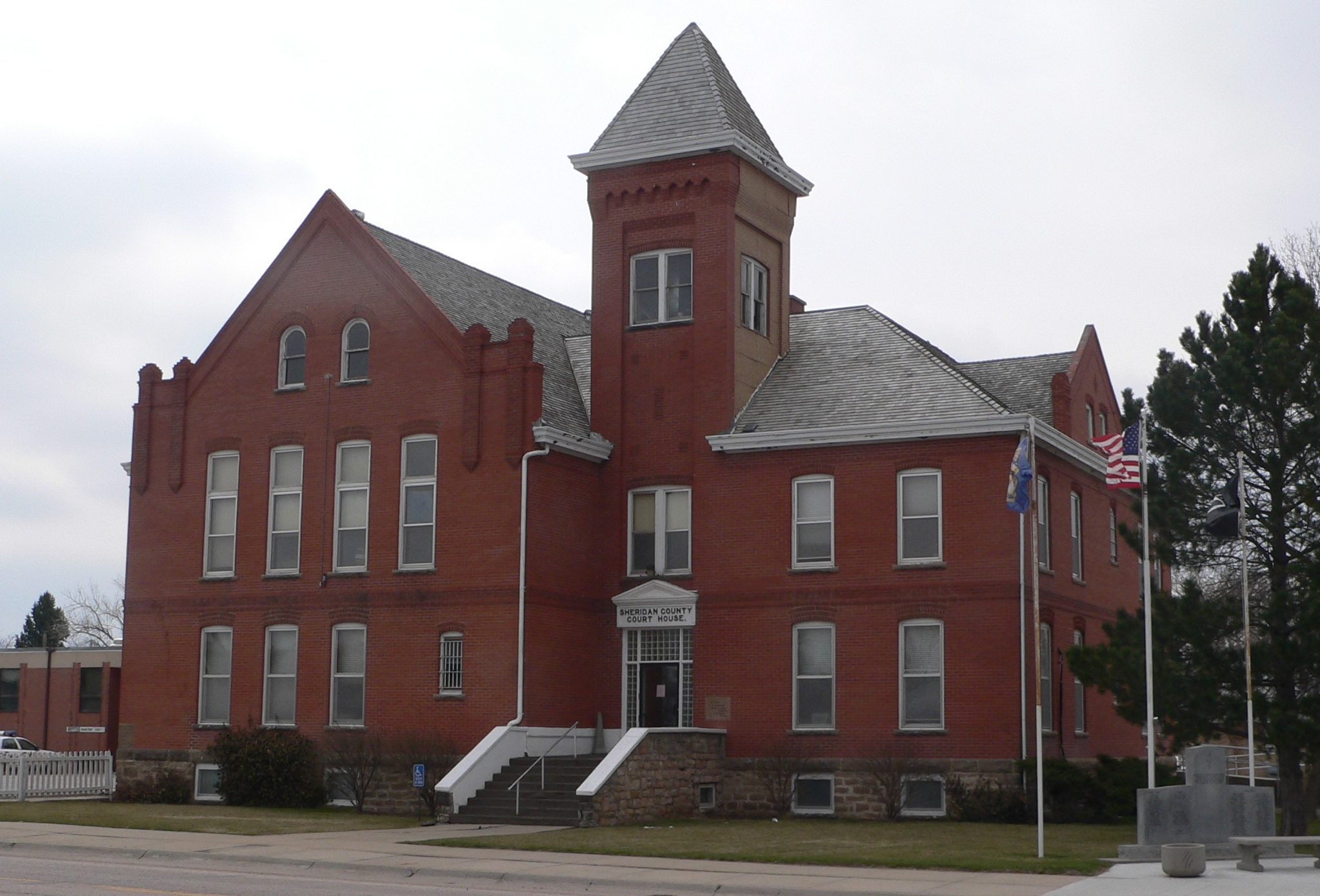
- The Sheridan County Courthouse in Rushville

- Location within the U.S. state of Nebraska
- Coordinates: 42.512289°N 102.36828°W
- Country: United States
- State: Nebraska
- Founded: February 25, 1885
- Named for: Philip Sheridan
- Seat: Rushville
- Largest city: Gordon

Area
  - Total: 2,469.736 sq mi (6,396.59 km^{2})
  - Land: 2,440.170 sq mi (6,320.01 km^{2})
  - Water: 29.566 sq mi (76.58 km^{2}) 1.20%

Population (2020)
  - Total: 5,127
  - Estimate (2025): 4,809 ▼
  - Density: 2.101/sq mi (0.8112/km^{2})
- Time zone: UTC−7 (Mountain)
  - Summer (DST): UTC−6 (MDT)
- Area code: 308
- Congressional district: 3rd
- Website: sheridancounty.ne.gov
- • Nebraska county number 81 • Nebraska license plate prefix 61

Sheridan County is a county in the U.S. state of Nebraska. As of the 2020 census, the population was 5,127, and was estimated to be 4,809 in 2025. The county seat is Rushville and the largest city is Gordon.

In the Nebraska license plate system, Sheridan County was represented by the prefix "61" (as it had the 61st-largest number of vehicles registered in the state when the license plate system was established in 1922).

== History ==
Sheridan County was created on February 25, 1885, and was named for General Philip H. Sheridan.

== Geography ==
According to the United States Census Bureau, the county has a total area of 2,469.736 square miles (6,396.59 km^{2}), of which 2,440.170 square miles (6,320.01 km^{2}) is land and 29.566 square miles (76.58 km^{2}) (1.20%) is water. It is the 4th-largest county in Nebraska by total area.

Sheridan County lies on the north line of Nebraska. Its north boundary line abuts the south boundary line of the state of South Dakota. An upper reach of the Niobrara River flows eastward through the upper central part of the county. The terrain consists of arid rolling hills, dotted with small lakes in the eastern and southern parts of the county.

=== Major highways ===
- US 20
- Nebraska Highway 2
- Nebraska Highway 27
- Nebraska Highway 87
- Nebraska Highway 250

=== Adjacent counties ===
- Oglala Lakota County, South Dakota - north
- Cherry County - east
- Grant County - southeast
- Garden County - south
- Morrill County - southwest
- Dawes County - west
- Box Butte County - west

=== Protected areas ===
- Smith Lake State Wildlife Management Area
- Walgren Lake State Recreation Area

== Demographics ==
Historical population
| Census | Pop. | Note | %± |
|---|---|---|---|
| 1890 | 8,687 | | — |
| 1900 | 3,066 | | −64.7% |
| 1910 | 7,328 | | 139.0% |
| 1920 | 9,625 | | 31.3% |
| 1930 | 10,793 | | 12.1% |
| 1940 | 9,869 | | −8.6% |
| 1950 | 9,539 | | −3.3% |
| 1960 | 9,049 | | −5.1% |
| 1970 | 7,285 | | −19.5% |
| 1980 | 7,544 | | 3.6% |
| 1990 | 6,750 | | −10.5% |
| 2000 | 6,198 | | −8.2% |
| 2010 | 5,469 | | −11.8% |
| 2020 | 5,127 | | −6.3% |
| 2025 (est.) | 4,809 | ▼ | −6.2% |
U.S. Decennial Census; 1790–1960 1900–1990; 1990–2000 2010–2020

=== 2020 census ===
As of the 2020 census, the county had a population of 5,127. The median age was 46.7 years. 22.7% of residents were under the age of 18 and 26.8% of residents were 65 years of age or older. For every 100 females there were 99.0 males, and for every 100 females age 18 and over there were 95.6 males age 18 and over.

The racial makeup of the county was 80.8% White, 0.3% Black or African American, 11.0% American Indian and Alaska Native, 0.6% Asian, 0.0% Native Hawaiian and Pacific Islander, 1.7% from some other race, and 5.6% from two or more races. Hispanic or Latino residents of any race comprised 4.3% of the population.

0.0% of residents lived in urban areas, while 100.0% lived in rural areas.

There were 2,163 households in the county, of which 24.8% had children under the age of 18 living with them and 25.1% had a female householder with no spouse or partner present. About 32.5% of all households were made up of individuals and 17.8% had someone living alone who was 65 years of age or older.

There were 2,699 housing units, of which 19.9% were vacant. Among occupied housing units, 71.0% were owner-occupied and 29.0% were renter-occupied. The homeowner vacancy rate was 2.3% and the rental vacancy rate was 10.4%.

=== 2000 census ===
As of the 2000 census, there were 6,198 people, 2,549 households, and 1,728 families in the county. The population density was 2 people per square mile (0.77 people/km^{2}). There were 3,013 housing units at an average density of 1.2 units per square mile (0.46/km^{2}).

The racial makeup of the county was 88.11% White, 0.08% Black or African American, 9.23% Native American, 0.15% Asian, 0.02% Pacific Islander, 0.34% from other races, and 2.08% from two or more races. 1.47% of the population were Hispanic or Latino of any race. 31.6% were of German, 8.8% English, 7.8% Irish and 7.3% American ancestry.

There were 2,549 households, out of which 30.00% had children under the age of 18 living with them, 56.80% were married couples living together, 8.00% had a female householder with no husband present, and 32.20% were non-families. 29.60% of all households were made up of individuals, and 16.30% had someone living alone who was 65 years of age or older. The average household size was 2.38 and the average family size was 2.95.

The county population contained 25.60% under the age of 18, 6.20% from 18 to 24, 22.90% from 25 to 44, 23.60% from 45 to 64, and 21.70% who were 65 years of age or older. The median age was 42 years. For every 100 females there were 96.00 males. For every 100 females age 18 and over, there were 91.50 males.

The median income for a household in the county was $29,484, and the median income for a family was $35,167. Males had a median income of $21,892 versus $18,423 for females. The per capita income for the county was $14,844. About 11.00% of families and 13.20% of the population were below the poverty line, including 20.30% of those under age 18 and 7.50% of those age 65 or over.

== Communities ==
=== Cities ===
- Gordon
- Rushville (county seat)

=== Villages ===
- Clinton
- Hay Springs

=== Census-designated place ===
- Whiteclay

=== Unincorporated communities ===
- Bingham
- Ellsworth
- Hoffland
- Lakeside

=== Ghost town ===
- Antioch

=== 1910 Census-designated places ===
- Beaver
- Box Butte
- Clinton
- Extension
- Grant
- Hunter
- Kinkaid
- Milan
- Mill
- Minnetonka
- Mirage
- Niobrara
- Pine Creek
- Ranch
- Reno
- Running Water
- Schill
- Sharp
- Spring Lake
- Township 31 - Hay Springs Village
- Township 32 - Range 46
- Township 33 - Gordon Village
- Wolf Creek
- Wounded Knee

== Politics ==
Sheridan County voters have traditionally voted Republican; every national election since 1940 has seen Sheridan County choose the Republican Party presidential candidate. The county, alongside neighboring Garden County were the only two counties not to back Democratic Governor Ben Nelson in his 1994 landslide.

United States presidential election results for Sheridan County, Nebraska
| Year | Republican | | Democratic | | Third party(ies) | |
| Year | No. | % | No. | % | No. | % |
|---|---|---|---|---|---|---|
| 1900 | 626 | 45.59% | 703 | 51.20% | 44 | 3.20% |
| 1904 | 673 | 61.57% | 171 | 15.65% | 249 | 22.78% |
| 1908 | 709 | 46.68% | 733 | 48.26% | 77 | 5.07% |
| 1912 | 377 | 22.56% | 630 | 37.70% | 664 | 39.74% |
| 1916 | 604 | 32.35% | 1,158 | 62.02% | 105 | 5.62% |
| 1920 | 1,714 | 64.53% | 784 | 29.52% | 158 | 5.95% |
| 1924 | 1,509 | 41.46% | 661 | 18.16% | 1,470 | 40.38% |
| 1928 | 3,030 | 70.22% | 1,226 | 28.41% | 59 | 1.37% |
| 1932 | 1,820 | 37.41% | 2,945 | 60.53% | 100 | 2.06% |
| 1936 | 1,907 | 42.52% | 2,428 | 54.14% | 150 | 3.34% |
| 1940 | 3,161 | 66.87% | 1,566 | 33.13% | 0 | 0.00% |
| 1944 | 2,570 | 71.37% | 1,031 | 28.63% | 0 | 0.00% |
| 1948 | 2,180 | 64.86% | 1,181 | 35.14% | 0 | 0.00% |
| 1952 | 3,512 | 80.68% | 841 | 19.32% | 0 | 0.00% |
| 1956 | 2,618 | 74.57% | 893 | 25.43% | 0 | 0.00% |
| 1960 | 2,870 | 71.50% | 1,144 | 28.50% | 0 | 0.00% |
| 1964 | 2,440 | 67.85% | 1,156 | 32.15% | 0 | 0.00% |
| 1968 | 2,236 | 76.29% | 454 | 15.49% | 241 | 8.22% |
| 1972 | 2,386 | 83.22% | 481 | 16.78% | 0 | 0.00% |
| 1976 | 2,003 | 67.83% | 810 | 27.43% | 140 | 4.74% |
| 1980 | 2,749 | 84.04% | 370 | 11.31% | 152 | 4.65% |
| 1984 | 2,661 | 86.93% | 377 | 12.32% | 23 | 0.75% |
| 1988 | 2,251 | 77.67% | 612 | 21.12% | 35 | 1.21% |
| 1992 | 1,698 | 56.68% | 535 | 17.86% | 763 | 25.47% |
| 1996 | 1,834 | 67.50% | 573 | 21.09% | 310 | 11.41% |
| 2000 | 2,105 | 81.72% | 392 | 15.22% | 79 | 3.07% |
| 2004 | 2,136 | 82.19% | 430 | 16.54% | 33 | 1.27% |
| 2008 | 1,941 | 78.84% | 454 | 18.44% | 67 | 2.72% |
| 2012 | 2,021 | 81.76% | 390 | 15.78% | 61 | 2.47% |
| 2016 | 2,211 | 84.78% | 287 | 11.00% | 110 | 4.22% |
| 2020 | 2,292 | 85.39% | 340 | 12.67% | 52 | 1.94% |
| 2024 | 2,102 | 84.18% | 362 | 14.50% | 33 | 1.32% |

== See also ==
- National Register of Historic Places listings in Sheridan County, Nebraska
