= Colclesser Bridge =

- U.S. National Register of Historic Places
- Location within Nebraska Location within the United States
- Nearest city: Rushville, Nebraska
- Coordinates: 42°37′18″N 102°18′48″W
- Area: less than one acre
- Built: 1888
- Built by: King Iron Bridge & Manufacturing Co.; King, George E., Bridge Co.
- Architectural style: Baltimore through truss
- MPS: Highway Bridges in Nebraska MPS
- NRHP reference No.: 92000729
- Added to NRHP: June 29, 1992

The Colclesser Bridge, over the Niobrara River about 11 miles south of Rushville, Nebraska, is a bridge erected at its current location in 1933. Its span was one of four 248 foot spans in the Columbus Loup River Bridge, that was built in 1888, and that carried the Lincoln and Meridian Highways over the Loup River. It was replaced in 1933, and the span was stored apparently, Because flooding in August 1933 destroyed numerous bridges in Sheridan County, it was purchased and erected for cost of $6,211, less four panels so its current span is 166 feet.

It is a Baltimore through truss bridge that was built originally by the King Iron Bridge & Manufacturing Co. and the George E. King Bridge Co., both of Cleveland, Ohio. It has also been known as Rath Bridge and as Niobrara River Bridge, and it has been designated NEHBS No. SH00-42. It was listed on the National Register of Historic Places in 1992.
