= Clinton, Nebraska =

Village in Sheridan County, Nebraska, United States

- Village
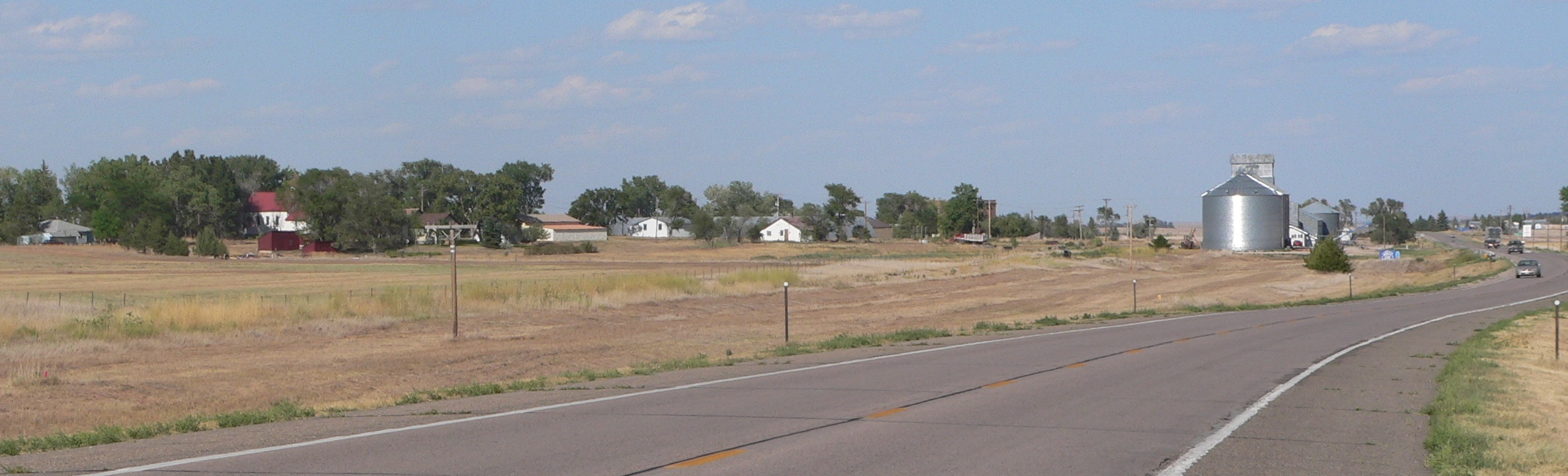
- Clinton, seen from the southwest along U.S. Route 20, August 2012

- Location of Clinton, Nebraska
- Coordinates: 42°45′35″N 102°20′52″W
- Country: United States
- State: Nebraska
- County: Sheridan

Area
  - Total: 0.093 sq mi (0.24 km^{2})
  - Land: 0.093 sq mi (0.24 km^{2})
  - Water: 0 sq mi (0.00 km^{2})
- Elevation: 3,744 ft (1,141 m)

Population (2020)
  - Total: 38
  - Density: 405/sq mi (156.5/km^{2})
- Time zone: UTC-7 (Mountain (MST))
  - Summer (DST): UTC-6 (MDT)
- ZIP code: 69343
- Area code: 308
- FIPS code: 31-09655
- GNIS feature ID: 2398583

Clinton is a village in Sheridan County, Nebraska, United States. The village was named for Clinton, Iowa. As of the 2020 census, Clinton had a population of 38.

== History ==
Clinton got its start in the 1880s when the Fremont, Elkhorn, & Missouri Valley Railroad was extended there, but the town was not incorporated as a village until 1920.

== Geography ==
According to the United States Census Bureau, the village has a total area of 0.09 square miles (0.23 km^{2}), all land.

== Demographics ==
Historical population
Census	Pop.	Note	%±
1930	157		—
1940	119		−24.2%
1950	36		−69.7%
1960	46		27.8%
1980	80		—
1990	33		−58.7%
2000	30		−9.1%
2010	41		36.7%
2020	38		−7.3%
U.S. Decennial Census

=== 2010 census ===
As of the census of 2010, there were 41 people, 19 households, and 13 families residing in the village. The population density was 455.6 inhabitants per square mile (175.9/km^{2}). There were 21 housing units at an average density of 233.3 per square mile (90.1/km^{2}). The racial makeup of the village was 75.6% White, 2.4% African American, 2.4% Native American, and 19.5% from two or more races. Hispanic or Latino of any race were 2.4% of the population.

There were 19 households, of which 15.8% had children under the age of 18 living with them, 68.4% were married couples living together, and 31.6% were non-families. 26.3% of all households were made up of individuals, and 21.1% had someone living alone who was 65 years of age or older. The average household size was 2.16 and the average family size was 2.62.

The median age in the village was 55.5 years. 14.6% of residents were under the age of 18; 2.3% were between the ages of 18 and 24; 17% were from 25 to 44; 21.9% were from 45 to 64; and 43.9% were 65 years of age or older. The gender makeup of the village was 53.7% male and 46.3% female.

=== 2000 census ===
As of the census of 2000, there were 30 people, 16 households, and 11 families residing in the village. The population density was 319.7 inhabitants per square mile (123.4/km^{2}). There were 17 housing units at an average density of 181.1 per square mile (69.9/km^{2}). The racial makeup of the village was 96.67% White, and 3.33% from two or more races.

There were 16 households, out of which 6.3% had children under the age of 18 living with them, 56.3% were married couples living together, 12.5% had a female householder with no husband present, and 31.3% were non-families. 31.3% of all households were made up of individuals, and 12.5% had someone living alone who was 65 years of age or older. The average household size was 1.88 and the average family size was 2.27.

In the village, the population was spread out, with 6.7% under the age of 18, 3.3% from 18 to 24, 26.7% from 25 to 44, 26.7% from 45 to 64, and 36.7% who were 65 years of age or older. The median age was 56 years. For every 100 females, there were 100.0 males. For every 100 females age 18 and over, there were 100.0 males.

As of 2000 the median income for a household in the village was $40,000, and the median income for a family was $41,250. Males had a median income of $26,250 versus $22,500 for females. The per capita income for the village was $22,977. None of the population and none of the families were below the poverty line.

== See also ==
- List of municipalities in Nebraska
