= Sheridan County Courthouse (Nebraska) =

- U.S. National Register of Historic Places
- U.S. Historic district
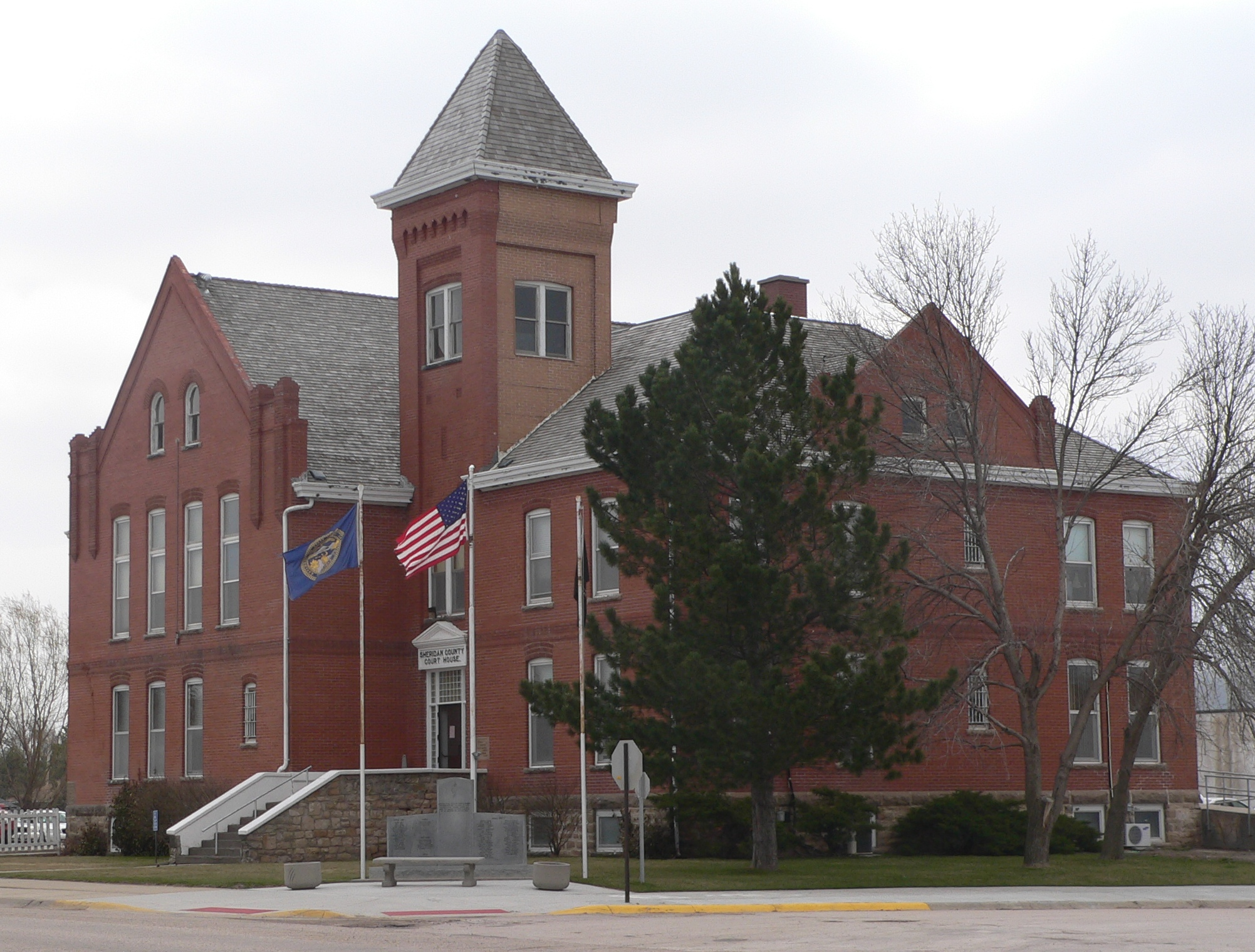
- Photographed in 2011

- Location within Nebraska Location within the United States
- Location: 2nd and Sprague Sts., Rushville, Nebraska
- Coordinates: 42°43′4″N 102°27′36″W
- Area: less than one acre
- Built: 1904
- Architect: Misner, W.T.
- Architectural style: Romanesque
- MPS: County Courthouses of Nebraska MPS
- NRHP reference No.: 89002216
- Added to NRHP: January 10, 1990

The Sheridan County Courthouse, located at 2nd and Sprague Sts. in Rushville, Nebraska, was built in 1904. It was listed on the National Register of Historic Places in 1990. It has also been designated Nebraska historic site SH08-1.

It is an example of the "County Capitol" architecture type, and, along with the Cherry County Courthouse, is one of the "less intricate" examples of the type, having a single squared tower, rather than having a dome and several towers.
