= Hay Springs, Nebraska =

- City
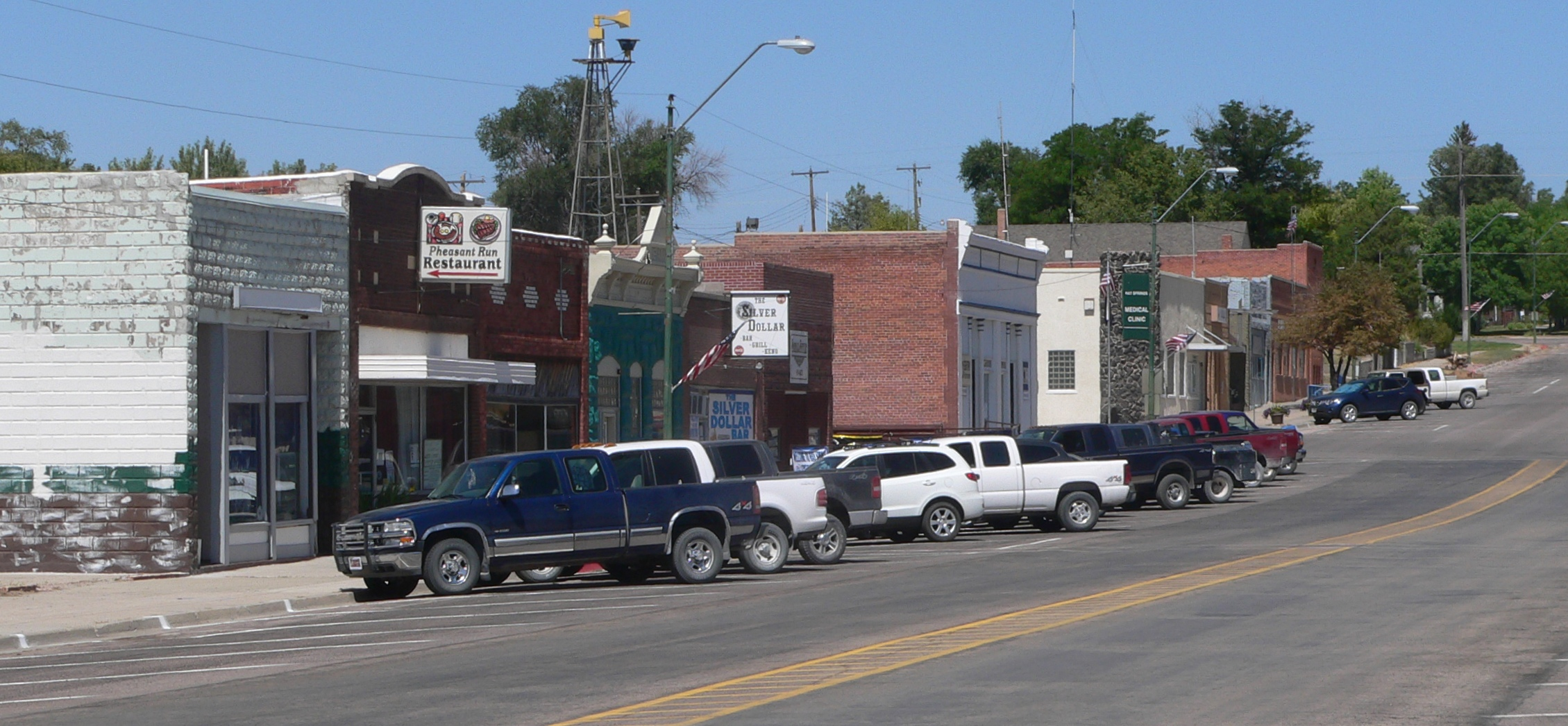
- Downtown Hay Springs, 2012

- Location of Hay Springs, Nebraska
- Coordinates: 42°41′00″N 102°41′23″W
- Country: United States
- State: Nebraska
- County: Sheridan

Area
  - Total: 0.37 sq mi (0.97 km^{2})
  - Land: 0.37 sq mi (0.97 km^{2})
  - Water: 0 sq mi (0.00 km^{2})
- Elevation: 3,832 ft (1,168 m)

Population (2020)
  - Total: 599
  - Density: 1,591.9/sq mi (614.62/km^{2})
- Time zone: UTC-7 (Mountain (MST))
  - Summer (DST): UTC-6 (MDT)
- ZIP code: 69347
- Area code: 308
- FIPS code: 31-21730
- GNIS feature ID: 2398268

Hay Springs Library, 2007

Hay Springs is a city in Sheridan County in the state of Nebraska, in the Great Plains region of the United States. The population was 570 at the 2010 census.

== History ==
Hay Springs was established in 1885 when the railroad was extended to that point. It was named from the production of hay in the valley east of the springs. Hay Springs was incorporated as a village in November 1885.

== Geography ==
According to the United States Census Bureau, the city has a total area of 0.38 square miles (0.98 km^{2}), all land.

== Demographics ==
Historical population
Census	Pop.	Note	%±
1890	378		—
1900	345		−8.7%
1910	408		18.3%
1920	577		41.4%
1930	853		47.8%
1940	819		−4.0%
1950	1,091		33.2%
1960	823		−24.6%
1970	682		−17.1%
1980	794		16.4%
1990	693		−12.7%
2000	652		−5.9%
2010	570		−12.6%
2020	599		5.1%
U.S. Decennial Census

=== 2010 census ===
As of the census of 2010, there were 570 people, 266 households, and 130 families residing in the city. The population density was 1,500.0 inhabitants per square mile (579.2/km^{2}). There were 328 housing units at an average density of 863.2 per square mile (333.3/km^{2}). The racial makeup of the city was 92.8% White, 5.4% Native American, and 1.8% from two or more races. Hispanic or Latino of any race were 1.8% of the population.

There were 266 households, of which 18.4% had children under the age of 18 living with them, 40.2% were married couples living together, 5.6% had a female householder with no husband present, 3.0% had a male householder with no wife present, and 51.1% were non-families. 46.6% of all households were made up of individuals, and 26.3% had someone living alone who was 65 years of age or older. The average household size was 1.91 and the average family size was 2.72.

The median age in the city was 54.6 years. 16.3% of residents were under the age of 18; 3.4% were between the ages of 18 and 24; 17.6% were from 25 to 44; 27.2% were from 45 to 64; and 35.4% were 65 years of age or older. The gender makeup of the city was 46.3% male and 53.7% female.

=== 2000 census ===
As of the census of 2000, there were 652 people, 283 households, and 181 families residing in the city. The population density was 1,715.2 inhabitants per square mile (662.2/km^{2}). There were 334 housing units at an average density of 878.6 per square mile (339.2/km^{2}). The racial makeup of the city was 90.18% White, 5.67% Native American, 1.53% from other races, and 2.61% from two or more races. Hispanic or Latino of any race were 2.30% of the population.

There were 283 households, out of which 25.4% had children under the age of 18 living with them, 53.0% were married couples living together, 7.4% had a female householder with no husband present, and 35.7% were non-families. 31.8% of all households were made up of individuals, and 18.7% had someone living alone who was 65 years of age or older. The average household size was 2.29 and the average family size was 2.90.

In the city, the population was spread out, with 22.4% under the age of 18, 8.7% from 18 to 24, 21.5% from 25 to 44, 24.7% from 45 to 64, and 22.7% who were 65 years of age or older. The median age was 44 years. For every 100 females, there were 90.6 males. For every 100 females age 18 and over, there were 82.7 males.

As of 2000 the median income for a household in the city was $30,078, and the median income for a family was $34,318. Males had a median income of $30,000 versus $21,136 for females. The per capita income for the city was $14,376. About 10.3% of families and 12.5% of the population were below the poverty line, including 16.8% of those under age 18 and 8.9% of those age 65 or over.

== Transportation ==
Hay Springs is located at the junction of U.S. Route 20 and Nebraska Highway 87.

== Education ==
Hay Springs has an elementary school, a middle school, and a high school. The school’s mascot is the Hawks.

== Notable people ==
- Mari Sandoz - Author and Nebraska Hall of Fame inductee born nearby.
- S. Donald Stookey - Inventor, family moved to Iowa when he was six.
