= Antioch, Nebraska =

Ghost town in Sheridan County, Nebraska, United States

- Ghost town
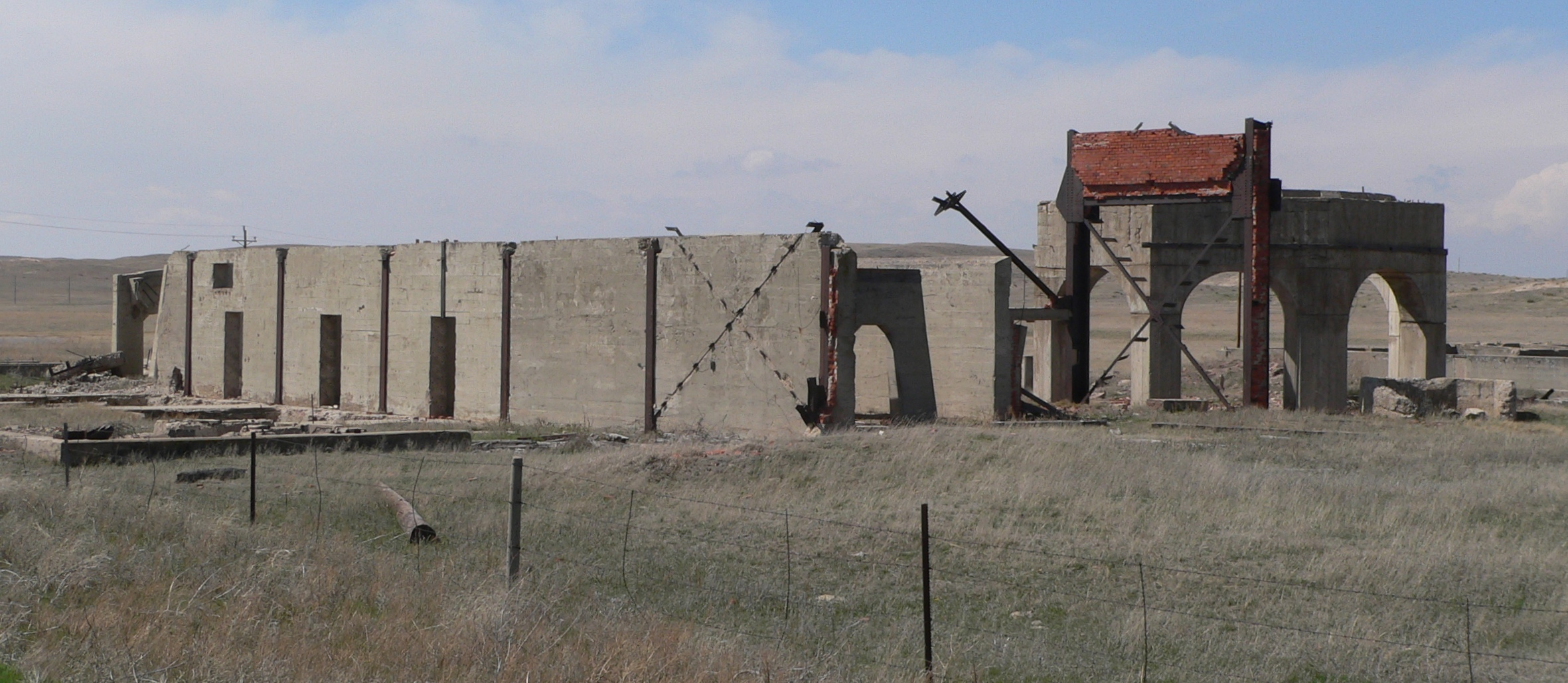
- Ruins of potash plant near Antioch, April 2011

- Location within the state of Nebraska Location within the United States
- Coordinates: 42°04′06″N 102°34′56″W
- Country: United States
- State: Nebraska
- County: Sheridan
- Elevation: 3,881 ft (1,183 m)
- Time zone: UTC-6 ([MST])
  - Summer (DST): MST
- Area code: 308
- GNIS feature ID: 834979

Antioch is a ghost town in Sheridan County, Nebraska, United States. Located approximately 15 miles (24 km) east of Alliance on Nebraska Highway 2, the town was once nicknamed "the potash capital of Nebraska." The town took its name from Antioch, Ohio.

== History ==
Antioch is located in the sparsely populated Sandhills region of western Nebraska. According to one historian, the year before the United States became involved in World War I, the town only had one schoolhouse, a church, and a store.

In 1917, scientists at the University of Nebraska introduced a method of distilling potash from the water of alkaline lakes which dotted the Sandhills. Potash had been primarily imported from Germany prior to World War I. German potash had sold for around $8 to $10 per ton, but scarcity during the war drove the price of potash to $150 a ton.

Antioch's proximity to several major alkaline lakes made it the logical home of five potash reduction factories: the American, Nebraska, Alliance, National, and Western potash companies. All these companies were major suppliers of potash during World War I. With the factories came work, and by the spring of 1918, Antioch had grown into a small city with a population of over 5,000 people.

The potash from Antioch was used during the war in the production of fertilizer, Epsom Salts, soda, and other products. The land on which the factories in Antioch had been built were state-owned, and the government's leasing them to private companies attracted public scrutiny. To combat the rumors of favoritism, the Nebraska Secretary of State and Nebraska State Land Commissioner issued a press release claiming that they had leased the land privately rather than publicly to avoid delay because "our country needs the product for munitions." Potash was not used in munitions, but the public generally accepted the falsehood as fact.

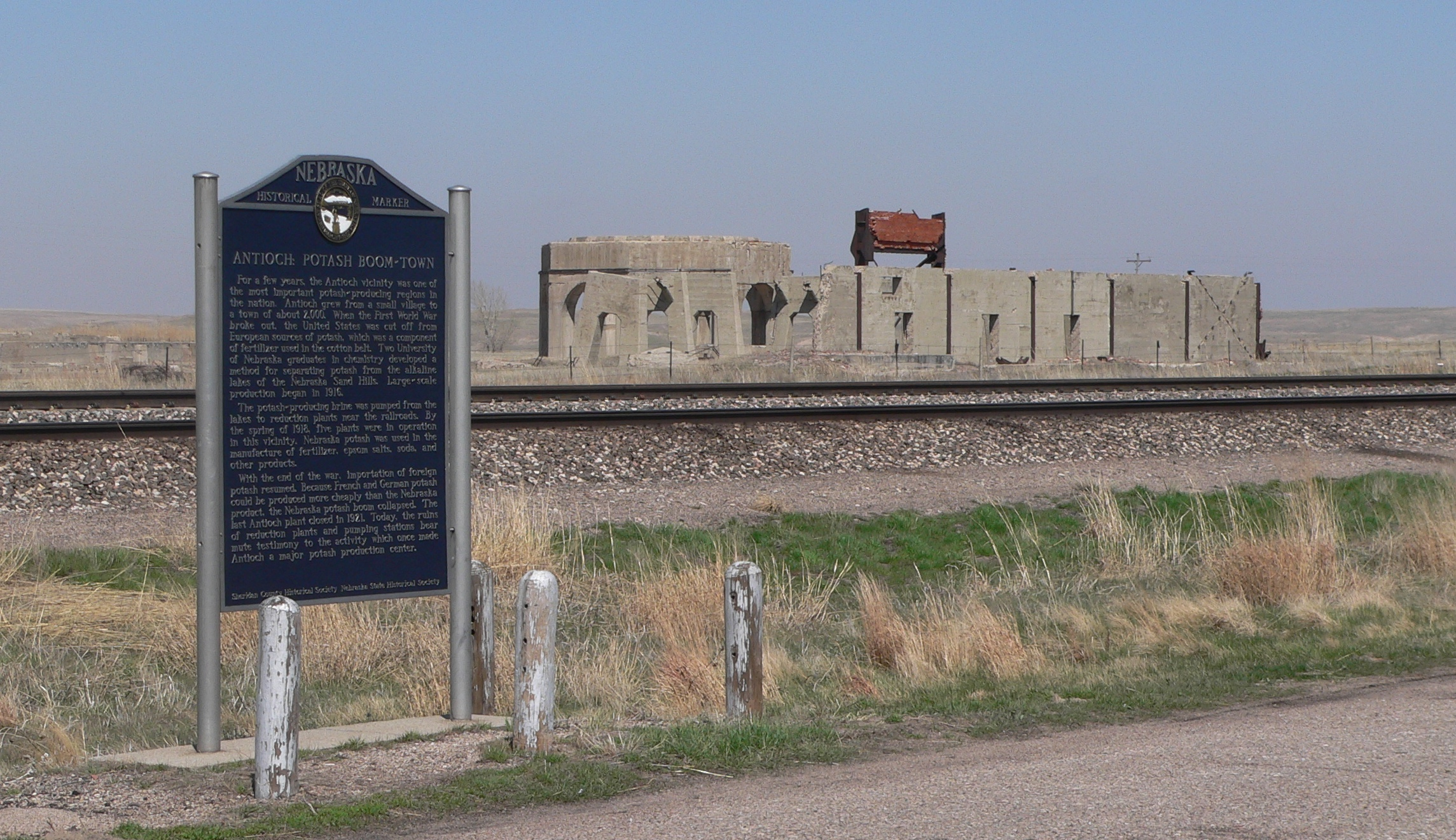
Antioch potash historical marker

When Germany and France resumed trade with the United States in 1921, the potash trade was decimated. German and French potash was cheaper to produce than Nebraska potash and thus destroyed the market for American-made potash. The factories immediately closed. The machinery was sold for scrap; the factories were demolished for the salvage value of the building materials; and the company housing was torn down or moved. Only the foundations of the factories and of some of the larger houses remained. Today, Antioch has fewer than 25 residents.

In 1979, the remains of Antioch's potash plants were added to the National Register of Historic Places, and a historical marker can be found west of what remains of Antioch commemorating the factories and boomtown.

== See also ==
- List of ghost towns in Nebraska
