= Rushville, Nebraska =

City in and county seat of Sheridan Count, Nebraska, United States

- City
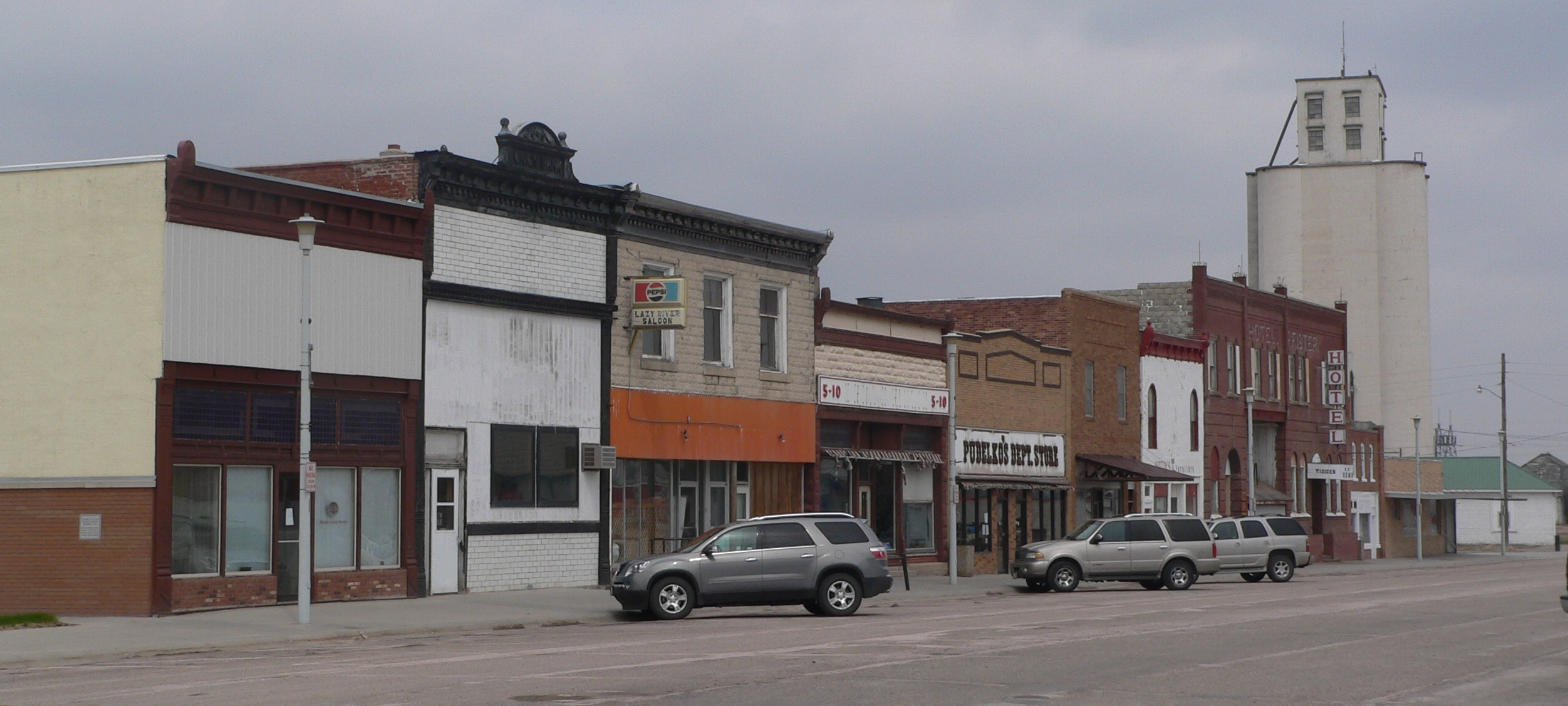
- Downtown west side of north Main Street (2011)

- Location within Sheridan County and Nebraska
- Coordinates: 42°42′48″N 102°28′00″W
- Country: United States
- State: Nebraska
- County: Sheridan
- Platted: 1885
- Named for: Rush Creek

Government
  - Type: Mayor–Council

Area
  - Total: 1.15 sq mi (2.98 km^{2})
  - Land: 1.15 sq mi (2.98 km^{2})
  - Water: 0 sq mi (0.00 km^{2})
- Elevation: 3,740 ft (1,140 m)

Population (2020)
  - Total: 820
  - Density: 710/sq mi (280/km^{2})
- Time zone: UTC-7 (Mountain (MST))
  - Summer (DST): UTC-6 (MDT)
- ZIP code: 69360
- Area code: 308
- FIPS code: 31-42775
- GNIS ID: 2396454
- Website: rushvillene.com

Rushville is a city in Sheridan County, Nebraska, United States, in the remote Sandhills Region. As of the 2020 census, Rushville has a population of 877. It is the county seat of Sheridan County.

== History ==
Rushville was platted in 1885 when the Fremont, Elkhorn, and Missouri Valley Railway was extended to that point. Rushville was incorporated in October 1885.

Rushville was named from Rush Creek. In the Lakota language, Rushville is known as Owátȟokšu or Iwátȟokšu Otȟúŋwahe, meaning "Place where things are transported" or "Transportation City".

== Geography ==
According to the United States Census Bureau, the city has a total area of 1.15 square miles (2.98 km^{2}), all land.

== Demographics ==
Historical population
Census	Pop.	Note	%±
1890	484		—
1900	483		−0.2%
1910	633		31.1%
1920	955		50.9%
1930	1,006		5.3%
1940	1,125		11.8%
1950	1,266		12.5%
1960	1,228		−3.0%
1970	1,137		−7.4%
1980	1,217		7.0%
1990	1,127		−7.4%
2000	999		−11.4%
2010	890		−10.9%
2020	816		−8.3%
U.S. Decennial Census

=== 2010 census ===
As of the census of 2010, there were 890 people, 399 households, and 226 families living in the city. The population density was 773.9 inhabitants per square mile (298.8/km^{2}). There were 498 housing units at an average density of 433.0 per square mile (167.2/km^{2}). The racial makeup of the city was 73.8% White, 0.6% African American, 21.9% Native American, 0.1% Asian, 0.6% from other races, and 3.0% from two or more races. Hispanic or Latino residents of any race were 6.1% of the population.

There were 399 households, of which 30.8% had children under the age of 18 living with them, 39.1% were married couples living together, 13.5% had a female householder with no husband present, 4.0% had a male householder with no wife present, and 43.4% were non-families. 40.4% of all households were made up of individuals, and 20.3% had someone living alone who was 65 years of age or older. The average household size was 2.21 and the average family size was 2.96.

The median age in the city was 39.3 years. 28.5% of residents were under the age of 18; 4.5% were between the ages of 18 and 24; 21.5% were from 25 to 44; 25.4% were from 45 to 64; and 20% were 65 years of age or older. The gender makeup of the city was 43.8% male and 56.2% female.

=== 2000 census ===
As of the census of 2000, there were 999 people, 419 households, and 266 families living in the city. The population density was 857.2 inhabitants per square mile (331.0/km^{2}). There were 518 housing units at an average density of 444.5 per square mile (171.6/km^{2}). The racial makeup of the city was 77.68% White, 0.10% African American, 18.32% Native American, 0.30% from other races, and 3.60% from two or more races. Hispanic or Latino residents of any race were 2.30% of the population.

There were 419 households, out of which 28.9% had children under the age of 18 living with them, 47.5% were married couples living together, 11.7% had a female householder with no husband present, and 36.3% were non-families. 33.7% of all households were made up of individuals, and 16.5% had someone living alone who was 65 years of age or older. The average household size was 2.30 and the average family size was 2.90.

In the city, 25.5% of the population was under the age of 18, 5.9% was from 18 to 24, 25.3% from 25 to 44, 22.3% from 45 to 64, and 20.9% was 65 years of age or older. The median age was 41 years. For every 100 females, there were 88.1 males. For every 100 females age 18 and over, there were 86.5 males.

As of 2000 the median income for a household in the city was $27,361, and the median income for a family was $36,100. Males had a median income of $23,750 versus $20,536 for females. The per capita income for the city was $14,586. About 13.5% of families and 16.4% of the population were below the poverty line, including 28.7% of those under age 18 and 7.0% of those age 65 or over.

== Notable people ==
- John Gottschalk (b. 1943) – retired publisher of the Omaha World-Herald and National president of the Boy Scouts of America
- Kelly Stouffer (b. 1964) – NFL quarterback for the Seattle Seahawks, who graduated from Rushville High School
- Hubert Stowitts (1892–1953) – painter and dancer

== In popular culture ==
The first season of DC Universe television show Lanterns takes place in Rushville.

== See also ==
- List of municipalities in Nebraska
