= Nebraska Highway 67 =

State highway in Nebraska, U.S.

State Highway 67

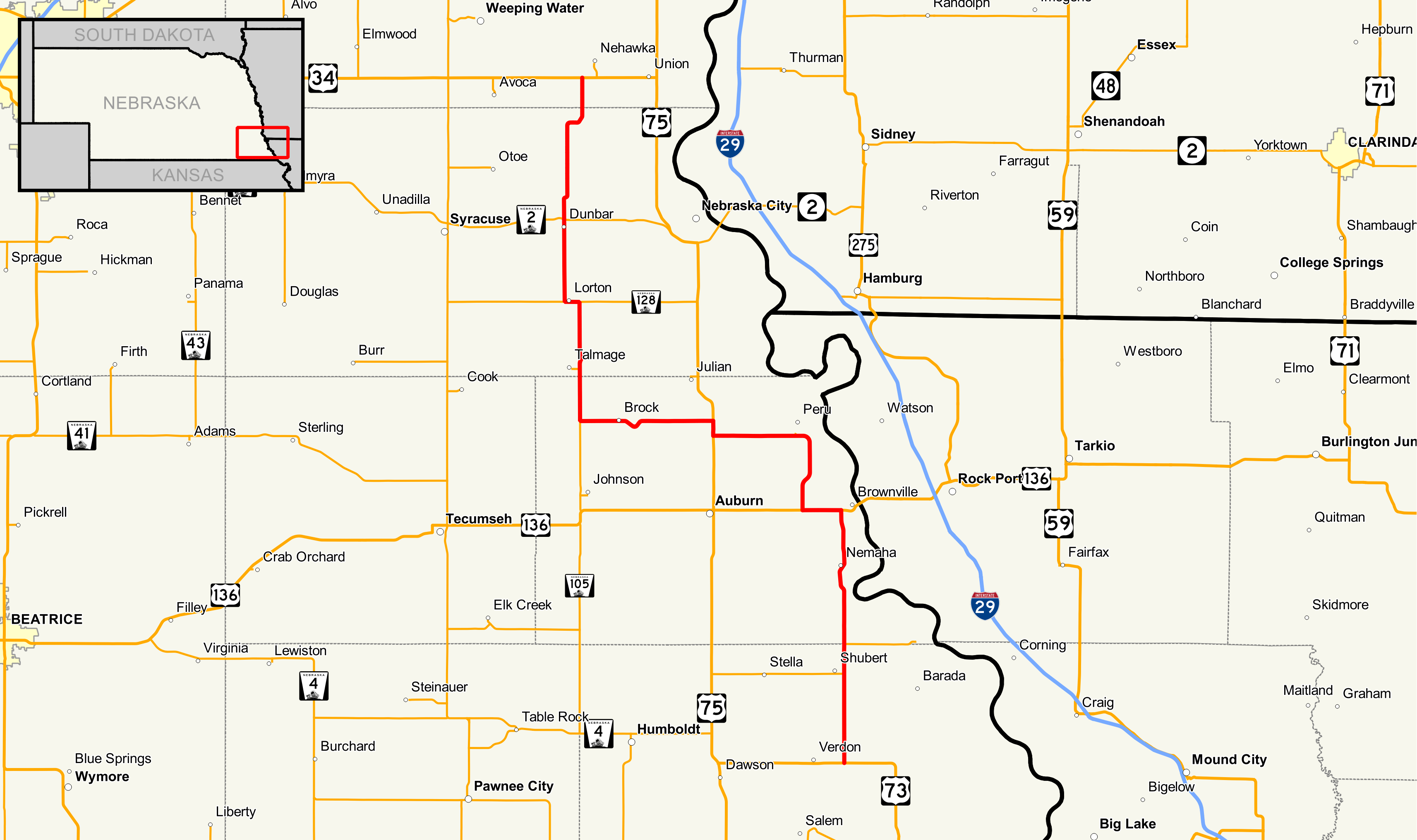
- Nebraska Highway 67 highlighted in red

Route information
- Maintained by NDOT
- Length: 66.49 mi (107.01 km)
- Existed: 1934–present

Major junctions
- South end: US 73 east of Verdon
- US 136 in Brownville; US 75 in Auburn; N-2 north of Dunbar
- North end: US 34 southwest of Nehawka

Location
- Country: United States
- State: Nebraska
- Counties: Richardson, Nemaha, Otoe, Cass

Highway system
- Nebraska State Highway System; Interstate; US; State; Link; Spur; State Spurs; Recreation
| ← N-66 | → N-68 |

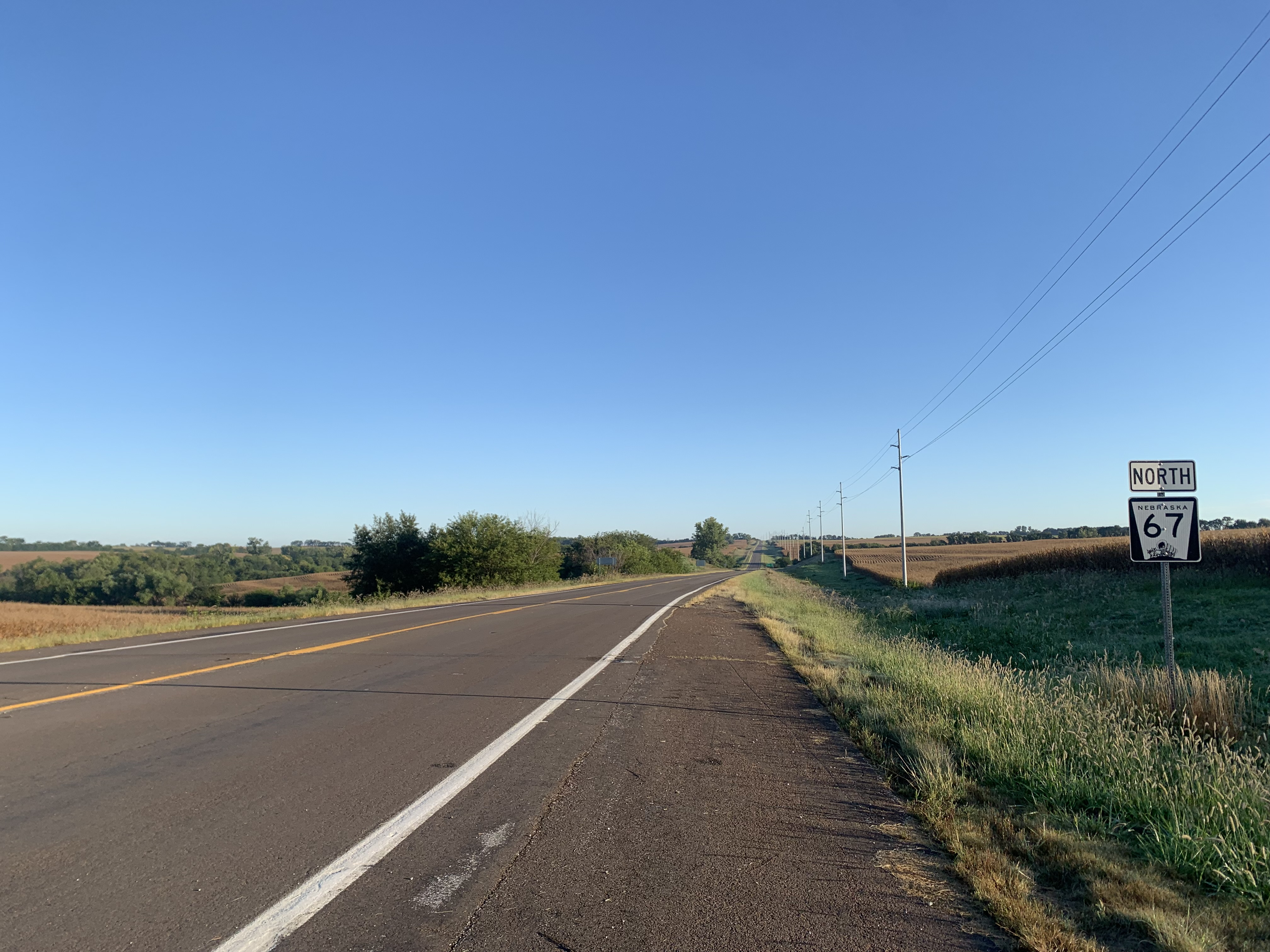
Nebraska Highway 67 in Nemaha County, Nebraska

Nebraska Highway 67 is a highway in southeastern Nebraska. Its southern terminus is at an intersection with U.S. Highway 73 near Verdon. Its northern terminus is at an intersection with U.S. Highway 34 near Nehawka. The segment between Nebraska Highway 2 and US 34 is one of four segments of road in the Nebraska highway system which is gravel.

== Route description ==
Nebraska Highway 67 begins at U.S. Highway 73 east of Verdon and proceeds north into farmland. The road meets Nebraska Highway 62 near Shubert and Nebraska Spur 64E, the highway to Indian Cave State Park. It continues north through Nemaha and meets U.S. Highway 136 near Brownville. It turns west there with US 136 and after 3 miles (4.8 km), turns north towards Peru. Near Peru, it turns westward, meets Nebraska Spur 64G, which runs into Peru, home of Peru State College, and continues west until it meets U.S. Highway 75. After a one-mile (1.6 km) concurrency going northward, it continues west, runs through Brock, and meets Nebraska Highway 105. At its intersection with NE 105, it turns north until it meets Nebraska Highway 128. It turns west at NE 128, goes through Lorton and continues north. It runs through Dunbar and meets Nebraska Highway 2 on the north edge of Dunbar. It continues north from there as a gravel road and eventually ends at U.S. Highway 34 southwest of Nehawka.

== Major intersections ==
| County | Location | mi | km | Destinations | Notes |
|---|---|---|---|---|---|
| Richardson | Verdon | 0.00 | 0.00 | US 73 | Southern terminus |
| Richardson | Shubert | 6.02 | 9.69 | N-62 west | |
| Richardson | Indian Cave State Park | 8.03 | 12.92 | S-64E east | |
| Nemaha | Brownville | 17.23 | 27.73 | US 136 east | South end of US 136 overlap |
| Nemaha | | 19.83 | 31.91 | US 136 west (Central Avenue) | West end of US 136 overlap |
| Nemaha | Peru | 25.81 | 41.54 | S-64G north (644A Avenue) | |
| Nemaha | | 31.32 | 50.40 | US 75 south | South end of US 75 overlap |
| Nemaha | | 32.32 | 52.01 | US 75 north | North end of US 75 overlap |
| Nemaha | | 41.57 | 66.90 | N-105 south | |
| Otoe | Talmage | 45.07 | 72.53 | S-66D west | |
| Otoe | Lorton | 49.64 | 79.89 | N-128 east (N Road) | South end of NE 128 overlap |
| Otoe | Lorton | 50.63 | 81.48 | N-128 west (N Road) | North end of NE 128 overlap |
| Otoe | Dunbar | 56.17 | 90.40 | N-2 | |
| Cass | | 66.49 | 107.01 | US 34 (East O Street) | Northern terminus |
1.000 mi = 1.609 km; 1.000 km = 0.621 mi: Concurrency terminus
