= Nebraska Highway 105 =

State highway in Nebraska, U.S.

State Highway 105

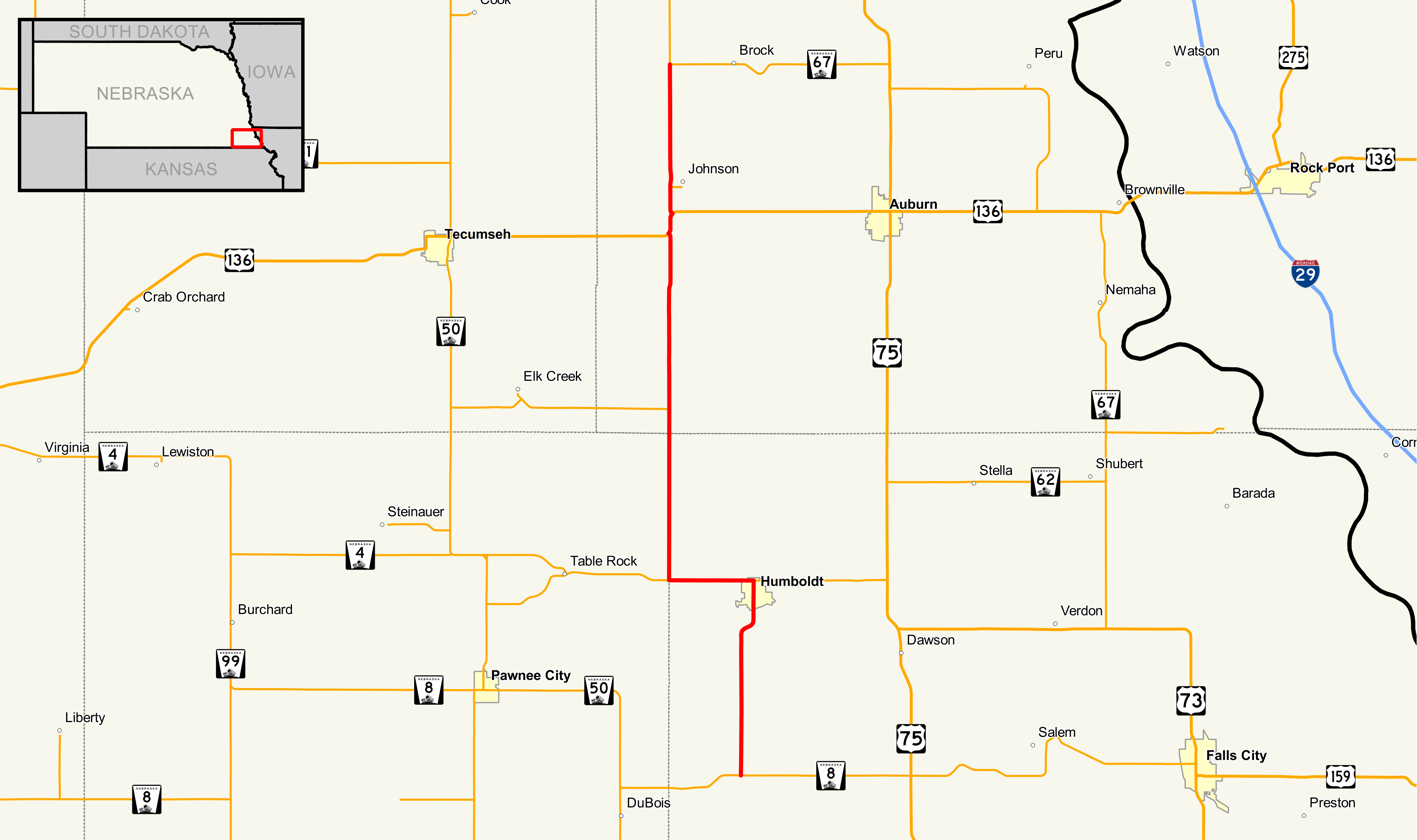
- Nebraska Highway 105 highlighted in red

Route information
- Maintained by NDOT
- Length: 32.85 mi (52.87 km)
- Existed: 1936–present

Major junctions
- South end: N-8 south of Humboldt
- N-4 in Humboldt; US 136 south of Johnson
- North end: N-67 west of Brock

Location
- Country: United States
- State: Nebraska
- Counties: Richardson, Pawnee, Nemaha

Highway system
- Nebraska State Highway System; Interstate; US; State; Link; Spur; State Spurs; Recreation
← N-103	→ N-109

Nebraska Highway 105 (N-105) is a 32.85-mile (52.87 km) state highway in Richardson, Pawnee, and Nemaha counties in Nebraska, United States. Its southern terminus is at an intersection with Nebraska Highway 8 south of Humboldt. Its northern terminus is at an intersection with Nebraska Highway 67 west of Brock.

== Route description ==
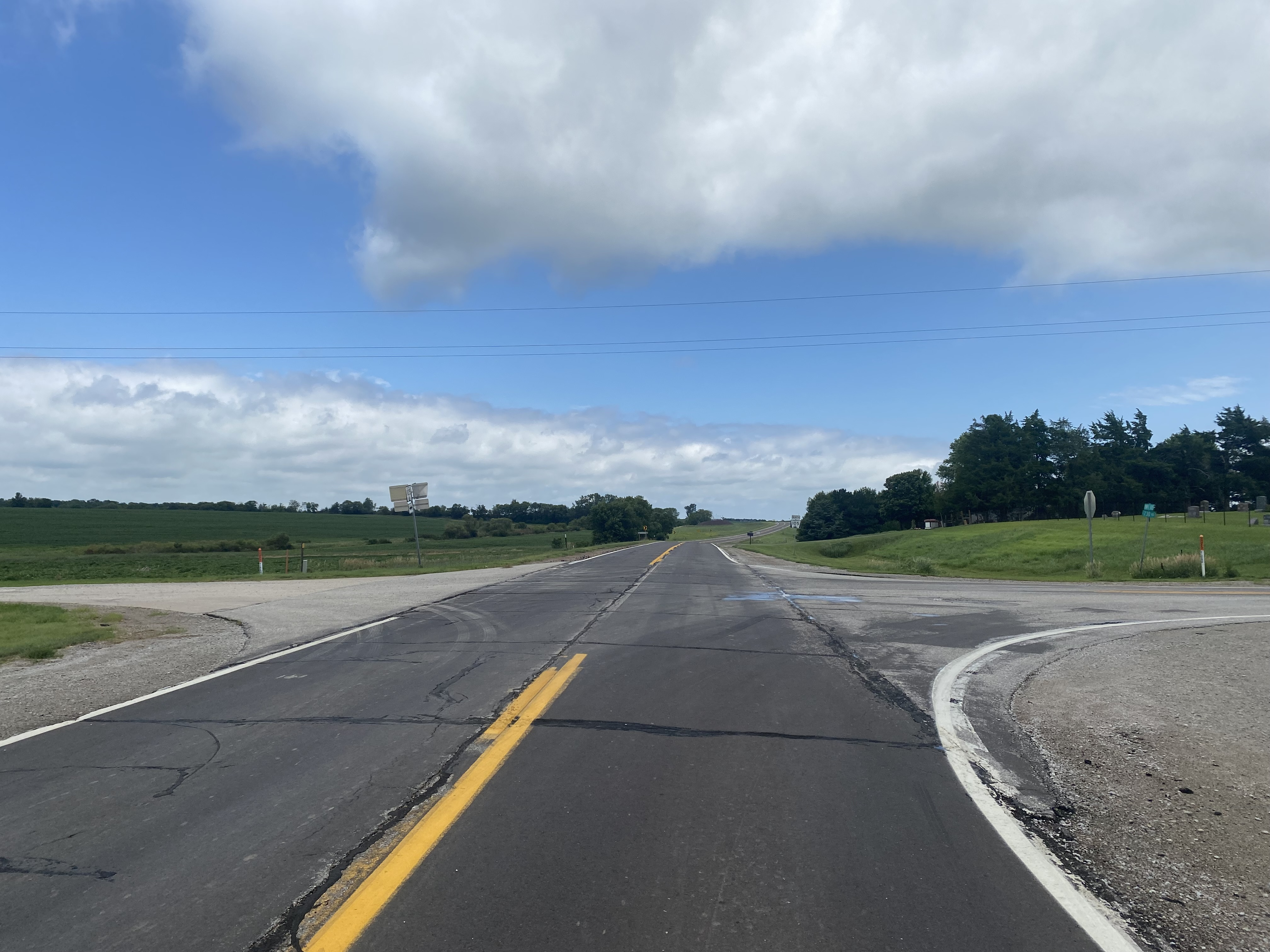
State Highway 105 junction with 730 road west of Johnson, Nebraska

Nebraska Highway 105 begins at an intersection with NE 8 south of Humboldt. It heads in a northbound direction through farmland, turning slightly to the northeast before entering Humboldt. At the north edge of the city, the highway meets with NE 4 and runs concurrently to the west for about 3.5 miles (5.6 km). At that point, NE 105 splits and heads directly to the north. It passes by NE 62 east of Elk Creek. Further north, it intersects with US 136 and runs concurrently northward for about a mile. NE 105 continues to the north near Johnson. To the north of Johnson, the highway meets its termination point at NE 67 west of Brock.

== Major intersections ==
County	Location	mi	km	Destinations	Notes
Richardson		0.00	0.00	N-8 (555th Avenue)	
Richardson	Humboldt	8.22	13.23	N-4 east	Southern end of N-4 concurrency
Richardson–Pawnee county line		11.69	18.81	N-4 west	Northern end of N-4 concurrency
Nemaha		18.69	30.08	N-62 west	
Nemaha		25.88	41.65	US 136 west	Southern end of US 136 concurrency
Nemaha		26.73	43.02	US 136 east	Northern end of US 136 concurrency
Nemaha	Johnson	27.84	44.80	S-64B east	
Nemaha		32.85	52.87	N-67	
1.000 mi = 1.609 km; 1.000 km = 0.621 mi: Concurrency terminus

== See also ==
- List of state highways in Nebraska
