= N62 =

N62 may refer to:

== Roads ==
- N62 road (Ireland)
- Western Scheldt Tunnel, in the Netherlands
- N62 highway, in the Philippines
- Nebraska Highway 62, in the United States

== Other uses ==
- N62 (Long Island bus)
- BMW N62, an automobile engine
- HMS Rover (N62), a submarine of the Royal Navy
