= Southeast Nebraska Consolidated Schools =

School district in Nebraska, United States

Southeast Nebraska Consolidated Schools (ID#74-0501-000, a.k.a. District 70) was a school district in Nebraska. Its school was in Stella. In addition to Stella, the district included Barada, Bratton Union, Higgins, Nemaha, and Shubert.

The consolidated school opened in 1968.

The school community made the decision to close the school district because the number of pupils was declining and because the state was sending fewer dollars to the district.

On January 1, 2009, it merged into the Humboldt Table Rock Steinauer School District. The majority of the students were to move on to that district, though some were to attend Falls City Public Schools or Johnson Brock School District. The district sold the school building to an individual and was to give it to him on August 1 of that year.

== See also ==
- List of school districts in Nebraska
