= Steinauer =

Steinauer is a surname. Notable people with the surname include:

- Marco Steinauer (born 1976), Swiss ski jumper
- Mathias Steinauer, (born 1959), Swiss composer
- Orlondo Steinauer (born 1973), American football player
- Steinauer vineyard was near Naumburg

== See also ==
- Steinauer, Nebraska, village in Pawnee County, Nebraska, United States
