= Vernon Hastings =

United States military officer

Vernon Leroy Hastings
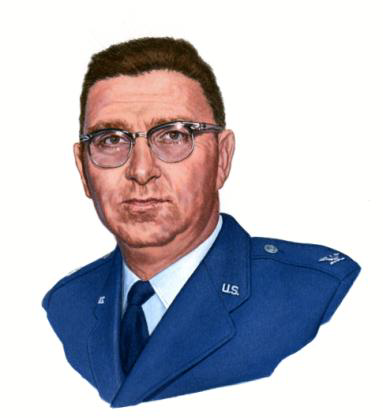
- Born: 4 August 1917; Table Rock, Nebraska, U.S.
- Died: 19 July 2012 (aged 94); Sacramento, California, U.S.
- Burial place: Queen of Heaven Catholic Cemetery, Mesa, Arizona
- Military career
- Allegiance: United States
- Branch: United States Army (1939–1947); United States Air Force (1947–1966)
- Service years: 1939–1966
- Rank: Colonel
- Other work: Professor and director of the construction program at Arizona State University

Vernon Leroy Hastings (4 August 1917 – 19 July 2012) was a United States Air Force (USAF) officer and engineer who was charge of the design of base facilities for the Atlas missile, the United States' first Intercontinental Ballistic Missile (ICBM) and directed their deployment. He was also the head of the team that selected Camp Cooke, California, for the site for the first Atlas launch complex. This facility subsequently became Vandenberg Air Force Base. He was later the professor and director of the construction program at Arizona State University and helped raised millions of dollars for endowed scholarships for the Del E. Webb School of Construction there.

== Early life and education ==
Vernon Leroy Hastings was born in Table Rock, Nebraska, on 4 August 1917 and grew up on a farm. He had a brother, Robert, and three sisters: Lotus, Ida and Patricia. He attended school in Table Rock and graduated from Lincoln High School in Lincoln, Nebraska, in 1935.

== World War II ==
On 9 November 1939 he enlisted in the United States Army Air Corps at Chanute Field, Illinois. He became a machinist instructor. In January 1942, soon after the United States joined World War II, he was selected for officer training and sent to the Army Air Corps's Officer Candidate School. He graduated in May, and was commissioned as a second lieutenant. His first command was a detachment of Air Corps cadets studying pre-meteorology at the University of Wisconsin. During the rest of the war he held various technical training appointments.

== Post-war ==
After the war ended, Hastings entered the University of Nebraska, where he earned a Bachelor of Science degree in mechanical engineering in 1949. He was the base engineer at Goose Bay, Labrador, from 1949 to 1951, providing engineer support for Arctic weather and radar stations. He was the chief of the Procurement Branch of the US Army Chemical Procurement District in Chicago, Illinois, from January 1952 to April 1954, and then the deputy chief of Air Force Logistics Command's Facilities Maintenance Branch at Wright-Patterson Air Force Base in Ohio from May 1953 to July 1954. The following year he earned a Master of Science degree in industrial engineering from Oklahoma Agricultural and Mechanical College, writing a thesis on, "A Study of Activities in an Engineering Research Organization".

In August 1955 Hastings joined Colonel Bernard Schriever's Western Development Division, which became the Air Force Ballistic Missile Division on 1 June 1957. Over the next four years Hastings was the chief of the Initial Operation Capability (IOC) Branch. As such, he was in charge of the design of base facilities for the Atlas missile, the United States' first Intercontinental Ballistic Missile (ICBM). He was also the head of the team that selected Camp Cooke, California, for the site for the first Atlas launch complex as Vandenberg Air Force Base. In 1959 he was selected to command the Site Activation Task Force for the first two Atlas missile squadrons, the 566th Strategic Missile Squadron at Offutt Air Force Base in Nebraska, and the 551st Strategic Missile Squadron at Lincoln Air Force Base in Nebraska. In this role he coordinated the installation of equipment and the check out of the missiles prior to their being handed over to the Strategic Air Command. He also supervised the construction of the first missile silos in Nebraska and Iowa. In 1961 and 1962 he was the chairman of the Missile Sites Labor Committee in Omaha, Nebraska, with responsibility for labor relations at missile sites all over the United States.

From 1962 to 1966, Hastings was the director of the Civil Engineering Center at the Air Force Institute of Technology (AFIT) at Wright-Patterson Air Force Base in Ohio. He was promoted to colonel in 1963.

== Later life ==
Hastings retired from the USAF to become the assistant to the dean of Purdue University's School of Technology in 1966, and then the assistant dean in 1969. In 1973 he became the professor and director of the construction program at Arizona State University. Although he met opposition from the school's vice president for research on the grounds that construction was not an academic subject and had no place on the university campus, in 1985 he succeeded in getting approval for master's degrees to be awarded in the subject. By then, construction was being taught in a hundred colleges and universities, and graduates were in much demand. Hastings used the Atlas program as an example of a large scale construction project. He retired in 1987 and became a professor emeritus. As an emeritus, Hastings raised millions of dollars in endowed scholarships for the Del E. Webb School of Construction, and the Del E. Webb Foundation funded an $80,000 endowment in his name in 2002. The Del E Webb School of Construction disburses $300,000 annually in scholarships.

Hastings died at his residence in Sacramento, California, on 19 July 2012. His first wife, Norma, and son Michael had died before him. He was survived by his second wife Violet, daughter Margaret and sons Robert and Thomas. He was buried at the Queen of Heaven Cemetery in Mesa, Arizona.
