= Deroin =

Deroin may refer to:

== People ==
- Anthony Deroin (born 1979), French former professional footballer
- Audrey Deroin (born 1989), French handball player
- Jeanne Deroin (1805–1894), French socialist feminist

== Place ==
- St. Deroin, Nebraska, a ghost town
