= St. Deroin, Nebraska =

- Ghost town
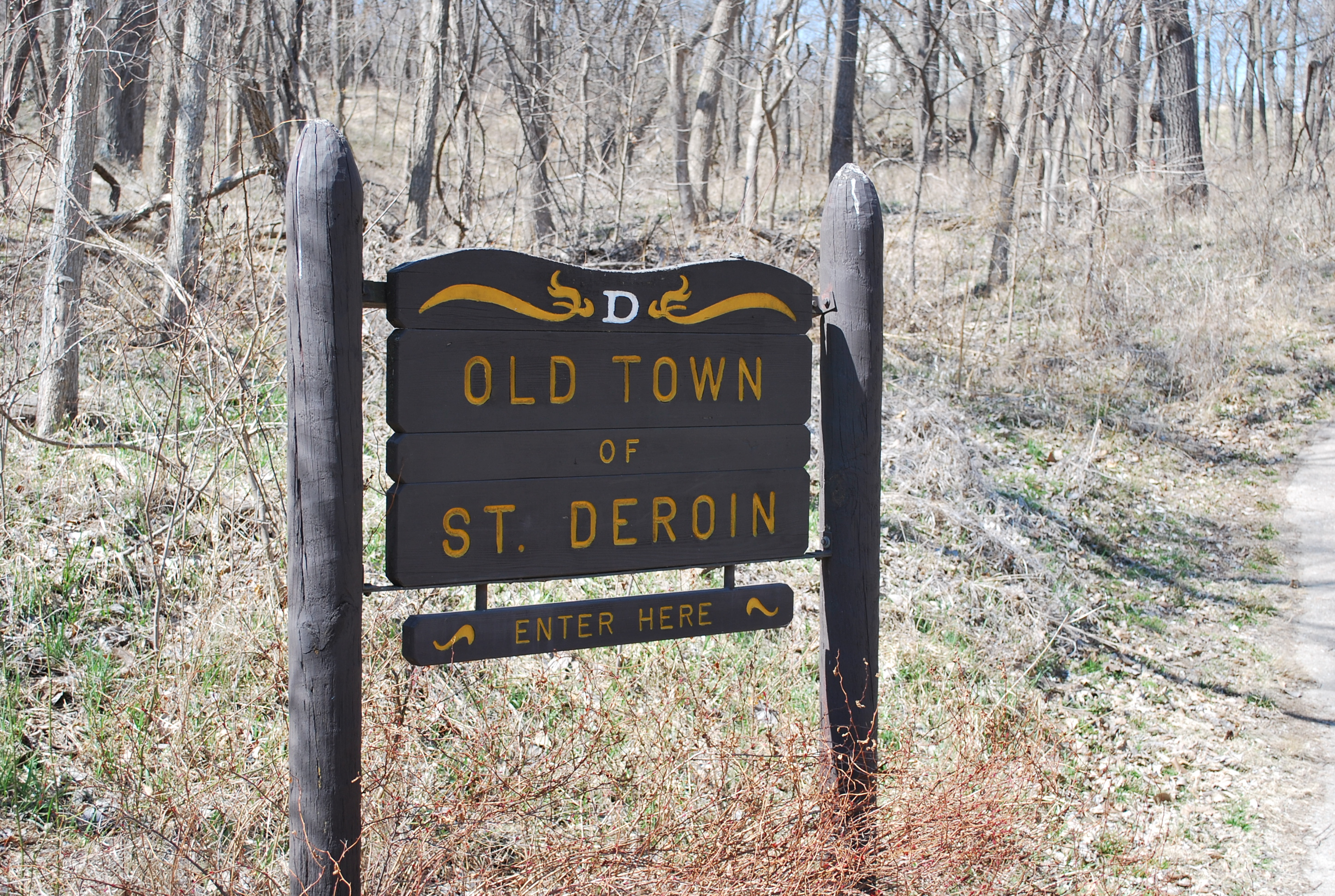
- Sign on path leading to St. Deroin town site

- Location within the state of Nebraska
- Coordinates: 40°15′19″N 95°34′03″W
- Country: United States
- State: Nebraska
- County: Nemaha
- Time zone: UTC-6 (Central (CST))
  - Summer (DST): UTC-5 (CDT)

St. Deroin is a ghost town in Nemaha County, Nebraska, United States, originally located below the river bluffs on the Missouri River. Formally chartered in 1854, the town had a popular ferry crossing over the Missouri River for more than three decades. The river changed course, ending the ferry. After a railroad spur bypassed the town, it drew off more commerce. The community rebuilt its school on the river bluff when it was threatened by flooding; this area was also used for the cemetery. The town was completely abandoned by 1920, as flooding had destroyed much of the townsite. The site is at the northern edge of Indian Cave State Park.

== History ==
Founded by "half-breeds" to serve the Nemaha Half-Breed Reservation, the town grew up around a trading post and was named in 1853 after Joseph Deroin (1819-1858), the trader. Deroin was the son of a Métis French Canadian trapper Amable Derouin and his Otoe wife. The elder Derouin had traded along the nearby Missouri River for decades, and a trading post was already operating near the townsite when Lewis and Clark came through with their expedition in 1804.

In 1840, Joseph Deroin set up a trading post along the river's edge at the mouth of the Platte River, at the main village of the Otoe. He married Meek-Ka-Ahu-me, an Omaha woman, and they had a daughter Mary. In 1842, Deroin also married the two Métis sisters, Julia and Susée Baskette (Bousquet), who were daughters of an Otoe woman; together he had a total of eight children with them. Joseph and his brother John Deroin each received allotments of land at the Nemaha Reservation, which was established in 1830. Joseph's daughter Mary and his third wife, Susée Baskette Deroin, also were recorded as having allotments there. Joseph was murdered in 1858 by a white settler (husband of a Métis wife) in a dispute over money owed.

Increasingly, white settlers were moving into Otoe and Omaha land, as well as the Nemaha Reservation, and displacing Native residents. They laid out a townsite below the river bluffs in 1856. Although the Native Americans appealed to the US government to remove the interlopers, they were unsuccessful. European American settlers moved in around Deroin's trading post and named the town St. Deroin, hoping to link it to the downriver cities of St. Joseph and St. Louis. From 1854, a ferry service brought passengers from Iowa across the Missouri.

=== Buildings ===
In addition to the early trading post and ferry service, a U.S. Post Office operated in the town from 1861 to 1910. The town had a subscription school that was started in 1858. Residents built a brick schoolhouse in 1868, when river commerce revived after the end of the American Civil War. In 1912 when the river was rapidly swallowing the town site, the school building was dismantled and reassembled on the higher ground of the river bluffs. Other buildings in town included a hotel and two blacksmith shops.

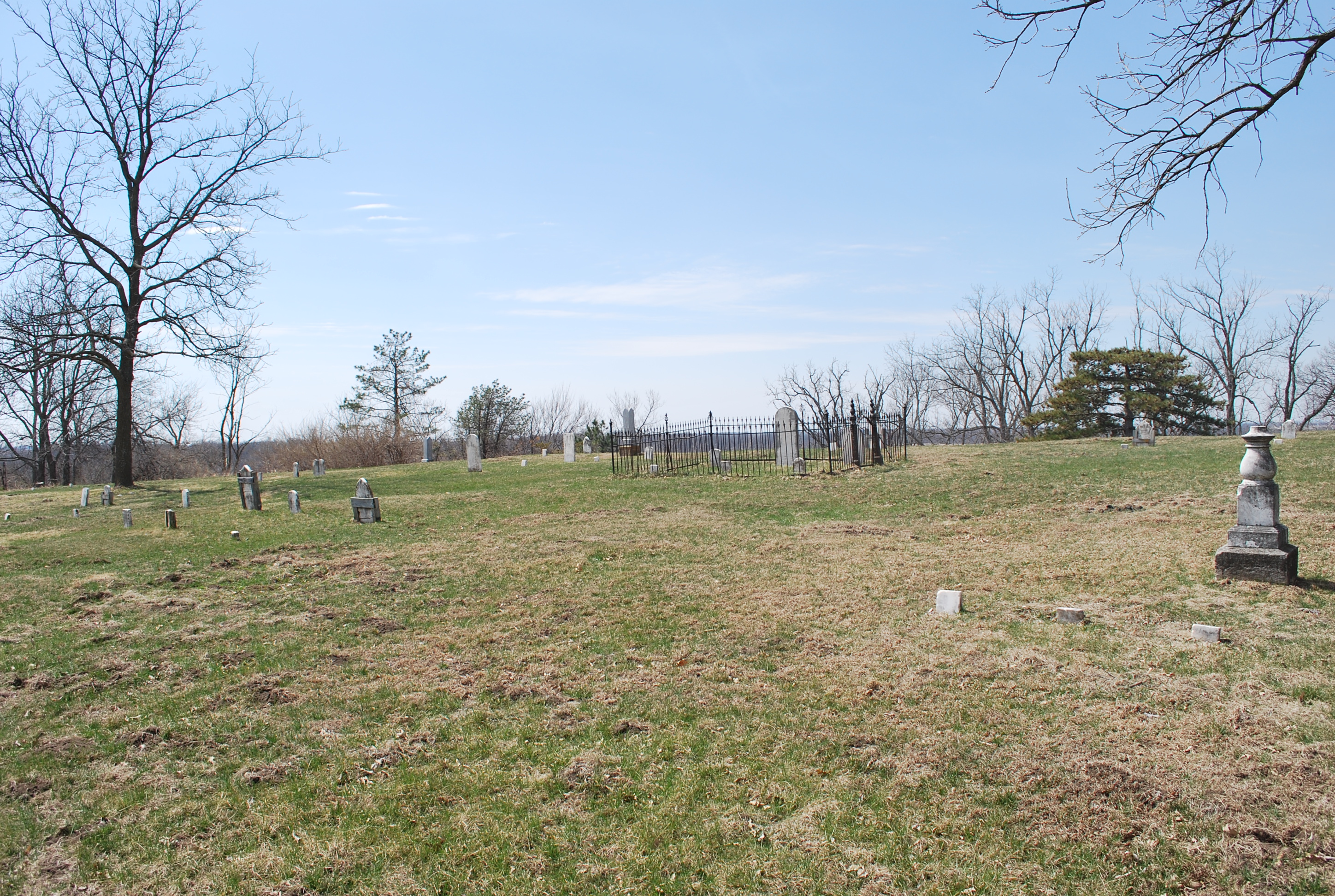
St. Deroin Cemetery

In the 1870s, at probably its economic peak, the town had nearly 200 residents and 20 businesses. By 1880, its population had dropped to about 90, and spring floods washed away some buildings on the floodplain. Steamboats became infrequent and, with construction of a railroad spur between Nemaha and Shubert, Nebraska that bypassed St. Deroin, its economic life dried up.

After thirty years of ferries at St. Deroin, the Missouri River changed course and made ferrying impossible. The service was moved to Brownville in 1915.

=== Floods ===
Since the 1840s, most of the town below the river bluff has been washed away by floods. Today only the cemetery and the St. Deroin School sit on the bluffs above the original location. The town was completely abandoned by 1920.

== Location ==
St. Deroin was located on the Missouri River near the southeast corner of Nemaha County. It is located within the northern border of Indian Cave State Park, approximately four miles northeast of Barada in the U.S. state of Nebraska.

== See also ==
- History of Nebraska
- Deroin Bend Island
