= Howe, Nebraska =

Unincorporated community in Nebraska, United States

- Unincorporated community
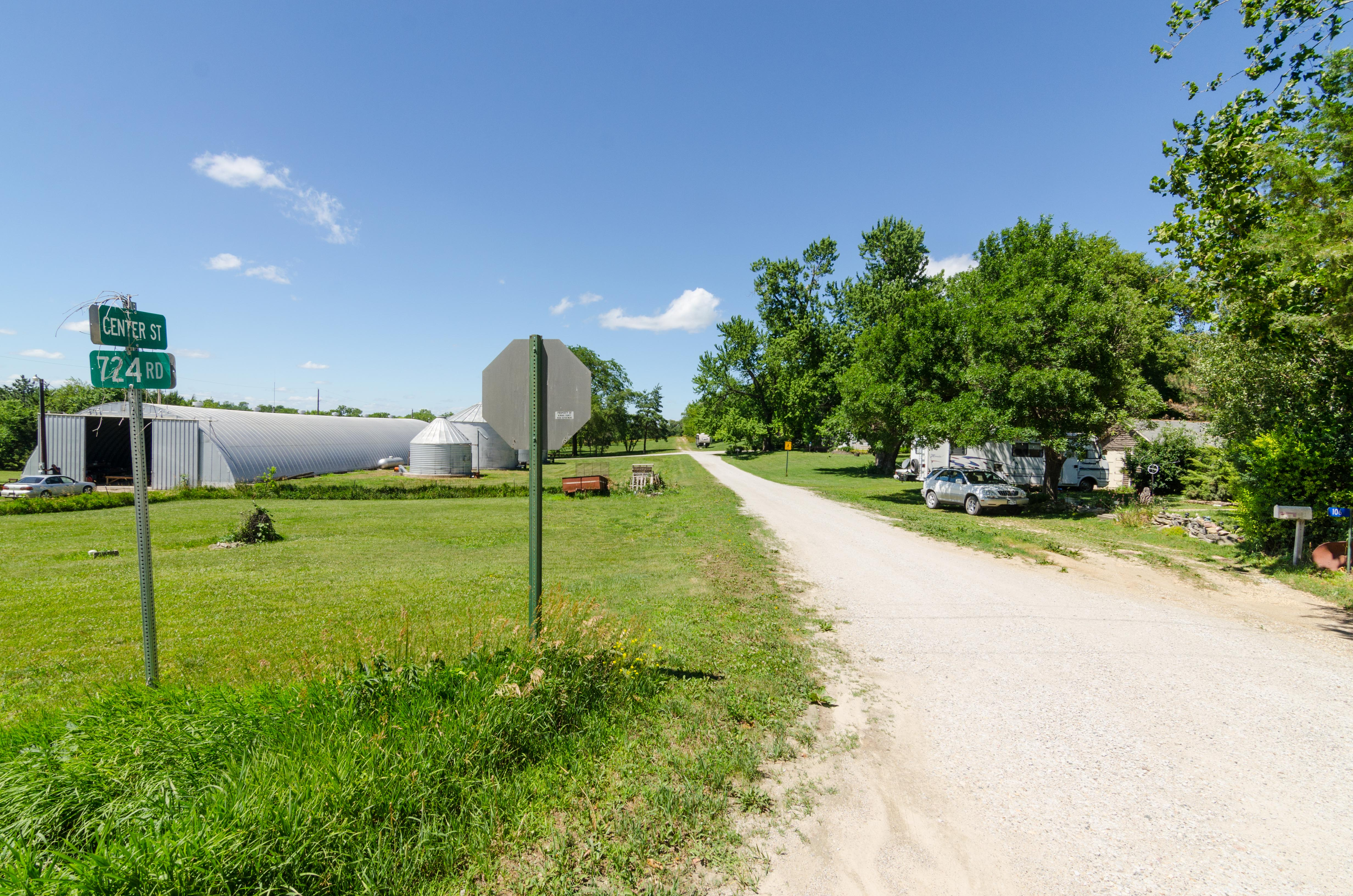
- Center Street in Howe

- Location within the state of Nebraska
- Coordinates: 40°19′19″N 95°49′09″W
- Country: United States
- State: Nebraska
- County: Nemaha
- Elevation: 1,020 ft (310 m)
- Time zone: UTC-6 (Central (CST))
  - Summer (DST): UTC-5 (CDT)
- ZIP codes: 68305
- GNIS feature ID: 830173

Howe is an unincorporated community in Nemaha County, Nebraska, United States. Howe is part of Zip code 68305, Auburn, Nebraska, with the nearest postal facility at Auburn.

== History ==
A post office was established at Howe in 1882, and remained in operation until it was discontinued in 1962. The community was named for Major Church Howe, an American diplomat.

Howe was a station and shipping point on the Missouri Pacific Railroad.
