= Auburn Public Schools =

School district in Nebraska, United States

Auburn Public Schools, District #29, is a public school district in Nemaha County, Nebraska, United States, based in Auburn. The school district includes the towns of Auburn, Brownville, Howe, Julian, and Peru, and the surrounding area in southeast Nebraska.

Auburn Public Schools operates the following schools:

- Calvert Elementary - preschool through 5th grade
- Auburn Middle School
- Auburn High School - located in the same building as Auburn Middle School
- The Alternative Education Center - located at the Central Office; serves students of all grades

== District boundary ==
Within Nemaha County, the district includes Auburn, Brownville, Julian, and Peru. The district includes a very small part of Nemaha.

A small portion of the district extends into Richardson County.

== Auburn School Board ==
The Auburn School Board consists of six members who are elected by the voters of the district. Board members are voted at large and serve four-year staggered terms. The board sets school policies within the guidelines of state and federal law and the Nebraska State Board of Education. Board meetings are held the second Monday of each month at the Auburn Schools Central Office board room, located at 1713 J Street, Auburn, Nebraska. Meetings begin at 5:30 pm. Special sessions are announced to the public in advance.

== School administration ==
- Superintendent - Kevin Reiman
- Director of School Improvement - Dr. Nancy Fuller
- Director of Special Education - Amy Kroll
- 6-12 Principal - Vernon Golladay
- 6-12 Asst. Principal / Activities Director - Scott Anderson
- K-5 Principal - Jackie Kelsay

== Accountability for a Quality Education System, Today and Tomorrow ==
The first-ever results of Nebraska's new accountability system were released on Friday, December 4, 2015, showing that Auburn Public Schools was designated as one of Nebraska's five "Excellent" school districts. Bennington Public Schools, Elkhorn Public Schools, Potter-Dix Public Schools, and Riverside Public Schools were also named as Excellent districts.

The new state system, Accountability for a Quality Education System, Today and Tomorrow (Accountability for a Quality Education System, Today and Tomorrow), designates all public school districts and school buildings as Excellent, Great, Good, or Needs Improvement. Auburn High School and Auburn Middle School were named as Excellent buildings. Calvert Elementary was classified as a Great building.

The overall rating includes measures from two areas — academic and effective instructional practices. AQuESTT focuses first on classifying schools and districts using state test scores, graduation rates, student participation rates, and year-to-year improvement and growth – criteria that were used in the state's past accountability system.

The second component goes even further. Under AQuESTT, districts and schools are required to self-assess their practices embedded in six tenets for successful schooling. These tenets are 1) Positive School Partnerships and Relationships and Student Success, 2) Transitions between grades and school buildings, 3) Educational Opportunities and Access, 4) College and Career Readiness, 5) Multiple Assessments, and 6) Educator Effectiveness. Each tenet is evaluated on a 0-3 scale: Not at All - 0; Limited Extent – 1; Moderate Extent - 2; and Great Extent - 3.

AQuESTT encourages schools to focus on every student every day and to build a system for continuous school improvement that supports students, educators and the school learning environment.

== Nebraska Performance Accountability System ==
NePAS was Nebraska's testing accountability system prior to 2015. NePAS was developed to report how students in each of Nebraska's 249 school districts scored on statewide reading, math, science and writing tests.

NePAS provided numerous rankings in four grade level configurations: grades 3-5; grades 6-8; grades 9-12; and district (grades 3-12). Within each grade level, districts received separate rankings for each statewide test: NeSA-Reading, NeSA-Math, NeSA-Science, and NeSA-Writing. These results can be found in the Status section of NePAS, which provides 15 rankings.

Auburn Public Schools' district rankings in 2012 fell within the following percentages:

- Top 10% - 2 indicators
- Top 20% - 5 indicators
- Top 25% - 9 indicators
- Top 33.3% - 11 indicators
- Top 50% - 14 indicators

When compared to schools of similar size in Nebraska, Auburn High School ranked 3rd in writing, 5th in science, and 10th in reading and math. A complete listing of their rankings can be found on the State of School Report Card on the Nebraska Department of Education web page.
