= Rohrs, Nebraska =

Unincorporated community in Nebraska, U.S.

Coordinates: 40°23′34″N 95°55′57″W

Rohrs is an unincorporated community in Nemaha County, Nebraska, United States.

== History ==
A post office was established at Rohrs in 1917, and remained in operation until it was discontinued in 1944.

Rohrs was a station and trading point on the Missouri Pacific Railroad.
