= Julian, Nebraska =

- Village
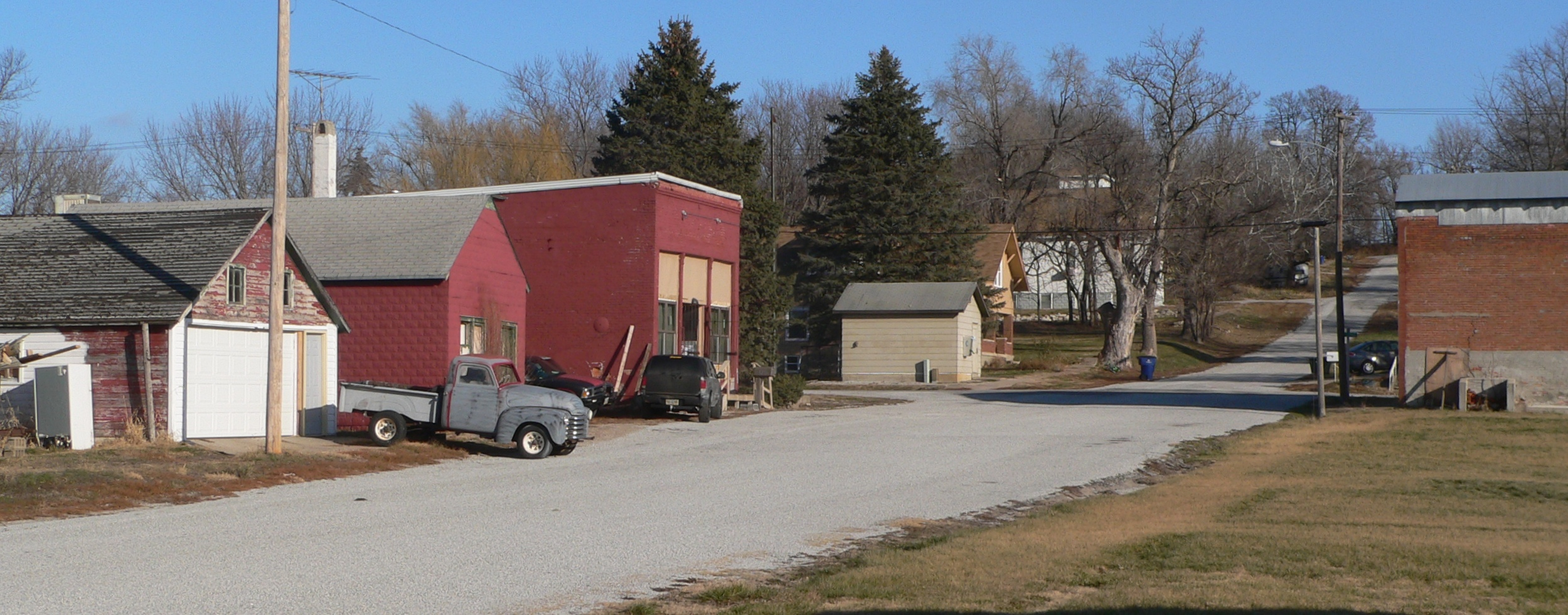
- Downtown Julian: West Street

- Location of Julian, Nebraska
- Coordinates: 40°31′17″N 95°52′3″W
- Country: United States
- State: Nebraska
- County: Nemaha

Area
  - Total: 0.089 sq mi (0.23 km^{2})
  - Land: 0.089 sq mi (0.23 km^{2})
  - Water: 0 sq mi (0.00 km^{2})
- Elevation: 1,024 ft (312 m)

Population (2020)
  - Total: 48
  - Estimate (2021): 48
  - Density: 540/sq mi (210/km^{2})
- Time zone: UTC-6 (Central (CST))
  - Summer (DST): UTC-5 (CDT)
- ZIP code: 68378
- Area code: 402
- FIPS code: 31-24915
- GNIS feature ID: 0830423

Julian is a village in Nemaha County, Nebraska, United States. The population was 48 at the 2020 census.

== Geography ==
Julian is located at 40°31′17″N 95°52′3″W (40.521309, -95.867413).

According to the United States Census Bureau, the village has a total area of 0.09 square miles (0.23 km^{2}), all land.

== Demographics ==
Historical population
| Census | Pop. | Note | %± |
|---|---|---|---|
| 1900 | 206 | | — |
| 1910 | 168 | | −18.4% |
| 1920 | 181 | | 7.7% |
| 1930 | 156 | | −13.8% |
| 1940 | 136 | | −12.8% |
| 1950 | 123 | | −9.6% |
| 1960 | 131 | | 6.5% |
| 1970 | 80 | | −38.9% |
| 1980 | 87 | | 8.8% |
| 1990 | 71 | | −18.4% |
| 2000 | 63 | | −11.3% |
| 2010 | 59 | | −6.3% |
| 2020 | 46 | | −22.0% |
| 2021 (est.) | 48 | ▲ | 4.3% |
U.S. Decennial Census

=== 2010 census ===
As of the census of 2010, there were 59 people, 28 households, and 16 families residing in the village. The population density was 655.6 inhabitants per square mile (253.1/km^{2}). There were 38 housing units at an average density of 422.2 per square mile (163.0/km^{2}). The racial makeup of the village was 96.6% White, 1.7% from other races, and 1.7% from two or more races. Hispanic or Latino of any race were 1.7% of the population.

There were 28 households, of which 28.6% had children under the age of 18 living with them, 35.7% were married couples living together, 14.3% had a female householder with no husband present, 7.1% had a male householder with no wife present, and 42.9% were non-families. 39.3% of all households were made up of individuals, and 3.6% had someone living alone who was 65 years of age or older. The average household size was 2.11 and the average family size was 2.81.

The median age in the village was 43.6 years. 20.3% of residents were under the age of 18; 3.5% were between the ages of 18 and 24; 34% were from 25 to 44; 30.6% were from 45 to 64; and 11.9% were 65 years of age or older. The gender makeup of the village was 50.8% male and 49.2% female.

=== 2000 census ===
As of the census of 2000, there were 63 people, 28 households, and 15 families residing in the village. The population density was 714.5 inhabitants per square mile (275.9/km^{2}). There were 35 housing units at an average density of 396.9 per square mile (153.2/km^{2}). The racial makeup of the village was 100.00% White.

There were 28 households, out of which 28.6% had children under the age of 18 living with them, 39.3% were married couples living together, 14.3% had a female householder with no husband present, and 46.4% were non-families. 39.3% of all households were made up of individuals, and 21.4% had someone living alone who was 65 years of age or older. The average household size was 2.25 and the average family size was 3.13.

In the village, the population was spread out, with 20.6% under the age of 18, 12.7% from 18 to 24, 22.2% from 25 to 44, 31.7% from 45 to 64, and 12.7% who were 65 years of age or older. The median age was 40 years. For every 100 females, there were 80.0 males. For every 100 females age 18 and over, there were 72.4 males.

The median income for a household in the village was $32,188, and the median income for a family was $30,000. Males had a median income of $25,000 versus $16,250 for females. The per capita income for the village was $19,303. There were 18.8% of families and 21.1% of the population living below the poverty line, including 46.2% of under eighteens and none of those over 64.

== History ==
Julian was settled by French settlers. It was named for Julian Bahuaud, an early settler from France. The first name was chosen as no one seemed to be able to pronounce his last name. In June 1899, Julian Bahuaud was murdered for his money. He lived alone about 1/2 miles south of Julian. The murder went unsolved for 14 years. In 1913 one of three men who were under suspicion had a heatstroke in Kansas. He thought he was going to die so he confessed to his part in the murder. He recovered, was brought back to Auburn where he was tried and convicted. The murderer spent the rest of his life in the Nebraska State Penitentiary.

== Education ==
The school district is Auburn Public Schools.

== In popular culture ==
The novel Brave in Season (Sunbury Press, 2023), written by Jon Volkmer, is set in Julian.
