= Nebraska Highway 62 =

State highway in Nebraska, U.S.

State Highway 62

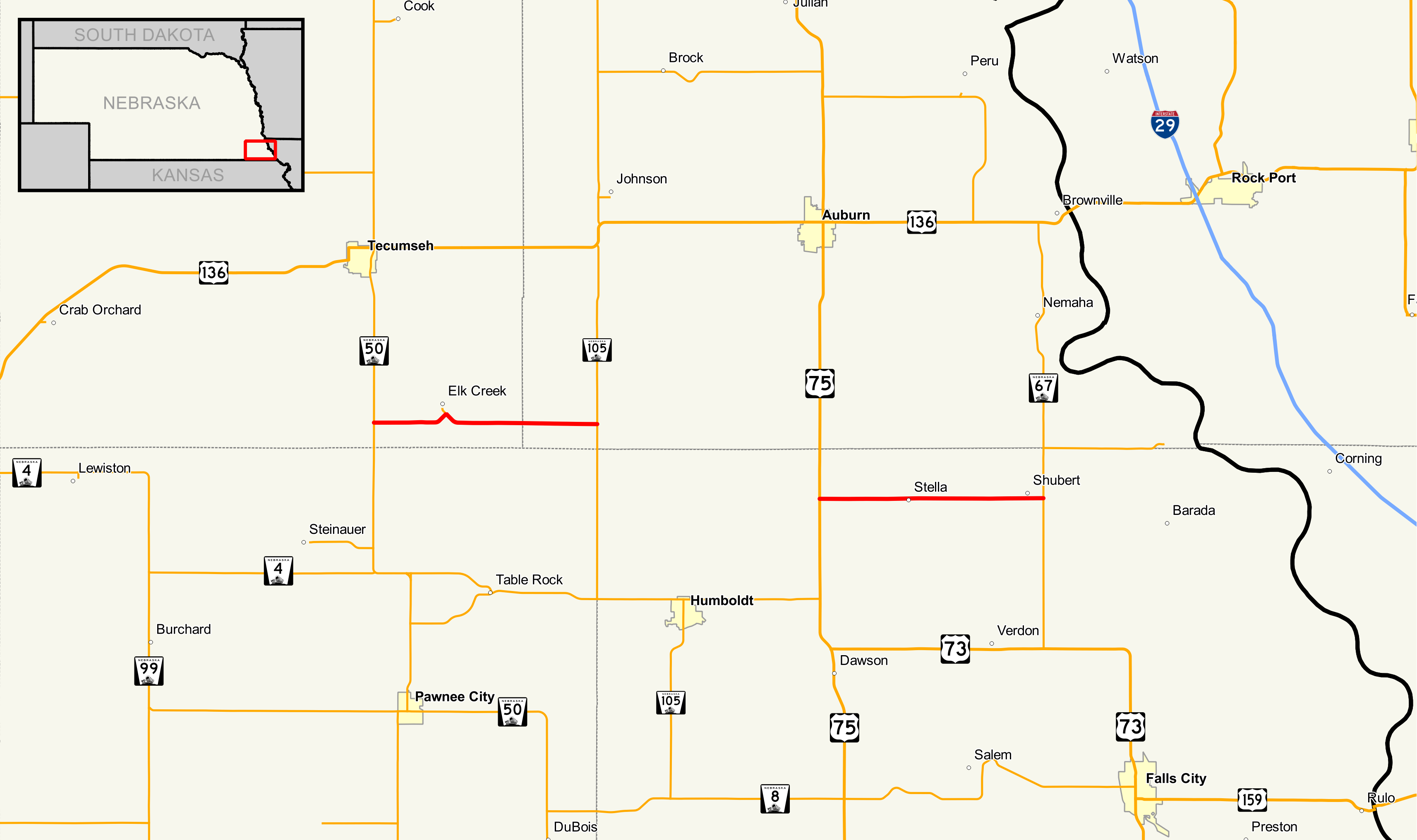
- Nebraska Highway 62 highlighted in red

Route information
- Maintained by NDOT
- Length: 18.21 mi (29.31 km)
- Existed: 1933–present

Western segment
- Length: 9.23 mi (14.85 km)
- West end: N-50 south of Tecumseh
- East end: N-105 east of Elk Creek

Eastern segment
- Length: 8.98 mi (14.45 km)
- West end: US 75 west of Stella
- East end: N-67 east of Shubert

Location
- Country: United States
- State: Nebraska
- Counties: Western segment: Johnson, Nemaha; Eastern segment: Richardson

Highway system
- Nebraska State Highway System; Interstate; US; State; Link; Spur; State Spurs; Recreation
← N-61	→ N-63

Nebraska Highway 62 is a highway in southeastern Nebraska. It is a discontinuous highway with two segments which combine for a length of 18 miles (29 km). The west terminus of the western segment of Nebraska Highway 62 is at Nebraska Highway 50 south of Tecumseh, while its eastern terminus is at Nebraska Highway 105. The west terminus of the eastern segment of Nebraska Highway 62 is at U.S. Highway 75 west of Stella, while its eastern terminus is at Nebraska Highway 67 east of Shubert.

== Route description ==
=== Western segment ===
The western segment of Nebraska Highway 62 begins at Nebraska Highway 50 south of Tecumseh. It goes east through farmland, crosses the Big Nemaha River and meets S-49B, a spur road into Elk Creek. It then continues east to Nebraska Highway 105 and ends in southwestern Nemaha County.

=== Eastern segment ===
The eastern segment of Nebraska Highway 62 begins at U.S. Highway 75 west of Stella. It continues east through farmland to Stella and then Shubert, and ends at Nebraska Highway 67.

== Major intersections ==
=== Western segment ===
County	Location	mi	km	Destinations	Notes
Johnson		0.00	0.00	N-50	Western terminus of western segment
Johnson	Elk Creek	3.03	4.88	S-49B north	
Nemaha		9.23	14.85	N-105	Eastern terminus of western segment
1.000 mi = 1.609 km; 1.000 km = 0.621 mi

=== Eastern segment ===
The entire route is in Richardson County.

Location	mi	km	Destinations	Notes
	21.23	34.17	US 75	Western terminus of eastern segment
Shubert	30.21	48.62	N-67	Eastern terminus of eastern segment
1.000 mi = 1.609 km; 1.000 km = 0.621 mi
