= Nemaha County, Nebraska =

County in Nebraska, United States

- County
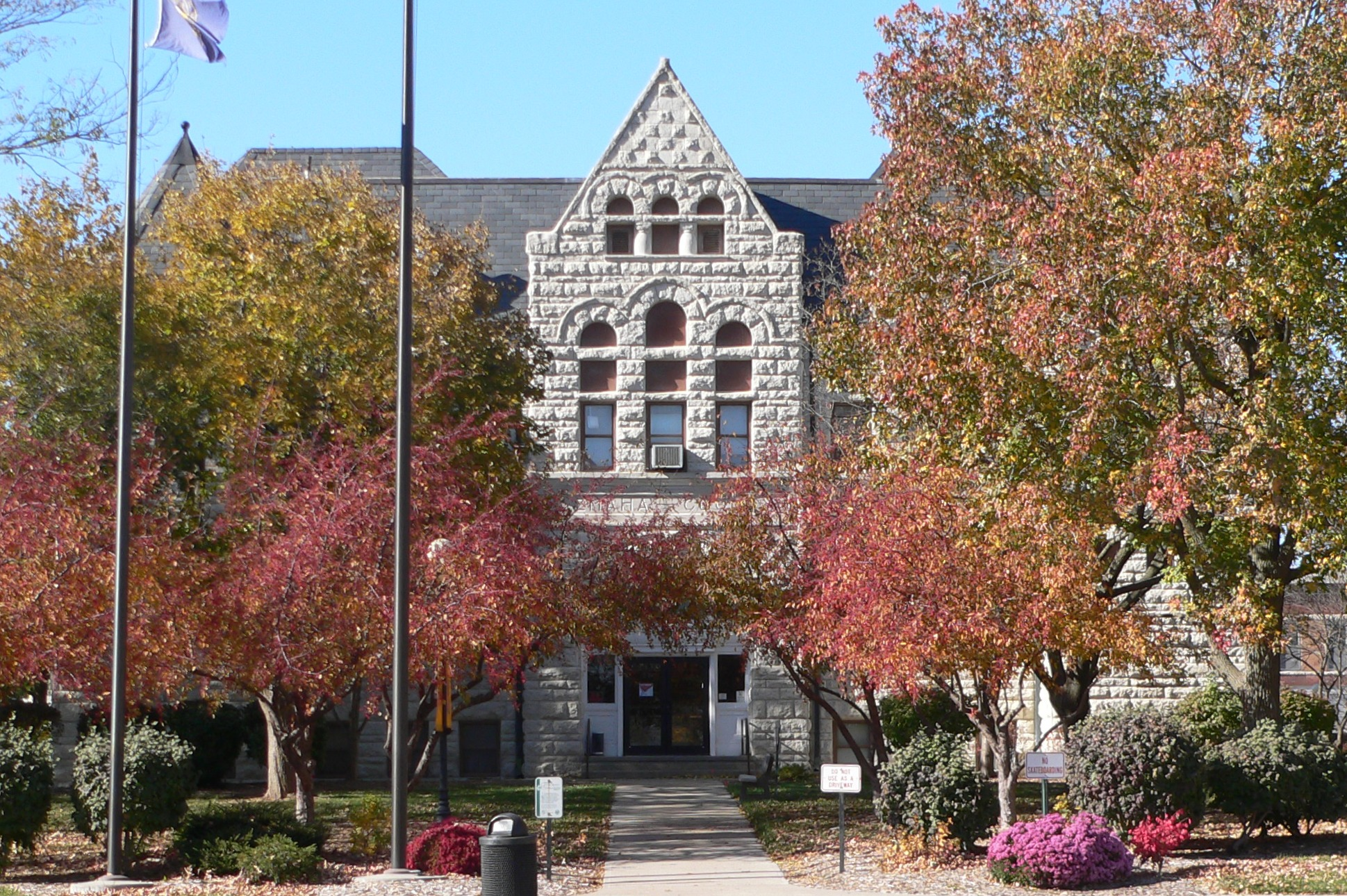
- Nemaha County Courthouse in Auburn

- Location within the U.S. state of Nebraska
- Coordinates: 40°23′N 95°51′W
- Country: United States
- State: Nebraska
- Founded: 1855
- Seat: Auburn
- Largest city: Auburn

Area
  - Total: 410 sq mi (1,100 km^{2})
  - Land: 407 sq mi (1,050 km^{2})
  - Water: 2.2 sq mi (5.7 km^{2}) 0.5%

Population (2020)
  - Total: 7,074
  - Estimate (2025): 7,102 ▲
  - Density: 17.2/sq mi (6.6/km^{2})
- Time zone: UTC−6 (Central)
  - Summer (DST): UTC−5 (CDT)
- Congressional district: 3rd
- Website: nemahacountyne.gov

Nemaha County is a county in the U.S. state of Nebraska. As of the 2020 United States census, the population was 7,074. Its county seat is Auburn.

In the Nebraska license plate system, Nemaha County is represented by the prefix 44 as it had the forty-fourth-largest number of vehicles registered in the county when the license plate system was established in 1922.

== History ==
The county forms the core of the Nemaha Half-Breed Reservation formed in the Fourth Treaty of Prairie du Chien in 1830 as land for the offspring of traders and Native Americans. The grounds of modern Indian Cave State Park mark where the county's first community, Saint Deroin, was founded in 1853 by members of the reservation as a trading post on the Missouri River. When white settlement was permitted in the Kansas–Nebraska Act of 1854, this area was part of Forney County (named for US cabinet member John W. Forney) which stretched along the Little Nemaha River from the Missouri River to west of Lincoln, Nebraska. In 1855 Nemaha County was formally founded with Brownville as its county seat. Johnson County, also founded in 1855, was initially administratively attached to Nemaha, but was organized as a stand-alone county in 1857.

Brownville was the biggest city in Nebraska at the time and several firsts occurred in the county including: in 1861 the first state normal school was founded at what today is Peru State College; Daniel Freeman filed the first claim under the Homestead Act of 1862 for land on January 1, 1863, at the Brownville land office.

The Nebraska State Fair was held in the county at Brownville in 1870–1871.

In 1883 the county seat was moved to Auburn.

In 1974 the Cooper Nuclear Station was commissioned south of Brownville.

== Geography ==
Nemaha County lies on the eastern edge of Nebraska. Its east boundary line abuts the west boundary line of the state of Missouri (across the Missouri River). Most of the county's eastern border follows the Missouri River bordering Atchison County, Missouri. In the county's extreme northeast corner, the border follows the river's former course, lying nearly two miles (3 km) east of the present-day channel. This de facto enclave is McKissick Island. The Nemaha River flows southeastward through the upper eastern portion of the county, discharging into the Missouri River below the village of Nemaha.

The county's terrain consists of low rolling hills, sloping eastward to the Missouri River valley. Much of the terrain is devoted to agriculture. The county has a total area of 410 square miles (1,100 km^{2}), of which 407 square miles (1,050 km^{2}) is land and 2.2 square miles (5.7 km^{2}) (0.5%) is water.

=== Major highways ===
- U.S. Highway 75
- U.S. Highway 136
- Nebraska Highway 62
- Nebraska Highway 67
- Nebraska Highway 105

=== Protected area ===
- Indian Cave State Park (part)

=== Adjacent counties ===
- Otoe County - north
- Atchison County, Missouri - east
- Holt County, Missouri - southeast
- Richardson County - south
- Pawnee County - southwest
- Johnson County - west

== Demographics ==
Historical population
Census	Pop.	Note	%±
1860	3,139		—
1870	7,593		141.9%
1880	10,451		37.6%
1890	12,930		23.7%
1900	14,952		15.6%
1910	13,095		−12.4%
1920	12,547		−4.2%
1930	12,356		−1.5%
1940	12,781		3.4%
1950	10,973		−14.1%
1960	9,099		−17.1%
1970	8,976		−1.4%
1980	8,367		−6.8%
1990	7,980		−4.6%
2000	7,576		−5.1%
2010	7,248		−4.3%
2020	7,074		−2.4%
2025 (est.)	7,102	▲	0.4%
US Decennial Census; 1790-1960 1900-1990; 1990-2000 2010-2013

=== 2020 census ===
As of the 2020 census, the county had a population of 7,074. The median age was 38.7 years. 23.1% of residents were under the age of 18 and 20.3% of residents were 65 years of age or older. For every 100 females there were 97.2 males, and for every 100 females age 18 and over there were 96.0 males age 18 and over.

The racial makeup of the county was 93.3% White, 0.9% Black or African American, 0.5% American Indian and Alaska Native, 0.5% Asian, 0.0% Native Hawaiian and Pacific Islander, 1.2% from some other race, and 3.6% from two or more races. Hispanic or Latino residents of any race comprised 2.9% of the population.

0.0% of residents lived in urban areas, while 100.0% lived in rural areas.

There were 2,814 households in the county, of which 27.5% had children under the age of 18 living with them and 25.0% had a female householder with no spouse or partner present. About 33.1% of all households were made up of individuals and 16.4% had someone living alone who was 65 years of age or older.

There were 3,312 housing units, of which 15.0% were vacant. Among occupied housing units, 72.1% were owner-occupied and 27.9% were renter-occupied. The homeowner vacancy rate was 2.9% and the rental vacancy rate was 12.5%.

=== 2000 census ===
As of the 2000 United States census there were 7,576 people, 3,047 households, and 1,980 families in the county. The population density was 18 people per square mile (6.9 people/km^{2}). There were 3,439 housing units at an average density of 8 units per square mile (3.1/km^{2}). The racial makeup of the county was 97.60% White, 0.36% Black or African American, 0.30% Native American, 0.59% Asian, 0.04% Pacific Islander, 0.37% from other races, and 0.74% from two or more races. 1.00% of the population were Hispanic or Latino of any race.

There were 3,047 households, out of which 29.50% had children under the age of 18 living with them, 55.00% were married couples living together, 7.20% had a female householder with no husband present, and 35.00% were non-families. 30.50% of all households were made up of individuals, and 16.20% had someone living alone who was 65 years of age or older. The average household size was 2.32 and the average family size was 2.91.

The county population contained 23.20% under the age of 18, 11.90% from 18 to 24, 23.90% from 25 to 44, 22.70% from 45 to 64, and 18.40% who were 65 years of age or older. The median age was 39 years. For every 100 females there were 93.30 males. For every 100 females age 18 and over, there were 92.00 males.

The median income for a household in the county was $32,588, and the median income for a family was $43,780. Males had a median income of $30,956 versus $19,263 for females. The per capita income for the county was $17,004. About 8.30% of families and 12.60% of the population were below the poverty line, including 13.20% of those under age 18 and 13.50% of those age 65 or over.

== Communities ==
=== Cities ===
- Auburn (county seat)
- Peru

=== Villages ===
- Brock
- Brownville
- Johnson
- Julian
- Nemaha

=== Unincorporated communities ===
- Glenrock
- Howe
- Rohrs

=== Ghost town ===
- St. Deroin

=== Precincts ===
Nemaha County has the following precincts (which are similar to townships)

- Aspinwall
- Bedford
- Benton
- Brownville
- Douglas
- Glen Rock
- Lafayette
- London
- McKissick Island
- Nemaha
- Peru
- St. Deroin
- Washington

== Politics ==
Nemaha County voters are reliably Republican. In only one national election since 1936 has the county selected the Democratic Party candidate (with that being 1964).

United States presidential election results for Nemaha County, Nebraska
Year	Republican		Democratic		Third party(ies)	
Year	No.	%	No.	%	No.	%
1880	1,473	63.00%	857	36.66%	8	0.34%
1884	1,690	57.74%	1,207	41.24%	30	1.02%
1888	1,427	51.59%	1,094	39.55%	245	8.86%
1892	1,105	40.96%	367	13.60%	1,226	45.44%
1896	1,449	42.33%	1,930	56.38%	44	1.29%
1900	1,783	48.88%	1,779	48.77%	86	2.36%
1904	1,946	60.64%	786	24.49%	477	14.86%
1908	1,583	47.30%	1,674	50.01%	90	2.69%
1912	672	22.50%	1,374	46.00%	941	31.50%
1916	1,438	45.23%	1,658	52.15%	83	2.61%
1920	2,888	64.02%	1,512	33.52%	111	2.46%
1924	2,378	48.97%	1,871	38.53%	607	12.50%
1928	3,777	68.08%	1,767	31.85%	4	0.07%
1932	2,075	36.35%	3,593	62.94%	41	0.72%
1936	2,720	43.86%	3,459	55.77%	23	0.37%
1940	3,817	59.96%	2,549	40.04%	0	0.00%
1944	3,267	64.67%	1,785	35.33%	0	0.00%
1948	2,413	58.85%	1,687	41.15%	0	0.00%
1952	3,735	72.29%	1,432	27.71%	0	0.00%
1956	3,141	68.66%	1,434	31.34%	0	0.00%
1960	3,031	68.76%	1,377	31.24%	0	0.00%
1964	1,936	48.16%	2,084	51.84%	0	0.00%
1968	2,290	63.47%	1,023	28.35%	295	8.18%
1972	2,600	74.10%	909	25.90%	0	0.00%
1976	2,093	59.06%	1,406	39.67%	45	1.27%
1980	2,695	68.91%	930	23.78%	286	7.31%
1984	2,752	72.55%	1,004	26.47%	37	0.98%
1988	2,295	60.60%	1,457	38.47%	35	0.92%
1992	1,696	44.01%	1,110	28.80%	1,048	27.19%
1996	1,888	51.94%	1,232	33.89%	515	14.17%
2000	2,177	64.62%	1,063	31.55%	129	3.83%
2004	2,595	69.85%	1,066	28.69%	54	1.45%
2008	2,134	61.43%	1,240	35.69%	100	2.88%
2012	2,012	62.60%	1,128	35.10%	74	2.30%
2016	2,116	66.94%	785	24.83%	260	8.23%
2020	2,428	70.75%	921	26.84%	83	2.42%
2024	2,443	71.04%	915	26.61%	81	2.36%

== Education ==
School districts include:

- Auburn Public Schools
- Falls City Public Schools
- Humboldt Table Rock Steinauer Public Schools
- Johnson-Brock Public Schools
- Johnson County Central Public Schools
- Nebraska City Public Schools

== See also ==
- National Register of Historic Places listings in Nemaha County, Nebraska
- Nemaha Half-Breed Reservation
