= Glenrock, Nebraska =

Unincorporated community in Nebraska, United States

- Unincorporated community
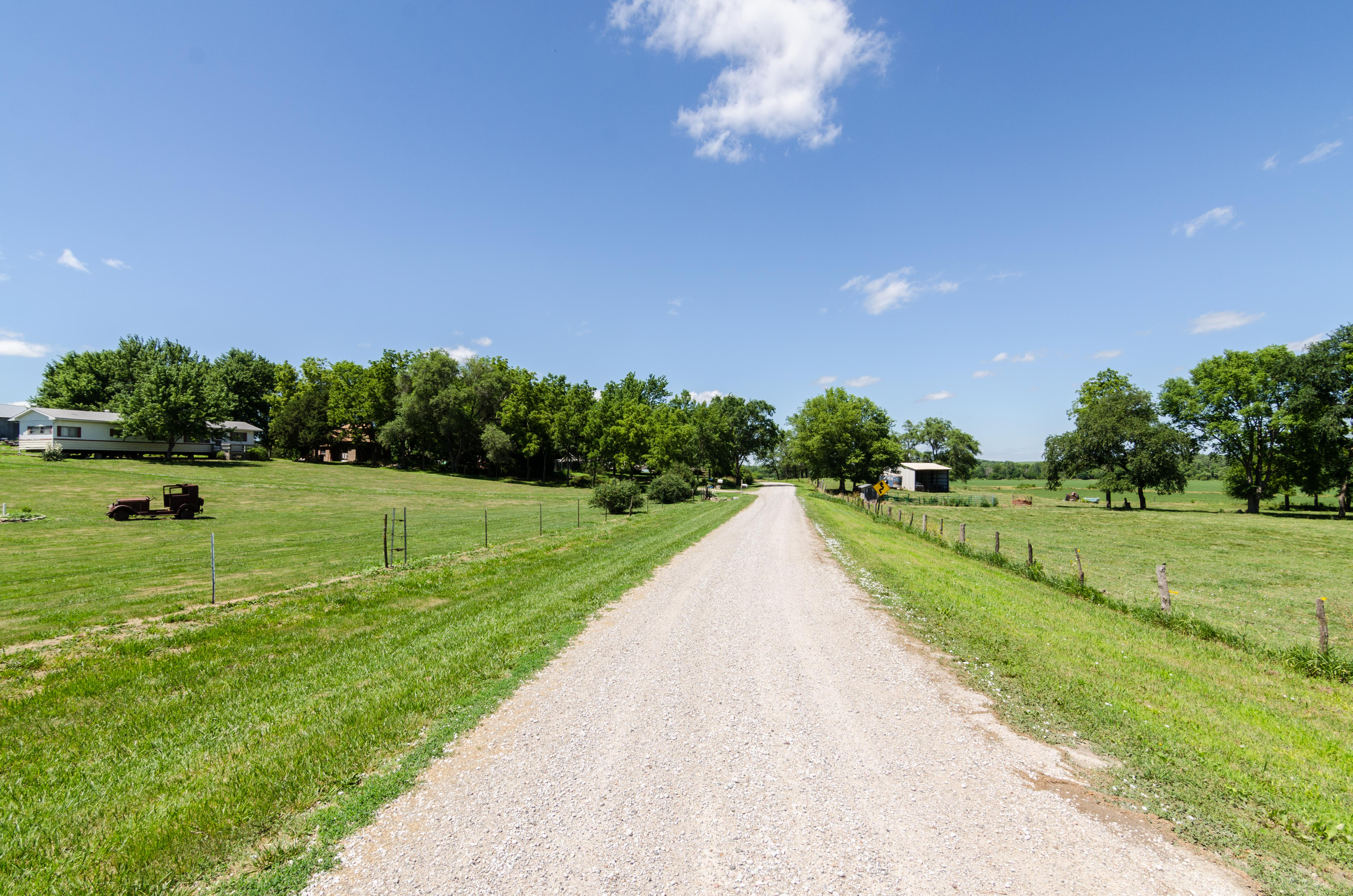
- A Gravel Street in Glenrock

- Location within the state of Nebraska
- Coordinates: 40°26′37″N 95°53′28″W
- Country: United States
- State: Nebraska
- County: Nemaha
- Elevation: 955 ft (291 m)
- Time zone: UTC-6 (Central (CST))
  - Summer (DST): UTC-5 (CDT)
- ZIP codes: 68305
- GNIS feature ID: 829546

Glenrock (also spelled Glen Rock) is an unincorporated community in Nemaha County, Nebraska, United States.

== History ==
A post office was established at Glenrock in 1859, and remained in operation until it was discontinued in 1929. The community was named on account of rock quarries nearby.
