= Humboldt Table Rock Steinauer Public Schools =

School district in Nebraska, United States

Coordinates: 40°11′25″N 96°10′46″W

Humboldt Table Rock Steinauer Public Schools is a school district headquartered in Humboldt, Nebraska, United States.

Within Richardson County, it contains the communities of Humboldt, Dawson, Stella, and Shubert, as well as portions of Barada. In Pawnee County, it contains Steinauer and Table Rock. In Nemaha County it includes Nemaha. The district extends into Johnson County.

== History ==
Humboldt School District, and Table Rock Steinauer Schools both merged into Humboldt Table Rock Steinauer School district on June 1, 2003.

It merged with parts of the former Dawson-Verdon School District in 2004, adding the village of Dawson to the district.

On January 1, 2009 the Southeast Nebraska Consolidated Public Schools became part of the Humboldt Table Rock Steinauer School District, thus adding the communities of Stella, Shubert, and Nemaha, and becoming one of the largest school districts (by area) in the state.

The district receives some services from Educational Service Unit #4.

== Schools ==
=== High school ===
Humboldt Table Rock Steinauer High School (HTRS) is located in Humboldt. It has approximately 400 students (K-12). HTRS won the Nebraska Mock Trial State Championship on December 5, 2007.

== See also ==
- List of school districts in Nebraska
