= Dawson, Nebraska =

Village in Richardson County, Nebraska, United States

- Village
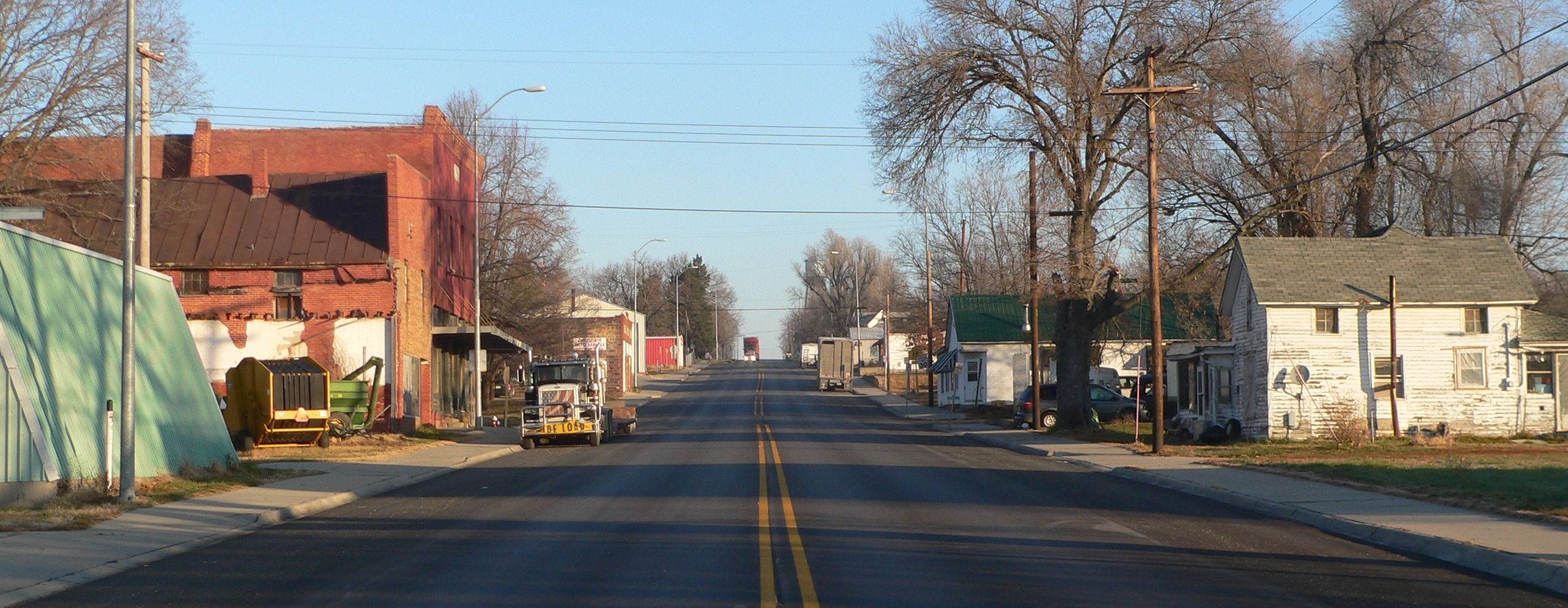
- Downtown Dawson: Ridge Street (U.S. Route 75), November 2012

- Location of Dawson, Nebraska
- Coordinates: 40°07′50″N 95°49′48″W
- Country: United States
- State: Nebraska
- County: Richardson

Area
  - Total: 0.22 sq mi (0.56 km^{2})
  - Land: 0.21 sq mi (0.55 km^{2})
  - Water: 0 sq mi (0.00 km^{2})
- Elevation: 968 ft (295 m)

Population (2020)
  - Total: 148
  - Estimate (2021): 146
  - Density: 700/sq mi (270/km^{2})
- Time zone: UTC-6 (Central (CST))
  - Summer (DST): UTC-5 (CDT)
- ZIP code: 68337
- Area code: 402
- FIPS code: 31-12420
- GNIS feature ID: 2398690

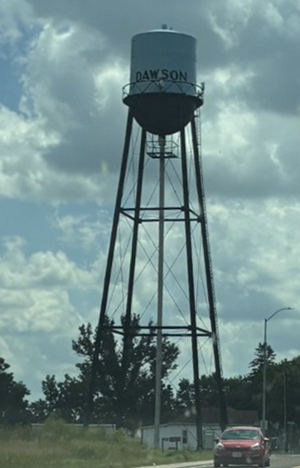
Water tower in Dawson

Dawson is a village in Richardson County, Nebraska, United States. The population was 148 at the 2020 census.

== History ==
Dawson was originally known as Noraville, and under the latter name was platted in 1872 when the Atchison and Nebraska Railroad was extended to that point. The name Noraville caused considerable strife among the town's residents, who insisted on calling their town Dawson, after Joshua Dawson, an early settler.

== Geography ==
According to the United States Census Bureau, the village has a total area of 0.21 square miles (0.54 km^{2}), all land.

== Demographics ==
Historical population
Census	Pop.	Note	%±
1890	153		—
1900	322		110.5%
1910	340		5.6%
1920	351		3.2%
1930	389		10.8%
1940	394		1.3%
1950	309		−21.6%
1960	263		−14.9%
1970	251		−4.6%
1980	215		−14.3%
1990	157		−27.0%
2000	209		33.1%
2010	146		−30.1%
2020	148		1.4%
2021 (est.)	146	▼	−1.4%
U.S. Decennial Census

=== 2010 census ===
As of the census of 2010, there were 146 people, 68 households, and 44 families living in the village. The population density was 695.2 inhabitants per square mile (268.4/km^{2}). There were 89 housing units at an average density of 423.8 per square mile (163.6/km^{2}). The racial makeup of the village was 100.0% White. Hispanic or Latino of any race were 2.1% of the population.

There were 68 households, of which 26.5% had children under the age of 18 living with them, 57.4% were married couples living together, 4.4% had a female householder with no husband present, 2.9% had a male householder with no wife present, and 35.3% were non-families. 27.9% of all households were made up of individuals, and 13.3% had someone living alone who was 65 years of age or older. The average household size was 2.15 and the average family size was 2.59.

The median age in the village was 52 years. 16.4% of residents were under the age of 18; 5.4% were between the ages of 18 and 24; 19.2% were from 25 to 44; 37% were from 45 to 64; and 21.9% were 65 years of age or older. The gender makeup of the village was 54.1% male and 45.9% female.

=== 2000 census ===
As of the census of 2000, there were 209 people, 84 households, and 56 families living in the village. The population density was 976.9 inhabitants per square mile (377.2/km^{2}). There were 92 housing units at an average density of 430.0 per square mile (166.0/km^{2}). The racial makeup of the village was 98.56% White, 0.48% from other races, and 0.96% from two or more races. Hispanic or Latino of any race were 1.91% of the population.

There were 84 households, out of which 33.3% had children under the age of 18 living with them, 54.8% were married couples living together, 7.1% had a female householder with no husband present, and 33.3% were non-families. 29.8% of all households were made up of individuals, and 13.1% had someone living alone who was 65 years of age or older. The average household size was 2.49 and the average family size was 3.04.

In the village, the population was spread out, with 28.7% under the age of 18, 10.5% from 18 to 24, 24.4% from 25 to 44, 23.4% from 45 to 64, and 12.9% who were 65 years of age or older. The median age was 36 years. For every 100 females, there were 106.9 males. For every 100 females age 18 and over, there were 96.1 males.

As of 2000 the median income for a household in the village was $37,500, and the median income for a family was $39,375. Males had a median income of $26,875 versus $25,781 for females. The per capita income for the village was $13,415. None of the families and 3.2% of the population were living below the poverty line, including no under eighteens and 15.4% of those over 64.

== Education ==
Its school district is Humboldt Table Rock Steinauer Public Schools.

Dawson-Verdon Public Schools was its school district until 2004.

== See also ==
- List of municipalities in Nebraska
