= Indian Cave State Park =

Park in Nebraska, USA

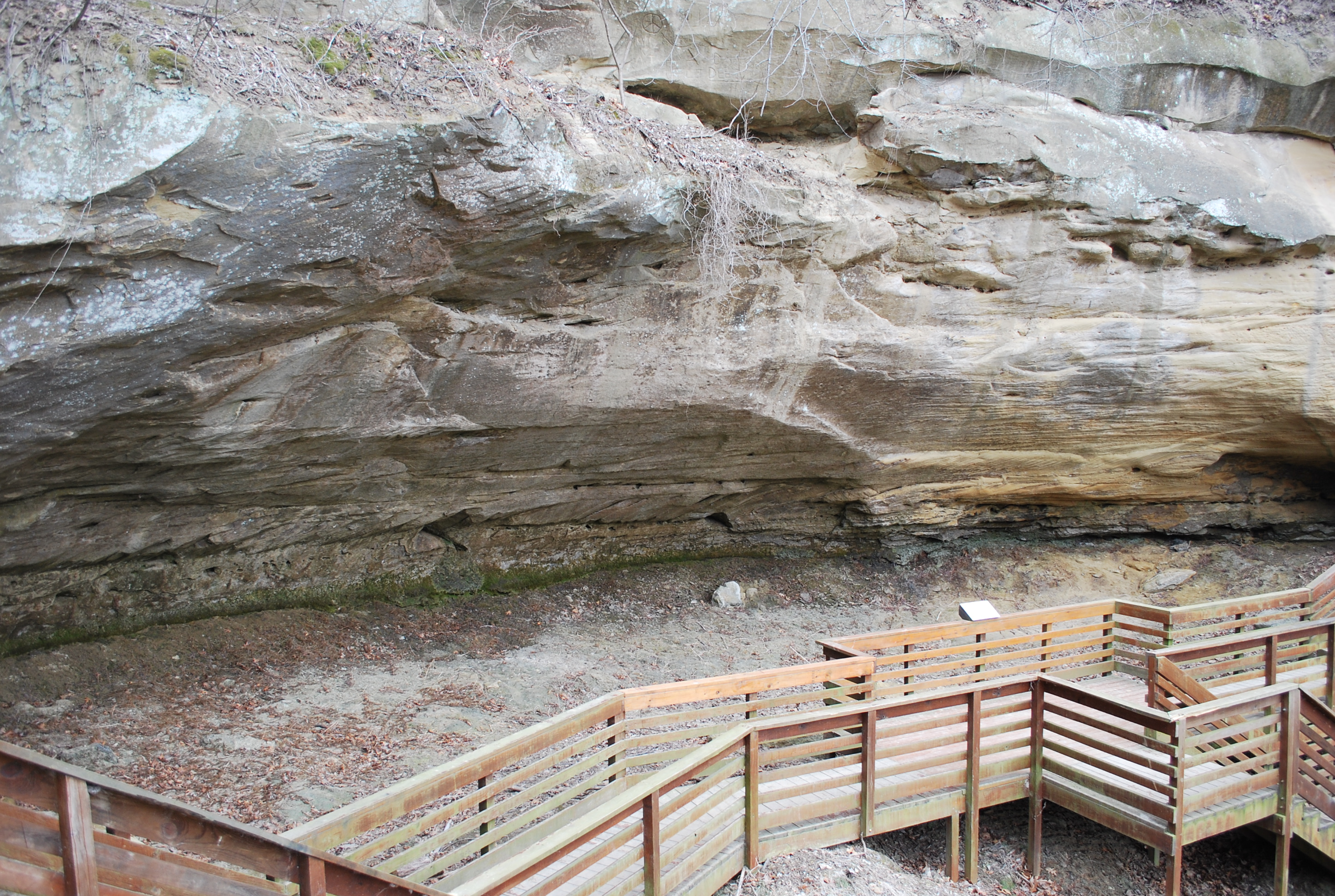
- Cave viewing area

- Location within Nebraska
- Location: Nemaha & Richardson counties, Nebraska, United States
- Nearest town: Shubert, Nebraska
- Coordinates: 40°15′32″N 95°33′22″W
- Area: 3,399.7 acres (1,375.8 ha)
- Elevation: 1,115 ft (340 m)
- Established: 1962
- Administrator: Nebraska Game and Parks Commission
- Designation: Nebraska state park
- Website: Official website

Indian Cave State Park is a public recreation and historic preservation area covering nearly 3,400 acres (1,400 ha) along the Missouri River in southeast Nebraska. The state park preserves a cave with prehistoric petroglyphs as well as the partially reconstructed village of St. Deroin established in 1853 as part of the former Nemaha Half-Breed Reservation. The state park lies ten miles (16 km) south of Brownville and eight miles (13 km) east of Shubert, straddling the county line between Nemaha and Richardson counties.

Some of the carvings within Indian Cave are believed to be several thousand years old, but their exact period and cultural affiliations are undetermined. The park offers 22 miles of hiking and biking trails, 16 miles of equestrian trails, camping, picnic facilities, fishing areas, and boating access to the Missouri River.
