= Nemaha, Nebraska =

- Village
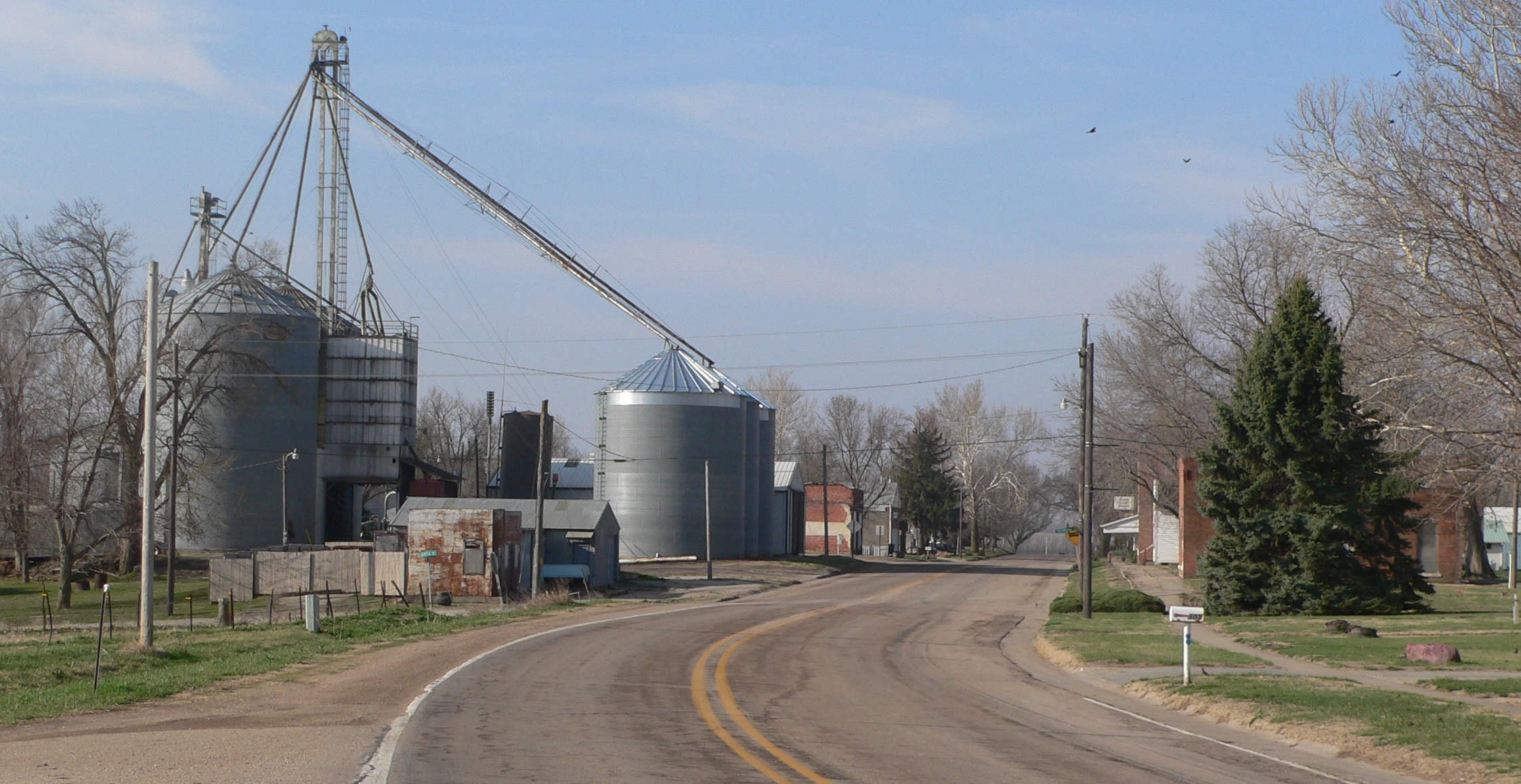
- Nemaha, seen from the north along Nebraska Highway 67

- Location of Nemaha, Nebraska
- Coordinates: 40°20′20″N 95°40′31″W
- Country: United States
- State: Nebraska
- County: Nemaha

Area
  - Total: 0.31 sq mi (0.79 km^{2})
  - Land: 0.31 sq mi (0.79 km^{2})
  - Water: 0 sq mi (0.00 km^{2})
- Elevation: 912 ft (278 m)

Population (2020)
  - Total: 116
  - Estimate (2021): 115
  - Density: 380/sq mi (150/km^{2})
- Time zone: UTC-6 (Central (CST))
  - Summer (DST): UTC-5 (CDT)
- ZIP code: 68414
- Area code: 402
- FIPS code: 31-33950
- GNIS feature ID: 0831589

Nemaha is a village in Nemaha County, Nebraska, United States. The population was 116 at the 2020 census.

== History ==
Nemaha was incorporated as a village in 1856. It was named from the Nemaha River.

== Geography ==
Nemaha is located at 40°20′20″N 95°40′31″W (40.338806, -95.675274). According to the United States Census Bureau, the village has a total area of 0.30 square miles (0.78 km^{2}), all land.

== Demographics ==
Historical population
Census	Pop.	Note	%±
1900	400		—
1910	325		−18.7%
1920	351		8.0%
1930	296		−15.7%
1940	379		28.0%
1950	288		−24.0%
1960	232		−19.4%
1970	207		−10.8%
1980	209		1.0%
1990	188		−10.0%
2000	178		−5.3%
2010	149		−16.3%
2020	114		−23.5%
2021 (est.)	115	▲	0.9%
U.S. Decennial Census

=== 2010 census ===
As of the census of 2010, there were 149 people, 71 households, and 36 families residing in the village. The population density was 496.7 inhabitants per square mile (191.8/km^{2}). There were 90 housing units at an average density of 300.0 per square mile (115.8/km^{2}). The racial makeup of the village was 99.3% White and 0.7% African American.

There were 71 households, of which 22.5% had children under the age of 18 living with them, 40.8% were married couples living together, 5.6% had a female householder with no husband present, 4.2% had a male householder with no wife present, and 49.3% were non-families. 43.7% of all households were made up of individuals, and 21.2% had someone living alone who was 65 years of age or older. The average household size was 2.10 and the average family size was 2.86.

The median age in the village was 46.2 years. 22.1% of residents were under the age of 18; 6.7% were between the ages of 18 and 24; 19.5% were from 25 to 44; 28.9% were from 45 to 64; and 22.8% were 65 years of age or older. The gender makeup of the village was 51.7% male and 48.3% female.

=== 2000 census ===
As of the census of 2000, there were 178 people, 76 households, and 51 families residing in the village. The population density was 576.0 inhabitants per square mile (222.4/km^{2}). There were 91 housing units at an average density of 294.5 per square mile (113.7/km^{2}). The racial makeup of the village was 98.88% White and 1.12% Asian. Hispanic or Latino of any race were 0.56% of the population.

There were 76 households, out of which 27.6% had children under the age of 18 living with them, 56.6% were married couples living together, 6.6% had a female householder with no husband present, and 31.6% were non-families. 30.3% of all households were made up of individuals, and 23.7% had someone living alone who was 65 years of age or older. The average household size was 2.34 and the average family size was 2.88.

In the village, the population was spread out, with 23.0% under the age of 18, 5.1% from 18 to 24, 21.9% from 25 to 44, 30.3% from 45 to 64, and 19.7% who were 65 years of age or older. The median age was 44 years. For every 100 females, there were 102.3 males. For every 100 females age 18 and over, there were 101.5 males.

The median income for a household in the village was $29,375, and the median income for a family was $35,938. Males had a median income of $31,563 versus $23,125 for females. The per capita income for the village was $13,409. About 6.8% of families and 9.3% of the population were below the poverty line, including 11.5% of those under the age of eighteen and 11.1% of those 65 or over.

== Education ==
The vast majority of Nemaha is in the Humboldt Table Rock Steinauer School District. Some blocks are instead in Auburn Public Schools.

Nemaha was previously in Southeast Nebraska Consolidated Schools. On January 1, 2009, it merged into the Humboldt Table Rock Steinauer School District.

== Notable person ==
- Lunsford E. Oliver, former major general who commanded the 5th Armored Division during World War II.
