= Johnson, Nebraska =

Village in Nemaha County, Nebraska, United States

- Village
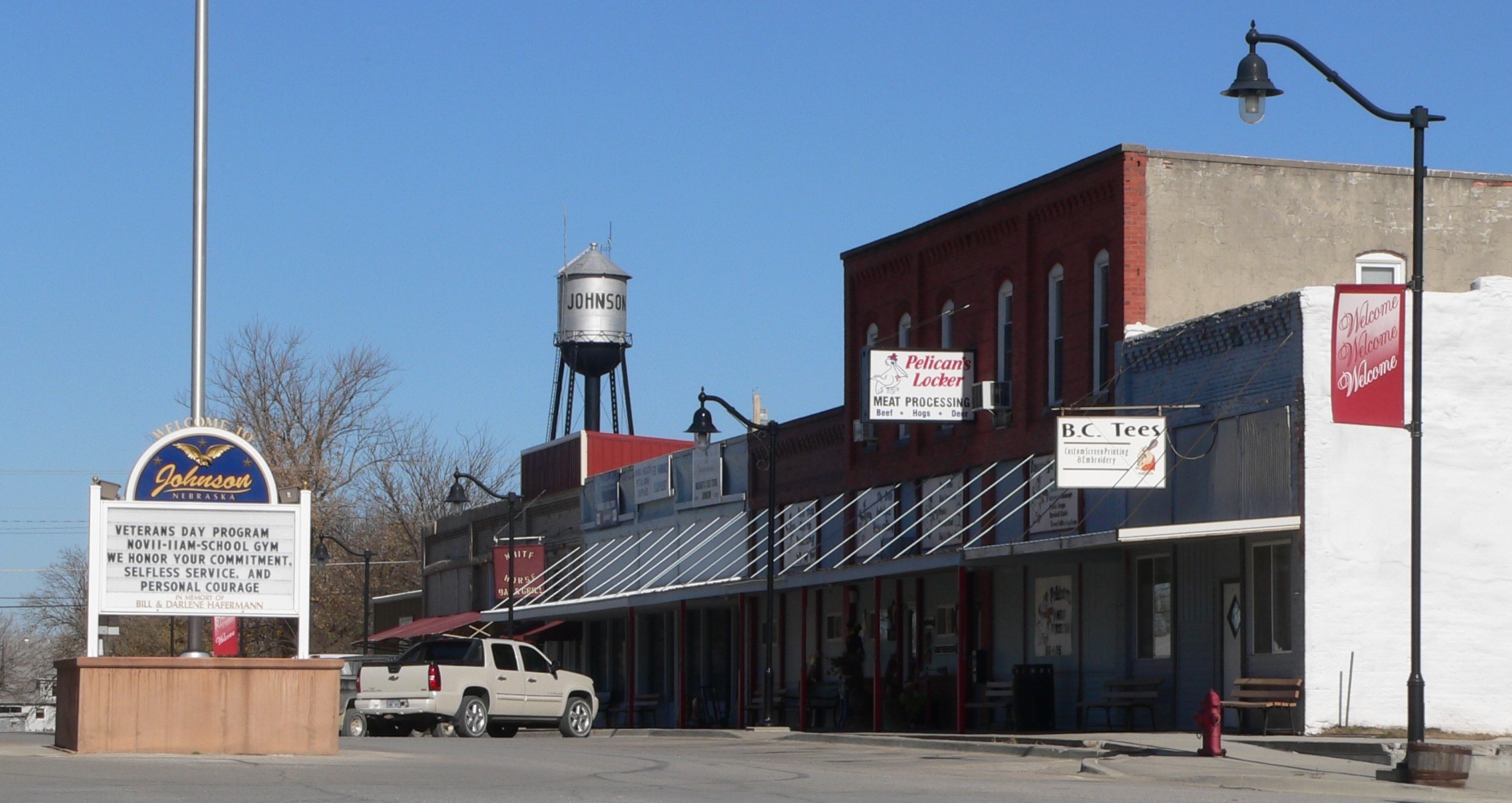
- Downtown Johnson: 2nd and Main, November 2010

- Location of Johnson, Nebraska
- Coordinates: 40°24′41″N 95°59′55″W
- Country: United States
- State: Nebraska
- County: Nemaha

Area
  - Total: 0.22 sq mi (0.57 km^{2})
  - Land: 0.22 sq mi (0.57 km^{2})
  - Water: 0 sq mi (0.00 km^{2})
- Elevation: 1,240 ft (378 m)

Population (2020)
  - Total: 313
  - Estimate (2021): 313
  - Density: 1,400/sq mi (550/km^{2})
- Time zone: UTC-6 (Central (CST))
  - Summer (DST): UTC-5 (CDT)
- ZIP code: 68378
- Area code: 402
- FIPS code: 31-24670
- GNIS feature ID: 0835482

Johnson is a village in Nemaha County, Nebraska, United States. The population was 313 at the 2020 census.

== History ==
The first settlement at Johnson was made in the 1860s. Johnson was platted in 1881 when the railroad was extended to that point. The village was named for Julius A. Johnson, the original owner of the town site.

== Geography ==
Johnson is located at 40°24′41″N 95°59′55″W (40.411250, -95.998665).

According to the United States Census Bureau, the village has a total area of 0.18 square miles (0.47 km^{2}), all land.

== Demographics ==
Historical population
Census	Pop.	Note	%±
1890	234		—
1900	352		50.4%
1910	273		−22.4%
1920	255		−6.6%
1930	238		−6.7%
1940	301		26.5%
1950	262		−13.0%
1960	304		16.0%
1970	350		15.1%
1980	341		−2.6%
1990	323		−5.3%
2000	280		−13.3%
2010	328		17.1%
2020	309		−5.8%
2021 (est.)	313	▲	1.3%
U.S. Decennial Census

=== 2010 census ===
As of the census of 2010, there were 328 people, 151 households, and 96 families residing in the village. The population density was 1,822.2 inhabitants per square mile (703.6/km^{2}). There were 169 housing units at an average density of 938.9 per square mile (362.5/km^{2}). The racial makeup of the village was 96.0% White, 0.3% Native American, 0.3% Asian, 1.5% from other races, and 1.8% from two or more races. Hispanic or Latino of any race were 3.7% of the population.

There were 151 households, of which 28.5% had children under the age of 18 living with them, 49.7% were married couples living together, 12.6% had a female householder with no husband present, 1.3% had a male householder with no wife present, and 36.4% were non-families. 34.4% of all households were made up of individuals, and 24.5% had someone living alone who was 65 years of age or older. The average household size was 2.17 and the average family size was 2.79.

The median age in the village was 40.8 years. 25.3% of residents were under the age of 18; 6.5% were between the ages of 18 and 24; 21.1% were from 25 to 44; 22.2% were from 45 to 64; and 25% were 65 years of age or older. The gender makeup of the village was 43.3% male and 56.7% female.

=== 2000 census ===
As of the census of 2000, there were 280 people, 150 households, and 70 families residing in the village. The population density was 1,583.6 inhabitants per square mile (611.4/km^{2}). There were 169 housing units at an average density of 955.8 per square mile (369.0/km^{2}). The racial makeup of the village was 97.86% White, 0.71% Native American, 0.36% Asian, and 1.07% from two or more races. Hispanic or Latino of any race were 0.36% of the population.

There were 150 households, out of which 19.3% had children under the age of 18 living with them, 41.3% were married couples living together, 4.7% had a female householder with no husband present, and 52.7% were non-families. 49.3% of all households were made up of individuals, and 32.0% had someone living alone who was 65 years of age or older. The average household size was 1.87 and the average family size was 2.72.

In the village, the population was spread out, with 17.9% under the age of 18, 7.9% from 18 to 24, 21.4% from 25 to 44, 22.1% from 45 to 64, and 30.7% who were 65 years of age or older. The median age was 47 years. For every 100 females, there were 77.2 males. For every 100 females age 18 and over, there were 72.9 males.

The median income for a household in the village was $25,833, and the median income for a family was $48,438. Males had a median income of $31,667 versus $20,833 for females. The per capita income for the village was $19,377. About 4.2% of families and 8.9% of the population were below the poverty line, including 1.9% of those under the age of eighteen and 18.0% of those 65 or over.

== Notable person ==
- Bill Lee, overdub singer whose voice was used instead of Christopher Plummer's in the film version of The Sound of Music

== See also ==
- List of municipalities in Nebraska
