= Stella, Nebraska =

Village in Richardson County, Nebraska, United States

- Village
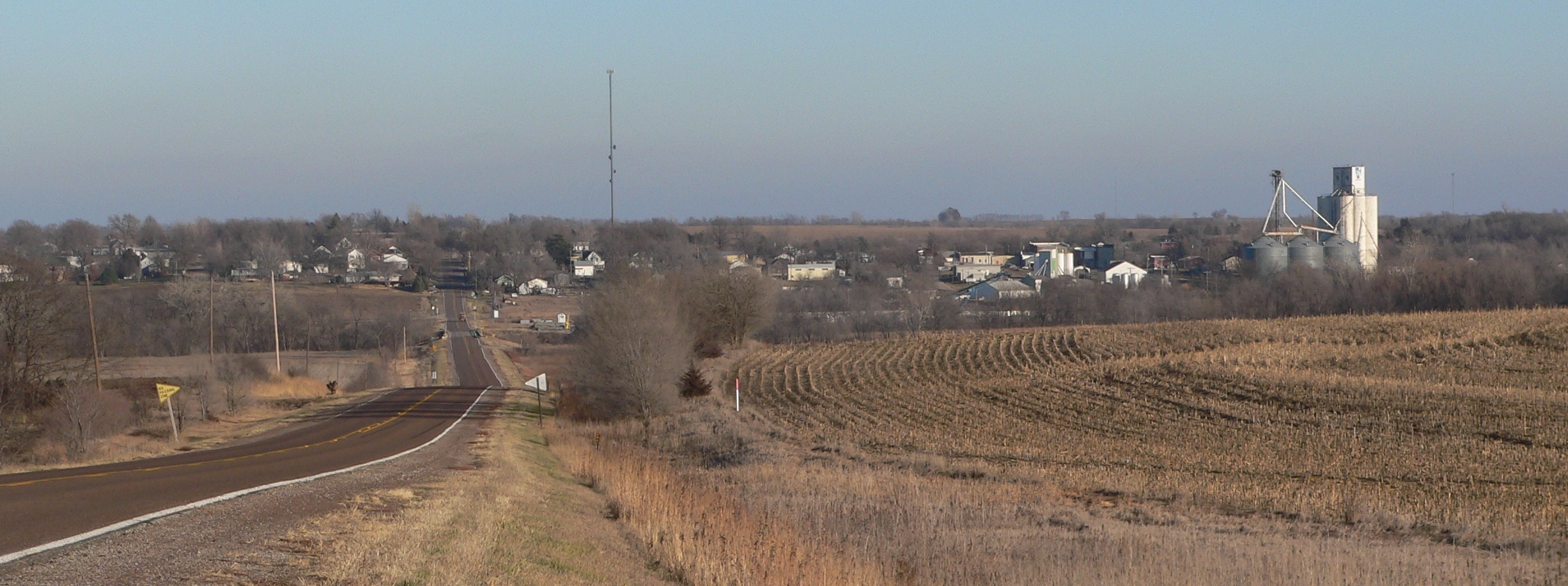
- Stella, seen from the west along Nebraska Highway 62, December 2012

- Location of Stella, Nebraska
- Coordinates: 40°13′56″N 95°46′24″W
- Country: United States
- State: Nebraska
- County: Richardson

Area
  - Total: 0.18 sq mi (0.46 km^{2})
  - Land: 0.18 sq mi (0.46 km^{2})
  - Water: 0 sq mi (0.00 km^{2})
- Elevation: 1,037 ft (316 m)

Population (2020)
  - Total: 150
  - Estimate (2021): 148
  - Density: 840/sq mi (330/km^{2})
- Time zone: UTC-6 (Central (CST))
  - Summer (DST): UTC-5 (CDT)
- ZIP code: 68442
- Area code: 402
- FIPS code: 31-47115
- GNIS feature ID: 2399894

Stella is a village in Richardson County, Nebraska, United States. The population was 150 at the 2020 census.

== History ==
The earliest settlers in the Stella area arrived in about 1855. An August 1881 public meeting of local farmers led to an arrangement for the Missouri Pacific Railroad to be extended to that point. Stella was platted the same year, and was named for Stella Clark, the daughter of the original owner of the town site. The track reached Stella in December 1881 and a station building was raised on January 7, 1882.

The village was incorporated in 1882 and grew quickly. By fall 1882 there were 25 business firms in town. A 56-page "Souvenir" of the Stella Press was issued on April 1, 1901, recounting the steady growth of the town to that point, which proved to be the peak of the town population. By that time there were five churches: the Baptist, Methodist, Christian, Lutheran, and Church of Christ Scientist. Residents had a choice of nine lodges and a number of social organizations. The school commenced in 1884, a water system was begun in 1887, an opera house was built in 1898, telephones were introduced in 1899, and an electrical system was in the planning stage in 1901. Detailed biographical sketches of more than 200 local families were included in the "Souvenir."

== Geography ==
According to the United States Census Bureau, the village has a total area of 0.18 square miles (0.47 km^{2}), all land.

== Demographics ==
Historical population
Census	Pop.	Note	%±
1890	399		—
1900	498		24.8%
1910	430		−13.7%
1920	449		4.4%
1930	385		−14.3%
1940	396		2.9%
1950	324		−18.2%
1960	262		−19.1%
1970	282		7.6%
1980	289		2.5%
1990	248		−14.2%
2000	220		−11.3%
2010	152		−30.9%
2020	145		−4.6%
2021 (est.)	148	▲	2.1%
U.S. Decennial Census

=== 2010 census ===
As of the census of 2010, there were 152 people, 78 households, and 51 families residing in the village. The population density was 844.4 inhabitants per square mile (326.0/km^{2}). There were 98 housing units at an average density of 544.4 per square mile (210.2/km^{2}). The racial makeup of the village was 98.7% White, 0.7% Asian, and 0.7% from two or more races. Hispanic or Latino of any race were 0.7% of the population.

There were 78 households, of which 15.4% had children under the age of 18 living with them, 55.1% were married couples living together, 5.1% had a female householder with no husband present, 5.1% had a male householder with no wife present, and 34.6% were non-families. 32.1% of all households were made up of individuals, and 15.4% had someone living alone who was 65 years of age or older. The average household size was 1.95 and the average family size was 2.37.

The median age in the village was 56 years. 12.5% of residents were under the age of 18; 6.5% were between the ages of 18 and 24; 12.5% were from 25 to 44; 42.2% were from 45 to 64; and 26.3% were 65 years of age or older. The gender makeup of the village was 50.0% male and 50.0% female.

=== 2000 census ===
As of the census of 2000, there were 220 people, 98 households, and 64 families residing in the village. The population density was 1,249.3 inhabitants per square mile (482.4/km^{2}). There were 106 housing units at an average density of 602.0 per square mile (232.4/km^{2}). The racial makeup of the village was 98.18% White, 0.91% Native American, and 0.91% from two or more races. Hispanic or Latino of any race were 2.27% of the population.

There were 98 households, out of which 21.4% had children under the age of 18 living with them, 56.1% were married couples living together, 8.2% had a female householder with no husband present, and 33.7% were non-families. 29.6% of all households were made up of individuals, and 18.4% had someone living alone who was 65 years of age or older. The average household size was 2.24 and the average family size was 2.77.

In the village, the population was spread out, with 19.5% under the age of 18, 7.3% from 18 to 24, 22.3% from 25 to 44, 33.2% from 45 to 64, and 17.7% who were 65 years of age or older. The median age was 46 years. For every 100 females, there were 94.7 males. For every 100 females age 18 and over, there were 88.3 males.

As of 2000 the median income for a household in the village was $27,159, and the median income for a family was $44,375. Males had a median income of $24,306 versus $20,139 for females. The per capita income for the village was $16,839. About 4.6% of families and 9.0% of the population were below the poverty line, including 11.5% of those under the age of eighteen and 15.6% of those 65 or over.

== Education ==
Its school district is Humboldt Table Rock Steinauer Public Schools.

Southeast Nebraska Consolidated Schools formerly operated a school in Stella. On January 1, 2009, it merged into the Humboldt Table Rock Steinauer School District.

== See also ==
- List of municipalities in Nebraska
