= Steinauer, Nebraska =

- Village
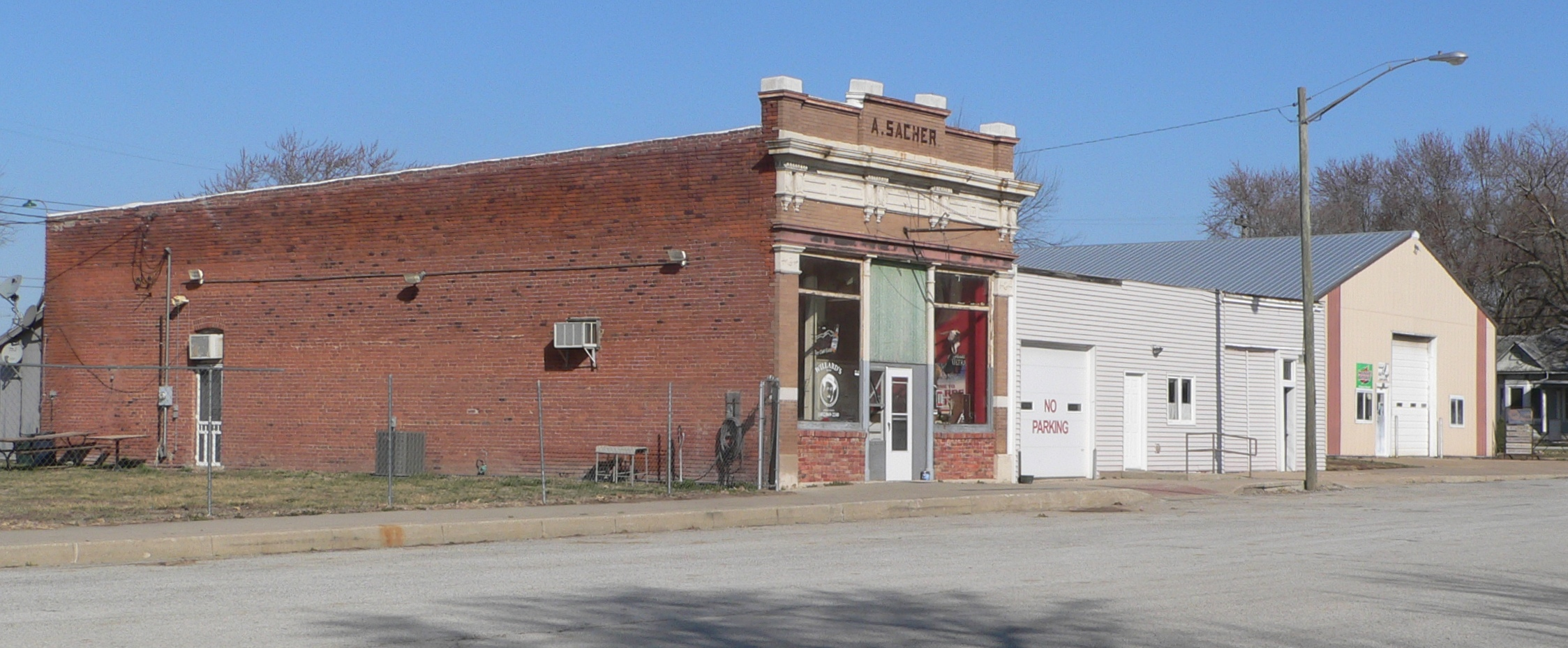
- Downtown Steinauer: west side of Main Street.

- Location of Steinauer, Nebraska
- Coordinates: 40°12′26″N 96°13′58″W
- Country: United States
- State: Nebraska
- County: Pawnee

Area
  - Total: 0.14 sq mi (0.35 km^{2})
  - Land: 0.14 sq mi (0.35 km^{2})
  - Water: 0 sq mi (0.00 km^{2})
- Elevation: 1,211 ft (369 m)

Population (2020)
  - Total: 59
  - Estimate (2021): 59
  - Density: 440/sq mi (170/km^{2})
- Time zone: UTC-6 (Central (CST))
  - Summer (DST): UTC-5 (CDT)
- ZIP code: 68441
- Area code: 402
- FIPS code: 31-47080
- GNIS feature ID: 2399893

Steinauer, locally pronounced "Steener", is a village in Pawnee County, Nebraska, United States. The population was 59 at the 2020 census.

== History ==
The first settlement at the place which later became the village of Steinauer was made in 1856 by Joseph A. Steinauer and his two brothers, Anton and Nicholas, after they were forced to leave their native Switzerland due to famine and depression in 1852. Warnings to avoid “Bloody Kansas” prompted them to settle in what would become Pawnee County. The Steinauer post office was established in 1874, solidifying the settlement's name. The village was platted in 1887 when the Chicago, Rock Island, and Pacific Railroad was extended to that point, and was named for Joseph A. Steinauer, the first postmaster.

== Geography ==
According to the United States Census Bureau, the village has a total area of 0.14 square miles (0.36 km^{2}), all land.

== Demographics ==
Historical population
Census	Pop.	Note	%±
1900	213		—
1910	248		16.4%
1920	213		−14.1%
1930	172		−19.2%
1940	207		20.3%
1950	141		−31.9%
1960	124		−12.1%
1970	118		−4.8%
1980	108		−8.5%
1990	92		−14.8%
2000	74		−19.6%
2010	75		1.4%
2020	59		−21.3%
2021 (est.)	59	Steady	0.0%
U.S. Decennial Census

=== 2010 census ===
As of the census of 2010, there were 75 people, 34 households, and 19 families residing in the village. The population density was 535.7 inhabitants per square mile (206.8/km^{2}). There were 41 housing units at an average density of 292.9 per square mile (113.1/km^{2}). The racial makeup of the village was 98.7% White and 1.3% from two or more races.

There were 34 households, of which 17.6% had children under the age of 18 living with them, 52.9% were married couples living together, 2.9% had a male householder with no wife present, and 44.1% were non-families. 41.2% of all households were made up of individuals, and 20.6% had someone living alone who was 65 years of age or older. The average household size was 2.21 and the average family size was 3.11.

The median age in the village was 47.5 years. 16% of residents were under the age of 18; 10.7% were between the ages of 18 and 24; 21.3% were from 25 to 44; 22.7% were from 45 to 64; and 29.3% were 65 years of age or older. The gender makeup of the village was 45.3% male and 54.7% female.

=== 2000 census ===
As of the census of 2000, there were 74 people, 37 households, and 21 families residing in the village. The population density was 546.1 inhabitants per square mile (210.9/km^{2}). There were 46 housing units at an average density of 339.5 per square mile (131.1/km^{2}). The racial makeup of the village was 100.00% White.

There were 37 households, out of which 21.6% had children under the age of 18 living with them, 51.4% were married couples living together, 2.7% had a female householder with no husband present, and 43.2% were non-families. 40.5% of all households were made up of individuals, and 16.2% had someone living alone who was 65 years of age or older. The average household size was 2.00 and the average family size was 2.71.

In the village, the population was spread out, with 20.3% under the age of 18, 4.1% from 18 to 24, 20.3% from 25 to 44, 35.1% from 45 to 64, and 20.3% who were 65 years of age or older. The median age was 48 years. For every 100 females, there were 100.0 males. For every 100 females age 18 and over, there were 103.4 males.

As of 2000 the median income for a household in the village was $27,500, and the median income for a family was $38,750. Males had a median income of $21,667 versus $18,125 for females. The per capita income for the village was $15,378. There were 8.7% of families and 4.9% of the population living below the poverty line, including no under eighteens and none of those over 64.

== Education ==
Its school district is Humboldt Table Rock Steinauer Public Schools.
