= Brock, Nebraska =

- Village
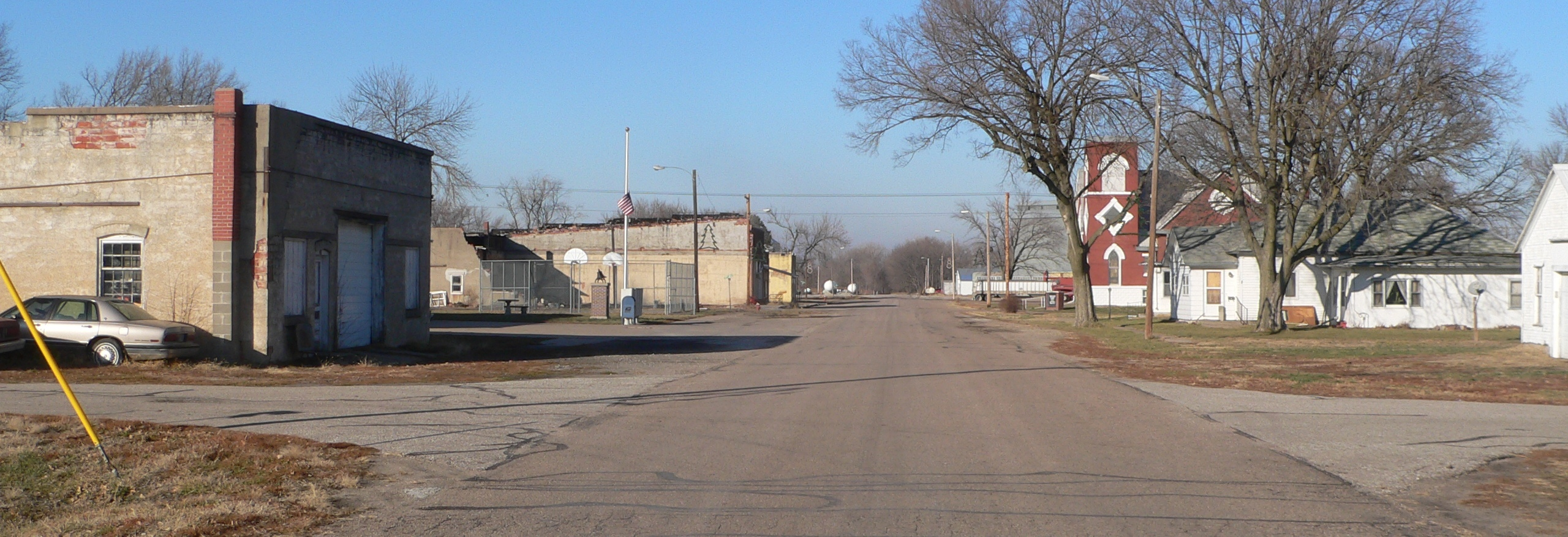
- Downtown Brock: Main Street

- Location of Brock, Nebraska
- Coordinates: 40°28′49″N 95°57′36″W
- Country: United States
- State: Nebraska
- County: Nemaha

Area
  - Total: 0.31 sq mi (0.81 km^{2})
  - Land: 0.31 sq mi (0.81 km^{2})
  - Water: 0 sq mi (0.00 km^{2})
- Elevation: 965 ft (294 m)

Population (2020)
  - Total: 122
  - Estimate (2021): 121
  - Density: 390/sq mi (150/km^{2})
- Time zone: UTC-6 (Central (CST))
  - Summer (DST): UTC-5 (CDT)
- ZIP code: 68320
- Area code: 402
- FIPS code: 31-06505
- GNIS feature ID: 0827658

Brock is a village in Nemaha County, Nebraska, United States. The population was 122 at the 2020 census.

== History ==
Brock was founded in 1854. Through its history, the village has been called Dayton, Howard, Clinton, and Podunk. It was renamed Brock, after a railroad official, when the railroad was built through the town in 1882.

== Geography ==
Brock is located at 40°28′49″N 95°57′36″W (40.480194, -95.959910).

According to the United States Census Bureau, the village has a total area of 0.31 square miles (0.80 km^{2}), all land.

=== Climate ===
Climate data for Brock, Nebraska (coordinates:40.4797°N 95.9599°W, 1991-2020 precipitation normals)
Month	Jan	Feb	Mar	Apr	May	Jun	Jul	Aug	Sep	Oct	Nov	Dec	Year
Average precipitation inches (mm)	0.87 (22)	1.04 (26)	1.90 (48)	2.85 (72)	5.43 (138)	5.11 (130)	4.41 (112)	3.49 (89)	3.09 (78)	2.67 (68)	1.67 (42)	1.16 (29)	33.69 (854)
Source: NOAA

== Demographics ==
Historical population
Census	Pop.	Note	%±
1890	348		—
1900	543		56.0%
1910	434		−20.1%
1920	274		−36.9%
1930	328		19.7%
1940	373		13.7%
1950	283		−24.1%
1960	213		−24.7%
1970	192		−9.9%
1980	189		−1.6%
1990	143		−24.3%
2000	162		13.3%
2010	112		−30.9%
2020	123		9.8%
2021 (est.)	121	▼	−1.6%
U.S. Decennial Census

=== 2010 census ===
As of the census of 2010, there were 112 people, 56 households, and 31 families residing in the village. The population density was 361.3 inhabitants per square mile (139.5/km^{2}). There were 72 housing units at an average density of 232.3 per square mile (89.7/km^{2}). The racial makeup of the village was 99.1% White and 0.9% from other races.

There were 56 households, of which 12.5% had children under the age of 18 living with them, 44.6% were married couples living together, 10.7% had a female householder with no husband present, and 44.6% were non-families. 39.3% of all households were made up of individuals, and 23.2% had someone living alone who was 65 years of age or older. The average household size was 2.00 and the average family size was 2.65.

The median age in the village was 56 years. 11.6% of residents were under the age of 18; 7.3% were between the ages of 18 and 24; 17% were from 25 to 44; 34% were from 45 to 64; and 30.4% were 65 years of age or older. The gender makeup of the village was 44.6% male and 55.4% female.

=== 2000 census ===
As of the census of 2000, there were 162 people, 68 households, and 43 families residing in the village. The population density was 521.1 inhabitants per square mile (201.2/km^{2}). There were 77 housing units at an average density of 247.7 per square mile (95.6/km^{2}). The racial makeup of the village was 95.06% White, 3.09% Native American, and 1.85% from two or more races. Hispanic or Latino of any race were 1.85% of the population.

There were 68 households, out of which 26.5% had children under the age of 18 living with them, 52.9% were married couples living together, 7.4% had a female householder with no husband present, and 35.3% were non-families. 29.4% of all households were made up of individuals, and 22.1% had someone living alone who was 65 years of age or older. The average household size was 2.38 and the average family size was 2.98.

In the village, the population was spread out, with 27.2% under the age of 18, 5.6% from 18 to 24, 22.8% from 25 to 44, 22.8% from 45 to 64, and 21.6% who were 65 years of age or older. The median age was 41 years. For every 100 females, there were 84.1 males. For every 100 females age 18 and over, there were 76.1 males.

The median income for a household in the village was $26,250, and the median income for a family was $28,000. Males had a median income of $27,250 versus $17,813 for females. The per capita income for the village was $11,999. About 12.5% of families and 11.5% of the population were below the poverty line, including 13.0% of those under the age of eighteen and 6.7% of those 65 or over.
