= Shubert, Nebraska =

Village in Richardson County, Nebraska, United States

- Village
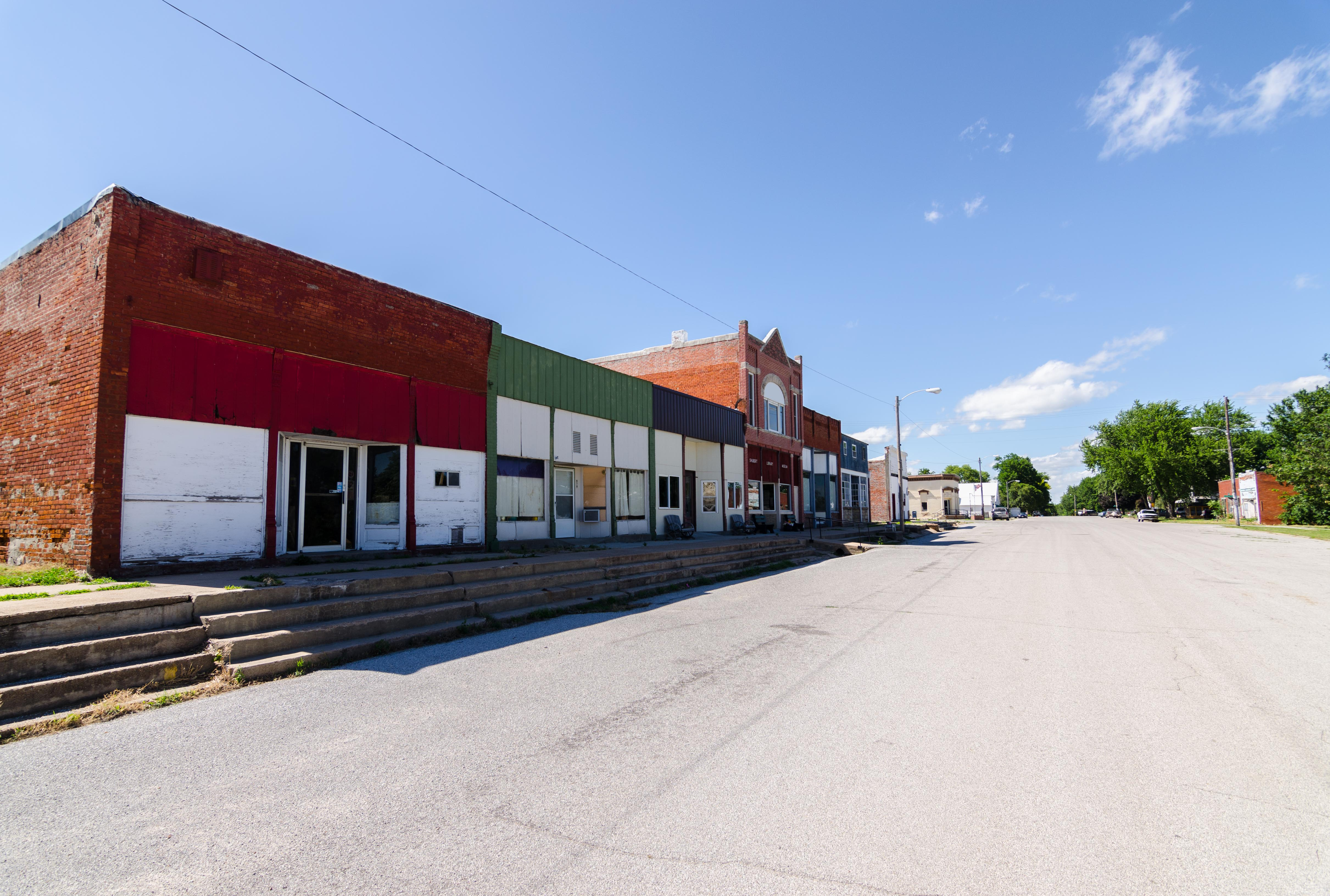
- Main Street in Shubert, June 2017

- Location of Shubert, Nebraska
- Coordinates: 40°14′09″N 95°41′01″W
- Country: United States
- State: Nebraska
- County: Richardson

Area
  - Total: 0.21 sq mi (0.54 km^{2})
  - Land: 0.21 sq mi (0.54 km^{2})
  - Water: 0 sq mi (0.00 km^{2})
- Elevation: 1,129 ft (344 m)

Population (2020)
  - Total: 163
  - Estimate (2021): 161
  - Density: 780/sq mi (300/km^{2})
- Time zone: UTC-6 (Central (CST))
  - Summer (DST): UTC-5 (CDT)
- ZIP code: 68437
- Area code: 402
- FIPS code: 31-45225
- GNIS feature ID: 2399815

Shubert is a village in Richardson County, Nebraska, United States. The population was 163 at the 2020 census. It is the mailing address of Indian Cave State Park which contains petroglyphs. The park is 6 miles northeast of the center of Shubert and is on the bluffs of the Missouri River.

== History ==
Shubert was platted in 1883. The village was named for Henry W. Shubert, a pioneer settler.

== Geography ==
According to the United States Census Bureau, the village has a total area of 0.21 square miles (0.54 km^{2}), all land.

== Demographics ==
Historical population
Census	Pop.	Note	%±
1900	303		—
1910	311		2.6%
1920	397		27.7%
1930	387		−2.5%
1940	404		4.4%
1950	295		−27.0%
1960	231		−21.7%
1970	240		3.9%
1980	267		11.3%
1990	237		−11.2%
2000	252		6.3%
2010	150		−40.5%
2020	163		8.7%
2021 (est.)	161	▼	−1.2%
U.S. Decennial Census

=== 2010 census ===
As of the census of 2010, there were 150 people, 73 households, and 48 families residing in the village. The population density was 714.3 inhabitants per square mile (275.8/km^{2}). There were 103 housing units at an average density of 490.5 per square mile (189.4/km^{2}). The racial makeup of the village was 96.7% White, 0.7% from other races, and 2.7% from two or more races. Hispanic or Latino of any race were 2.7% of the population.

There were 73 households, of which 19.2% had children under the age of 18 living with them, 52.1% were married couples living together, 9.6% had a female householder with no husband present, 4.1% had a male householder with no wife present, and 34.2% were non-families. 30.1% of all households were made up of individuals, and 15.1% had someone living alone who was 65 years of age or older. The average household size was 2.05 and the average family size was 2.52.

The median age in the village was 48.3 years. 18% of residents were under the age of 18; 7.3% were between the ages of 18 and 24; 19.4% were from 25 to 44; 36% were from 45 to 64; and 19.3% were 65 years of age or older. The gender makeup of the village was 50.7% male and 49.3% female.

=== 2000 census ===
As of the census of 2000, there were 252 people, 100 households, and 64 families residing in the village. The population density was 1,204.9 inhabitants per square mile (465.2/km^{2}). There were 110 housing units at an average density of 525.9 per square mile (203.1/km^{2}). The racial makeup of the village was 97.22% White, 1.19% Native American, 0.79% from other races, and 0.79% from two or more races. Hispanic or Latino of any race were 2.78% of the population.

There were 100 households, out of which 37.0% had children under the age of 18 living with them, 49.0% were married couples living together, 9.0% had a female householder with no husband present, and 36.0% were non-families. 31.0% of all households were made up of individuals, and 13.0% had someone living alone who was 65 years of age or older. The average household size was 2.52 and the average family size was 3.20.

In the village, the population was spread out, with 31.7% under the age of 18, 7.5% from 18 to 24, 29.4% from 25 to 44, 18.7% from 45 to 64, and 12.7% who were 65 years of age or older. The median age was 36 years. For every 100 females, there were 93.8 males. For every 100 females age 18 and over, there were 95.5 males.

As of 2000 the median income for a household in the village was $25,417, and the median income for a family was $35,625. Males had a median income of $25,455 versus $20,625 for females. The per capita income for the village was $11,505. About 7.2% of families and 14.9% of the population were below the poverty line, including 17.5% of those under the age of eighteen and 10.8% of those 65 or over.

== Education ==
Its school district is Humboldt Table Rock Steinauer Public Schools.

Shubert was previously in Southeast Nebraska Consolidated Schools. On January 1, 2009, it merged into the Humboldt Table Rock Steinauer School District.

== See also ==
- List of municipalities in Nebraska
