= Ioway Tribal National Park =

Tribal national park located on the Iowa Reservation

- Interactive map of Ioway Tribal National Park
- Location: Ioway Reservation
- Nearest city: White Cloud, Kansas
- Coordinates: 40°1′8.36″N 95°20′47.36″W
- Area: 444 acres (180 ha)
- Created: 2020
- Operator: Iowa Tribe of Kansas and Nebraska

The Ioway Tribal National Park is a tribal national park established by the Iowa Tribe of Kansas and Nebraska. The 444-acre park is located entirely within the Ioway Reservation, next to the Missouri River southeast of Rulo on the border between Kansas and Nebraska. The Park was created in 2020 and is set to open to the public in 2025.

== History ==
Formerly inhabiting what is now the state of Iowa, the Iowa people were relocated to northeastern Kansas in 1836. The Ioway Reservation originally included 12,000 acres. Following the Dawes Act of 1887, the land was sold to or acquired by non-Indians, who by the 1940s owned 90% of the land. As of 2020 the tribe has reacquired one-third of its original territory.

Botanist Ray Schulenberg owned the land where the national park would come to be for 60 years. He lived there in a shack, preserving and restoring the tallgrass prairie. He donated the land to The Nature Conservancy in 1989.

In 2018, the Nature Conservancy of Nebraska transferred 160 acres of historic tribal land in Richardson County to the Iowa Tribe of Kansas and Nebraska. The Nature Conservancy purchased the land in 1994 with help from the Nebraska Environmental Trust. In 2020, the Nature Conservancy transferred an additional 284 acres of land to the tribe.

== Information ==
The Ioway Tribal National Park is located entirely within the 3000-acre Rulo Bluffs Preserve. The state of Nebraska has designated the Rulo Bluffs as a Biologically Unique Landscape. Collecting and motorized vehicles on the preserve are prohibited unless needed for management and tribal permission is required for access to the park.

Iowa Tribe of Kansas and Nebraska Vice Chair Lance Foster indicated that the national park would be used for camping, birdwatching, and hiking.

The Ioway Tribal National Park overlooks an historic trading village, the Leary Site, that was used to trade items like buffalo hides and pipe stones and was active in 13th to 15th centuries. The area is also an important home for three burial mounds that date all the way back to 3000 years.

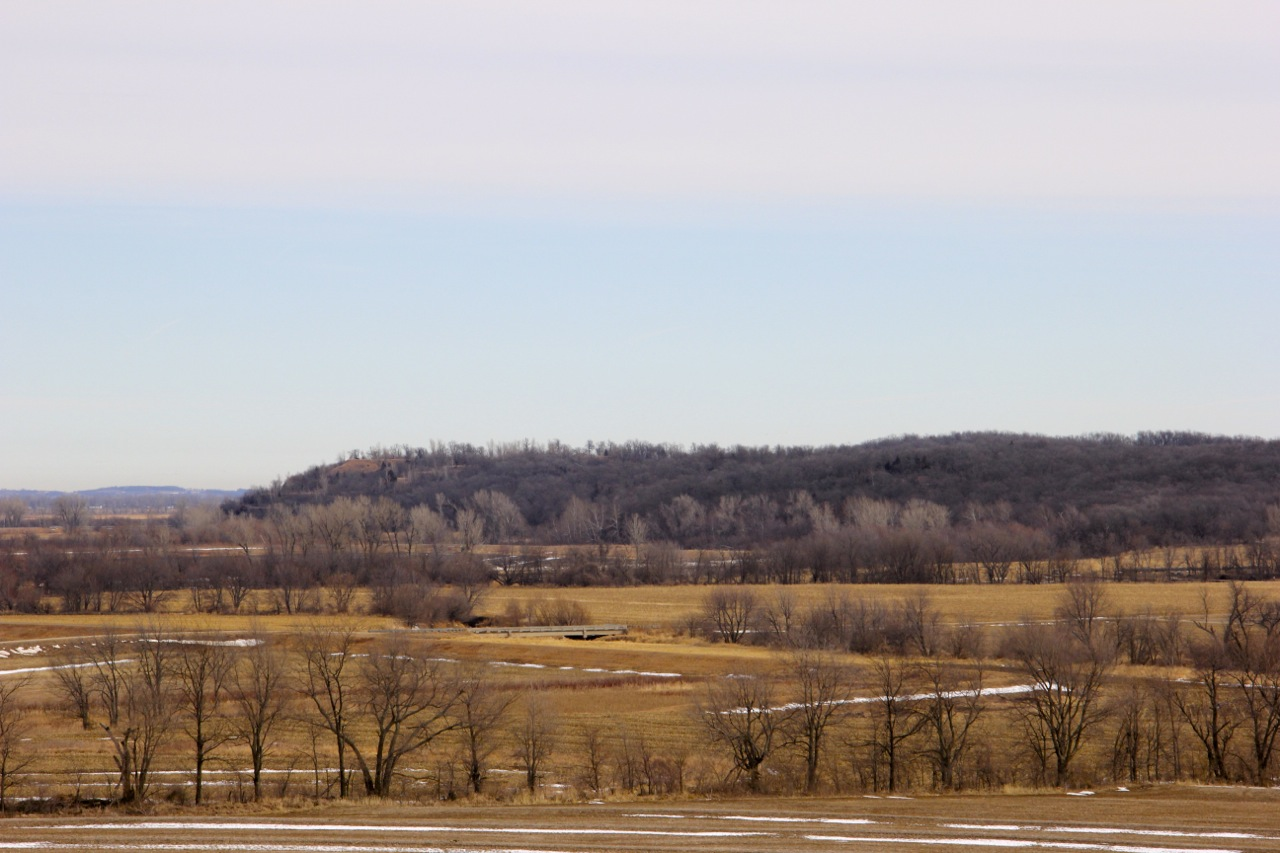
Leary Site National Historic Landmark

== Habitat ==
The Ioway Tribal National Park includes overlapping ecosystems of tallgrass prairie, ridgetop prairie, and hardwood forest. Trees found in the park include pin oak, bur oak, red oak, hickory, black walnut, redbud, ironwood, buckeye, American basswood, and pawpaw. Woodland flora such as jack-in-the-pulpit and yellow lady's slipper also live in the park.

Fauna living in the park include southern flying squirrels, timber rattlesnakes, and cerulean warblers.

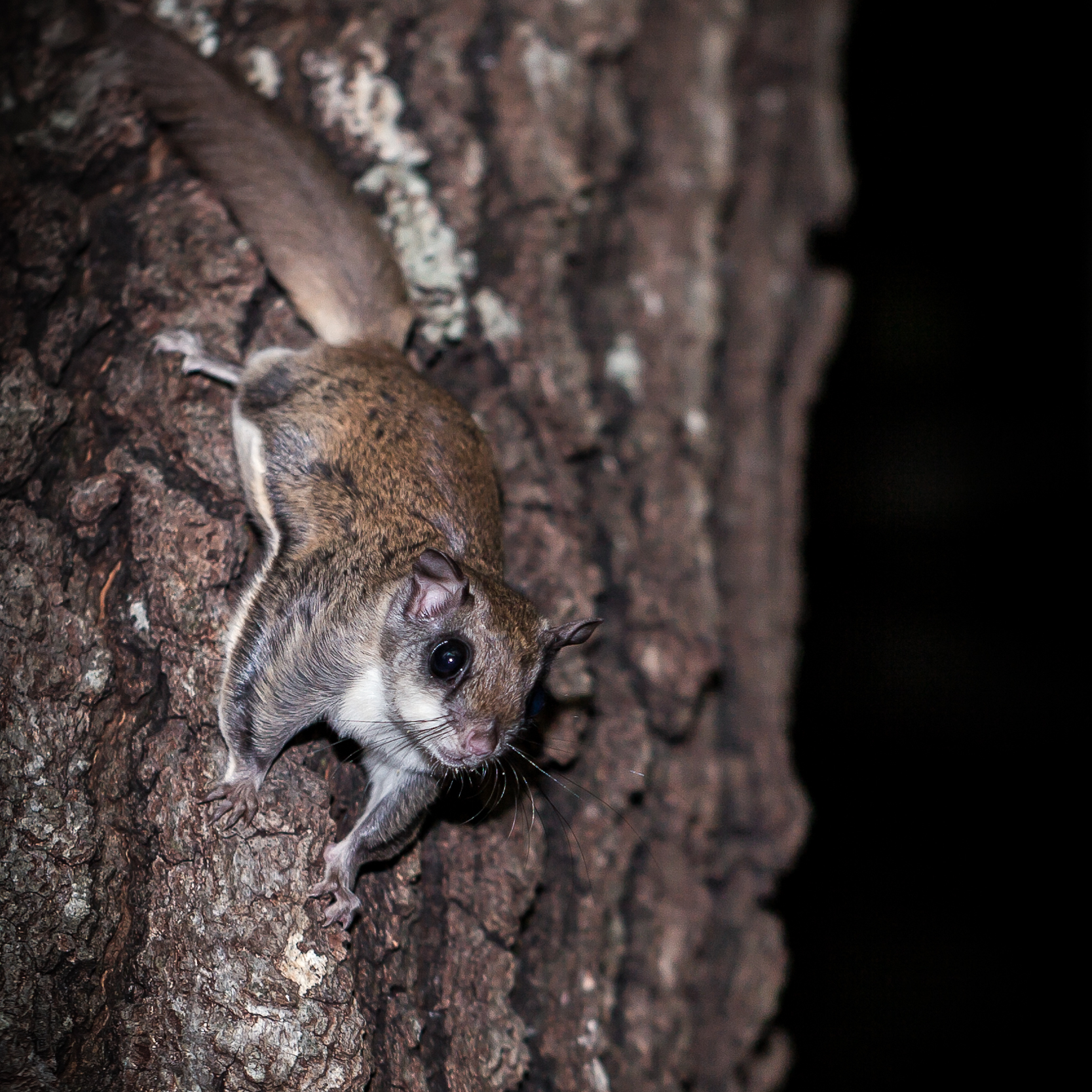
Southern Flying Squirrel

== See also ==
- Leary Site
- Loess Bluffs National Wildlife Refuge
