= Nemaha Half-Breed Reservation =

- Location within Nebraska
- Coordinates: 40°14′24″N 95°34′48″W
- Country: United States
- State: Nebraska
- County: Nemaha County
- Founded: 1830
- Disestablished: 1860

The Nemaha Half-Breed Reservation was established by the Fourth Treaty of Prairie du Chien of 1830, which set aside a tract of land for the mixed-ancestry descendants of French-Canadian trappers and women of the Oto, Iowa, and Omaha, as well as the Yankton and Santee Sioux tribes.

Located in part of the Indian Territory, which was later in the Nebraska Territory and then the state of Nebraska, the tract's eastern border was the Missouri River. The reservation extended west for 10 miles (16 km). The north/south borders were between the Little Nemaha River to the north and the Great Nemaha River, near Falls City to the south.

In 1861 the Reservation was disbanded as a legal entity. The owners of plots were never required to live on the properties they had been allotted, and many eventually sold their lands to white settlers. Some white men married native women to get control of their property. One of the original survey lines has been followed (and identified) by the Half-Breed Road, which runs in a southeast direction from here. The descendants of some of these multicultural families still live in the area.

The Underground Railroad, a route staffed by volunteers' helping slaves escaped to the North, ran through the Reservation toward Mayhew Cabin in Nebraska City. This was its last stop, located 35 miles (56 km) north of the Tract.

== History ==
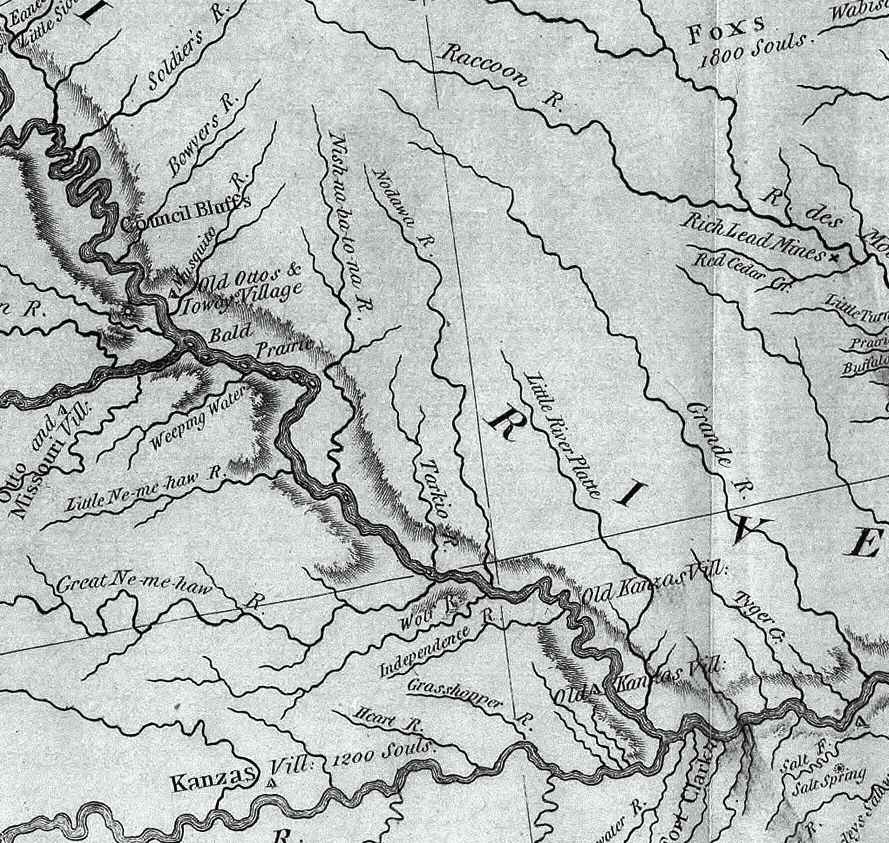
This section from the Lewis and Clark map of 1814 shows period Indian villages in SW Iowa, SE Nebraska, and NW Missouri. It also shows the Little and Great Nemaha rivers.

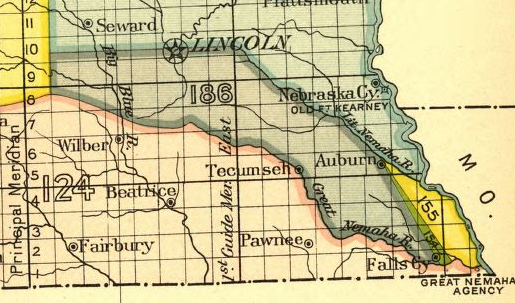
A map of the Nemaha Half-Breed reservation as defined in the Treaty of Prairie du Chien in 1830. The reservation is shown in sections 154 and 155 at the bottom right corner of the map.

The Omaha and other tribes asked the government to set aside territory for their mixed-race descendants. Under the patrilineal systems of the Omaha and Osage, children of white fathers had no place in the tribes, where children belonged to their father's gens. Seeking to help mixed-blood Indian descendants get settled in society, the United States government designated allotments of land in western territory for their use. These were known as the Half-Breed Tracts. Because of American Indian tribes' rules of descent and membership, European-American society's discrimination, and the distance that such mixed-race families lived from most European Americans, the children of unions between European fathers and certain Indian mothers were often left outside the social networks of both societies. Generally Indian women and their French-Canadian trader husbands and children lived under the protection of the women's tribes, but their descendants were not considered members of the tribes unless they were officially adopted, as they had white fathers, so were considered "white".

The Omaha and Osage tribal structures were divided into two moitie, representing the Earth and the Sky. Each had five gentes or clans, considered to have been descended from an ancestor representing an element of each moitie. Each gens had a hereditary chief from the male line. Each moitie was represented by a head chief, and the two kept balance in the tribe. The clans had specific responsibilities related to their moitie. Children belonged to their father's gens, so within this structure, there was no place for children whose father was outside the culture, unless they were officially adopted into the tribe.

At the same time, the European-American "tribe" of the majority of the United States considered the children to be Native American, because of their mothers, although the United States society was generally patriarchal, and patrilineal in terms of inheritance and descent.

The United States government selected an allotment of land along the Missouri River bluffs, an area described as "too steep and tree-covered for farming, fit only for hunting." It was described in the Treaty of Prairie du Chien of 1830, confirmed by the Otoe, Omaha, Missouria, and other tribes and the government, which established the rules for the half-breed tract. The government identified a tract of approximately 138,000 acres (560 km^{2}).

The tract was located between the Little and Great Nemaha rivers (spelled Ne-me-haw on the map) in what became Nemaha County. By 1833 approximately 200 half-breeds lived on the designated land. It was not until 1854 that Congress authorized the reservation and the government established an eligibility list of potential landowners. By 1858 the list had 445 names of people eligible to receive 320 acres (1.3 km^{2}) each. By then, however, non-Indian squatters occupied almost half the land and the government did not evict them. When allotments were finalized on September 10, 1860, each eligible person received 314 acres (1.27 km^{2}). Louis Neal received the first patent to own land on the reservation.

Owners were never required to live on their properties, and many eventually sold their lands to non-Indian settlers. One of the original survey lines is now partly marked by the Half-Breed Road which runs in a southeast direction from the Missouri River. Some of the descendants still live in the area.

Since the land belonged exclusively to the Otoe prior to the exchange, the government worked to secure agreement by the Omaha, Iowa, and Yankton and Santee bands of Sioux to pay the Otoe $3000 for the rights of their "half-breeds" to live on the reservation. Original plans were for land ownership to be held in common, as other American Indian land titles were held. However, legislation included a provision allowing the US President to assign individual tracts to individual owners. In 1860, thirty years after the creation of the Reservation, the government moved to allot tracts to individual households, in an effort to force assimilation to European-American practices. This was the first time in the history of American acts and treaties that American Indians were allotted land in severalty.

== Towns ==
=== Barada ===
In 1856 Antonine Barada, son of Ta-ing-the-hae, an Omaha woman, and Michael Barada, a French fur trapper and interpreter, went to Nebraska from St. Louis to settle on the newly designated land. He did not receive a patent on his 320 acres (1.3 km^{2}) of land until 1860. It was in what is today Richardson County, Nebraska. In doing so, he became the first settler of Nebraska's newly designated Half-Breed Tract. A town named after him was established in that tract while Barada ran a fur-trading post there.

There is evidence the Underground Railroad ran through this tract up to John Brown's Cave, located 35 miles (56 km) north.

=== St. Deroin ===
Indian Cave State Park is located in the central section of the Nemaha tract. On its northern edge is the site of the town of St. Deroin, founded by "half-breeds" to serve their reservation. Joseph Deroin was the son of a French Canadian trapper Amable De Rouins and his Oto wife. The De Rouins had traded along the Missouri River for decades; a trading post was already operating here when Lewis and Clark came through in 1804.

The younger Deroin operated a trading post along the river's edge starting in 1840. He was killed in 1858 in a dispute over money as white settlers moved into the area and displaced Native residents. The town became predominantly European American, with settlers moving in around Deroin's trading post. They named the town St. Deroin. Since that time, most of the town has been washed away by floods, leaving only a cemetery and the St. Deroin School on the original location. Half Breed Creek, named after the tract, still flows through the area.

Other notable residents of the tract included French-Canadian fur traders who had married Native American women, such as Charles Rouleau. Henry Fontenelle, a mixed-race son of Lucien Fontenelle, an ethnic French-American trader from New Orleans, and Me-um-bane, a daughter of the Omaha principal chief Big Elk (1770–1846/1853), also had a plot there.

== Closure ==
Because of continued individual land sales, Nebraska's Half-Breed Tract vanished as a legal entity by 1861. Today much of the former reservation land is within the boundaries of the Indian Cave State Park.

== See also ==
- Native American tribes in Nebraska

== Bibliography ==
- Chapman, B.B. "The Nemaha Half-Breed Tract", The Otoes and the Missiourias. Chapter 5.
- Barkwell, Lawrence. "Great Nemaha Half Breed Tract", Louis Riel Institute.
- Barkwell, Lawrence. "The People of the Métis Nation: D-G/History through Biography, page 10.
