= Leary Site =

Archaeological site in Nebraska, US

- U.S. National Register of Historic Places
- U.S. National Historic Landmark
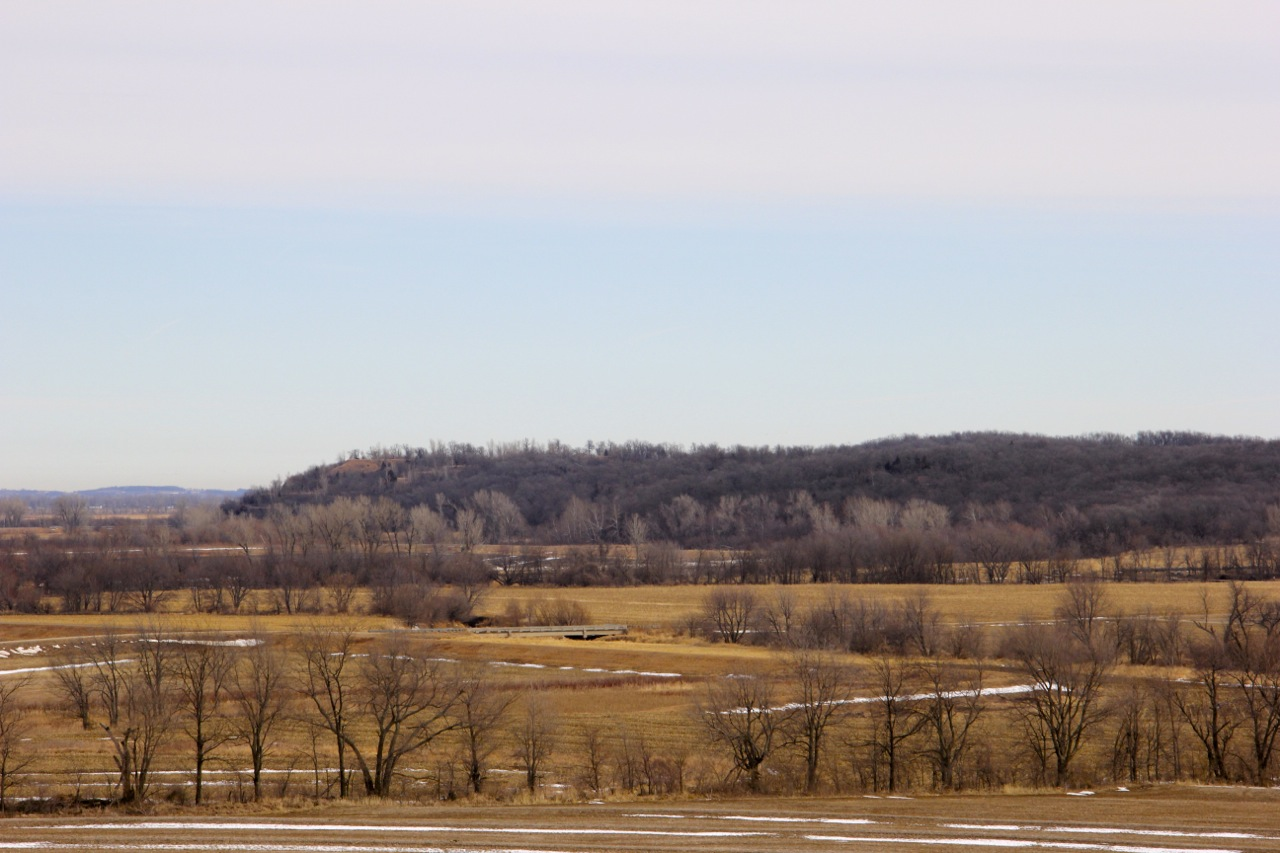
- Nearest city: Rulo, Nebraska
- NRHP reference No.: 66000449

Significant dates
- Added to NRHP: October 15, 1966
- Designated NHL: July 19, 1964

Leary Site, also known as 25-RH-1 or Leary-Kelly Site, is an archaeological site near Rulo, Nebraska and the Big Nemaha River. The site now lies entirely on the reservation of the Iowa Tribe of Kansas and Nebraska. The area was once a village and burial site.

== Excavations and Research ==
On July 12, 1804, during their expedition into the Louisiana Purchase, Meriwether Lewis and William Clark stopped along the Nemaha River. William Clark set out and noted several mounds in the area, the smaller mounds he inferred to be most likely trash pits and where homes had formerly been and the larger mounds to be burial mounds.

Frederick H. Sterns, faculty the Peabody Museum of the Harvard University, led an excavation of the site in the year 1915. During his excavations, he noted several lodges in the valley of the Nemaha River and many more on the neighboring Missouri River Bluffs. E. E. Blackman led a three-week excavation of the site in the summer 1926. By this time, the site had been further disturbed by the use of farming. During this three-week period, several shards of pottery were excavated. These pottery shards were shell-tempered as opposed to shard tempered or stone pottery, which is more common to this area. Blackman stated that by identifying the pottery, archaeologists would be able to then identify the people that inhabited the area. W. Duncan Strong identified the area as a site of the Oneota. This was one of the furthest western sites of this tribe, who normally resided in areas such as Missouri.

In 1935, Strong's theory of the Oneota was evaluated by T. A. Hill, who was a member of the staff at the Nebraska Historical Society. Hill oversaw a three-week excavation at the site and was assisted by George F. Lamb and a crew of archaeologists. In the three-week period, the group of archaeologists managed to excavate 153 pits, one housing area, seven burial sites, and several scattered test pit excavations. Lamb and his crew also found several projectile points that varied in color, gray, pink, white, and brown and were made of flint. Two different samples of burnt pottery were sent to the University of Wisconsin for radiocarbon dating. The sample of pottery dated to 1210 AD and 1350 AD. In 1939 the University of Nebraska Archaeological Survey excavated two pits.

In the late 1950s George A. Agogino and a crew of excavators went out to the site to dig test pits. Agogino at the time of the excavation taught anthropology course and the University of Nebraska. The pits the crew dug were about 18 inches in depth and contained femurs, tibias, and fragments of skulls. The remains were found to belong to at least three different individuals. In 1965, the Nebraska State Historical Society sent a crew led by John Garrett and Wendell Frantz on a ten-week excavation of the area. During this time the crew excavated 30 pits, three burials, a house, and several other features such as hearths.

== Oneota People ==
The Native American village was once inhabited by people of the Oneota tribe. The Leary Site in one of the further western sites of these people. The subsistence of the people of this site was partly horticulture and partly from hunting bison. The people of the village used many tools made of both stone and parts of animals. Scrapers and other tools were we most often used by women. The Nebraska State Historical Society excavated a mule deer antler that had been used as a scraper.

== Artifacts Today ==
Many of the documents, research, and artifacts of the excavations of 1926, 1935, 1965, and 1979 are curated by the Archaeology Divisions of the Nebraska State Historical Society. All of the human remains excavated from burial sites in 1935 and 1965 have been repatriated. Many artifacts, from Sterns excavations in 1926, reside in the Peabody Museum of Archaeology and Ethnology of Harvard University. Ceramics and other artifacts from the excavation in 1935 were given in part to the Smithsonian Institution and the University of Michigan Museum of Anthropology.

== Historical Landmark Status ==
The Leary site was declared a National Historical Landmark in 1964. Though the site is not open to the public, there is a plaque on a brick marker to commemorate the site as a National Historical Landmark.
