= List of protected areas of federally-recognized tribes in the United States =

The following are protected areas designated by federally-recognized Native American tribes in the United States.

Name	Nation(s)	Date recognized	Area	Notes	References
'Ahakhav Tribal Preserve	Colorado River Indian Tribes	1995	1,253 acres		
Canyon de Chelly National Monument	Navajo Nation	April 1, 1931	83,840 acres	Officially a unit of and managed by the National Park Service but entirely owned by the Navajo Tribal Trust of the Navajo. Its Tseyi' Dine' Heritage Area - Cottonwood Campground is run by the Navajo Nation's parks division.	
Four Corners Monument Navajo Tribal Park	Navajo Nation	1931			
Frog Bay Tribal National Park	Red Cliff Band of Lake Superior Chippewa	2012	175		
Ioway Tribal National Park	Iowa Tribe of Kansas and Nebraska	2020	444 acres		
Lake Powell Navajo Tribal Park	Navajo Nation				
Little Colorado River Navajo Tribal Park	Navajo Nation				
Monument Valley Navajo Tribal Park	Navajo Nation				
Three Affiliated Tribes National Park	Mandan, Hidatsa, and Arikara Nation		2,100 acres		
Ute Mountain Tribal Park	Ute Mountain Ute Tribe		125,000 acres (51,000 ha)		
Yurok–Tolowa-Dee-niʼ Indigenous Marine Stewardship Area	Resighini Tribe of Yurok People, Tolowa Dee-niʼ Nation, Cher-Ae Heights Indian Community of the Trinidad Rancheria	2023	700 sq mi		
