= Febold Feboldson =

Fakelore character from Nebraska

Folk tale
- Name: Febold Feboldson
- Aarne–Thompson grouping: F531 Giants
- Mythology: Nebraska Folklore
- Country: United States
- Region: Nebraska
- Origin Date: 1923
- Published in: Gothenburg Independent (1923-1933); Prairie Schooner (1932); Nebraska Folklore pamphlets (1937); Nebraska Folklore (Pound, 1947)
- Related: Paul Bunyan; Antonine Barada

Febold Feboldson is an American folk hero who was a Swedish American plainsman and cloudbuster from Nebraska. His exploits were originally published in 1923 in the Gothenburg Independent newspaper and the character is now largely considered a part of fakelore as opposed to a genuine folk hero.

== Origin ==
The first stories of Febold Feboldson were published in newspapers in Gothenburg, Nebraska in 1923. The original creator of Febold Feboldson appears to be Wayne Carroll, a lumber salesman in Gothenburg who used Febold in advertising, essentially as a local variant of Paul Bunyan. However, due to the lack of trees in the Great Plains region, Feboldson eventually became a strongman rather than a lumberjack and his prodigious strength was demonstrated through other means in the stories. Caroll and another man, Don Holmes, wrote numerous Febold Feboldson stories between 1928 and 1933, which featured Feboldson taking on Native Americans, politicians, disease outbreaks, droughts, tornadoes, and excessive heat and cold.

In 1932, Paul Robert Beath published the first widely circulated story about Febold Feboldson, "Paul Bunyan and Febold" in the University of Nebraska–Lincoln's literary magazine, Prairie Schooner (vol. VI, p. 59-61). Beath's account claims to be based on interviews with "Bergstrom Stromberg", a supposed elderly descendant of Feboldson, who was acquainted with both Bunyan and Feboldson. The association with Bunyan gave Febold Feboldson authenticity as a folk hero, despite being a recent creation by Nebraska authors. Beath went on to write about Feboldson in the Nebraska Folklore pamphlets published by the Nebraska Writers' Project in 1937.

According to Nebraska folklorist Louise Pound and Paul Beath himself, Feboldson was inspired by a notable Swedish immigrant, Olof Bergstrom, who helped settle the town of Gothenburg, Nebraska. Bergstrom recruited a significant number of Swedes to settle the town of Gothenburg. Described as a tall, muscular, and "very handsome gentleman" with a winning personality, Bergstrom cast a large shadow in the growing town. Bergstrom once killed a house guest with a shotgun but was acquitted. Following the trial, a grateful Bergstrom gave each juror a $20 bill and was escorted back to his house by a parade led by the Gothenburg Silver Cornet Band. Bergstrom's apparent ability to escape trouble and turn a profit out of bad situations, as well as his role as a founder and community leader in Gothenburg, made him the model for Feboldson.

=== Status as a folk hero ===
Beath firmly denied the idea that Febold Feboldson was a folk hero. Instead, according to Beath, Feboldson was, like all stories, created "by individuals for the entertainment of individuals." Beath argued that each telling of a Febold Feboldson story was based entirely on the narrative which the individual author wished to tell, rather than being formed from existing folklore or a "geist" of the culture from which they are born.

According to folklorist Louise Pound, Feboldson is an integral part of Nebraska folklore due to his rapid rise in popularity in the early twentieth century. However, Pound argues that Febold is part of the "lore of the literary class, the lore of the educated lovers of lore" rather than the general public. This, according to Pound, takes the "folk" element out of Feboldson's status as a figure in folklore, as he is no longer widely known by the average Nebraskan who does not seek out folklore. Pound further argues that Feboldson could have a trajectory similar to the folklore figure which inspired him, Paul Bunyan, which began as a similarly "literary lore" but has since evolved into folklore.

== Themes ==
According to Beath, who wrote the majority of the Feboldson stories and collected many others, Febold Feboldson is meant to be a lighthearted take on the "serious and often tragic" realities of early prairie pioneers. Feboldson stories explain, with obvious and humorously intentional inaccuracy, the origin of natural phenomena and Nebraska traditions. Many Feboldson stories involve the hero facing a form of adversity, usually from the "stubborn" nature of the Nebraska landscape, attempting to overcome the obstacle in grand fashion, and failing in this attempt but inadvertently creating a natural wonder in the process.

Feboldson is usually depicted as a well-meaning and enthusiastic but somewhat oblivious giant. Feboldson's errors in attempting to create a homestead in Nebraska are fanciful exaggerations of the challenges faced by early immigrants who had to adapt their lifestyles to survive in Nebraska. Throughout the stories, Feboldson longs to continue westward to California but is forced to stay in Nebraska by some unavoidable reality, such as his brother's weak will and infirmity. The Feboldson stories, according to Beath, conclude with his retirement in California, the "Valhalla of all good middlewesterners." In this way, Feboldson stories are both a humorous reminder of the hardships of the past and a form of encouragement to those who were still struggling to make a living off the land in the 1930s.

== Stories ==
Beath's original story, "Paul Bunyan and Febold," is as much a story about Paul Bunyan as it is about Febold Feboldson. In the story, which attempts to account for the death of Babe the Blue Ox, Feboldson and Bunyan are both portrayed as giants who helped settle the American West. According to the tale, Feboldson and Bunyan met when they were both tasked with reestablishing the Kansas-Nebraska border after Bunyan had turned the allegedly formerly mountainous land of Kansas upside down to reveal its current, flat plains. Bunyan hitched a plough to Babe, but could not plough a straight line, and instead of carving out the border, carved the channel of the Republican River. In response, Feboldson hybridized bees with eagles to create gigantic bees. Feboldson hitched his plough to the giant bee, which flew off in a perfectly straight "bee-line."

Due to their success, the two giants were sent to fight off the "Dirtylegs tribe" of Native Americans, who were the worst foes on the plains. However, because of the excessive heat of the year, which never fell below 150 degrees, both the giants and the tribe agreed on a truce until cooler weather. As part of their truce, both parties retired to Colorado, to cool off in the shade of the mountains. The Dirtylegs, still too hot, dug caves into the mountains, which accounts for the existence of cave dwellings today.

On the journey to the mountains, Babe the Blue Ox became exhausted and fell asleep in the shade of Pikes Peak. Knowing that the ox would die of hyperthermia when the sun rose the next morning and unable to move the gigantic ox, Febold and Paul pile up rocks around the creature to shade it from the sun. Unfortunately, the rocks only served to help cook the ox whole. Around Christmas, the Dirtylegs left their cave dwellings and, starving from their months of fasting, devoured the ox. They left the rocks which had been piled up around him strewn about the area, which created the Garden of the Gods. However, the meat of Babe was too much for the stomachs of the Dirtylegs and the entire tribe died after consuming him, which is why no one has ever heard of the Dirtylegs since.

This story is, as is to be expected, entirely fabricated. There is no evidence that any tribe known as the "Dirtylegs" ever existed nor do they appear to be modeled on a particular tribe. The portrayal of Native Americans as villains, enemies of progress, or obstacles of settlement is consistent with other American folklore and is rooted in ideas of Manifest Destiny and the history of the colonization of the American West.

== See also ==
- Folklore
- Tall tales
