= Dawson-Verdon Public Schools =

School district in Nebraska, United States

Dawson-Verdon Public Schools (ID#74-0515-000) was a school district in Nebraska. The district, at the end of its life in 2004, had grades K-12. It included the communities of Dawson and Verdon.

== History ==
It was created in 1959 as a consolidation of the Dawson and Verdon school districts. Initially the district operated a school in each community. However by the 1970s the district moved all students to Dawson, so no more were in Verdon.

By 2002 the area population declined, and with it, the school's population. Circa 2002 the population declined to where the board of trustees felt the district's viability was dissolving. That year the board considered consolidation with the Stella-Southeast Consolidated Public Schools, but decided against this because the board believed that this consolidation was unlikely to survive in the long term. In 2003 the board voted to divide the district between Falls City Public Schools and Humboldt Table Rock Steinauer School District.

The district's final enrollment was 142. The district was dissolved on August 1, 2004. Falls City and Humboldt Table Rock Steinauer districts absorbed portions of the former school district. The board of trustees decided to divide the territory and assets between the two districts. The owners of the school building opted to sell the Dawson Verdon building on an auction John James, the final superintendent, stated that the community was in "mourning" due to the loss of the school.

Humboldt Table Rock Steinauer was to absorb the majority of students, with some students picking that district because its size of enrollment was smaller than Falls City's. Falls City was to take about 33% of the students. Sabetha USD 441 (the school district of Sabetha, Kansas, later merged into Prairie Hills USD 113) and private schools were to take the other students.

== Governance ==
In 2004 Barbara Nordby of the Lincoln Journal Star wrote that "Board members from Dawson didn't always see eye to eye with the Verdon side."

== Athletics ==
By 2004 students wishing to do team athletics played for Falls City teams as there were not enough students for Dawson-Verdon to have its own athletic teams.

== See also ==
- List of school districts in Nebraska
