= Nim City, Nebraska =

Unincorporated community in Nebraska, U.S.

Coordinates: 40°02′38″N 95°52′11″W

Nim City is an unincorporated community in Richardson County, Nebraska, United States.

== History ==
Nim City was platted in 1903 by Betsey U. Nims, and named for her. It was made with the intent that a railroad would pass through. There was a general store, a hotel with about 10 rooms, a livery stable, a blacksmith shop and many homes. Now, only a few homes remain. The railroad never passed through the town.
