= Barada, Nebraska =

Village in Nebraska, US

- Village
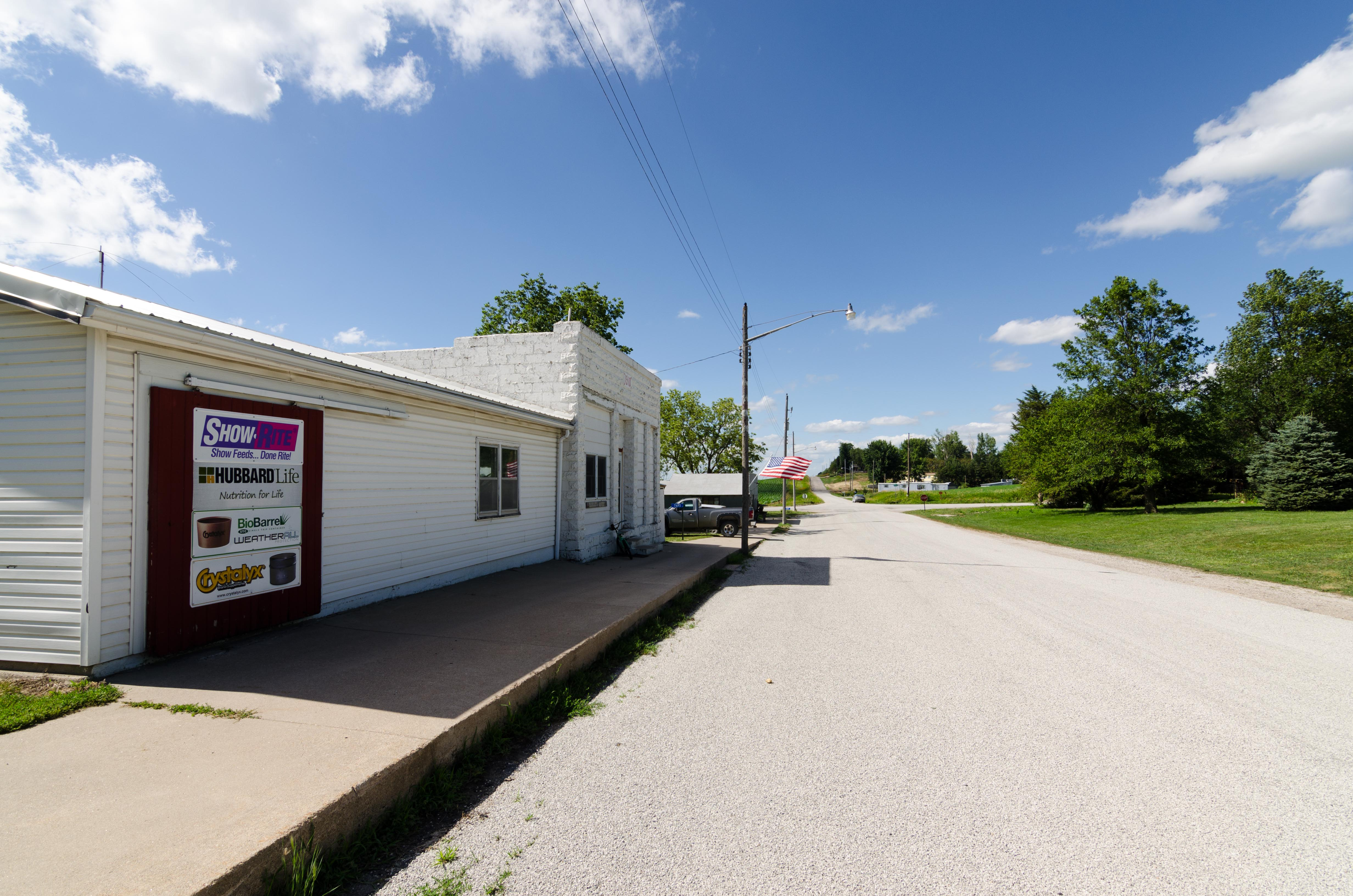

- Location of Barada, Nebraska
- Coordinates: 40°13′06″N 95°34′40″W
- Country: United States
- State: Nebraska
- County: Richardson

Area
  - Total: 0.089 sq mi (0.23 km^{2})
  - Land: 0.089 sq mi (0.23 km^{2})
  - Water: 0 sq mi (0.00 km^{2})
- Elevation: 1,119 ft (341 m)

Population (2020)
  - Total: 20
  - Estimate (2021): 20
  - Density: 231.8/sq mi (89.48/km^{2})
- Time zone: UTC-6 (Central (CST))
  - Summer (DST): UTC-5 (CDT)
- ZIP code: 68355
- Area code: 402
- FIPS code: 31-03040
- GNIS feature ID: 2398030

Barada is a village in northeast Richardson County, Nebraska, United States. The population was 20 at the 2020 census.

== History ==
First settled in the 1850s, Barada was not incorporated as a village until 1927. The village was named in honor of the mid-19th-century folk hero Antonine Barada, who ran a trading post within the former Nemaha Half-Breed Reservation.

== Geography ==
According to the United States Census Bureau, the village has a total area of 0.09 square miles (0.23 km^{2}), all land.

== Demographics ==
Historical population
| Census | Pop. | Note | %± |
|---|---|---|---|
| 1880 | 70 | | — |
| 1900 | 147 | | — |
| 1910 | 118 | | −19.7% |
| 1920 | 118 | | 0.0% |
| 1930 | 108 | | −8.5% |
| 1940 | 132 | | 22.2% |
| 1950 | 83 | | −37.1% |
| 1960 | 58 | | −30.1% |
| 1970 | 58 | | 0.0% |
| 1980 | 36 | | −37.9% |
| 1990 | 24 | | −33.3% |
| 2000 | 28 | | 16.7% |
| 2010 | 24 | | −14.3% |
| 2020 | 21 | | −12.5% |
| 2021 (est.) | 20 | ▼ | −4.8% |
U.S. Decennial Census

=== 2010 census ===
As of the census of 2010, there were 24 people, 12 households, and 6 families residing in the village. The population density was 266.7 inhabitants per square mile (103.0/km^{2}). There were 14 housing units at an average density of 155.6 per square mile (60.1/km^{2}). The racial makeup of the village was 100.0% White.

There were 12 households, of which 16.7% had children under the age of 18 living with them, 50.0% were married couples living together, and 50.0% were non-families. 41.7% of all households were made up of individuals, and 16.7% had someone living alone who was 65 years of age or older. The average household size was 2.00 and the average family size was 2.83.

The median age in the village was 55.7 years. 12.5% of residents were under the age of 18; 4.3% were between the ages of 18 and 24; 20.9% were from 25 to 44; 54.2% were from 45 to 64; and 8.3% were 65 years of age or older. The gender makeup of the village was 62.5% male and 37.5% female.

=== 2000 census ===
As of the census of 2000, there were 28 people, 11 households, and 5 families residing in the village. The population density was 296.3 inhabitants per square mile (114.4/km^{2}). There were 13 housing units at an average density of 137.6 per square mile (53.1/km^{2}). The racial makeup of the village was 100.00% White.

There were 11 households, out of which 27.3% had children under the age of 18 living with them, 54.5% were married couples living together, and 45.5% were non-families. 45.5% of all households were made up of individuals, and 27.3% had someone living alone who was 65 years of age or older. The average household size was 2.55 and the average family size was 3.67.

In the village, the population was spread out, with 21.4% under the age of 18, 17.9% from 18 to 24, 17.9% from 25 to 44, 32.1% from 45 to 64, and 10.7% who were 65 years of age or older. The median age was 42 years. For every 100 females, there were 154.5 males. For every 100 females age 18 and over, there were 144.4 males.

As of 2000, the median income for a household in the village was $21,250, and the median income for a family was $46,250. Males had a median income of $22,500 versus $16,875 for females. The per capita income for the village was $13,716. There were no families and 8.0% of the population living below the poverty line, including no under eighteens and 50.0% of those over 64.

== Education ==
Barada is divided between Falls City Public Schools and Humboldt Table Rock Steinauer Public Schools.

Barada was previously in Southeast Nebraska Consolidated Schools. On January 1, 2009, it merged into the Humboldt Table Rock Steinauer School District.

== See also ==
- List of municipalities in Nebraska
