= Straussville, Nebraska =

Unincorporated community in Nebraska, U.S.

Coordinates: 40°06′30″N 95°38′02″W

Straussville is an unincorporated community in Richardson County, Nebraska, United States.

== History ==
Straussville was platted in 1901. It was named for Gustave Strauss, the original owner of the town site.

A post office was established at Straussville in 1899, and remained in operation until it was discontinued in 1912.
