= Preston, Nebraska =

- Village
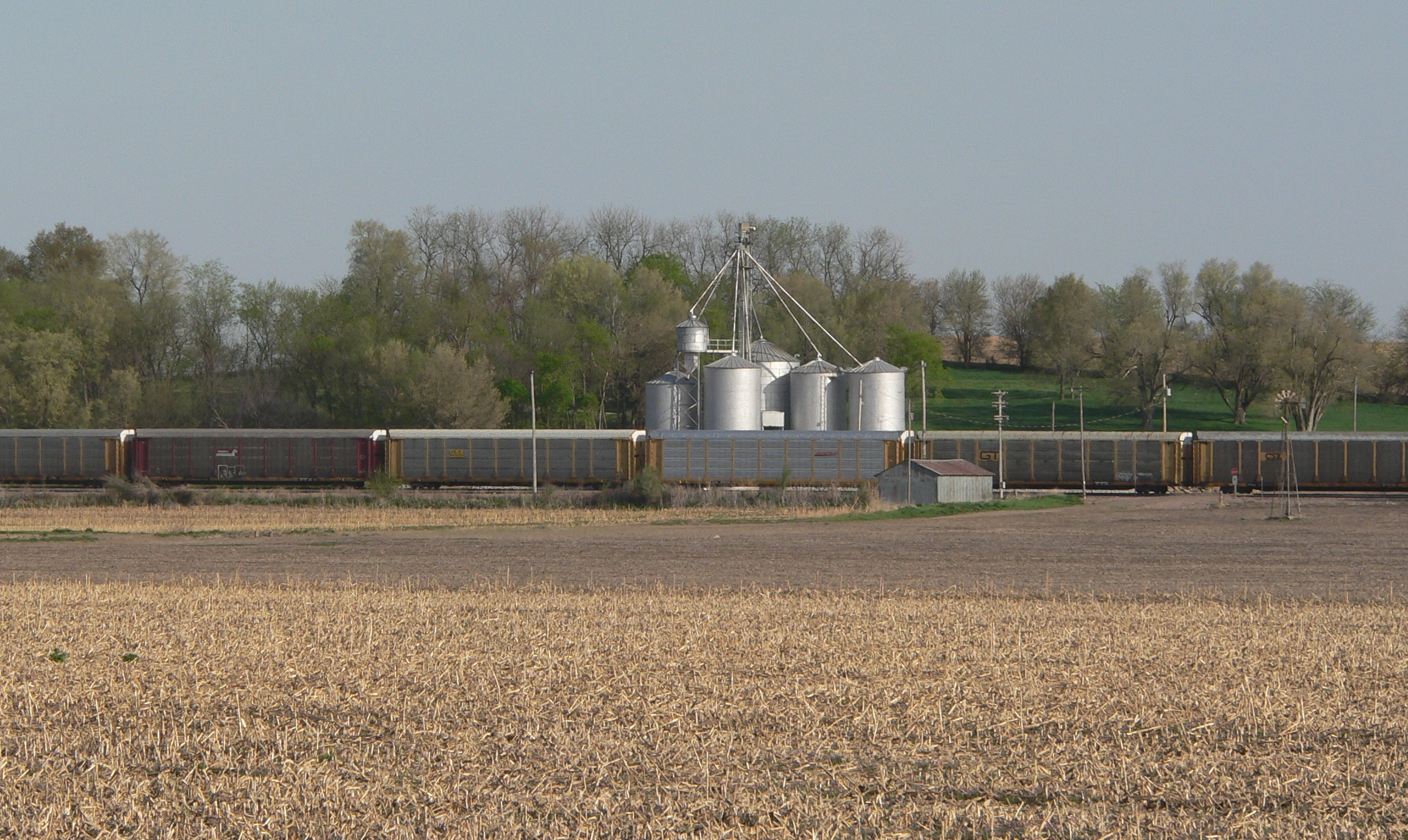
- Grain elevator and train in Preston

- Location of Preston, Nebraska
- Coordinates: 40°02′05″N 95°31′05″W
- Country: United States
- State: Nebraska
- County: Richardson

Area
  - Total: 0.058 sq mi (0.15 km^{2})
  - Land: 0.058 sq mi (0.15 km^{2})
  - Water: 0 sq mi (0.00 km^{2})
- Elevation: 938 ft (286 m)

Population (2020)
  - Total: 19
  - Estimate (2021): 19
  - Density: 333.5/sq mi (128.78/km^{2})
- Time zone: UTC-6 (Central (CST))
  - Summer (DST): UTC-5 (CDT)
- ZIP code: 68355
- Area code: 402
- FIPS code: 31-40325
- GNIS feature ID: 2399023

Preston is a village in Richardson County in Southeastern Nebraska, United States. It is located within the Sac and Fox Reservation. The population was 19 at the 2020 census.

== History ==
The Sac Post Office, established in 1874, was named for the Sac and Fox Indian tribes that live in this area. The offspring of mixed marriages (primarily progeny of early French trappers and adventurers) were given land on the Half-Breed Tract. Some of their descendants still live there, while others sold their land and moved on.

Preston was platted in 1878 when the Atchison & Nebraska Railroad was extended to that point. In February 1880 Philip R. Shelly, the town's founder, built a store and applied for a post office. However, the postal authorities rejected the proposed name of "Blufton", since there was another one in Sherman County. James Eatough, who worked for Shelly, had come from Preston, England, so he suggested that name. On June 23, 1881, "Preston" was accepted by both post office and railroad. The town was then platted on a total of approximately 40 acres in 1881 by Shelly from a point running along the railroad tracks, where a siding was available, to the south. An elevator and a depot were built along the tracks for commerce and travelers. A. D. McAlpine, a telegraph operator from Canada, was the first railroad station agent.

Shelly was the first postmaster. He built one of the general stores and a drugstore, ran the saloon, and owned a livery stable. In addition, he bought and sold cattle and hogs, shipping them to markets in St. Joseph (MO), Kansas City (KS), and Chicago (IL). On Monday and Tuesday nights, the rail yards were busy as men loaded two or three carloads of livestock. The town had a bank, three general stores, two barber shops, two drug stores, two livery stables, two blacksmiths, and two hotels. One of the two harness shops employed six girls to make fly nets for horses.

Preston's first one-room school served the community until 1889, when a larger schoolhouse was built. The grounds were fenced with four-foot woven wire to keep animals out. In the 1920s, several other districts consolidated with Preston and operated a three-year high school.

Preston's peak came in 1890 with a population of 150. The people of Preston represented a wide variety of occupations and avocations. Each helped the town to grow through their business and patronage. It was a center for farmers to market their produce as well as to buy needed supplies. The two two-story hotels provided traveling men a place to stay overnight while selling their wares to the local merchants. The proprietor who ran the business at the Central Hotel couldn't read or write, so he made an "X" whenever his written approval was needed.

Residents and visitors enjoyed a variety of entertainment. There was a dance floor above the bank, which also served as a community opera house. Programs ranged from skits and readings, to debates on pertinent topics. "Medicine shows" were also held here. The local school provided a place for public events such as political debates at Third and Russell Streets. Preston's post office was on Iowa Street not far from the railroad depot and the German Evangelical Church was further south at Third and Iowa Streets. The Bethel Dunkard Society held services at the schoolhouse in German.

The infamous cyclone of May 17, 1896, nearly destroyed Preston (and severely damaged much of southeast Richardson County and northeast Kansas, including several fatalities). Almost every building in town was blown away, or needed repairs. Fires also took their toll including when the Shelly & Rieger general store burned in 1891 and in 1903 when the harness shop caught fire and burned most of the block, including four or five businesses and the Lindell Hotel. Residents could take the train to Falls City for 17 cents and this mode of transportation, both in convenience and low cost, further added to Preston's decline since people could travel more easily to "the big city" of Falls City.

After the cyclone and then the fires, the town started to "dismantle." The Central Hotel and Farmers National Bank were torn down and moved to Falls City. When the automobile became popular, people drove to Falls City to get whatever was needed. Local stores could not compete, so one-by-one they all closed.

In 1928, Preston's elementary school still operated, but the community held its last high school class that year.

Shelly's General Store, then owned by Ryan (or Bryon) Shelly, operated as late as 1933 and in 1928 it was twice victimized by burglars during a rash of burglaries of small stores across the county.

By 1969 the only thing left was the post office, the elementary school, and a voting hall. The post office was made a rural branch in 1974 and the elementary school merged with Falls City. The depot closed in 1953, although coal trains continue to rumble along the north side of town on a regular schedule.

== Geography ==
According to the United States Census Bureau, the village has a total area of 0.06 square miles (0.16 km^{2}), all land.

== Demographics ==
Historical population
Census	Pop.	Note	%±
1900	149		—
1910	122		−18.1%
1920	113		−7.4%
1930	77		−31.9%
1940	120		55.8%
1950	81		−32.5%
1960	66		−18.5%
1970	64		−3.0%
1980	45		−29.7%
1990	40		−11.1%
2000	50		25.0%
2010	28		−44.0%
2020	19		−32.1%
2021 (est.)	19	Steady	0.0%
U.S. Decennial Census

=== 2010 census ===
As of the census of 2010, there were 28 people, 13 households, and 9 families residing in the village. The population density was 466.7 inhabitants per square mile (180.2/km^{2}). There were 14 housing units at an average density of 233.3 per square mile (90.1/km^{2}). The racial makeup of the village was 82.1% White, 14.3% Native American, and 3.6% from two or more races. Hispanic or Latino of any race were 3.6% of the population.

There were 13 households, of which 15.4% had children under the age of 18 living with them, 46.2% were married couples living together, 15.4% had a female householder with no husband present, 7.7% had a male householder with no wife present, and 30.8% were non-families. 23.1% of all households were made up of individuals, and 15.4% had someone living alone who was 65 years of age or older. The average household size was 2.15 and the average family size was 2.56.

The median age in the village was 50.5 years. 10.7% of residents were under the age of 18; 3.6% were between the ages of 18 and 24; 17.8% were from 25 to 44; 25.1% were from 45 to 64; and 42.9% were 65 years of age or older. The gender makeup of the village was 60.7% male and 39.3% female.

=== 2000 census ===
As of the census of 2000, there were 50 people, 15 households, and 13 families residing in the village. The population density was 798.5 inhabitants per square mile (308.3/km^{2}). There were 16 housing units at an average density of 255.5 per square mile (98.6/km^{2}). The racial makeup of the village was 78.00% White, 16.00% Native American, 6.00% from other races. Hispanic or Latino of any race were 10.00% of the population.

There were 15 households, out of which 40.0% had children under the age of 18 living with them, 73.3% were married couples living together, 6.7% had a female householder with no husband present, and 13.3% were non-families. 13.3% of all households were made up of individuals, and none had someone living alone who was 65 years of age or older. The average household size was 3.33 and the average family size was 3.54.

In the village, the population was spread out, with 38.0% under the age of 18, 32.0% from 25 to 44, 14.0% from 45 to 64, and 16.0% who were 65 years of age or older. The median age was 36 years. For every 100 females, there were 92.3 males. For every 100 females age 18 and over, there were 121.4 males.

As of 2000 the median income for a household in the village was $40,625, and the median income for a family was $33,750. Males had a median income of $11,563 versus $15,000 for females. The per capita income for the village was $10,009. There were 8.3% of families and 15.6% of the population living below the poverty line, including 16.7% of under eighteens and none of those over 64.

== Education ==
It is in Falls City Public Schools.
