= Ioway Reservation =

Coordinates: 39°59′41″N 95°23′11″W

Iowa Reservation
- Indian reservation
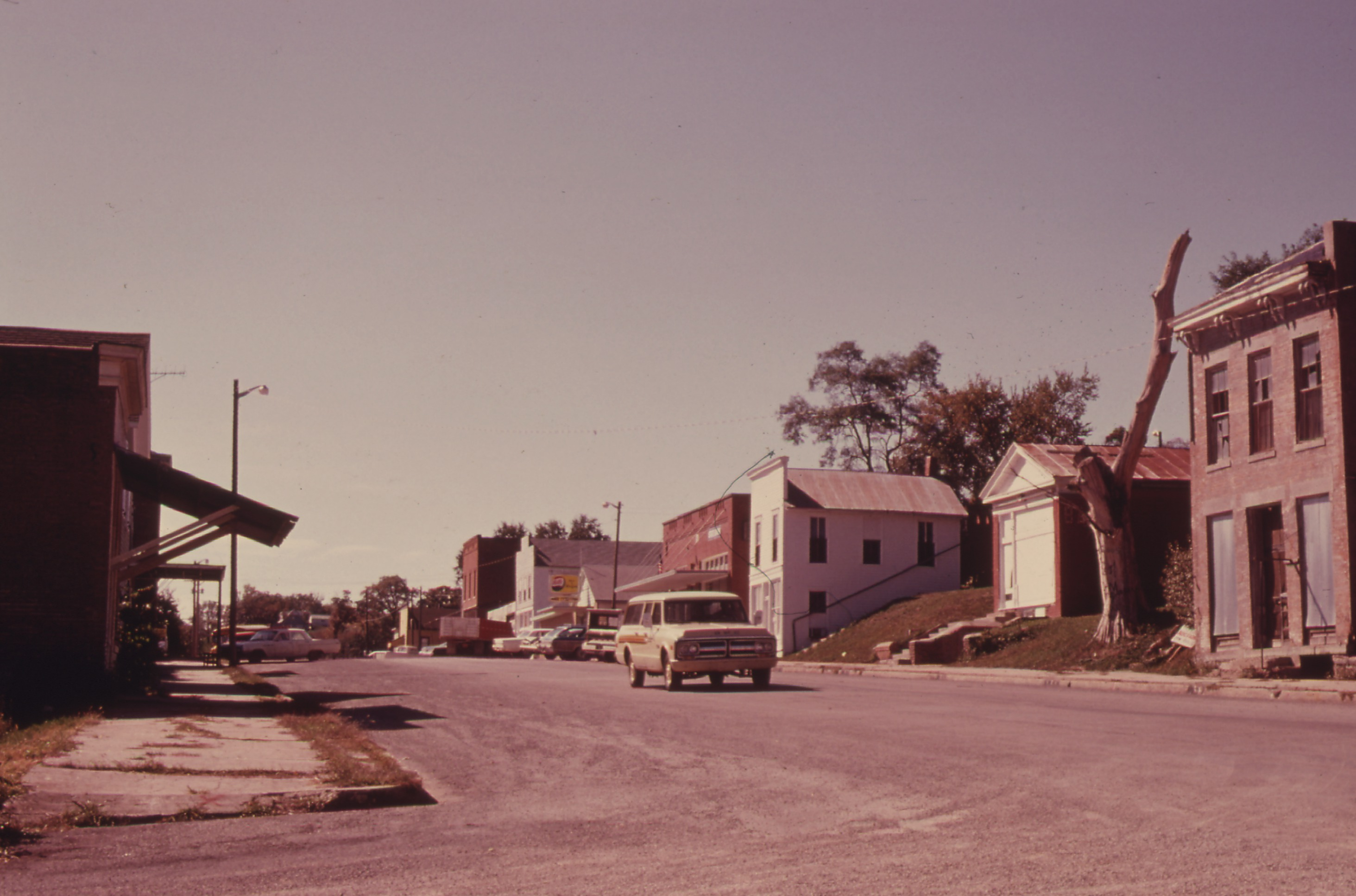
- City of White Cloud, 1974

- Location in Kansas and Nebraska
- Tribe: Iowa Tribe of Kansas and Nebraska
- Country: United States
- States: Kansas; Nebraska
- Counties: Brown; Doniphan; Richardson
- Headquarters: White Cloud

Government
  - Body: Executive Committee
  - Chairman: Timothy Rhodd
  - Vice-Chairman: Alan Kelley
  - Secretary: Anthony Fee

Area
  - Total: 12,000 acres (4,900 ha)

Population (2017)
  - Total: 162
  - Density: 8.6/sq mi (3.3/km^{2})
- Website: iowatribeofkansasandnebraska.com

The Iowa Reservation of the Iowa Tribe of Kansas and Nebraska straddles the borders of southeast Richardson County in southeastern Nebraska and Brown and Doniphan counties in northeastern Kansas. Tribal headquarters are west of White Cloud, Kansas. The reservation was defined in a treaty from March 1861. As of 2023, the tribe operates Casino White Cloud on the reservation.

== History ==
The Iowa (or Ioway or Báxoje, their endonym) Tribe originated in the Great Lakes region. They migrated south and west into Missouri, but were relocated to Kansas under the provisions of the Platte Purchase of 1836. Subsequent treaties in 1854 and 1861 further reduced the Iowa land holdings to the "Diminished Reserve." A band of Iowas left the reservation for Indian Territory beginning in 1878. They became the Iowa Tribe of Oklahoma. The bands that stayed became the Iowa Tribe of Kansas and Nebraska.

Today, the Iowa reservation consists of 12,000 acres (49 km^{2}) that are almost evenly divided between the states of Kansas and Nebraska. The reservation includes parts of Brown counties in Kansas and Richardson County in Nebraska.

== Size ==
Located along the Missouri River, the reservation was once approximately 2,100-acre (8.5 km^{2}) reservation includes 280 acres (1.1 km^{2}) owned by the Tribe and 210.06 acres (0.8501 km^{2}) in tribal member allotments. There were 947.63 acres (3.8349 km^{2}) owned by the Tribe in Kansas, with an additional 181.01 acres (0.7325 km^{2}) in tribal member allotments. In 1995 Bureau of Indian Affairs indicated that were 1,618.7 acres (6.551 km^{2}) of Iowa tribal lands in trust status.

== Activities ==
The tribe farms 1,077 acres (4.36 km^{2}), with portions of the remaining acres balanced between in pastures and woods. There is also a haying operation that supports 150 cattle. The tribe also owns and operates Casino White Cloud and a service station, and employs 186 people. As a sovereign nation the reservation has its own police and fire department, tribal court, health clinic, community health representatives, a senior citizen center, and meal site for seniors with a delivery program. The tribe sponsors a Fourth of July rodeo, a demolition derby in August, and the Iowa Tribe Powwow each September.

== See also ==
- Native American tribes in Nebraska
- Native American tribes in Kansas (category)
- Ioway Tribal National Park
