= Falls City Public Schools =

School district in Nebraska, United States

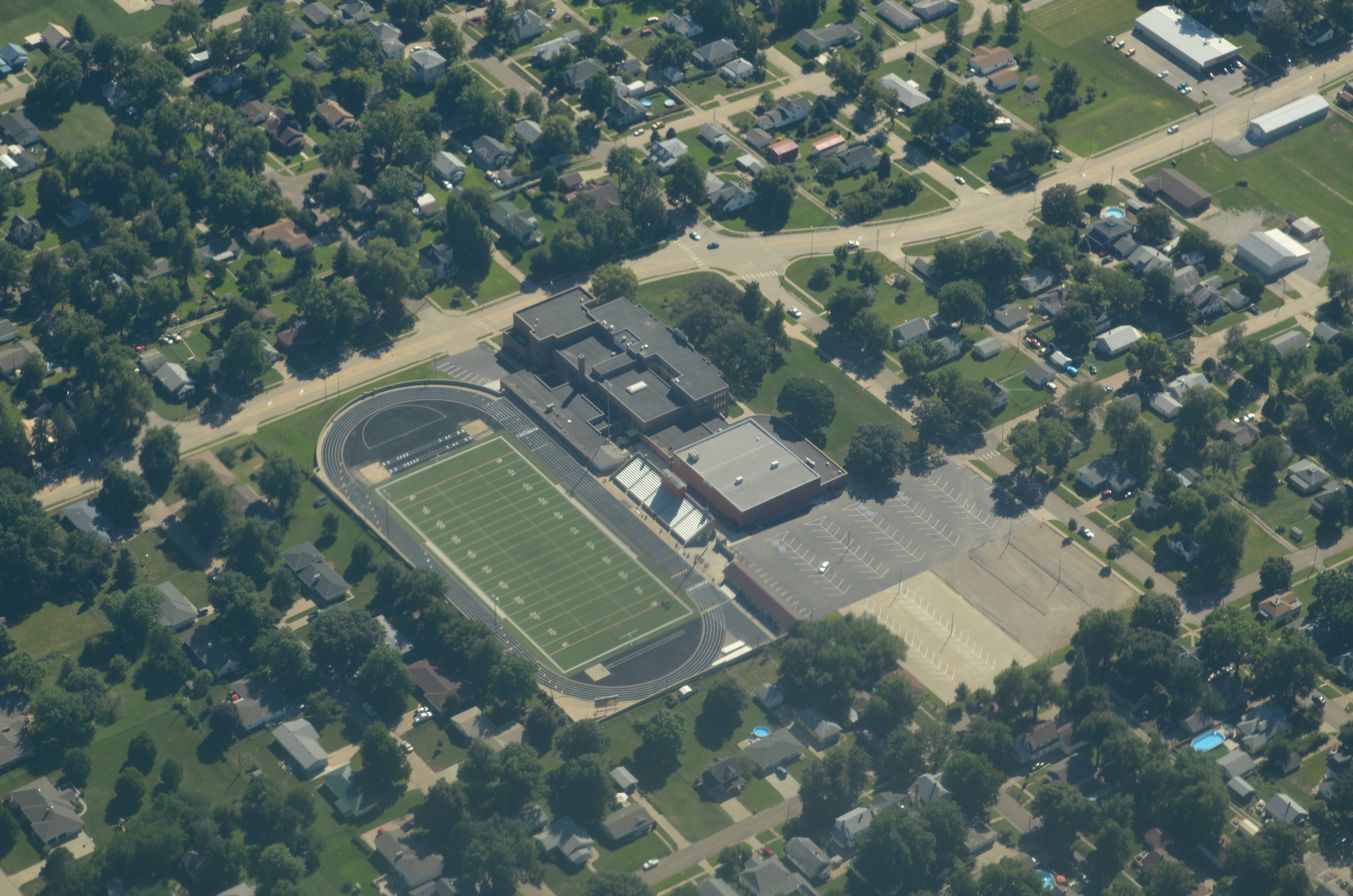
Falls City High School

Falls City Public Schools is a school district headquartered in Falls City, Nebraska.

Within Richardson County, in addition to Falls City, the district includes Preston, Rulo, Salem, and Verdon, as well as portions of Barada. The district extends into sections of Nemaha County.

== History ==
In 2004 the district absorbed portions of the former Dawson-Verdon Public Schools. Falls City was to take about 33% of the students.

The district formerly used the "Second Step Curriculum", but after parental complaints, the curriculum was suspended in May 2022.

== Schools ==
- Falls City High School
- Falls City Middle School
- Falls City North Elementary School
- Falls City South Elementary School
