= Antonine Barada =

American folk hero (1807–1885)

- Mo shi-no pazhi
- Antoine Barada and wife, Elizabeth Robidoux; Mary Kihega, Lena Kihega
- Born: August 22, 1807; St. Marys, Iowa
- Died: March 30, 1885 (aged 77); Barada, Nebraska
- Other name: Antoine Barada
- Occupation: Trader
- Known for: Folk Hero, Legendary Strength

Antonine Barada (August 22, 1807 – March 30, 1885), alternatively spelled Antoine Barada, was an American folk hero in the state of Nebraska; son of an Omaha mother, he was also called Mo shi-no pazhi in the tribal language. While Barada was a historic man, contemporary accounts of his prodigious strength helped establish him as a regional legend, in the mold of Paul Bunyan and Febold Feboldson. Barada's exploits have been counted as fakelore by historians.

== Early life ==
Antoine Barada was born in 1807 at St. Marys, Iowa, which was once located across the Missouri River from Nemaha County, Nebraska. His parents were Michel Barada, a French-American fur trapper and interpreter, and Ta-ing-the-hae, or "Laughing Buffalo", a full-blood Omaha and sister to the chief. His namesake grandfather, Antoine Barada, Sr. (1739–1782), was born in Gascony, France, and was one of the first settlers of St. Louis, Missouri.

In 1813 Antoine was abducted by the Lakota while the family lived near Fort Lisa (Nebraska). Six months later he was returned, after Michel Barada paid the ransom of two ponies. His father immediately sent the boy to live with an aunt in St. Louis. At the age of nine, Antoine returned to the Plains with an Indian hunting party.

As a young man, Antoine Barada married Marcellite Vient, a French woman from St. Louis. In 1856 they returned to Nebraska to settle on the Nemaha Half-Breed Reservation; because of his half-Omaha ancestry, Barada was eligible for a land patent from the US government. He set up a trading post at the reservation, from which the town of Barada grew. He and his wife settled 15 miles (24 km) northeast of Falls City, Nebraska.

== Legend ==
Barada's myth is widely known in Nebraska. In Love Song to the Plains, the early 20th-century Pulitzer Prize-winning writer Mari Sandoz stated, "'Toine Barada stories were told as far as the upper Yellowstone." In the 1930s, Louise Pound of the Federal Writers' Project of the Works Progress Administration collected dozens of stories about Barada, many of which are repeated today. One tale reported, "He was once matched to wrestle with Jean Palos, a Greek wrestling champion... The mighty Palos was notorious for his rough treatment of an opponent. Antonine won the match by pinching his opponent with his toes while he slapped him into unconsciousness with one blow on his ear."

Barada was known as a huge man, commonly thought to be almost 7 ft (2.1 m) tall and widely regarded as a giant. His strength was well known as well, and he was always asked to assist with barn raising, as he would single-handedly hold heavy beams in place while they were fastened down. When local farmers needed assistance loading hogs for market, they would also call on Barada. Rather than use a loading chute, Barada simply picked the hogs up and set them in the wagon. Every time townsfolk needed someone's strength, Barada took the call.

In 1832 Barada was in St. Louis when he was challenged to prove his strength. He lifted a stone weighing 1,700 pounds, after which point the date of the feat and the weight were inscribed on the stone for future generations. The stone is purported to still stand there. Barada was also widely regarded for his marksmanship. Lore recorded his ability to shoot prairie chickens on the fly from horseback, as well as the ability to shoot two quail from every covey. He was known as a fair hunter, one who never shot a bird on the ground.

One tale of Barada recounted that while working with a lazy railroad crew in Nebraska, Barada became upset. He grabbed the drop hammer and threw it across the Missouri River, at which point the earth where the hammer fell buckled. The hammer fall created Nebraska's Missouri River breaks. Barada was still angry and slammed his fist down on a pile. It was driven so far into the soil that it pierced a water table. Legend says that all of Nebraska would have flooded from this bung hole if Antoine Barada hadn't plugged it by sitting over it. Antonine was also purportedly involved in the Underground Railroad. Known as the "Lifeguard of the Missouri", Barada supposedly saved many slaves from drowning by personally carrying them across the Missouri River from the state of Missouri into Nebraska.

== Half-Breed Tract ==
Barada received a patent on 320 acres (1.3 km^{2}) of land in 1856 on the Nemaha Half-Breed Reservation. The town of Barada was established in that tract soon after Barada's claim. Barada ran a fur-trading post there for at least 20 years, during which time the town grew around him.

== Death ==
Barada died in 1885 and is buried alongside his wife in the Catholic cemetery just east of Barada, the village that bears his name.

In 1951 several of Barada's descendants were members of a lawsuit brought against the Government of the United States for recognition of their descent from a full tribal member of the Omaha nation, and their entitlement to compensation related to land allotments and financial benefits received by tribal members. According to the suit, in the 1870s Barada applied to the tribe for membership based on his maternal ancestry. He was rejected due to discriminatory practices by tribal elders and Indian agents. Unlike many Native American tribes, the Omaha have a patrilineal system of descent, so may have rejected Barada because of his French-American father. They considered children with European/white fathers to be "white" and did not accept them into the tribe unless they were officially adopted.

In the 1951 case, the Indian Claims Commission acknowledged there might have been discrimination by the tribe against certain mixed-blood descendants such as Barada; however, the court dismissed the case on the grounds that the Indian Claims Commission did not have jurisdiction over a group claim of individual members; rather, its responsibilities were to adjudicate claims of tribes against the government. The federal government has continued to defer to the federally recognized tribes' sovereignty to determine their own rules for membership and eligibility for voting and benefits.

== Bibliography ==
- Sandage, S.A. (2008) Half-Breed Creek: A Tall Tale of Race on the Frontier, 1804–1941. Announcement
