= Verdon, Nebraska =

Village in Richardson County, Nebraska, United States

- Village
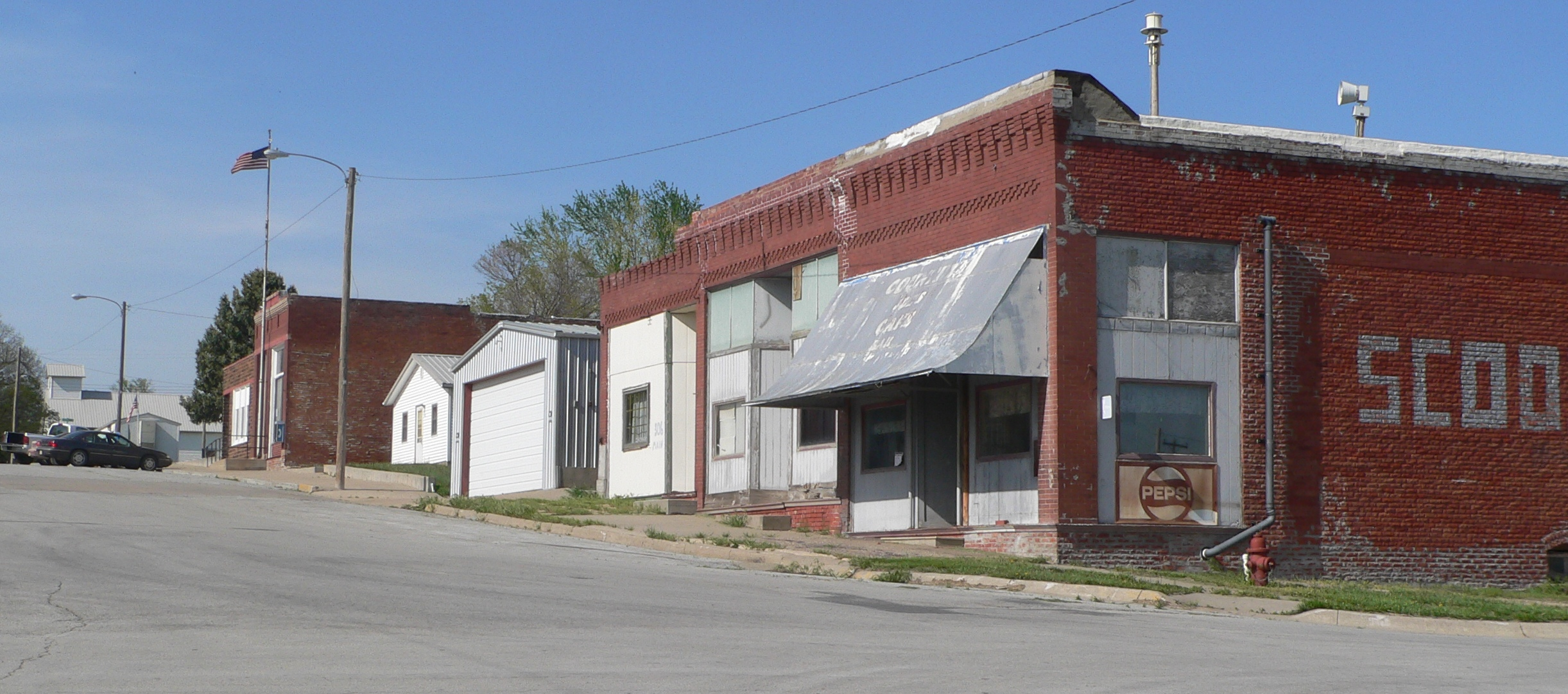
- Main Street in Verdon, May 2014

- Location of Verdon, Nebraska
- Coordinates: 40°08′57″N 95°42′40″W
- Country: United States
- State: Nebraska
- County: Richardson

Area
  - Total: 0.24 sq mi (0.61 km^{2})
  - Land: 0.24 sq mi (0.61 km^{2})
  - Water: 0 sq mi (0.00 km^{2})
- Elevation: 974 ft (297 m)

Population (2020)
  - Total: 164
  - Estimate (2021): 162
  - Density: 700/sq mi (270/km^{2})
- Time zone: UTC-6 (Central (CST))
  - Summer (DST): UTC-5 (CDT)
- ZIP codes: 68433, 68457
- Area code: 402
- FIPS code: 31-50510
- GNIS feature ID: 2400056

Verdon is a village in Richardson County, Nebraska, United States. The population was 164 at the 2020 census.

== History ==
Verdon was platted in 1882. Its name is derived from the word "verdure", which means the greenness of vegetables.

== Geography ==
Verdon is located at 40°8′53″N 95°42′40″W (40.147950, -95.711007).

According to the United States Census Bureau, the village has a total area of 0.24 square miles (0.62 km^{2}), all land.

== Demographics ==
Historical population
Census	Pop.	Note	%±
1890	253		—
1900	340		34.4%
1910	406		19.4%
1920	347		−14.5%
1930	355		2.3%
1940	397		11.8%
1950	366		−7.8%
1960	267		−27.0%
1970	265		−0.7%
1980	278		4.9%
1990	242		−12.9%
2000	223		−7.9%
2010	172		−22.9%
2020	164		−4.7%
2021 (est.)	162	▼	−1.2%
U.S. Decennial Census

=== 2010 census ===
As of the census of 2010, there were 172 people, 84 households, and 51 families residing in the village. The population density was 716.7 inhabitants per square mile (276.7/km^{2}). There were 104 housing units at an average density of 433.3 per square mile (167.3/km^{2}). The racial makeup of the village was 97.1% White, 1.2% Native American, 0.6% from other races, and 1.2% from two or more races. Hispanic or Latino of any race were 2.9% of the population.

There were 84 households, of which 16.7% had children under the age of 18 living with them, 48.8% were married couples living together, 6.0% had a female householder with no husband present, 6.0% had a male householder with no wife present, and 39.3% were non-families. 32.1% of all households were made up of individuals, and 19% had someone living alone who was 65 years of age or older. The average household size was 2.05 and the average family size was 2.53.

The median age in the village was 50.2 years. 14% of residents were under the age of 18; 7.5% were between the ages of 18 and 24; 19.1% were from 25 to 44; 29.7% were from 45 to 64; and 29.7% were 65 years of age or older. The gender makeup of the village was 52.3% male and 47.7% female.

=== 2000 census ===
As of the census of 2000, there were 223 people, 90 households, and 61 families residing in the village. The population density was 931.8 inhabitants per square mile (359.8/km^{2}). There were 95 housing units at an average density of 397.0 per square mile (153.3/km^{2}). The racial makeup of the village was 95.96% White, and 4.04% from two or more races. Hispanic or Latino of any race were 0.90% of the population.

There were 90 households, out of which 30.0% had children under the age of 18 living with them, 58.9% were married couples living together, 6.7% had a female householder with no husband present, and 32.2% were non-families. 28.9% of all households were made up of individuals, and 12.2% had someone living alone who was 65 years of age or older. The average household size was 2.48 and the average family size was 3.10.

In the village, the population was spread out, with 28.3% under the age of 18, 1.8% from 18 to 24, 26.5% from 25 to 44, 25.6% from 45 to 64, and 17.9% who were 65 years of age or older. The median age was 40 years. For every 100 females, there were 100.9 males. For every 100 females age 18 and over, there were 113.3 males.

As of 2000 the median income for a household in the village was $26,250, and the median income for a family was $31,250. Males had a median income of $26,250 versus $19,583 for females. The per capita income for the village was $11,733. About 16.7% of families and 19.2% of the population were below the poverty line, including 27.3% of those under the age of eighteen and 25.6% of those 65 or over.

== Education ==
Its school district is the Falls City Public Schools.

Dawson-Verdon Public Schools was its school district until 2004.

== See also ==
- List of municipalities in Nebraska
