= Richardson County, Nebraska =

County in Nebraska, United States

- County
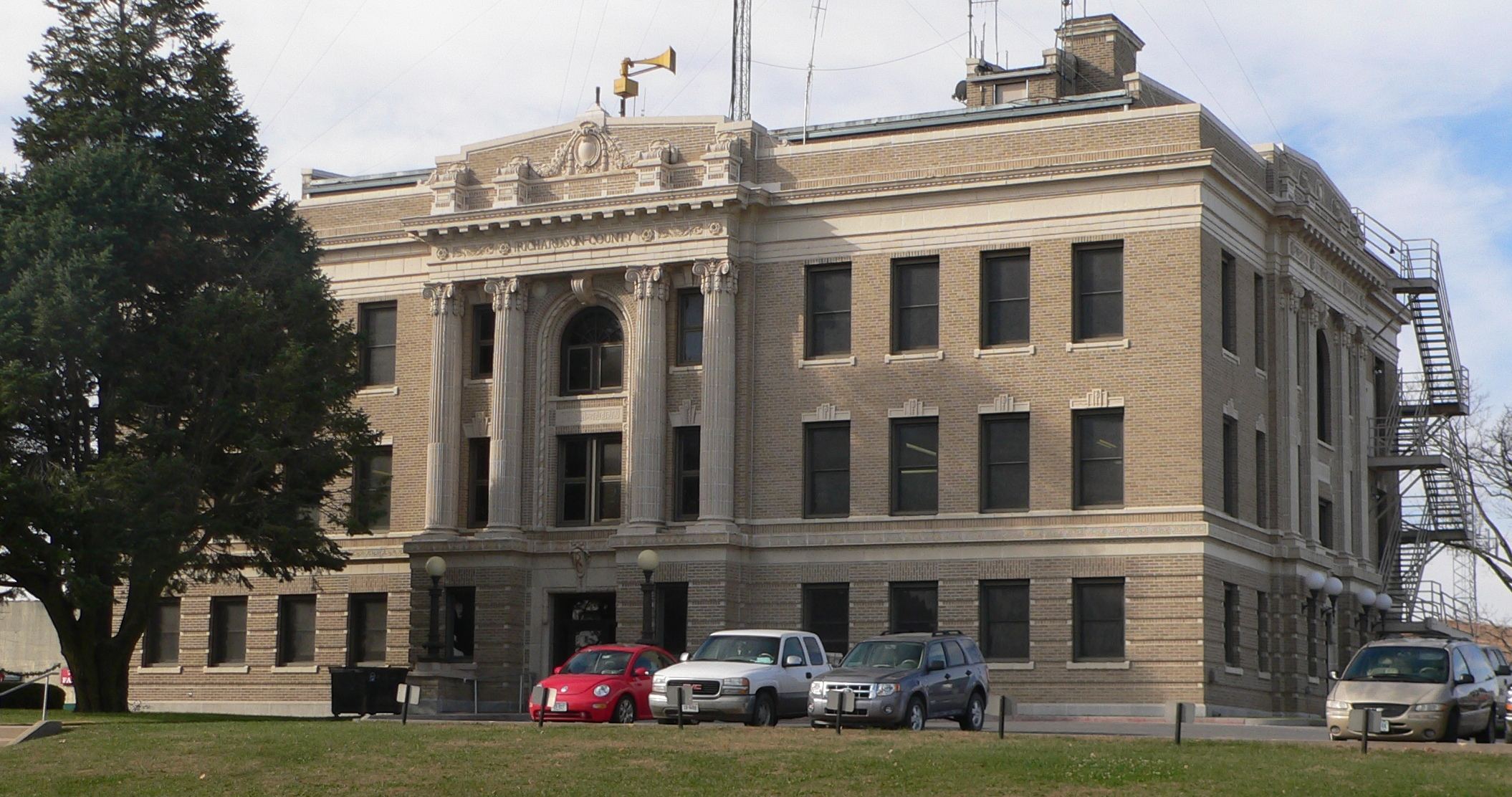
- Richardson County Courthouse in Falls City

- Location within the U.S. state of Nebraska
- Coordinates: 40°07′N 95°43′W
- Country: United States
- State: Nebraska
- Founded: 1854 (founded); 1855 (re-authorized)
- Named for: William Alexander Richardson
- Seat: Falls City
- Largest city: Falls City

Area
  - Total: 555 sq mi (1,440 km^{2})
  - Land: 552 sq mi (1,430 km^{2})
  - Water: 2.7 sq mi (7.0 km^{2}) 0.5%

Population (2020)
  - Total: 7,871
  - Estimate (2025): 7,530 ▼
  - Density: 14.3/sq mi (5.51/km^{2})
- Time zone: UTC−6 (Central)
  - Summer (DST): UTC−5 (CDT)
- Congressional district: 1st
- Website: richardsoncounty.ne.gov

Richardson County is the easternmost county in the U.S. state of Nebraska. As of the 2020 census, the population was 7,871. Its county seat is Falls City.

In the Nebraska license plate system, Richardson County is represented by the prefix 19 (it had the nineteenth-largest number of vehicles registered in the county when the license plate system was established in 1922).

Parts of the Ioway Reservation and the Sac and Fox Reservation are located in the southeast corner of the county between Falls City, Rulo (Nebraska), and Hiawatha (Kansas). The incorporated village of Preston, Nebraska is located inside the latter reservation.

== History ==
The Nebraska Territory, including this county, was opened for settlement through the Kansas–Nebraska Act on May 30, 1854. Richardson County was created that same year and reorganized in 1855 by the first territorial legislature. It was named after William A. Richardson, a US Representative from the state of Illinois who had sponsored the Kansas-Nebraska Act; subsequently, in 1858, Richardson was appointed governor of the Nebraska Territory.

The first courthouse was built in 1863. The second courthouse was built in 1873 and burned on May 7, 1919.

On May 30, 1879, the "Irving, Kansas Tornado" passed through Richardson County. This tornado measured F4 on the Fujita scale, and had a damage path 800 yards (730 m) wide and 100 miles (160 km) long. Eighteen people were killed and sixty were injured in this tornado.

In the summer of 1966, Braniff Airlines Flight 250 crashed near Falls City due to bad weather, killing all 42 on board. The BAC One-Eleven aircraft was on the Kansas City to Omaha leg of a multi-stop flight from New Orleans to Minneapolis on Saturday night, August 6, 1966.

== Geography ==
Richardson County lies at the southeast tip of Nebraska. Its east boundary line abuts the west boundary line of the state of Missouri (across the Missouri River). Its south boundary line abuts the north boundary line of the state of Kansas. Several branches and tributaries of the Big Nemaha River flow southeast through the county, depositing their waters into the Missouri River at the county's SE corner. The county's terrain consists of rolling hills, sloped to the southeast, cut by numerous drainages. The county area is largely devoted to agriculture. The lowest point in the state of Nebraska is located on the Missouri River in Richardson County, where it flows out of Nebraska and into Kansas and Missouri.

The county has a total area of 555 square miles (1,440 km^{2}), of which 552 square miles (1,430 km^{2}) is land and 2.7 square miles (7.0 km^{2}) (0.5%) is water.

=== Major highways ===
The major highways through the area are U.S. Highway 73 and U.S. Highway 75 running north and south through the county, U.S. Highway 159 running east toward the Rulo bridge (and connecting to the state of Missouri), and Nebraska Highway 8 running west along the southern border of Nebraska. Other state highways provide connections between smaller towns.

- U.S. Highway 73
- U.S. Highway 75
- U.S. Highway 159
- Nebraska Highway 8
- Nebraska Highway 62
- Nebraska Highway 67
- Nebraska Highway 105

=== Protected areas ===
- Four Mile Creek State Wildlife Management Area
- Indian Cave State Park (part)
- Kirkmans Cove Recreation Area
- Verdon Lake State Recreation Area

=== Adjacent counties ===
- Nemaha County - north
- Holt County, Missouri - east
- Doniphan County, Kansas - southeast
- Brown County, Kansas - south
- Nemaha County, Kansas - southwest
- Pawnee County - west

== Demographics ==
Historical population
Census	Pop.	Note	%±
1860	2,835		—
1870	9,780		245.0%
1880	15,031		53.7%
1890	17,574		16.9%
1900	19,614		11.6%
1910	17,448		−11.0%
1920	18,968		8.7%
1930	19,826		4.5%
1940	19,178		−3.3%
1950	16,886		−12.0%
1960	13,903		−17.7%
1970	12,277		−11.7%
1980	11,315		−7.8%
1990	9,937		−12.2%
2000	9,531		−4.1%
2010	8,363		−12.3%
2020	7,871		−5.9%
2025 (est.)	7,530	▼	−4.3%
US Decennial Census; 1790-1960 1900-1990; 1990-2000 2010

=== 2020 census ===
As of the 2020 census, the county had a population of 7,871. The median age was 47.2 years. 21.6% of residents were under the age of 18 and 24.9% of residents were 65 years of age or older. For every 100 females there were 100.4 males, and for every 100 females age 18 and over there were 96.4 males age 18 and over.

The racial makeup of the county was 90.9% White, 0.3% Black or African American, 2.9% American Indian and Alaska Native, 0.5% Asian, 0.0% Native Hawaiian and Pacific Islander, 0.3% from some other race, and 5.2% from two or more races. Hispanic or Latino residents of any race comprised 2.0% of the population.

52.5% of residents lived in urban areas, while 47.5% lived in rural areas.

There were 3,460 households in the county, of which 24.9% had children under the age of 18 living with them and 24.8% had a female householder with no spouse or partner present. About 33.8% of all households were made up of individuals and 18.0% had someone living alone who was 65 years of age or older.

There were 4,083 housing units, of which 15.3% were vacant. Among occupied housing units, 75.9% were owner-occupied and 24.1% were renter-occupied. The homeowner vacancy rate was 3.0% and the rental vacancy rate was 12.3%.

=== 2000 census ===
As of the 2000 United States census, there were 9,531 people, 3,993 households, and 2,567 families in the county. The population density was 17 people per square mile (6.6 people/km^{2}). There were 4,560 housing units at an average density of 8 units per square mile (3.1/km^{2}). The racial makeup of the county was 95.65% White, 0.19% Black or African American, 2.32% Native American, 0.15% Asian, 0.22% from other races, and 1.48% from two or more races. 1.05% of the population were Hispanic or Latino of any race.

There were 3,993 households, out of which 29.50% had children under the age of 18 living with them, 53.40% were married couples living together, 7.40% had a female householder with no husband present, and 35.70% were non-families. 32.20% of all households were made up of individuals, and 17.70% had someone living alone who was 65 years of age or older. The average household size was 2.34 and the average family size was 2.95.

The county population contained 25.50% under the age of 18, 5.90% from 18 to 24, 23.80% from 25 to 44, 23.30% from 45 to 64, and 21.50% who were 65 years of age or older. The median age was 41 years. For every 100 females there were 93.50 males. For every 100 females age 18 and over, there were 90.00 males.

The median income for a household in the county was $29,884, and the median income for a family was $39,779. Males had a median income of $25,938 versus $18,775 for females. The per capita income for the county was $16,460. About 6.30% of families and 10.10% of the population were below the poverty line, including 10.50% of those under age 18 and 11.50% of those age 65 or over.

== Communities ==
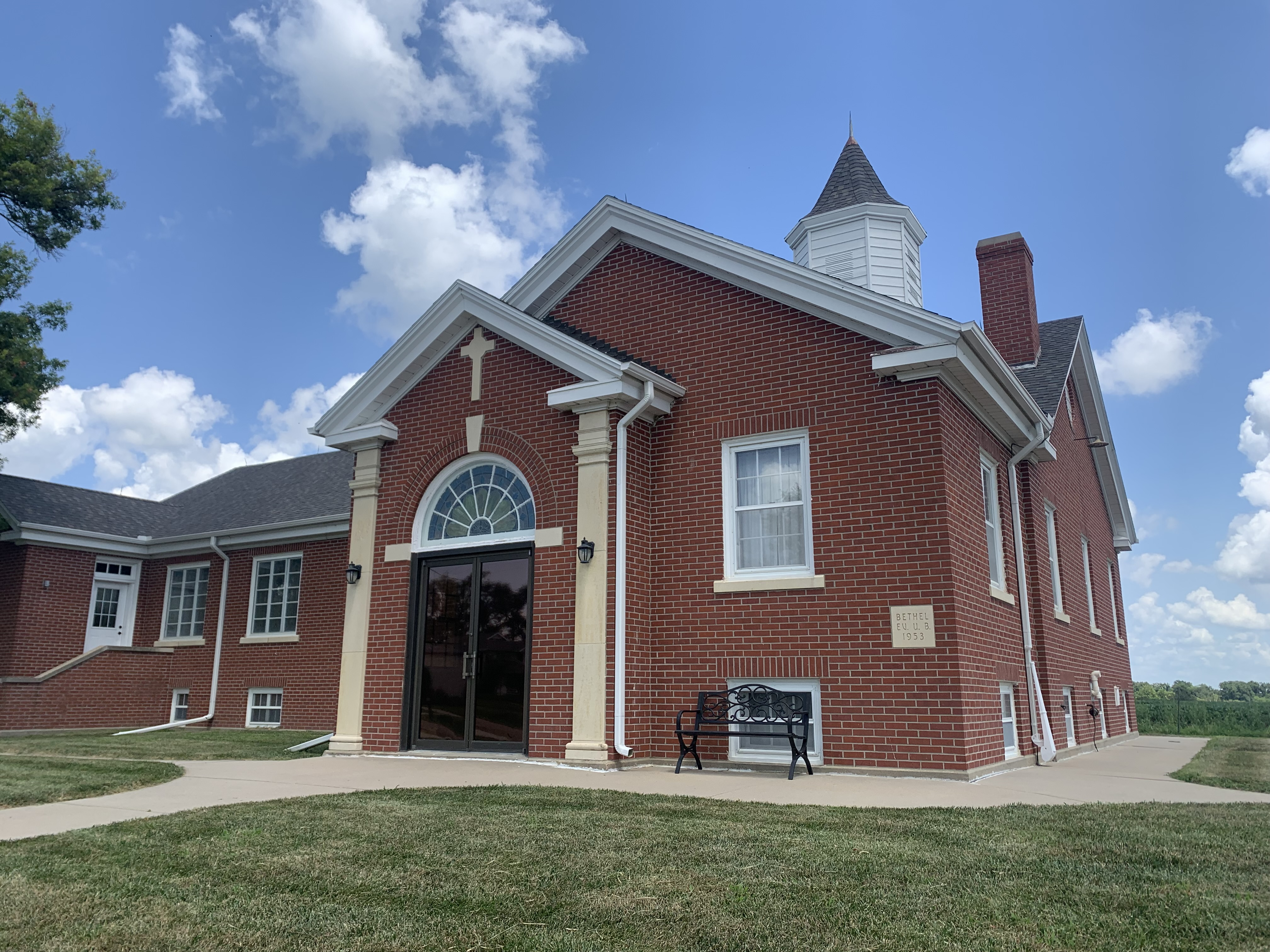
Bethel Global Methodist Church in Jefferson Precinct

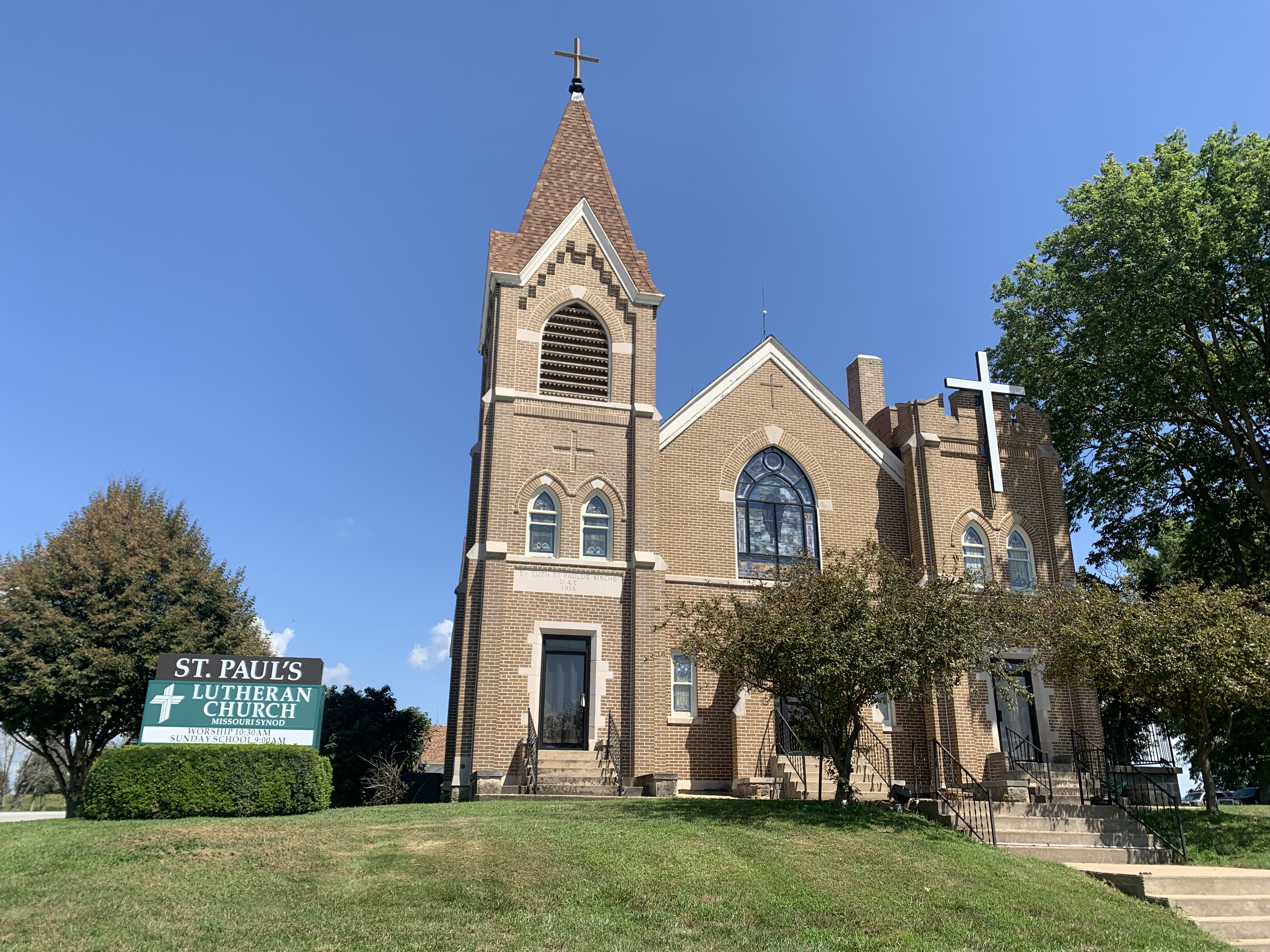
St. Paul's Lutheran Church in Ohio Precinct

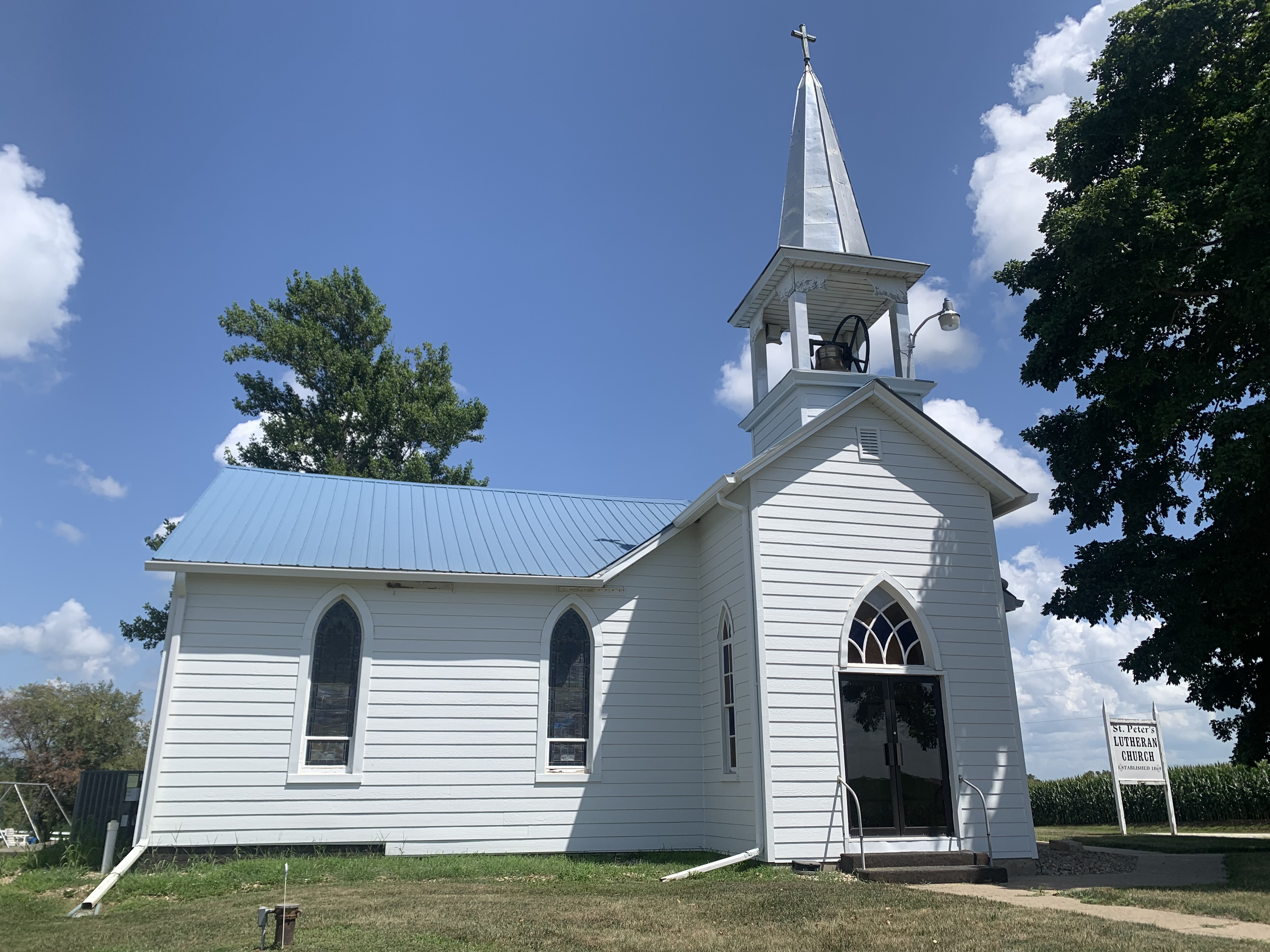
St. Peter's Lutheran Church in Barada Precinct

=== Cities ===
- Falls City (county seat)
- Humboldt

=== Villages ===
- Barada
- Dawson
- Preston
- Rulo
- Salem
- Shubert
- Stella
- Verdon

=== Unincorporated communities ===
- Nim City
- Strausville

=== Former communities ===
- Archer
- Arago
- Mount Roy
- Winnebago
- Yankton

== Politics ==
Richardson County voters have been reliably Republican for decades. In only one national election since 1936 has the county selected the Democratic Party candidate (as of 2024).

United States presidential election results for Richardson County, Nebraska
Year	Republican		Democratic		Third party(ies)	
Year	No.	%	No.	%	No.	%
1900	2,491	49.12%	2,529	49.87%	51	1.01%
1904	2,554	56.83%	1,664	37.03%	276	6.14%
1908	2,123	47.51%	2,258	50.53%	88	1.97%
1912	965	21.70%	1,977	44.45%	1,506	33.86%
1916	2,039	42.30%	2,650	54.98%	131	2.72%
1920	4,496	61.72%	2,679	36.78%	109	1.50%
1924	3,625	48.22%	3,089	41.09%	803	10.68%
1928	5,833	65.09%	3,072	34.28%	57	0.64%
1932	2,802	33.97%	5,383	65.26%	64	0.78%
1936	3,908	40.05%	5,813	59.57%	37	0.38%
1940	4,833	54.07%	4,105	45.93%	0	0.00%
1944	4,482	56.27%	3,483	43.73%	0	0.00%
1948	3,778	51.77%	3,519	48.23%	0	0.00%
1952	5,688	70.66%	2,362	29.34%	0	0.00%
1956	4,480	64.05%	2,514	35.95%	0	0.00%
1960	4,481	62.66%	2,670	37.34%	0	0.00%
1964	2,850	46.76%	3,245	53.24%	0	0.00%
1968	3,133	59.66%	1,591	30.30%	527	10.04%
1972	3,662	70.83%	1,508	29.17%	0	0.00%
1976	3,119	55.43%	2,416	42.94%	92	1.63%
1980	3,634	68.00%	1,350	25.26%	360	6.74%
1984	3,634	71.28%	1,422	27.89%	42	0.82%
1988	2,703	58.02%	1,926	41.34%	30	0.64%
1992	2,050	41.47%	1,513	30.61%	1,380	27.92%
1996	2,089	48.85%	1,517	35.48%	670	15.67%
2000	2,623	63.20%	1,382	33.30%	145	3.49%
2004	2,924	68.35%	1,297	30.32%	57	1.33%
2008	2,342	59.02%	1,513	38.13%	113	2.85%
2012	2,443	65.34%	1,191	31.85%	105	2.81%
2016	2,769	72.77%	818	21.50%	218	5.73%
2020	3,073	74.33%	996	24.09%	65	1.57%
2024	2,962	74.76%	934	23.57%	66	1.67%

== Education ==
School districts include:

- Auburn Public Schools
- Falls City Public Schools
- Humboldt Table Rock Steinauer Public Schools
- Johnson-Brock Public Schools
- Pawnee City Public Schools

== See also ==
- National Register of Historic Places listings in Richardson County, Nebraska
