= Rulo, Nebraska =

Village in Richarson County, Nebraska, United States

- Village
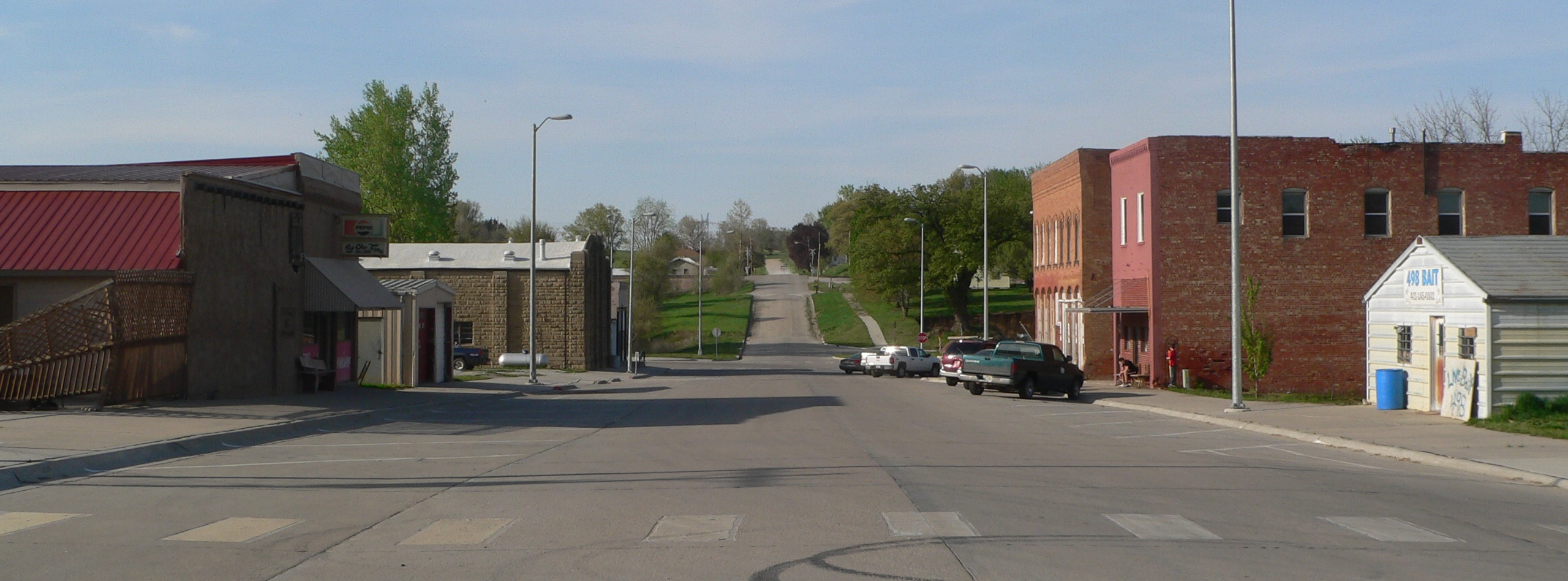
- Downtown Rulo: 1st Street, May 2014

- Location of Rulo within Richardson County and Nebraska
- Coordinates: 40°03′06″N 95°25′50″W
- Country: United States
- State: Nebraska
- County: Richardson

Area
  - Total: 0.63 sq mi (1.63 km^{2})
  - Land: 0.63 sq mi (1.63 km^{2})
  - Water: 0 sq mi (0.00 km^{2})
- Elevation: 971 ft (296 m)

Population (2020)
  - Total: 144
  - Estimate (2021): 142
  - Density: 229/sq mi (88.3/km^{2})
- Time zone: UTC-6 (Central (CST))
  - Summer (DST): UTC-5 (CDT)
- ZIP code: 68431
- Area code: 402
- FIPS code: 31-42670
- GNIS feature ID: 2399140

Rulo is a village in Richardson County, Nebraska, United States. The population was 144 at the 2020 census.

== History ==
Rulo was laid out in 1857. It was named for Charlie Rouleau, the original owner of the town site.

In 1933, the foundation for the Rulo Bridge, a toll bridge across the Missouri River, was laid. The owner of the bridge was originally John Mullen from Falls City, together with a group of investors, the "Kansas City Bridge Company". Construction of the bridge began in 1938, after the Works Progress Administration decided to finance half the cost. The bridge was finished in 1939.

During the early 1980s, a small group of Christian Identity survivalists, led by Michael W. Ryan, began living in a religious cult located on a farm two miles north of Rulo, along the Missouri River. The farm was converted into a compound and the members of the cult would commit thefts throughout the Nebraska-Missouri-Kansas area. The stolen property would be sold in order to buy weapons and survival equipment for the group. Ryan was ultimately convicted and sentenced to death after the Nebraska State Patrol discovered that he was responsible for the torture murders of a 26-year-old cult member and a five-year-old boy. Ryan died of natural causes in prison in 2015.

In 2013, a new bridge carrying U.S. Highway 159 across the Missouri River was opened. The 1939 bridge, deemed too narrow for semi-trailers and farm machinery, was demolished in 2014.

== Demographics ==
Historical population
Census	Pop.	Note	%±
1870	611		—
1880	673		10.1%
1890	786		16.8%
1900	877		11.6%
1910	661		−24.6%
1920	744		12.6%
1930	719		−3.4%
1940	808		12.4%
1950	639		−20.9%
1960	412		−35.5%
1970	299		−27.4%
1980	261		−12.7%
1990	191		−26.8%
2000	226		18.3%
2010	172		−23.9%
2020	145		−15.7%
2021 (est.)	142	▼	−2.1%
U.S. Decennial Census

=== 2010 census ===
As of the census of 2010, there were 172 people, 85 households, and 43 families residing in the village. The population density was 273.0 inhabitants per square mile (105.4/km^{2}). There were 116 housing units at an average density of 184.1 per square mile (71.1/km^{2}). The racial makeup of the village was 70.9% White, 23.8% Native American, 0.6% Pacific Islander, and 4.7% from two or more races. Hispanic or Latino of any race were 0.6% of the population.

There were 85 households, of which 22.4% had children under the age of 18 living with them, 35.3% were married couples living together, 11.8% had a female householder with no husband present, 3.5% had a male householder with no wife present, and 49.4% were non-families. 40.0% of all households were made up of individuals, and 18.9% had someone living alone who was 65 years of age or older. The average household size was 2.02 and the average family size was 2.63.

The median age in the village was 48 years. 18.6% of residents were under the age of 18; 7% were between the ages of 18 and 24; 18.6% were from 25 to 44; 34.4% were from 45 to 64; and 21.5% were 65 years of age or older. The gender makeup of the village was 50.0% male and 50.0% female.

=== 2000 census ===
As of the census of 2000, there were 226 people, 97 households, and 62 families residing in the village. The population density was 359.9 inhabitants per square mile (139.0/km^{2}). There were 132 housing units at an average density of 210.2 per square mile (81.2/km^{2}). The racial makeup of the village was 75.66% White, 23.45% Native American, and 0.88% from two or more races. Hispanic or Latino of any race were 0.44% of the population. In 2006 the population by the United States Census Bureau estimated at 197 [2], a decrease of 29 (-12.8%). The average age was 39.2 years in 2010.

There were 97 households, out of which 24.7% had children under the age of 18 living with them, 49.5% were married couples living together, 13.4% had a female householder with no husband present, and 35.1% were non-families. 29.9% of all households were made up of individuals, and 13.4% had someone living alone who was 65 years of age or older. The average household size was 2.33 and the average family size was 2.86.

The median age in Rulo was 39 years. 24.8% of the residents were under the age of 18; 6.6% were between 18 and 24 years old; 23.9% were aged between 25 and 44; 27.4% from 45 to 64; and 17.3% were 65 years of age or older. For every 100 females, there were 85.2 males. For every 100 females age 18 and over, there were 88.9 males.

As of 2000 the median income for a household in the village was $21,719, and the median income for a family was $30,000. Males had a median income of $20,357 versus $17,292 for females. The per capita income for the village was $11,971. About 20.0% of families and 28.0% of the population were below the poverty line, including 52.5% of those under the age of eighteen and 20.4% of those 65 or over.

== Geography ==
According to the United States Census Bureau, the village has a total area of 0.63 square miles (1.63 km^{2}), all land.

=== Climate ===
Climate data for Rulo, Nebraska
Month	Jan	Feb	Mar	Apr	May	Jun	Jul	Aug	Sep	Oct	Nov	Dec	Year
Record high °F (°C)	71 (22)	80 (27)	90 (32)	96 (36)	101 (38)	107 (42)	109 (43)	109 (43)	104 (40)	96 (36)	83 (28)	75 (24)	109 (43)
Mean daily maximum °F (°C)	35 (2)	42 (6)	54 (12)	66 (19)	77 (25)	87 (31)	92 (33)	89 (32)	81 (27)	68 (20)	51 (11)	38 (3)	65 (18)
Mean daily minimum °F (°C)	14 (−10)	19 (−7)	29 (−2)	40 (4)	51 (11)	61 (16)	65 (18)	62 (17)	53 (12)	42 (6)	29 (−2)	18 (−8)	40 (4)
Record low °F (°C)	−20 (−29)	−18 (−28)	−17 (−27)	8 (−13)	29 (−2)	39 (4)	41 (5)	41 (5)	25 (−4)	12 (−11)	−4 (−20)	−29 (−34)	−29 (−34)
Average precipitation inches (mm)	0.87 (22)	0.95 (24)	2.45 (62)	3.18 (81)	4.33 (110)	3.83 (97)	5.23 (133)	4.30 (109)	3.98 (101)	2.59 (66)	2.34 (59)	1.03 (26)	35.08 (890)
Average snowfall inches (cm)	6.1 (15)	4.9 (12)	3.6 (9.1)	0.8 (2.0)	0 (0)	0 (0)	0 (0)	0 (0)	0 (0)	0.2 (0.51)	1.3 (3.3)	3.7 (9.4)	20.6 (51.31)

== Education ==
It is in Falls City Public Schools.

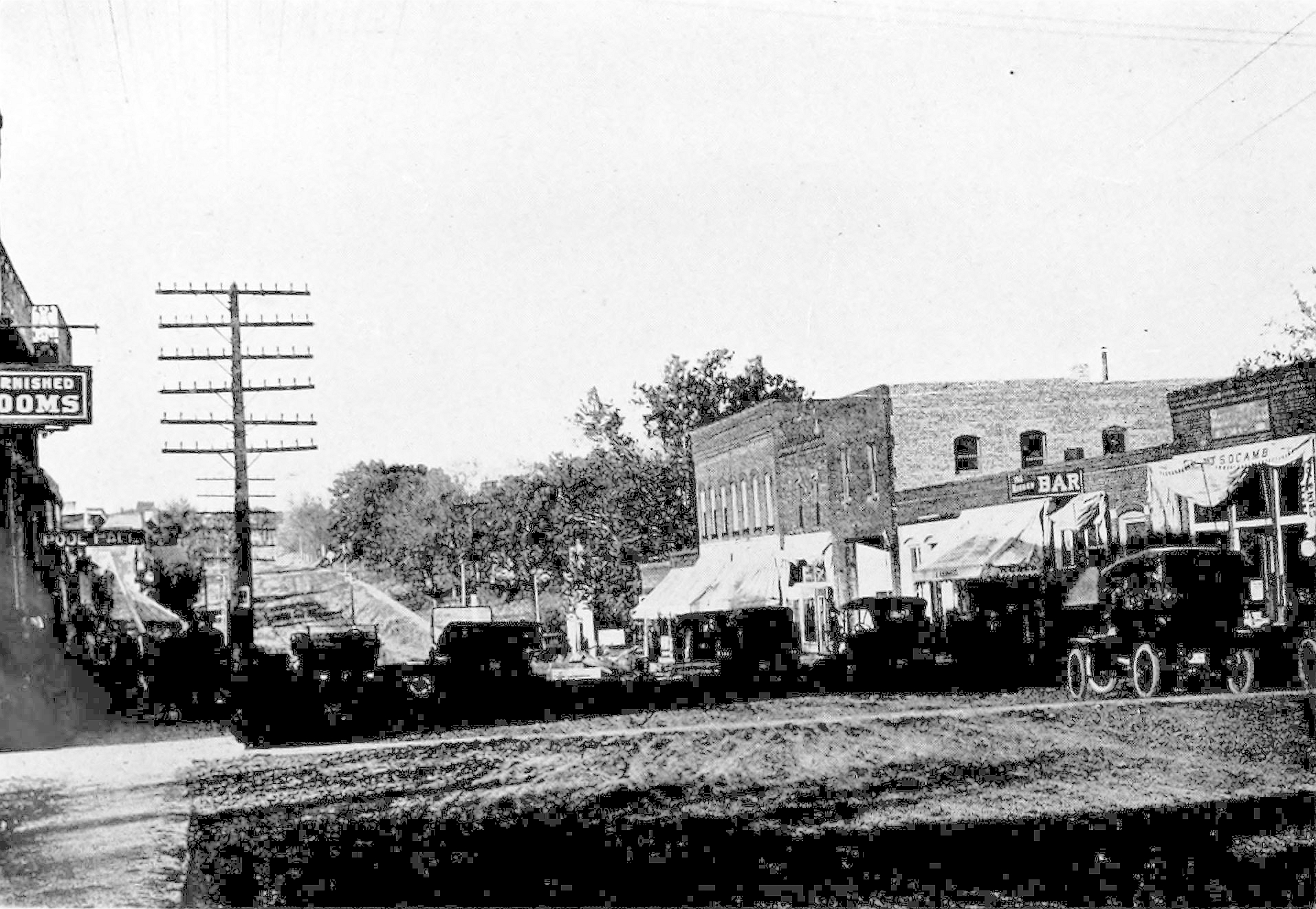
Rulo, 1917

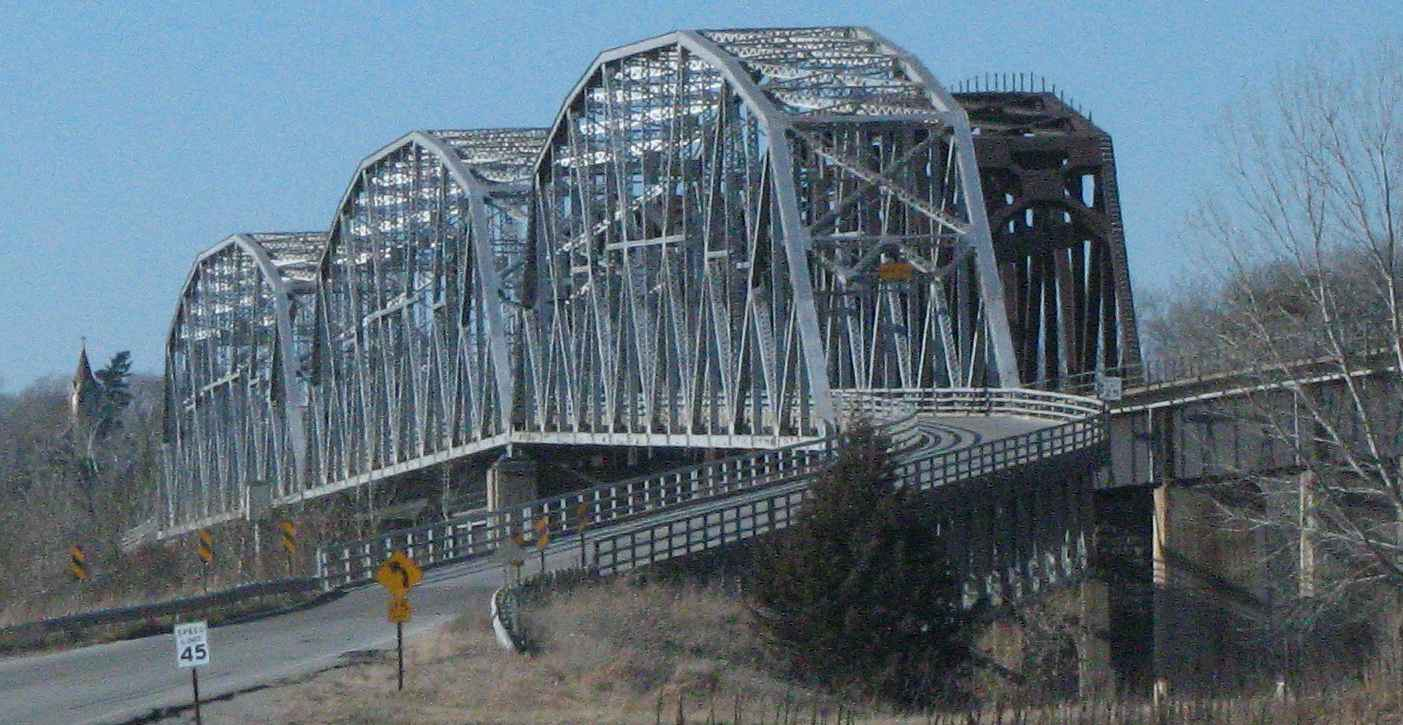
1939 Rulo bridge

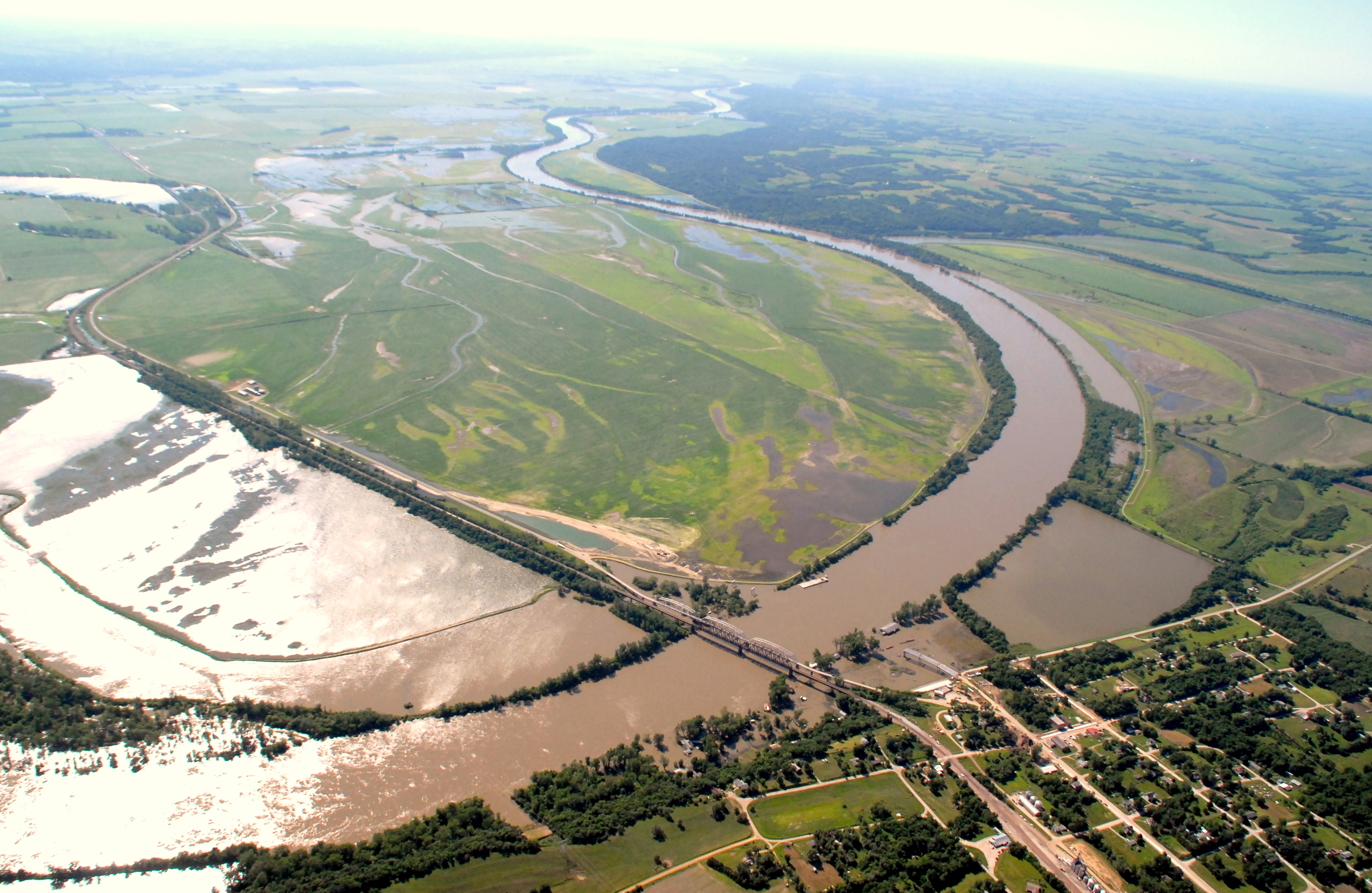
Rulo during the 2011 Missouri River floods

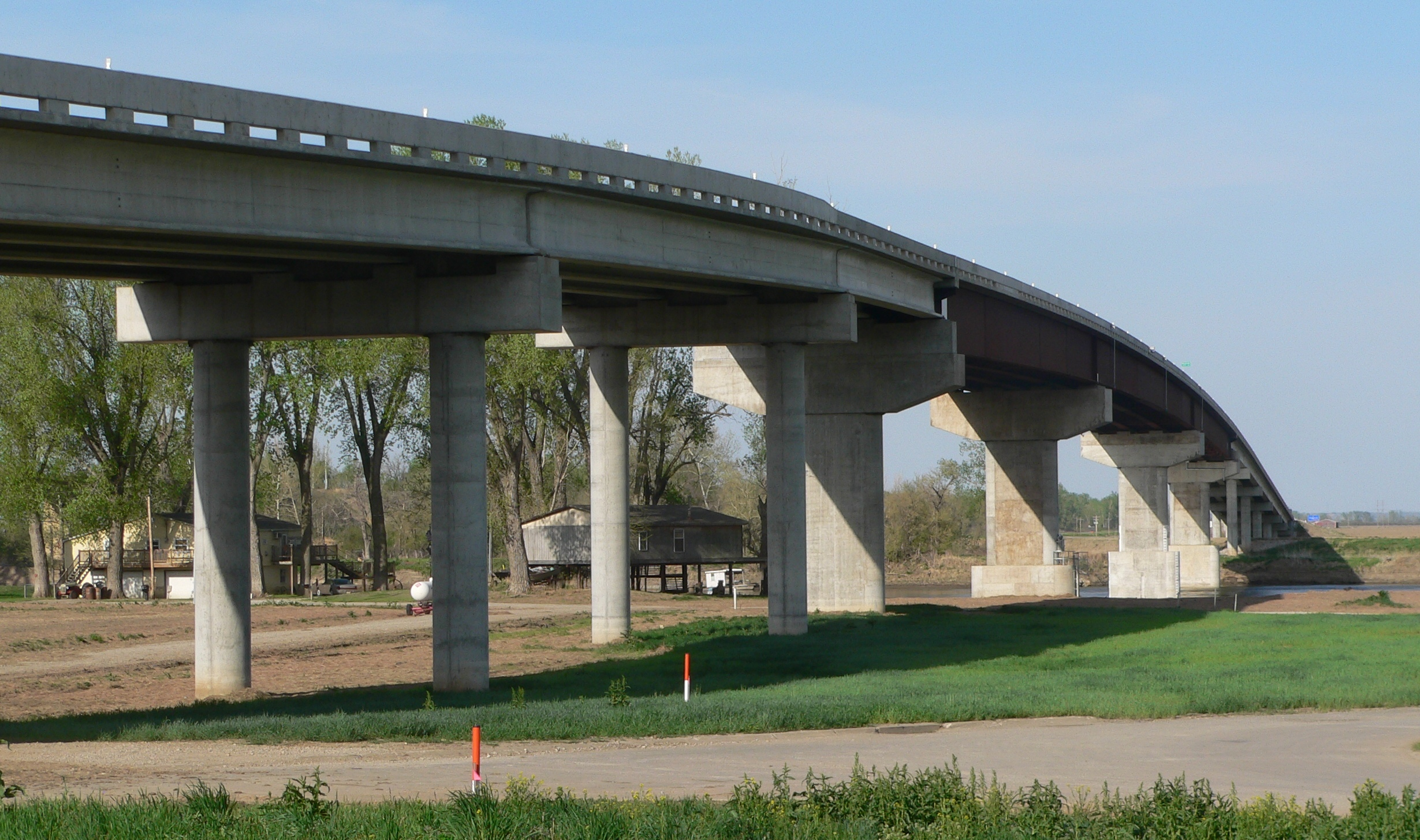
2013 Rulo bridge

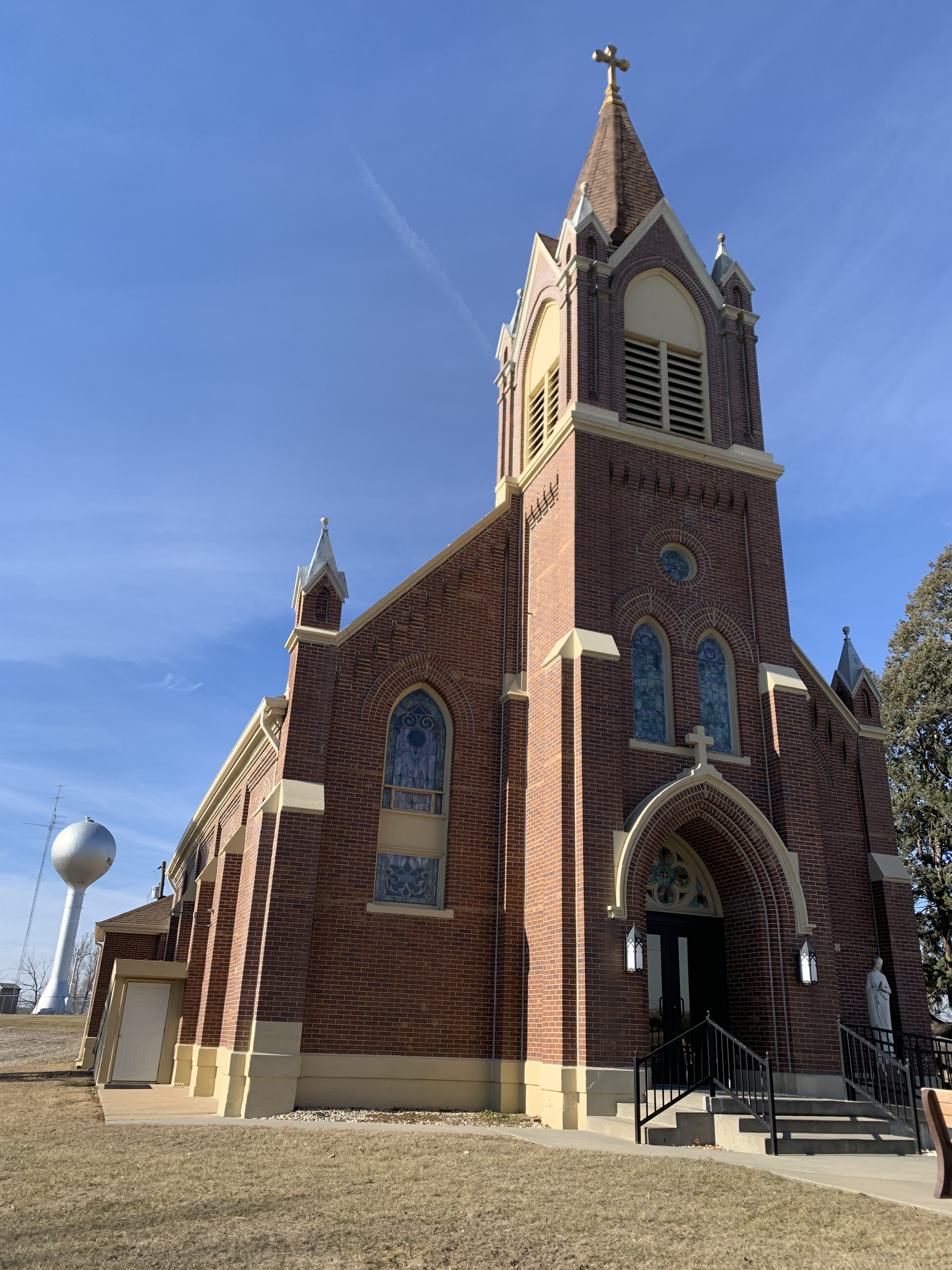
Catholic church in Rulo, NE

== See also ==
- List of municipalities in Nebraska
