= Nemaha River basin =

River basin in Nebraska, United States

Coordinates: 40°07′N 95°39′W

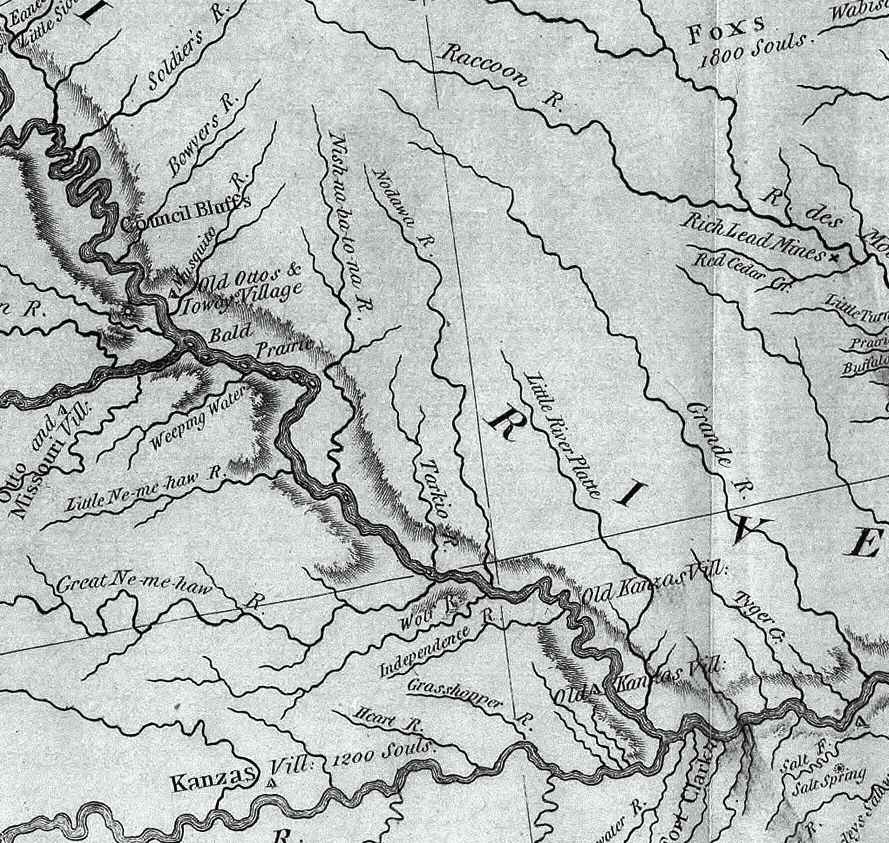
This excerpt from the Lewis and Clark map of 1814 shows the rivers of southwest Iowa, southeast Nebraska, and northwest Missouri. The "Little" and "Great" "Ne-ma-haw" Rivers are seen at the west-central edge of the map.

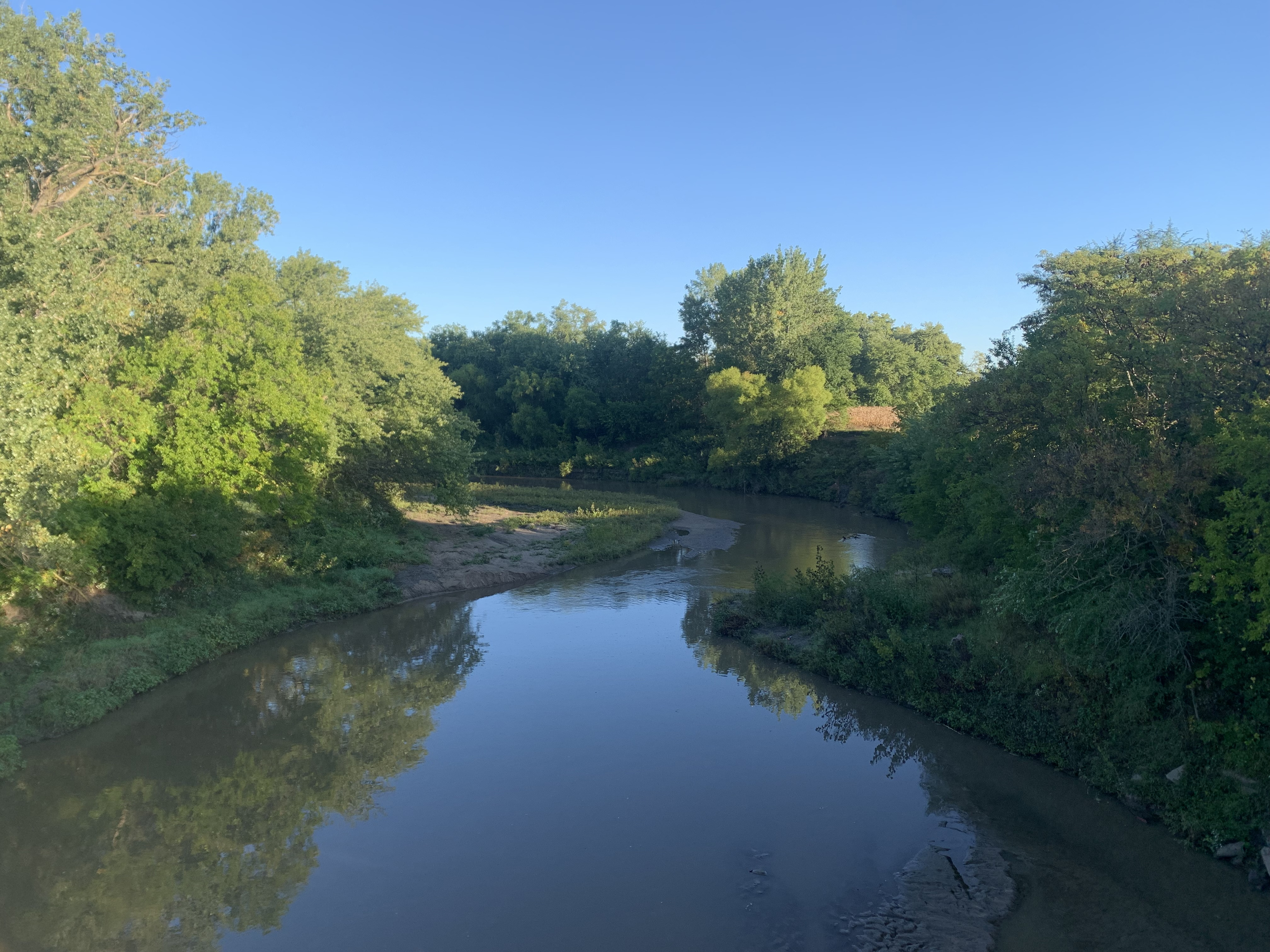
Little Nemaha River at US 136 bridge.

The Nemaha River basin includes the areas of the U.S. state of Nebraska below the Platte River basin that drain directly into the Missouri River. The major streams of the drainage include Weeping Water Creek, Muddy Creek, Little Nemaha River, and Big Nemaha River. The basin has a total area of approximately 2,800 square miles (7,300 km^{2}), and includes much of southeastern Nebraska.

The name 'Nemaha' originates in the Ioway-Otoe-Missouria phrase ñí-máha, which means 'water-soil' and refers to the muddy water at corn-planting time.

== Discharges ==
Stream	Location	Discharge
Weeping Water Creek	Union	111 cu ft/s (3.1 m^{3}/s)
Little Nemaha River	Auburn	332 cu ft/s (9.4 m^{3}/s)
North Fork Big Nemaha River	Humboldt	221 cu ft/s (6.3 m^{3}/s)
Big Nemaha River	Falls City	607 cu ft/s (17.2 m^{3}/s)
