= Nelson Merz =

American politician (1917–1996)

Member of the Nebraska Legislature from the 1st district
- In office January 5, 1977 – January 7, 1981
- Preceded by: Irving Wiltse
- Succeeded by: R. Wiley Remmers

Personal details
- Born: May 27, 1917 Falls City, Nebraska
- Died: January 4, 1996 (aged 78) Falls City, Nebraska
- Party: Democratic
- Spouse: Caroline T. Faller (m. 1939)
- Children: 9 (Dennis, Thelma, Janet, Gale, Carol, Rita, Bruce, Debra, Mary)
- Occupation: Farmer, farm equipment salesman

Nelson Merz (May 27, 1917 – January 4, 1996) was a Democratic politician from Nebraska who served as a member of the Nebraska Legislature from the 1st district from 1977 to 1981.

== Early career ==
Merz was born in Falls City, Nebraska, and worked as a farmer and dealership owner. He purchased the local Ferguson tractor dealership taking over January 1, 1953. Later that year Merz Farm Equipment brought on Massey Harris in addition to Ferguson. In 1956 Massey Harris and Ferguson became Massey Ferguson. He served as a member of the Falls City School Board.

== Nebraska Legislature ==
In 1960, when State Senator John Cooper ran for Governor rather than seek re-election, Merz ran to succeed him in the 1st district, which was based in Gage, Nemaha, Pawnee, and Richardson counties. In the nonpartisan primary, he faced former Humboldt City Councilman Lloyd Stalder, retired state purchasing agent Blaine Yoder, and farmers Jack McGrath and Ted Yoesel. Merz finished fourth in the primary, winning 12 percent of the vote.

Sixteen years later, in 1976, Merz challenged incumbent State Senator Irving Wiltse for re-election in the 1st district. In the primary election, Guy Cooper, the brother of former State Senator Calista Cooper Hughes, whom Wiltse defeated in 1968, placed first, winning 48 percent of the vote, while Merz placed second with 30 percent. Wiltse placed third with 22 percent of the vote, becoming the only incumbent state senator running for re-election that year to fail to be renominated. In the general election, Merz argued that Cooper, who was 69, was too old to serve in the legislature, which he described as a demanding job. Merz narrowly defeated Cooper in the general election, winning 53–47 percent.

Merz ran for re-election in 1980, and was challenged by school superintendent R. Wiley Remmers, retired attorney William Stockdale, Richardson County Commissioner Burnus Schuler, and farmer Keith Sherburne. Merz placed second in the primary election, winning just 25 percent to Remmers's 42 percent, and they advanced to the general election. Remmers defeated Merz by a wide margin, winning 57 percent of the vote to Merz's 43 percent.

== Post-legislative career ==
When Remmers ran for re-election in 1984, Merz and Stockdale both challenged him. Remmers placed first in the primary election, winning 60 percent of the vote to Merz's 25 percent, and they advanced to the general election. Merz lost in a landslide, receiving 31 percent of the vote to Remmers's 69 percent.

In the late 1980s, Merz was supportive of the Posse Comitatus, but noted that he did not support the ideology "as espoused by Jim Wickstrom." In an interview with the Omaha World-Herald, he said, "The founding fathers set up the Posse Comitatus," and blamed "the news media" for misrepresenting the Posse Comitatus's mission.

The Merz family kept the farm equipment dealership running throughout his legislative career. Nelson's three sons; Dennis, Gale and Bruce continued to dealership throughout their careers. In 2010 Nelson's grandson Mitch returned bringing in the 3rd generation of Merz family in Merz Farm Equipment.

Merz also continued farming as well as owning a portion of Salem Grain.

== Death ==
Merz died on January 4, 1996.
