= Stalter =

Stalter is a German language habitational surname and a variant of the surname Stalder. Notable people with the name include:

- Bernard Stalter (1957–2020), French entrepreneur and politician
- Joël Stalter (1992), French professional golfer
- Megan Stalter (1990), American comedian
- Pavao Štalter (1929–2021), Croatian animator, director, screenwriter, scenographer and artist
