= Wiltse =

Wiltse is a surname. Notable people with the surname include:

- Cadwallader Jackson Wiltse (1823–1900), American politician from Wisconsin
- David Wiltse (b. ?), American playwright
- Dottie Wiltse Collins (Dorothy Wiltse Collins, 1923–2008), American baseball player
- Gilbert C. Wiltse (1838–1893), American naval officer
- Hal Wiltse (1903–1983), American baseball player
- Hooks Wiltse (George Leroy Wiltse, 1879–1959), American baseball player
- Irving Wiltse (1900–1997), American politician from Nebraska
- Mark Wiltse (born 1988), American soccer player
- Snake Wiltse (Lewis DeWitt Wiltse, 1871–1928), American baseball player
