= Floyd Pohlman =

American politician (1907–1997)

Member of the Nebraska Legislature from the 2nd district
- In office April 16, 1952 – January 6, 1953
- Preceded by: John McKnight
- Succeeded by: John Aufenkamp

Personal details
- Born: August 2, 1907 Johnson, Nebraska
- Died: August 7, 1997 (aged 90) Auburn, Nebraska
- Party: Republican
- Spouse: Audrey Wolfe (m. 1936; died 1996)
- Children: 3
- Occupation: Automobile dealer

Military service
- Allegiance: United States
- Branch/service: United States Army
- Years of service: 1942–1945

Floyd W. Pohlman (August 2, 1907 – August 7, 1997) was a Republican politician from Nebraska who served as a member of the Nebraska Legislature from the 2nd district from 1952 to 1953.

== Early life ==
Pohlman was born in Johnson, Nebraska, in 1907, and graduated from Johnson High School. He served as the Deputy County Treasurer of Nemaha County, from 1931 to 1935, and on the Auburn School Board from 1938 to 1942. Pohlman served in the U.S. Army during World War II from 1942 to 1945, and in 1945, was appointed by Secretary of State Frank Marsh as Deputy Secretary of State. In 1950, Pohlman was elected to the Auburn City Council, and was elected by the members of the council as president.

== Nebraska Legislature ==
In 1952, State Senator John McKnight, who had declined to seek re-election, resigned from the legislature, citing a need to return to his business interests. Governor Val Peterson appointed Pohlman to serve out the remaining months of Knight's term. He was sworn in on April 16, 1952.

== Post-legislative career ==
On October 6, 1952, Auburn Mayor E. R. Brock resigned, and Pohlman, who remained city council president during his service in the legislature, became acting Mayor. Pohlman was elected as mayor in a 1953 special election, and was re-elected to a full term in 1954. Pohlman was re-elected in 1956, 1958, 1960, and 1962.

In 1964, State Senator Lloyd Stalder declined to seek re-election in the newly created 1st district, which included Johnson, Nemaha, Pawnee, and Richardson counties., Pohlman ran to succeed him, In the nonpartisan primary, Pohlman faced civic activist Calista Cooper Hughes, the sister of former State Senator John Cooper; William Price, the former Mayor of Pawnee City; and farmer Jack McGrath. Pohlman placed first in the primary election, receiving 32 percent of the vote to Hughes's 27 percent. They advanced to the general election, where Hughes narrowly won, defeating Pohlman by 18 votes. Pohlman subsequently petitioned the legislature for a recount, which the legislature rejected on a 36–8 vote.

== Death ==
Pohlman died on August 7, 1997.
