= Senator Morrissey =

Senator Morrissey may refer to:

- John P. Morrissey (politician) (1885–1966), New York State Senate
- John Morrissey (1831–1878), New York State Senate
- Michael W. Morrissey (born 1954), Massachusetts State Senate
- Pierce A. Morrissey (1870–1956), Wisconsin State Senate
- Spencer Morrissey (born 1951), Nebraska State Senate
