= 2022 Andover tornado =

2022 EF3 tornado in Kansas, US

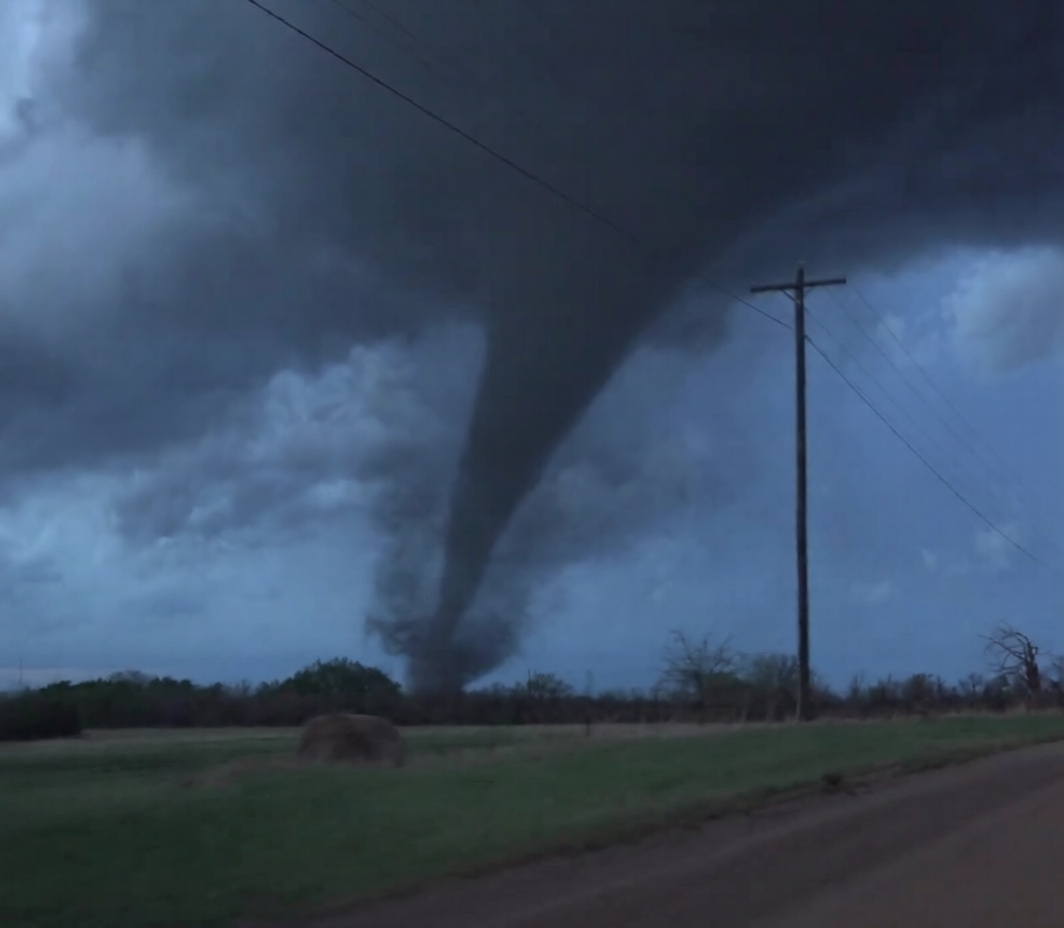
- The tornado at peak intensity in Andover.

Meteorological history
- Formed: April 29, 2022, 8:10 p.m. CDT (UTC–05:00)
- Dissipated: April 29, 2022, 8:31 p.m. CDT (UTC–05:00)
- Duration: 21 minutes

EF3 tornado
- on the Enhanced Fujita scale
- Max width: 250 yards (0.14 mi; 0.23 km)
- Path length: 12.7 miles (20.4 km)
- Highest winds: 155 mph (249 km/h)

Overall effects
- Fatalities: 0
- Injuries: 3
- Damage: $41.5 million
- Areas affected: Butler County, Kansas, particularly Andover
- Part of the Tornadoes of 2022

In the evening hours of April 29, 2022, a strong tornado moved through the city of Andover, located in the U.S. state of Kansas. The tornado tracked 12.8 miles (20.6 km) through the area, injuring three people and inflicting EF3 damage on the Enhanced Fujita scale to structures located on the eastern side of Andover.

The tornado first touched down southwest of Andover in Sedgwick County, causing minor damage. The tornado rapidly intensified as it approached the town, damaging numerous structures prior to entering city limits. The tornado reached EF3 intensity in eastern Andover, where it destroyed several dozen homes and damaged a YMCA fitness center that served the town. It remained on the ground for 21 minutes while tracking 12.8 miles (20.6 km) through the area, and was the only strong tornado to occur during a two-day outbreak that produced 29 tornadoes.

== Meteorological background ==
A powerful low pressure system approached Kansas on April 29, allowing a sharp dryline to track to generally along Interstate 135. The Storm Prediction Center outlined an enhanced risk of severe weather for the region, including a 10% risk area for tornadoes. Storms first developed across central and northeast Kansas near the warm front, but as the early evening hours continued, several storms fired just east of Wichita. One of these storms intensified into a low-precipitation supercellular thunderstorm, which produced the Andover tornado.

== Tornado summary ==
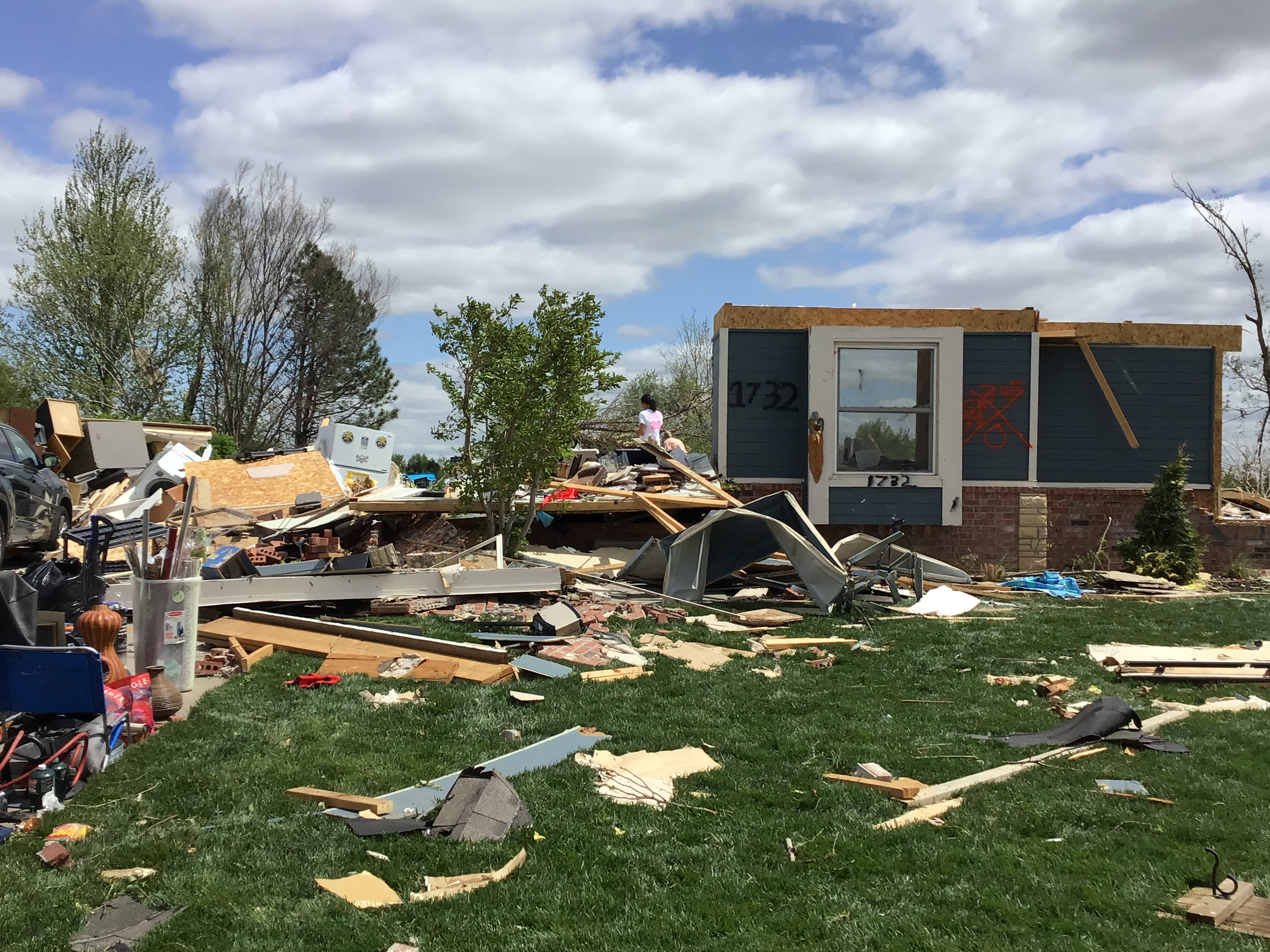
EF3 damage to a home located at the end of Lantern Lane Court, which took a direct hit from the tornado.

The tornado first touched down at 8:10 p.m. CST to the east of McConnell Air Force Base, crossing South 127th Street East and tossing a small grain bin at EF0 intensity, with wind speeds estimated to have been 62 miles per hour (100 km/h). It tracked to the northeast and quickly reached high-end EF2 intensity as it crossed South 137th Street East, East 31st Street South, and several other nearby rural streets. A couple of mobile homes were completely destroyed in this area, a few frame homes had roof and exterior wall loss, and some other residences were damaged to a lesser degree. A pickup truck was flipped over, outbuildings were destroyed, and trees and power poles were snapped along this section of the path as well. After the tornado exited this area, it turned slightly to the north and crossed East Pawnee Street, uprooting trees at EF1 intensity and damaging another home located nearby. The relatively narrow but intense tornado would first reach EF3 intensity moments later as it began to enter the southern fringes of Andover, impacting a cul-de-sac at the end of Lantern Lane Court. A house at this location was destroyed and left with only a few walls standing, while some neighboring homes were severely damaged. A damage survey conducted after the tornado concluded that peak wind speeds in this area reached 155 miles per hour (249 km/h).

The tornado weakened to high-end EF2 strength, but still produced heavy structural damage as it proceeded to cross West Harry Street and South Andover Road in the southern part of town. Multiple houses along this corridor had roofs and exterior walls ripped off, debris was strewn across properties, and trees were snapped or uprooted. Just northeast of this area, the highly visible tornado entered a subdivision and moved across East Minneha Avenue, where many additional homes had roofs torn off and exterior walls knocked down. A majority of the damage in this area was rated high-end EF2, though one house was swept away with only its subfloor remaining, and damage at that residence was rated EF3. It then exited the subdivision and side-swiped Prairie Creek Elementary School, which suffered major roof damage and had windows blown out. Cars were moved and damaged in the school's parking lot, and damage was rated EF2 by National Weather Service damage surveyors at this location. Just north-northeast of the elementary school, a YMCA of the USA fitness center took a direct hit from the tornado and sustained major EF3-level structural damage. Multiple vehicles in the parking lot were thrown and mangled, and one car was picked up by the tornado and lofted 1,000 feet (300 m) in the air before it was dropped through the roof of the fitness center.

The powerful tornado retained EF3 intensity as it continued to the north-northeast and crossed U.S. Route 54, striking a vacant pet supplies business on the other side of the highway. The building was completely destroyed and swept from its slab foundation, though it lacked interior walls. A couple of adjacent homes and buildings suffered severe damage, while nearby trees were twisted, stripped of their branches, and sustained significant debarking. Moving almost due-north, the tornado then weakened back to high-end EF2 strength as it badly damaged a house, destroyed an outbuilding, snapped trees, and moved across a series of open fields as it narrowly missed Andover City Hall. It regained EF3 strength once again as it crossed East 13th Street in the northeastern part of Andover and struck a subdivision, where multiple homes had their roofs and exterior walls removed, or were swept away with only their subfloors remaining. A large wooden electrical transmission line support structure was snapped in this area as well, and winds were estimated to have reached 155 miles per hour (249 km/h).

It continued along a sharp north-northeastern path as it exited Andover and tracked through more sparsely populated areas to the west of Southwest Meadowlark Road, producing high-end EF2 damage as it destroyed a house and an outbuilding. The tornado weakened further and continued through rural farmland to the north-northeast of Andover, producing EF1 to low-end EF2 damage as it destroyed a farm building, snapped trees and power poles, and damaged the roof of a house. It caused a final area of EF0 tree damage along Southwest 30th Street to the southeast of Benton before it dissipated at 8:31 p.m. CST, after being on the ground for 21 minutes along a 12.89 miles (20.74 km) path.

== Aftermath ==
The tornado, seen from Andover City Hall

An estimated 1,074 buildings were damaged by the tornado to varying degrees; up to 400 of those were destroyed. Thousands were also left without power in Sedgwick County directly following the tornado. The United States Air Force deployed 150 airmen to help recovery efforts following the tornado, and many other non-commissioned volunteers visited Andover to provide assistance. Kansas Governor Laura Kelly declared a state of emergency following the tornado. Three people were injured by the tornado; two of these injuries occurred in Sedgwick County.

== Other tornadoes ==
EFU	EF0	EF1	EF2	EF3	EF4	EF5
7	9	11	0	1	0	0

The Andover tornado occurred during an otherwise weak outbreak of 28 tornadoes that lasted from April 29 to April 30. Most of the tornadoes occurred in Kansas and Nebraska, though additional isolated tornadoes touched down in Missouri, Illinois, and Arkansas. In addition to the Andover tornado, the outbreak produced EF1 tornadoes that caused minor damage in the Kansas towns of Parkerville and Rosalia. In Nebraska, a brief EF1 tornado caused considerable damage in Unadilla.

=== April 29 event ===
List of confirmed tornadoes – Friday, April 29, 2022 (Note: All dates are based on the local time zone where the tornado touched down; however, all times are in Coordinated Universal Time for consistency.)
EF#	Location	County / Parish	State	Start Coord.	Time (UTC)	Path length	Max width	Summary
EFU	S of Stamford	Harlan	NE	40.04°N 99.61°W	21:52–21:57	1.26 mi (2.03 km)	20 yd (18 m)	Tornado tracked over open country.
EFU	SW of Orleans	Harlan	NE	40.10°N 99.51°W	22:12	0.01 mi (0.016 km)	20 yd (18 m)	A tornado touched down briefly and was confirmed from photos. No damage reported.
EFU	N of Hildreth	Kearney	NE	40.42°N 99.03°W	22:39–22:41	1.26 mi (2.03 km)	20 yd (18 m)	Tornado tracked over open country, causing no damage.
EF0	NW of Hope	Dickinson	KS	38.75°N 97.19°W	23:31–23:35	1.28 mi (2.06 km)	50 yd (46 m)	A funnel was observed with a brief debris cloud. No damage was found.
EF0	E of Ruskin to W of Deshler	Nuckolls, Thayer	NE	40.12°N 97.84°W	00:05–00:12	4.77 mi (7.68 km)	35 yd (32 m)	Minor damage was done to a cemetery shelter, and numerous irrigation pivots were damaged.
EF1	SE of Carlton to W of Ramona	Dickinson, Marion	KS	38.62°N 97.23°W	00:52–01:10	4.17 mi (6.71 km)	50 yd (46 m)	A cemetery gate was blown over, an outbuilding was damaged, a house had broken windows, and trees were snapped.
EF1	NW of Herington to Parkerville	Dickinson, Morris	KS	38.68°N 97.05°W	01:00–01:28	21.76 mi (35.02 km)	50 yd (46 m)	A weak but long-tracked tornado touched down near Herington and moved through rural areas to the northeast, where a few homes suffered considerable damage to their roofs, porches, and windows. A detached garage was damaged, several barns and outbuildings were damaged or destroyed, and an old metal silo was knocked over and tossed 50 yd (46 m). Trees were snapped in Parkerville before the tornado dissipated.
EF1	NNW of Schuyler	Colfax	NE	41.46°N 97.11°W	01:02–01:04	3.35 mi (5.39 km)	20 yd (18 m)	Around 20 power poles were snapped, and a pivot irrigation system was overturned.
EF1	E of St. George to N of Belvue	Pottawatomie, Wabaunsee	KS	39.19°N 96.38°W	01:03–01:18	11.05 mi (17.78 km)	100 yd (91 m)	A house and an outbuilding sustained roof damage, a farm windmill was destroyed, and a carport was also destroyed. Irrigation pivots were flipped, and trees were snapped as well. The tornado crossed the Pottawatomie/Wabaunsee county line four times.
EF1	SSE of Durham	Marion	KS	38.4493°N 97.2048°W	01:03–01:08	0.91 mi (1.46 km)	50 yd (46 m)	Trees were snapped, tree limbs were broken, and a boat on a trailer was overturned.
EF0	SW of Lehigh	Marion	KS	38.3475°N 97.3368°W	01:03–01:05	0.08 mi (0.13 km)	30 yd (27 m)	A brief tornado caused minor tree damage.
EF1	S of Douglas	Otoe	NE	40.53°N 96.39°W	01:10–01:12	0.84 mi (1.35 km)	100 yd (91 m)	A barn was collapsed, sheds were damaged, shingles were torn off a home, and trees were downed.
EF0	NW of Hillsboro	Marion	KS	38.3640°N 97.2239°W	01:10–01:12	0.16 mi (0.26 km)	30 yd (27 m)	This brief tornado moved through an open field, causing no damage.
EF1	N of Douglas	Otoe	NE	40.6072°N 96.3882°W	01:18–01:19	0.05 mi (0.080 km)	100 yd (91 m)	One shed was destroyed and another was damaged.
EFU	S of Hesston	Harvey	KS	38.073°N 97.443°W	01:19–01:20	0.16 mi (0.26 km)	50 yd (46 m)	Brief touchdown in open country.
EF1	NE of Delia	Jackson	KS	39.32°N 95.88°W	01:37–01:44	3.28 mi (5.28 km)	40 yd (37 m)	A small tornado severely damaged a pole barn, ripped shingles off roofs, and snapped trees.
EFU	S of El Dorado	Butler	KS	37.78°N 96.89°W	01:47–01:48	0.19 mi (0.31 km)	50 yd (46 m)	A brief tornado touched down in open country.
EF1	ESE of El Dorado to NE of Rosalia	Butler	KS	37.79°N 96.72°W	02:05–02:24	8.13 mi (13.08 km)	440 yd (400 m)	Barns and outbuildings were damaged or destroyed as a result of this multiple-vortex tornado, and the roof of a barn was lifted and carried across a highway. Trees and fences were damaged, and minor damage occurred in Rosalia before the tornado dissipated.
EF1	Unadilla	Otoe	NE	40.68°N 96.27°W	02:24–02:25	0.09 mi (0.14 km)	40 yd (37 m)	A brief tornado occurred in Unadilla, where a house had most of its poorly attached roof blown off, and a few other homes had less severe roof and window damage. A rotten tree trunk was snapped, tree limbs were broken, and a small tree branch was impaled into the exterior wall of a house.
EF1	WNW of Eureka	Greenwood	KS	37.84°N 96.41°W	02:44–02:45	0.03 mi (0.048 km)	60 yd (55 m)	A brief tornado rolled a camper and tossed an outbuilding.

=== April 30 event ===
List of confirmed tornadoes – Saturday, April 30, 2022
EF#	Location	County / Parish	State	Start Coord.	Time (UTC)	Path length	Max width	Summary
EF0	SW of Oak Brook	DuPage	IL	41.8370°N 87.9453°W	21:44–21:47	1.9 mi (3.1 km)	60 yd (55 m)	Part of the roof was ripped off an outbuilding, and trees were snapped or uprooted.
EF0	NW of Perryville	Perry	MO	37.7626°N 89.9291°W	22:02–22:03	0.1 mi (0.16 km)	50 yd (46 m)	A machine shed was damaged and another machine shed was destroyed, with flying debris causing some damage to a nearby home, and a piece of lumber being found speared into the ground. Tin roofing from the machine sheds was found deposited in trees. Another house sustained gutter and soffit damage, and tree branches were impaled into the exterior of the structure. A barn sustained roof damage, and trees and tree limbs were downed as well.
EF0	N of Timberlane	Boone	IL	42.3516°N 88.8716°W	22:54–22:55	0.5 mi (0.80 km)	60 yd (55 m)	Several trees were snapped or uprooted, and several floating docks were thrown across Candlewick Lake.
EFU	S of Sharon	Boone	IL	42.4758°N 88.7416°W	23:07–23:08	0.12 mi (0.19 km)	30 yd (27 m)	A brief tornado occurred in an open field, causing no damage.
EF0	NE of Tull	Grant	AR	34.4541°N 92.5564°W	23:14–23:17	0.34 mi (0.55 km)	50 yd (46 m)	A brief tornado remained over private timber company; no damage was observed.
EFU	SW of Colfax	McLean	IL	40.5399°N 88.6605°W	23:46–23:47	0.31 mi (0.50 km)	30 yd (27 m)	A trained spotter reported a tornado. No damage was found.
EF0	SW of Des Arc	Prairie	AR	34.9509°N 91.5458°W	23:52–23:55	0.29 mi (0.47 km)	100 yd (91 m)	The roof and doors were ripped off a farm shop, and propane tanks were moved. Two trees were blown over, and multiple power poles were snapped.

== See also ==
- Weather of 2022
- List of North American tornadoes and tornado outbreaks
- List of notable media in the field of meteorology
- 1991 Andover tornado
