= Andover tornado =

Andover tornado may refer to:

- 1991 Andover tornado
- 2022 Andover tornado
