= William Brandt (Nebraska politician) =

American politician (1924–2000)

Member of the Nebraska Legislature from the 2nd district
- In office January 3, 1961 – January 5, 1965
- Preceded by: John Aufenkamp
- Succeeded by: Rick Budd

Personal details
- Born: December 4, 1924 Unadilla, Nebraska
- Died: December 16, 2000 (aged 76) Lincoln, Nebraska
- Party: Republican
- Spouse: Rose Marie Stoner (m. 1947)
- Children: 4 (Robert W., Karen Sue, Joan Marie, Jane Elizabeth)
- Education: Nebraska State Teachers College at Peru; University of Idaho; University of Nebraska (B.S., LL.B.)
- Occupation: Banker, lawyer, lobbyist

William Brandt (December 4, 1924 – December 16, 2000) was a Republican politician and banker from Nebraska who served as a member of the Nebraska Legislature from the 2nd district from 1961 to 1965.

== Early life ==
Brandt was born in Unadilla, Nebraska, in 1924, and graduated from Unadilla High School in 1942. Brandt served in the military during World War II, and upon returning from active duty, attended the Nebraska State Teachers College at Peru and the University of Idaho, and ultimately graduated from the University of Nebraska, where he received his bachelor's degree in business administration in 1949 and his bachelor of laws in 1952. He worked for the Unadilla First National Bank, under his father, George Brandt, who was the bank's president.

== Nebraska Legislature ==
In 1958, State Senator John Aufenkamp ran for re-election to a fourth term, and Brandt ran against him in the 2nd district. In the primary election, Aufenkamp placed first, winning 58 percent of the vote to Brandt's 42 percent. Aufenkamp defeated Brandt in the general election, winning 56–44 percent.

Aufenkamp declined to run for a fifth term in 1960, and Brandt ran to succeed him. In the primary election, Brandt faced construction worker Dean Cruikshank and Jack Winkle, an attorney and former car dealer. Brandt narrowly placed first in the primary election, winning 43 percent of the vote to Swindle's 40 percent. They advanced to the general election, where Brandt defeated Windle with 56 percent of the vote.

Brandt ran for re-election in 1962, and was re-elected unopposed.

In 1963, Brandt successfully advocated for a bill that adopted the Uniform Commercial Code in the state.

He declined to seek re-election in 1964.

== Post-legislative career ==
Upon leaving the legislature, Brandt was appointed the general counsel to the Nebraska Bankers Association. He became the president of the First National Bank of Unadilla in 1981, and served as the Unadilla village clerk and attorney.

== Death ==
Brandt died on December 16, 2000.
