= Calista Cooper Hughes =

American politician (1914–2004)

Member of the Nebraska Legislature from the 1st district
- In office January 5, 1965 – January 6, 1969
- Preceded by: Lloyd Stalder
- Succeeded by: Irving Wiltse

Personal details
- Born: April 27, 1914 Humboldt, Nebraska
- Died: July 10, 2004 (aged 90) Lincoln, Nebraska
- Party: Republican
- Spouse: Morris Nelson Hughes (m. 1936)
- Children: 3 (Mary, Judy, Morris)
- Relatives: John Cooper (brother)
- Education: University of Nebraska
- Occupation: Teacher

Calista Cooper Hughes (April 27, 1914 – July 10, 2004) was a Republican politician from Nebraska who served as a member of the Nebraska Legislature from the 1st district from 1965 to 1969. She subsequently served as the director of the Nebraska Comprehensive Health Planning Agency.

== Early life and career ==
Calista Cooper was born in Humboldt, Nebraska, in 1914, and was the brother of John Cooper, the Republican nominee for Governor of Nebraska in 1960. She graduated from Humboldt High School in 1931, and from the University of Nebraska in 1935 with her bachelor's degree in economics. After a short trip to Japan following her graduation, she married Morris Hughes, an officer with the United States Foreign Service. They were initially stationed in Ethiopia as the Second Italo-Ethiopian War commenced, and in Albania during the Italian invasion of that country. They were subsequently stationed in various locations in the United States and internationally. Following her husband's retirement, the family returned to Humboldt, and she worked part-time as a teacher and as a civic activist.

== Nebraska Legislature ==
In 1964, Hughes ran for the legislature from the 1st district, which was based in Johnson, Nemaha, Pawnee, and Richardson counties. Incumbent State Senator Lloyd Stalder declined to seek re-election, and Hughes ran against Floyd Pohlman, the Mayor of Auburn and a former state senator; former Pawnee City Mayor William Price; and farmer Jack McGrath. In the primary election, Pohlman placed first, winning 32 percent of the vote to Hughes's 27 percent, and they advanced to the general election. Though the race was formally nonpartisan, both were Republicans.

In the general election, Hughes narrowly defeated Pohlman, winning 7,263 votes to Pohlman's 7,245, and it was the first time that two women (Hughes and State Senator Fern Hubbard Orme) were serving in the legislature at the same time. At the beginning of the legislative session, Pohlman petitioned the legislature for a recount. Hughes, in turn, alleged that Pohlman benefited from illegally cast votes. The legislature ultimately voted to seat Hughes and reject the recount request by a vote of 36 to 8, spearheaded by State Senator Terry Carpenter.

Hughes was named the chair of the committee on public health and welfare in 1967. While serving in the legislature, Hughes was a "progressive voice for education and health care reform" and successfully pushed for legislation to develop the state's rural water districts.

In 1968, Hughes ran for re-election to a second term. She was challenged by businessman Irving Wiltse and McGrath. Hughes placed first in the primary election, winning 42 percent of the vote to Wiltse's 32 percent, and they advanced to the general election, where Hughes lost to Wiltse, 59–41 percent.

== Post-legislative career ==
Following her departure from the legislature, Governor Norbert Tiemann appointed Hughes as the director of the Nebraska Comprehensive Health Planning Agency. She stepped down in 1974.

== Death ==
Hughes died on July 10, 2004.
