= Stalder =

Stalder is a surname of Swiss origin. Notable people with the surname include:

- Florian Stalder (born 1982), Swiss racing cyclist
- Josef Stalder (1919–1991), Swiss gymnast
- Keith J. Stalder, United States Marine Corps general
- Lara Stalder (born 1994), Swiss ice hockey player
- Lloyd Stalder (1988–1978), American politician from Nebraska
- Marvin Stalder (1905–1982), American rower
- Ralph Stalder (born 1986), Swiss ice hockey player
