= John Aufenkamp =

American politician (1893–1962)

Member of the Nebraska Legislature from the 2nd district
- In office January 6, 1953 – January 3, 1961
- Preceded by: Floyd Pohlman
- Succeeded by: William Brandt

Personal details
- Born: November 30, 1893 Greenwood, Nebraska
- Died: February 11, 1962 (aged 68) Julian, Nebraska
- Party: Republican
- Spouse: Hazel Wells (m. 1915)
- Children: 4
- Education: University of Nebraska
- Occupation: Farmer and auctioneer

John Aufenkamp (November 30, 1893 – February 11, 1962) was a Republican politician from Nebraska who served as a member of the Nebraska Legislature from the 2nd district from 1953 to 1961.

== Early life ==
Aufenkamp was born in Greenwood, Nebraska, on November 30, 1893. He attended the College of Agriculture at the University of Nebraska. He settled in Julian, where he was a farmer and auctioneer and served on the school board.

In 1940, Aufenkamp ran for the Nemaha County Commission. He narrowly won the Republican primary, and defeated Democratic nominee W. D. Snyder in the general election by a thin margin. He was re-elected unopposed in 1948 and 1952.

== Nebraska Legislature ==
In 1952, State Senator John McKnight declined to seek re-election, and Aufenkamp ran to succeed him in the 2nd district, which included Nemaha and Otoe counties. In the nonpartisan primary, he faced U.S. Army sergeant William Bischof, Edward Bottcher, and Robert McKissick. Aufenkamp placed first in the primary election by a wide margin, winning 45 percent of the vote to McKissick's 22 percent and Bottcher's 21 percent. Shortly after the primary election, Knight resigned from the legislature, citing a need to focus on his business affairs, and Floyd Pohlman was appointed to serve out the remaining months of his term. Pohlman did not run in the election, and Aufenkamp and McKissick advanced to the general election. Aufenkamp defeated McKissick by a wide margin, receiving 59 percent of the vote to McKissick's 41 percent.

Aufenkamp was re-elected without opposition in 1954 and 1956.

In 1958, Aufenkamp ran for a fourth term, and was challenged by William Brandt, an attorney and banker. Aufenkamp placed first in the primary election, receiving 58 percent of the vote to Brandt's 42 percent, and in the general election, Aufenkamp defeated Brandt with 56 percent of the vote.

Aufenkamp did not run for a fifth term in 1960, citing a need to return to his farm. He was succeeded by Brandt.

== Death ==
Aufenkamp died on February 11, 1962.
