= Lloyd Stalder =

American politician (1888–1978)

Member of the Nebraska Legislature from the 1st district
- In office January 3, 1961 – January 5, 1965
- Preceded by: John Cooper
- Succeeded by: Calista Cooper Hughes

Personal details
- Born: February 23, 1888 Humboldt, Nebraska
- Died: January 25, 1978 (aged 89) Humboldt, Nebraska
- Party: Democratic
- Spouse: Louise Power (m. 1913)
- Education: University of Nebraska
- Occupation: Farmer, grain elevator operator, livestock feeder

Lloyd Stalder (February 23, 1888 – January 25, 1978) was a Democratic politician from Nebraska who served as a member of the Nebraska Legislature from the 1st district from 1961 to 1965.

== Early life ==
Stalder was born in Humboldt, Nebraska, in 1888. He attended Humboldt High School and the University of Nebraska. Stalder served as a Humboldt City Councilman and on the Richardson County Soil Conservation District and County Fair Board.

== Nebraska Legislature ==
In 1960, State Senator John Cooper opted to run for Governor rather than seek re-election, and Stalder ran to succeed him in the 1st district, which included Johnson, Pawnee, and Richardson counties. In the nonpartisan primary, Stalder faced Jack McGrath, a farmer; Nelson Merz, a farm equipment salesman; Blaine Yoder, a retired state purchasing agent; and Ted Yoesel, a farmer. Stalder placed first in the primary, winning 44 percent of the vote, and advanced to the general election with Yoder, who placed second with 22 percent. Stalder defeated Yoder, receiving 59 percent of the vote to his 41 percent.

Stalder ran for re-election in 1962. He was challenged by McGrath, who sought a rematch from the 1960 election, and former Tecumseh Mayor Donald Gorton. Stalder placed first, winning 57 percent of the vote, and McGrath narrowly defeated Gorton for second place by 11 votes. Stalder defeated McGrath to win a second term, 55–45 percent.

Stalder did not seek a third term in 1964.

== Death ==
Stalder died on January 25, 1978.
