= F. W. Sweeney =

American football player, coach, and railroad executive

Biographical details
- Born: September 10, 1873; Humboldt, Nebraska, U.S.
- Died: January 18, 1938 (aged 64); Saint Paul, Minnesota, U.S.

Coaching career (HC unless noted)
- 1895: Doane

Head coaching record
- Overall: 3–2

Fred William Sweeney (September 10, 1873 – January 18, 1938) was an American college football player, coach, and railroad executive.

Sweeney was born in Humboldt, Nebraska, and attended Doane College in Crete, Nebraska. He played at the fullback position on the football team, where he developed a reputation as being "brilliant" and "inclined to be brutal." He was the captain of the 1892 team. He served as Doane's fourth head football coach and held that position for the 1895 season. His coaching record at Doane was 3–2.

Sweeney was married to Ruth Mosman Sweeney. They had two daughters (Mildred and Ruth) and a son (Chesley).

He served as an examiner for the Interstate Commerce Commission from 1907 to 1918. He was later the comptroller of the Northern Pacific Railway and its subsidiaries from 1918 until his death. He also served as a trustee of Doane College from 1927 to 1938.

Sweeney died at a company hospital in January 1938.

== Head coaching record ==
Year	Team	Overall	Conference	Standing	Bowl/playoffs
Doane Tigers (Independent) (1895)
1895	Doane	3–2			
Doane:		3–2			
Total:		3–2			
