= R. Wiley Remmers =

American politician (1916–2003)

Member of the Nebraska Legislature from the 1st district
- In office January 7, 1981 – January 9, 1989
- Preceded by: Nelson Merz
- Succeeded by: Spencer Morrissey

Personal details
- Born: March 1, 1916 Auburn, Nebraska
- Died: August 24, 2003 (aged 87) Auburn, Nebraska
- Spouse: Maxine Aufenkamp (m. 1940)
- Children: 4 daughters
- Education: Peru State College (B.A., M.S.); Emporia State University (Ed.S.)
- Occupation: Farmer, school administrator

R. Wiley Remmers (March 1, 1916 – August 24, 2003) was an American politician from Nebraska who served as a member of the Nebraska Legislature from the 1st district from 1981 to 1989.

== Early life ==
Remmers was born in Auburn, Nebraska, and attended Bratton Union High School. He graduated from Peru State College with his bachelor's and master's degrees, and from Emporia State University with a specialist degree in education. Remmers served as the Superintendent of the Johnson Brock School District.

== Nebraska Legislature ==
In 1980, incumbent State Senator Nelson Merz ran for re-election, and faced a crowded field of opponents, including Remmers, retired attorney William Stockdale, Richardson County Commissioner Burnus Schuler, and farmer Keith Sherburne. During the campaign, the Nebraska Republican Party sent out a letter telling voters that Remmers was the only Republican candidate in the nonpartisan race, even though Stockdale was a Republican, as well. Remmers placed first in the primary election, winning 42 percent of the vote to Merz's 25 percent, and they both advanced to the general election. In the general election, Remmers defeated Merz by a wide margin, receiving 57 percent of the vote to Metz's 43 percent.

Remmers ran for re-election in 1984, and both Merz and Stockdale challenged him. In the primary election, Remmers placed first by a wide margin, receiving 60 percent of the vote to Merz's 25 percent and Stockdale's 15 percent. He advanced to the general election against Merz, and defeated him in a landslide, winning 69-31 percent.

In 1988, Remmers ran for re-election to a third term and was challenged by Spencer Morrissey, a member of the Tecumseh Board of Education and a lobbyist for the Brotherhood of Maintenance of Way Employes, and deli store owner Ricky Andrews. Remmers placed first in the primary, receiving 47 percent of the vote to Morrissey's 31 percent, and advanced to the general election against Morrissey. Morrissey narrowly defeated Remmers, winning by just 37 votes.

== Death ==
Remmers died on August 24, 2003.
