= Bernard Stalter =

French entrepreneur and politician (1957–2020)

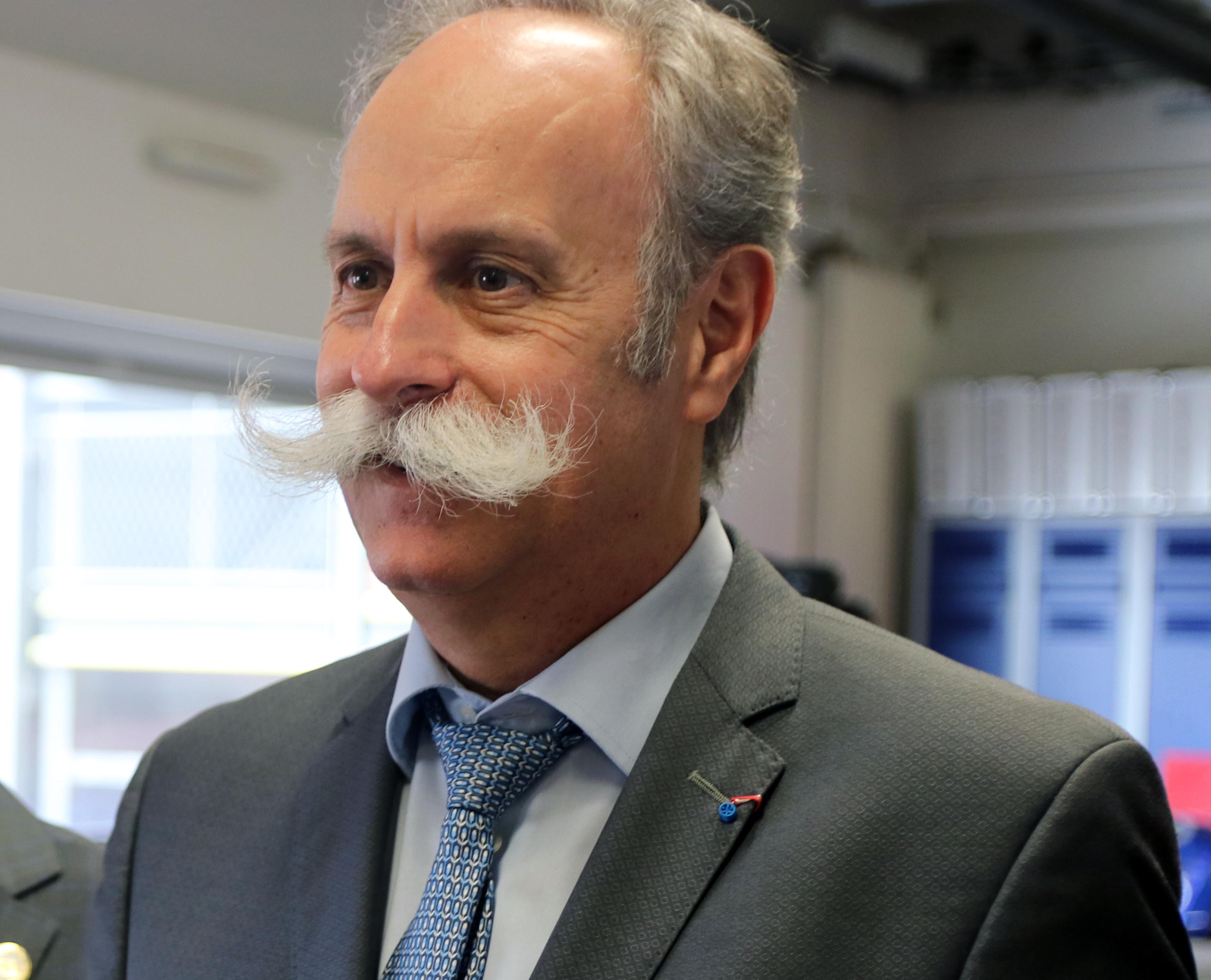
- Stalter in 2018

Regional Councillor of Grand Est for Bas-Rhin
- In office 1 January 2016 – 13 April 2020

Member of the French Economic, Social and Environmental Council
- In office 2015–2018

Personal details
- Born: 12 March 1957 Brumath, France
- Died: 13 April 2020 (aged 63) Strasbourg, France
- Occupation: Politician; Entrepreneur

Bernard Stalter (12 March 1957 – 13 April 2020) was a French entrepreneur and politician.

== Biography ==
Stalter was born on 12 March 1957 in Brumath. At age 14, he began a hairdressing apprenticeship. After he became a certified hairdresser, he worked for the French Army at the Entzheim Air Base. He opened his first salon in Brumath in 1993.

Stalter was elected chair of the Conseil Economique et Social d'Alsace in November 2007, succeeding Jean-Marie Sander. He resigned in 2013. In 2014, he became president of the Union Nationale des Entreprises de Coiffure. He was a part of the Union Nationale des Entreprises de Coiffure from 2015 to 2018. He was President of Beaute Diffusion Events, which earned €1,468,397 in 2015. He was also an agent for Sarl la Coiffure, Coiffure Bernard, and Agiprim.

The only candidate, Stalter was elected to the Alsace and Grand Est Chamber of Trades in November 2016. He was also president of the company Siagi and the Union des corporations artisanales du Bas-Rhin. The following month, he was elected President of CMA France, earning 106 out of the 113 votes.

Stalter arrived in Corsica in May 2017 to visit those affected by the floods of November 2016. Many residents of the island received funds from CMA France's disaster management fund. He also visited those in Guadeloupe affected by Hurricane Maria.

In December 2017, he was elected vice-president of the European Association of Craft, Small and Medium-Sized Enterprises. He was also elected head of the National Confederation of Handicrafts in Service and Manufacturing Trades on 26 September 2018, succeeding Pierre Martin.

On 20 March 2020, Stalter announced on his Facebook page that he had been diagnosed with COVID-19. He died on 13 April in Strasbourg at the age of 63.

== Awards ==
- Knight of the Ordre national du Mérite (2007)
- Knight of the Legion of Honour (2009)
- Officer of the Ordre national du Mérite (2016)
