= John Cooper (Nebraska politician) =

American politician (1911–1991)

Member of the Nebraska Legislature from the 1st district
- In office January 6, 1959 – January 3, 1961
- Preceded by: Otto Kotouc Sr.
- Succeeded by: Lloyd Stalder

Personal details
- Born: January 1, 1911 Humboldt, Nebraska
- Died: September 16, 1991 (aged 80) Humboldt, Nebraska
- Party: Republican
- Spouse: Virginia Lee (m. 1930)
- Children: 2 (Jack, Virginia Lee)
- Relatives: Calista Cooper Hughes (sister)
- Education: University of Nebraska; Kansas State University
- Occupation: Feed manufacturer

John R. Cooper Sr. (January 1, 1911 – September 16, 1991) was a Republican politician from Nebraska who served as a member of the Nebraska Legislature from the 1st district from 1959 to 1961. He was the 1960 Republican nominee for Governor, losing to Frank B. Morrison.

== Early career ==
Cooper was born in Humboldt, Nebraska, in 1911. He attended the University of Nebraska and Kansas State University, and served on the Humboldt City Council for three terms. Cooper served as the Richardson County Draft Board during World War II and drafted himself, and served in the United States Army Quartermaster Corps. He later served as the executive vice-president of the O. A. Cooper Company, one of the state's largest feed manufacturers.

== Nebraska Legislature ==
In 1958, State Senator Otto Kotouc Sr. declined to seek another term in the state legislature, and Cooper ran to succeed him in the 1st district, which included Johnson, Pawnee, and Richardson counties. In the nonpartisan primary, Cooper faced former Dawson School Board member Lloyd Heim. Cooper placed first in the primary by a wide margin, winning 59 percent of the vote to Heim's 41 percent. He won the general election over Heim, winning 59–41 percent.

== 1960 campaign for Governor ==
On December 16, 1959, Cooper announced that he would seek the Republican nomination for Governor in 1960. He faced a crowded field in the Republican primary, including former U.S. Senator Hazel Abel and state senators Terry Carpenter and Dwain Williams. Cooper won the primary election, winning 38 percent of the vote to Abel's 24 percent, Carpenter's 16 percent, and Williams's 15 percent.

In the general election, Cooper faced attorney Frank B. Morrison, the Democratic nominee for Governor. Though Republican presidential nominee Richard Nixon won the state by a wide margin in the presidential election, Morrison narrowly defeated Cooper, winning 52–48 percent. Following the defeat, Cooper returned to the O. A. Cooper Company.

== Death ==
Cooper died on September 16, 1991.
