= Gilbert C. Wiltse =

American naval officer (1838–1893)

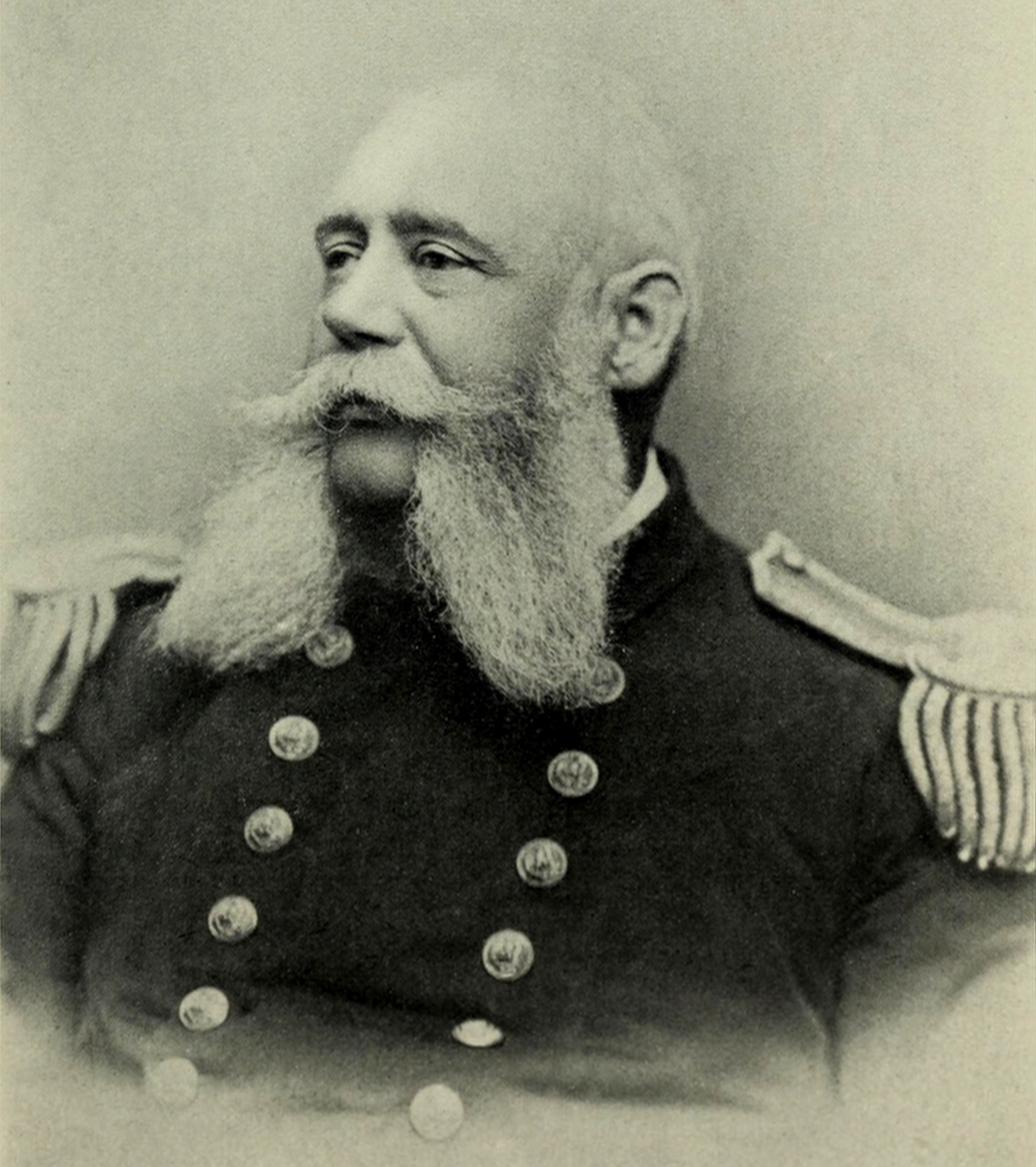
- Portrait of Wiltse in 1898 publication
- Born: Gilbert Cornwall Wiltse; November 26, 1838; Binghamton, New York, U.S.
- Died: April 26, 1893 (aged 54); New York City, New York, U.S.
- Burial place: Oak Hill Cemetery; Washington, D.C., U.S.
- Education: United States Naval Academy
- Spouse: Sarah Steele (m. 1872)
- Children: 4
- Military career
- Commands: USS Sawmut; USS Swatara; USS Franklin; USS Minnesota; USS Boston
- Conflicts: American Civil War; Battle of Hampton Roads; Second Battle of Fort Sumter; Baltimore crisis; Overthrow of the Hawaiian Kingdom

Gilbert Cornwall Wiltse (November 26, 1838 – April 26, 1893) was an American naval officer. He was known for his command of USS Boston during the Overthrow of the Hawaiian Kingdom.

== Early life ==
Gilbert Cornwall Wiltse was born on November 26, 1838, in Binghamton, New York, to Gilbert Wiltse. Wiltse was appointed to the United States Naval Academy from New York and graduated on September 20, 1855.

== Career ==
Wiltse became a midshipman on June 9, 1859, and was ordered on the frigate USS Congress. He cruised on the Brazilian Station from 1859 to 1861. Wiltse was made lieutenant on August 31, 1861. At the outbreak of the Civil War, the USS Congress was recalled and Wiltse joined the USS St. Lawrence. Wiltse was present at the Battle of Hampton Roads on March 8–9, 1862, between the USS Monitor and the CSS Merrimac. He was also in the engagement at Sewell's Point in May 1862. Wiltse served on the steamboat USS Dacotah of the West India Squadron between 1862 and 1863 and was part of the Atlantic Blockading Squadron between 1863 and 1864. He was present at the Second Battle of Fort Sumter and the engagement at Fort Moultrie in 1863. Wiltse was commissioned as a lieutenant commander on March 3, 1865.

Wiltse served on the steamer USS Agawam from 1866 to 1867. He served on the apprentice ship USS Saline from 1867 to 1868. Wiltse served in the New York Navy Yard from 1868 to 1869. He served on the monitor USS Saugus of the North Atlantic Fleet from 1869 to 1870 and the Pensacola Navy Yard from 1870 to 1872.

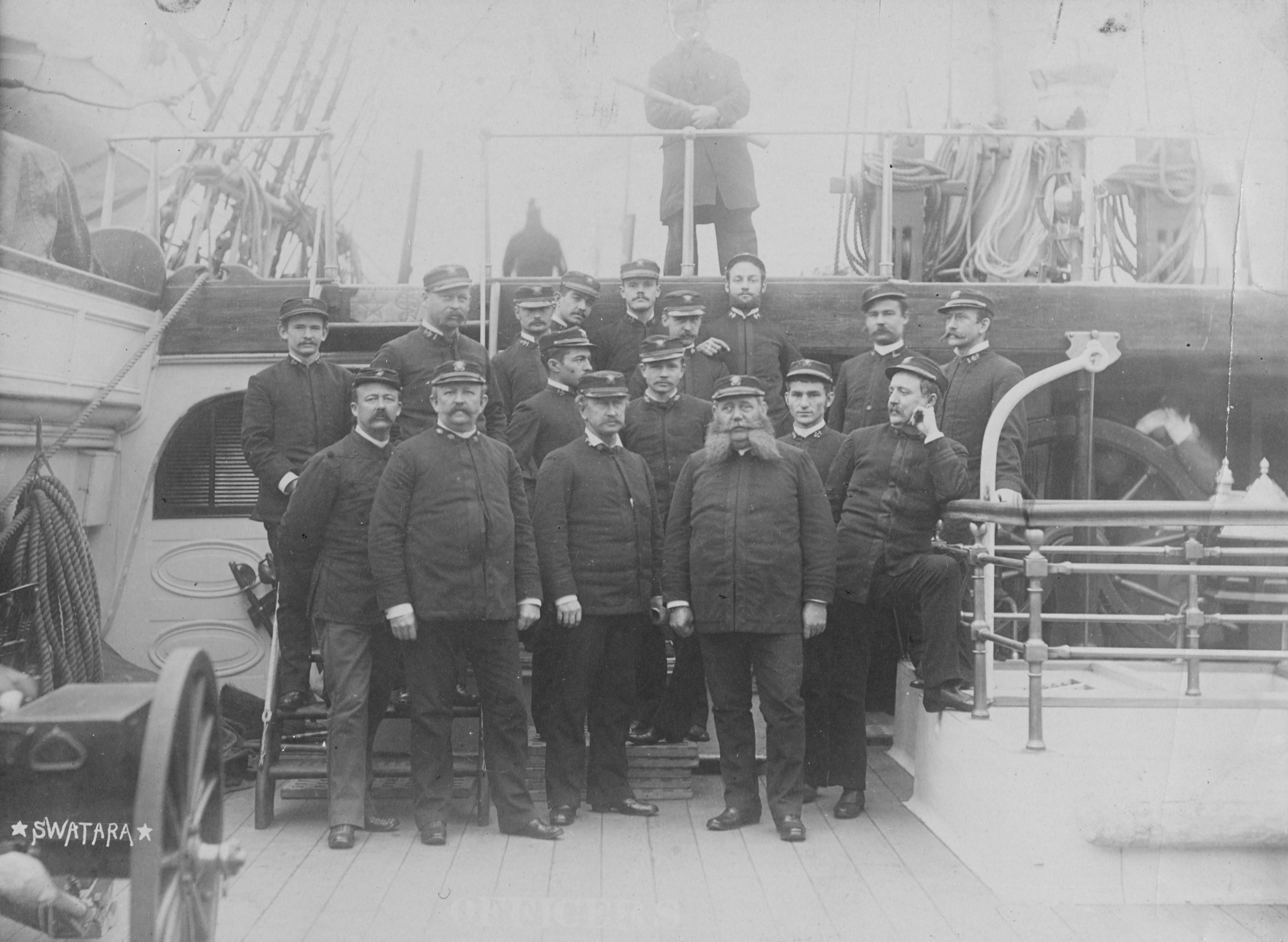
Officers of USS Swartara (1884)

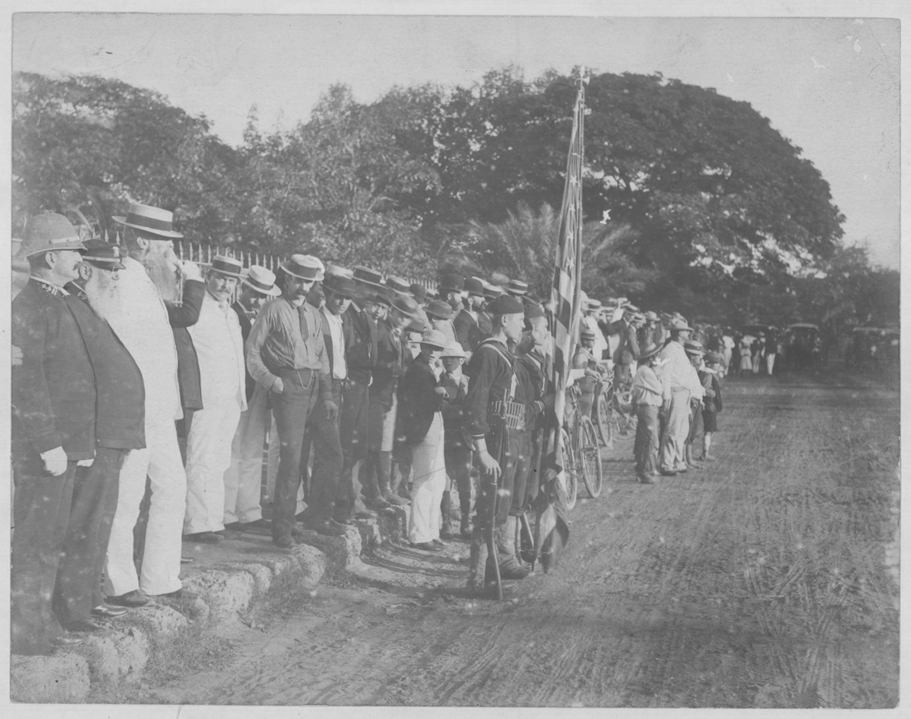
Wiltse (second from left) at parade following Hawaiian overthrow in 1893

On November 8, 1873, Wiltse was made commander of the USS Sawmut of the North Atlantic Squadron. He worked on the shore of the New York Navy Yard from 1878 to 1881. He was assigned command of the USS Swatara from 1884 to 1885. Wiltse was promoted to captain on January 20, 1887, and was placed in command of the receiving ship USS Franklin and later took command of steam ship USS Minnesota. In 1891, Wiltse was placed in command of the USS Boston. He was under command of the Boston during the Baltimore crisis in Chile. He was also under command of the Boston during the 1893 occupation of Honolulu during the Overthrow of the Hawaiian Kingdom. Wiltse had a stroke prior to arriving in Hawaii from Rio de Janeiro. There were reports of mental illness and hallucinations following his stroke. After Honolulu, Wiltse moved back to Washington, D.C., and then back to his family in New York City.

== Personal life ==
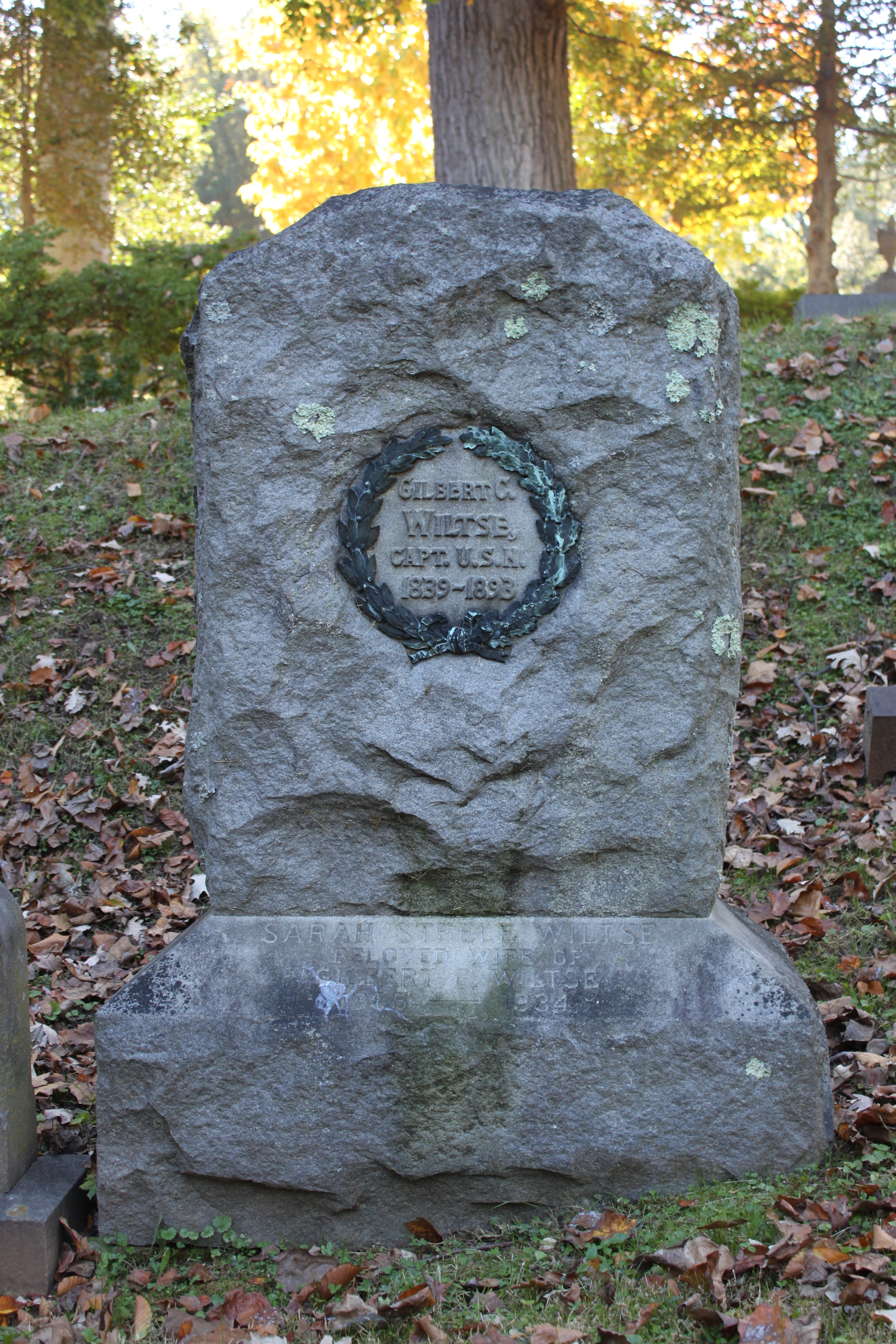
Grave of Wiltse at Oak Hill Cemetery

Wiltse married Sarah "Sallie" Steele of Minneapolis on April 27, 1872. They had two sons and two daughters.

Wiltse died on April 26, 1893, following brain congestion at his home on 42 East 53rd Street in New York City. Wiltse was buried at Oak Hill Cemetery in Washington, D.C.
