= Ralph Stalder =

Swiss ice hockey player

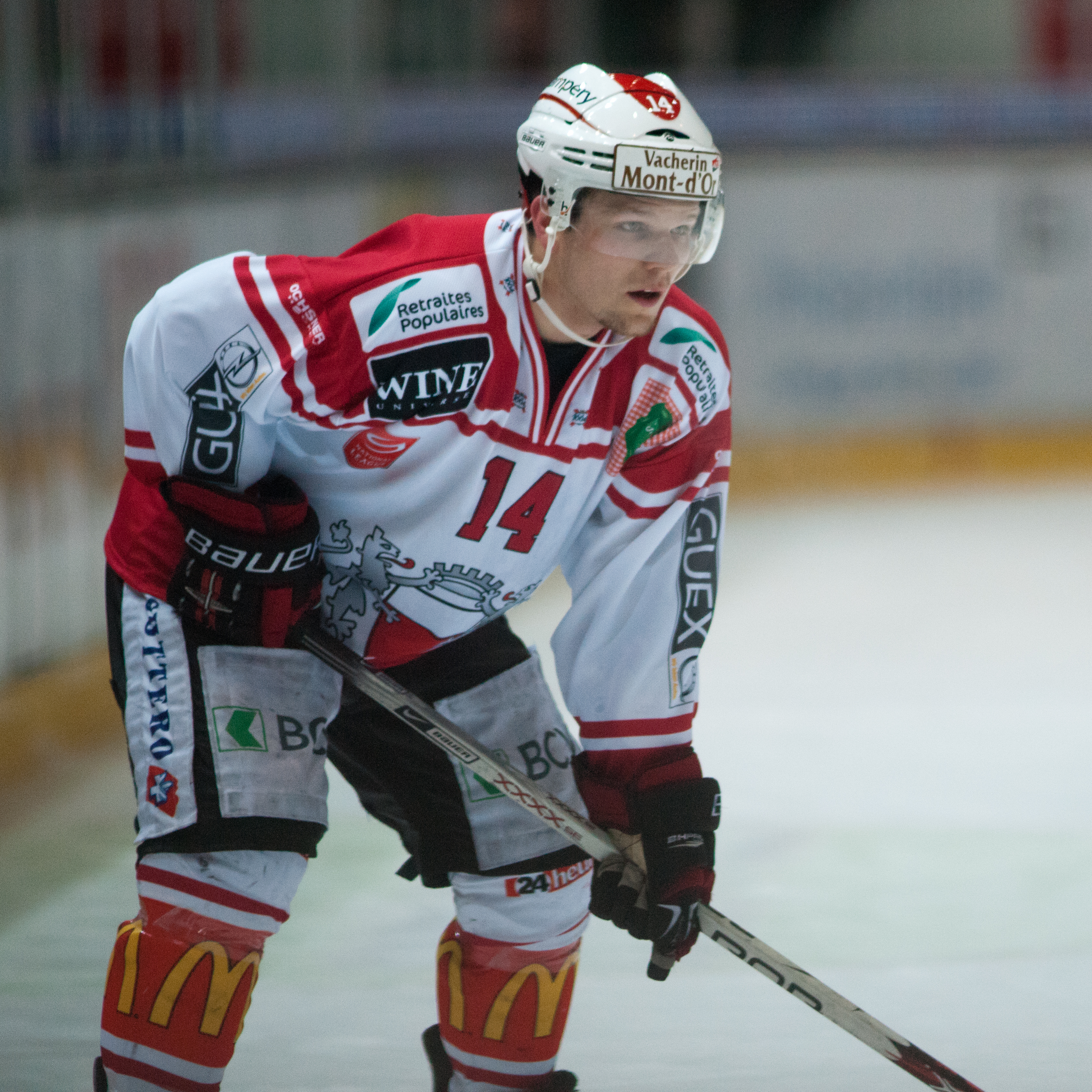
- Born: April 3, 1986 (age 38); Buckten, Switzerland
- Height: 5 ft 10 in (178 cm)
- Weight: 196 lb (89 kg; 14 st 0 lb)
- Position: Defence
- Shot: Left
- Played for: EHC Basel; EHC Biel; Lausanne HC; Genève-Servette HC; HC Fribourg-Gottéron
- Playing career: 2004–2020

Ralph Stalder (born April 3, 1986) is a retired Swiss professional ice hockey defenceman. He last played with HC Fribourg-Gottéron of the Swiss National League (NL).

== Playing career ==
Stalder made his National League A debut playing with EHC Basel during the 2005–06 NLA season.

After seven seasons with Lausanne HC, Stalder left the club as a free agent following the 2015–16 season, he agreed to an initial three-year contract continuing in the NLA with HC Fribourg-Gottéron on 26 October 2015. He stayed until season 2019/20, then he retired.
