= Spencer Morrissey =

American politician

Spencer W. Morrissey

Member of the Nebraska Legislature from the 1st district
- In office January 4, 1989 – January 6, 1993
- Preceded by: R. Wiley Remmers
- Succeeded by: Floyd Vrtiska

Personal details
- Born: February 9, 1951 (age 75) Tecumseh, Nebraska
- Party: Democratic
- Spouse: Debra Spence
- Children: 3 (Cody, Nate, Max)
- Education: University of Nebraska–Lincoln
- Occupation: Track inspector, lobbyist

Spencer W. Morrissey (born February 9, 1951) is a Democratic politician from Nebraska who served as a member of the Nebraska Legislature from the 1st district from 1989 to 1993.

== Early life ==
Morrissey was born in Tecumseh, Nebraska, and graduated from Tecumseh High School. He attended the University of Nebraska–Lincoln for three years, but did not graduate. Morrissey worked as a track inspector for Burlington Northern Railroad and was the state legislative director for the Brotherhood of Maintenance of Way Employes. In 1986, Morrissey was elected to the Tecumseh Board of Education.

== Nebraska Legislature ==
In 1988, Morrissey challenged State Senator R. Wiley Remmers for re-election in the 1st district, which included Johnson, Nemaha, Pawnee, Richardson counties, and parts of Otoe County, in southeastern Nebraska. In the nonpartisan primary, Remmers placed first, winning 47 percent of the vote. Morrissey placed second with 31 percent of the vote, advancing to the general election, while deli store owner Ricky Andrews placed third with 22 percent of the vote. In the general election, Morrissey narrowly defeated Remmers. The initial results showed Morrissey ahead of Remmers by just 42 votes, and a recount confirmed Morrissey's victory, but reduced the margin to 37 votes.

While a member of the Legislature, Morrissey sponsored legislation that established a state-level clean air act, created an environmental trust fund, and adopted solid waste management regulations.

In 1992, Morrissey ran for re-election. Following the 1990 Census, the state redrew its legislative districts, and the 1st district expanded to include part of Gage County. Morrissey was challenged by Floyd Vrtiska, a member of the Pawnee County Board of Commissioners. In the primary election, Vrtiska narrowly placed first over Morrissey, winning 51 percent of the vote to Morrissey's 49 percent. Morrissey campaigned on his effectiveness in the legislature, and argued that the election was about "who's running the district," pointing to corporate campaign contributions to Vrtiska. Vrtiska ultimately defeated Morrissey, receiving 56 percent of the vote.

== Post-legislative career ==
After leaving the Legislature in 1993, Morrissey registered as a lobbyist. Later that year, he was appointed by Governor Ben Nelson to the Nebraska Environmental Quality Council.
