= John McKnight (Nebraska politician) =

American politician (1906–1979)

Member of the Nebraska Legislature from the 2nd district
- In office January 7, 1947 – March 31, 1952
- Preceded by: Frank Sorrell
- Succeeded by: Floyd Pohlman

Personal details
- Born: April 27, 1906 Auburn, Nebraska
- Died: September 1, 1979 (aged 73) El Paso, Texas
- Party: Republican
- Spouse: Adele Barnhart (m. 1935; div. 1964)
- Children: 3 (Mary, Rita, Anne)
- Education: University of Nebraska (A.B., LL.B.)
- Occupation: Attorney

John Perrill McKnight (April 27, 1906 – September 1, 1979) was a Republican politician from Nebraska who served as a member of the Nebraska Legislature from the 2nd district from 1947 to 1952.

== Early life ==
McKnight was born in Auburn, Nebraska, in 1906. He graduated from the University of Nebraska with his bachelor's degree in 1929, and from the University of Nebraska College of Law with his bachelor of laws degree in 1931. Following his graduation in 1931, McKnight returned to Auburn, where he joined Ernest Armstrong in practice, forming the law firm of Armstrong & McKnight. In 1932, after the resignation of Nemaha County Attorney Lee Kelligar, the county board of commissioners appointed McKnight as Kelligar's successor. McKnight ran for a full term as County Attorney, and was named by the Republican County as its replacement nominee after Kelligar dropped out, and he was elected unopposed. He was re-elected in 1934 and 1938.

In 1941, McKnight was called for service during World War II.He attended the Army Command and General Staff College and joined the U.S. Department of War's general staff, working under General George C. Marshall. McKnight rose to the rank of lieutenant colonel, and participated in the invasion of Italy in Salerno and the Battle of Normandy at Omaha Beach.

== Nebraska Legislature ==
State Senator Frank Sorrell opted to run for Governor in 1946 rather than seek re-election, and McKnight ran to succeed him in the 2nd district, which included Nemaha and Otoe counties. In the nonpartisan primary, McKnight faced Otoe County Surveyor Lester Ehlers, insurance agent Arthur Liljegren, and farmers Adolph Wolf and E. H. Boettcher. McKnight placed first in the primary, winning 44 percent of the vote to Ehlers's 24 percent, and they advanced to the general election. McKnight defeated Ehlers in the general election, winning 55 percent of the vote.

McKnight ran for re-election in 1948, and was re-elected unopposed.

In 1950, McKnight ran for a third term, and was challenged by Boettcher. He received 67 percent of the vote in the primary election to Boettcher's 33 percent, and they advanced to the general election. McKnight won re-election in a landslide, receiving 65 percent of the vote to Boettcher's 35 percent.

McKnight resigned from the legislature on March 31, 1952, stating, "I find that my business affairs, in connection with my legal practice do not permit me to continue on in my present capacity as a member of the legislature."

== Post-legislative career ==
In 1954, McKnight considered running in the Republican primary to succeed Congressman Carl Curtis in the 1st district, but ultimately declined to run.

== Death ==
McKnight died on September 1, 1979.
