= Irving Wiltse =

American politician (1900–1997)

Member of the Nebraska Legislature from the 1st district
- In office January 6, 1969 – January 5, 1977
- Preceded by: Calista Cooper Hughes
- Succeeded by: Nelson Merz

Personal details
- Born: March 15, 1900 Preston, Nebraska
- Died: April 29, 1997 (aged 97) Weslaco, Texas
- Party: Republican
- Spouse: Gladys Buxton (m. 1927; died 1995)
- Children: 2 (Marjorie, Irving)
- Education: Nebraska Wesleyan University
- Occupation: Farm machinery dealer

Irving Wiltse (March 15, 1900 – April 29, 1997) was a Republican politician from Nebraska who served as a member of the Nebraska Legislature from the 1st district from 1969 to 1977.

== Early career ==
Wiltse was born in Preston, Nebraska, in 1900, and graduated from Falls City High School. He later attended Nebraska Wesleyan University, graduating in 1924. He served in the U.S. Army during World War I and in the U.S. Navy in World War II, and continuing serving in the U.S. Naval Reserve until 1962. Wiltse worked for the Boy Scouts of America in the Philippines and in Puerto Rico from 1926 to 1941. He worked in Falls City as a farm machinery dealer.

== Nebraska Legislature ==
In 1968, Wiltse ran for the state legislature against State Senator Calista Cooper Hughes in the 1st district, which included Johnson, Nemaha, and Richardson counties. In the primary election, Hughes placed first with 42 percent of the vote, and Wiltse placed second with 32 percent and farmer Jack McGrath placed third with 26 percent. In the general election, Wiltse defeated Hughes by a wide margin, winning 59–41 percent.

Wiltse ran for re-election in 1972, and was challenged by McGrath. In the primary election, Wiltse narrowly placed first over McGrath, winning just 50.3 percent of the vote to McGrath's 49.7 percent. Wiltse ultimately defeated McGrath in the general election, winning his second term, 55–45 percent.

In 1976, Wiltse ran for a third term, and was challenged by Nelson Merz, a member of the Falls City School Board, and Guy Cooper, the brother of Senator Hughes, whom Wiltse defeated in 1968. In the primary election, Cooper placed first, winning 48 percent of the vote, Merz placed second with 30 percent, and Wiltse placed third with 22 percent, and was the only incumbent senator seeking re-election to lose at the primary election that year.

== Death ==
After leaving the legislature, Wiltse and his wife retired to Weslaco, Texas, where he died on April 29, 1997.
