= Douglas, Nebraska =

- Village
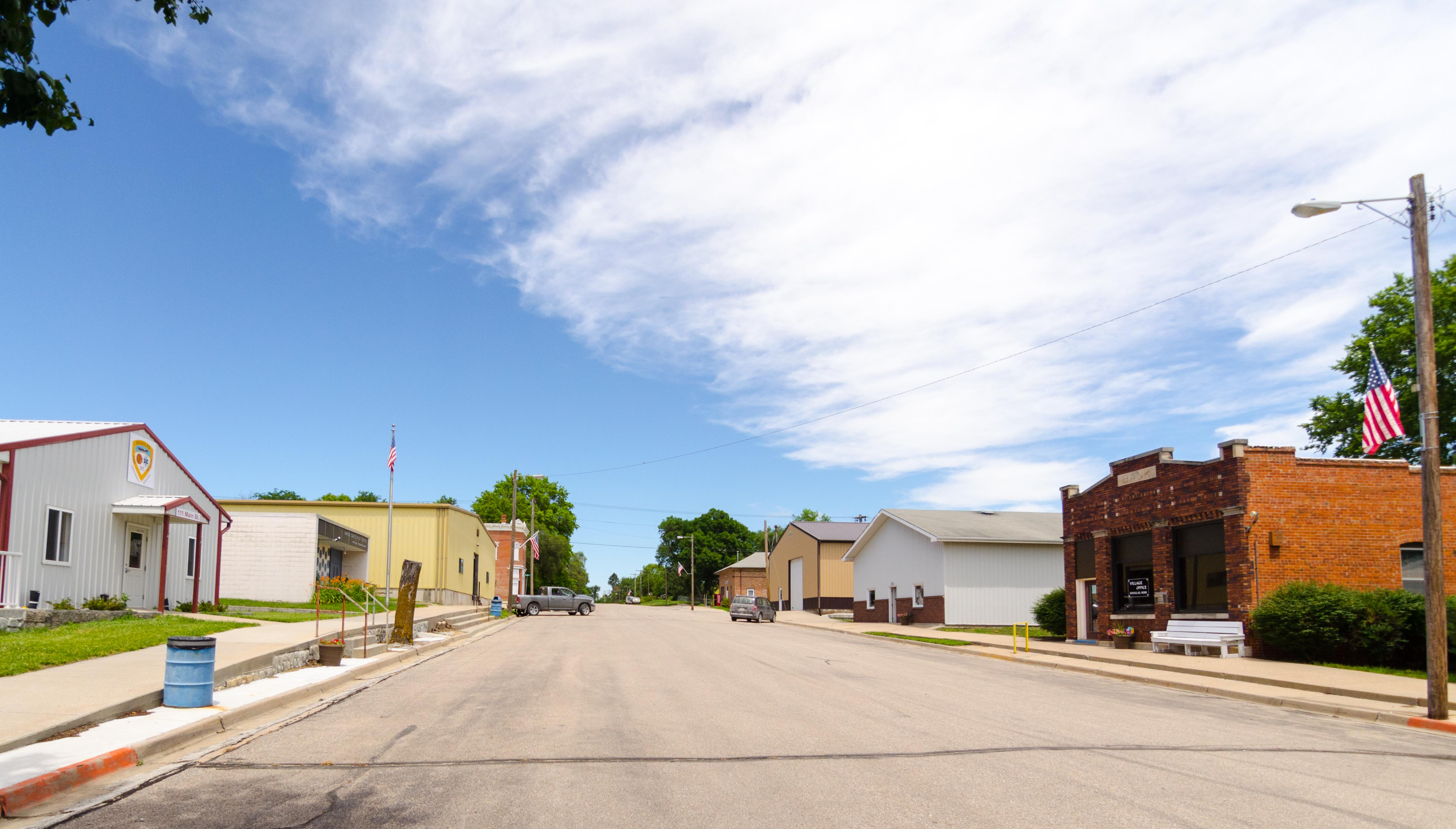
- Main Street in Downtown Douglas

- Location of Douglas, Nebraska
- Coordinates: 40°35′35″N 96°23′18″W
- Country: United States
- State: Nebraska
- County: Otoe

Area
  - Total: 0.22 sq mi (0.57 km^{2})
  - Land: 0.22 sq mi (0.57 km^{2})
  - Water: 0 sq mi (0.00 km^{2})
- Elevation: 1,250 ft (380 m)

Population (2020)
  - Total: 166
  - Density: 756.1/sq mi (291.92/km^{2})
- Time zone: UTC-6 (Central (CST))
  - Summer (DST): UTC-5 (CDT)
- ZIP code: 68344
- Area code: 402
- FIPS code: 31-13505
- GNIS feature ID: 2398742
- Website: https://www.villageofdouglas.com/

Douglas is a village in southwest Otoe County, Nebraska, United States. The population was 166 at the 2020 census.

== History ==
Douglas was platted c. 1888. Douglas was the maiden name of the wife of the original owner of the town site.

== Geography ==
According to the United States Census Bureau, the village has a total area of 0.22 square miles (0.57 km^{2}), all land.

== Demographics ==
Historical population
Census	Pop.	Note	%±
1900	253		—
1910	305		20.6%
1920	242		−20.7%
1930	233		−3.7%
1940	234		0.4%
1950	213		−9.0%
1960	197		−7.5%
1970	175		−11.2%
1980	207		18.3%
1990	199		−3.9%
2000	231		16.1%
2010	173		−25.1%
2020	166		−4.0%
U.S. Decennial Census

=== 2010 census ===
As of the census of 2010, there were 173 people, 79 households, and 46 families living in the village. The population density was 786.4 inhabitants per square mile (303.6/km^{2}). There were 102 housing units at an average density of 463.6 per square mile (179.0/km^{2}). The racial makeup of the village was 98.3% White, 1.2% African American, and 0.6% from two or more races. Hispanic or Latino of any race were 0.6% of the population.

There were 79 households, of which 26.6% had children under the age of 18 living with them, 46.8% were married couples living together, 5.1% had a female householder with no husband present, 6.3% had a male householder with no wife present, and 41.8% were non-families. 32.9% of all households were made up of individuals, and 10.1% had someone living alone who was 65 years of age or older. The average household size was 2.19 and the average family size was 2.83.

The median age in the village was 44.5 years. 21.4% of residents were under the age of 18; 6.3% were between the ages of 18 and 24; 22.6% were from 25 to 44; 39.9% were from 45 to 64; and 9.8% were 65 years of age or older. The gender makeup of the village was 49.1% male and 50.9% female.

=== 2000 census ===
As of the census of 2000, there were 231 people, 91 households, and 58 families living in the village. The population density was 1,038.7 inhabitants per square mile (401.0/km^{2}). There were 96 housing units at an average density of 431.7 per square mile (166.7/km^{2}). The racial makeup of the village was 97.84% White, 1.30% African American, and 0.87% from two or more races.

There were 91 households, out of which 29.7% had children under the age of 18 living with them, 56.0% were married couples living together, 4.4% had a female householder with no husband present, and 35.2% were non-families. 28.6% of all households were made up of individuals, and 12.1% had someone living alone who was 65 years of age or older. The average household size was 2.54 and the average family size was 3.24.

In the village, the population was spread out, with 26.8% under the age of 18, 7.8% from 18 to 24, 32.0% from 25 to 44, 23.4% from 45 to 64, and 10.0% who were 65 years of age or older. The median age was 38 years. For every 100 females, there were 97.4 males. For every 100 females age 18 and over, there were 108.6 males.

As of 2000 the median income for a household in the village was $33,594, and the median income for a family was $38,889. Males had a median income of $28,125 versus $20,938 for females. The per capita income for the village was $15,174. About 6.9% of families and 14.1% of the population were below the poverty line, including 30.2% of those under the age of eighteen and 18.2% of those 65 or over.
