= Unadilla, Nebraska =

- Village
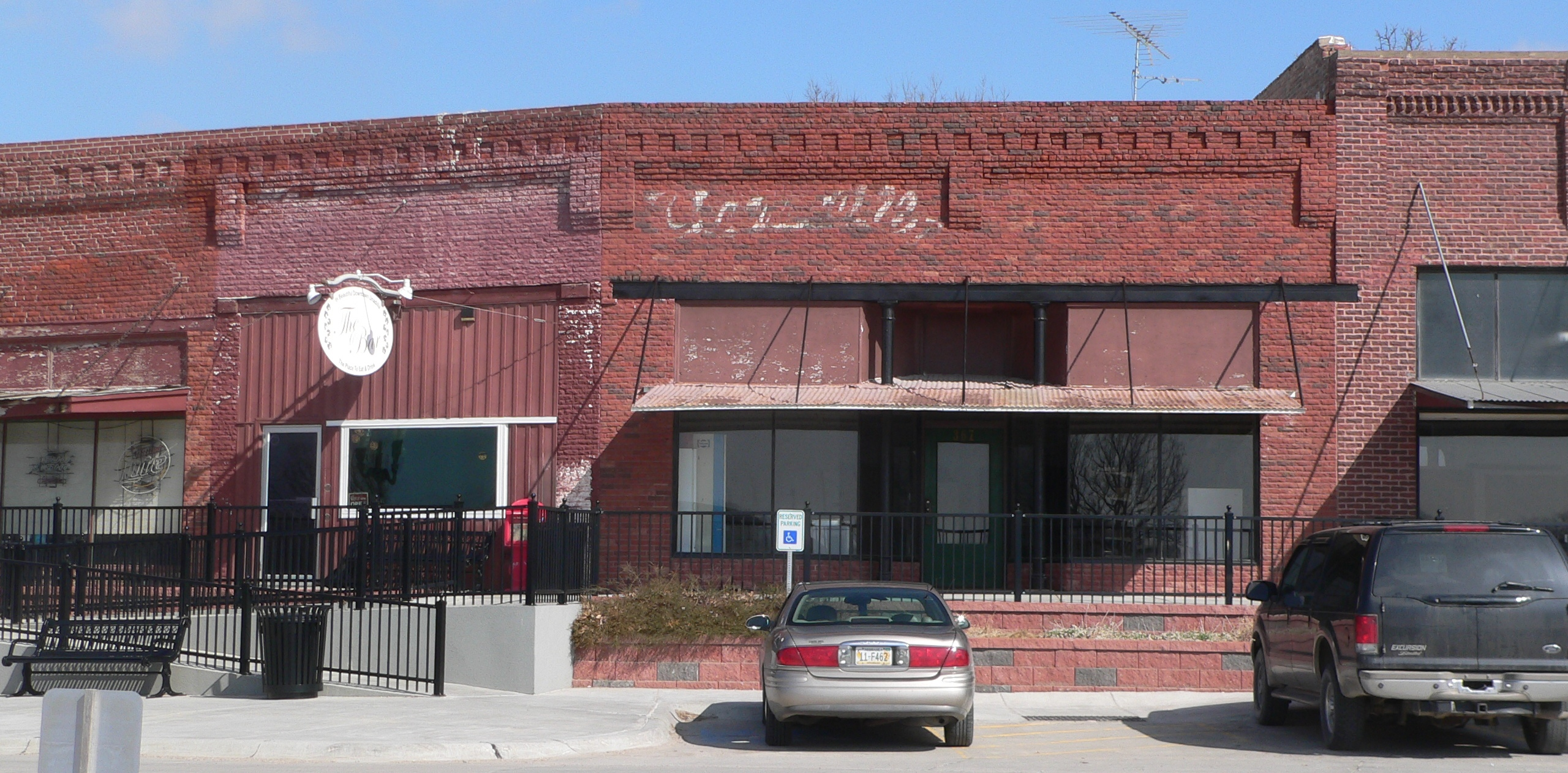
- The Unadilla Main Street Historic District is listed in the National Register of Historic Places.

- Location of Unadilla, Nebraska
- Coordinates: 40°40′59″N 96°16′12″W
- Country: United States
- State: Nebraska
- County: Otoe

Area
  - Total: 0.32 sq mi (0.84 km^{2})
  - Land: 0.32 sq mi (0.84 km^{2})
  - Water: 0 sq mi (0.00 km^{2})
- Elevation: 1,106 ft (337 m)

Population (2020)
  - Total: 296
  - Density: 907.6/sq mi (350.41/km^{2})
- Time zone: UTC-6 (Central (CST))
  - Summer (DST): UTC-5 (CDT)
- ZIP code: 68454
- Area code: 402
- FIPS code: 31-49530
- GNIS feature ID: 2400019
- Website: www.unadillanebraska.com

Unadilla is a village in Otoe County, Nebraska, United States. The population was 296 at the 2020 census.

== History ==
Unadilla was platted in 1871 when the Midland Pacific Railroad was extended to that point. It was named after Unadilla, New York, the former hometown of an early settler.

== Geography ==
According to the United States Census Bureau, the village has a total area of 0.31 square miles (0.80 km^{2}), all land.

== Demographics ==
Historical population
Census	Pop.	Note	%±
1880	178		—
1890	195		9.6%
1900	243		24.6%
1910	209		−14.0%
1920	227		8.6%
1930	194		−14.5%
1940	223		14.9%
1950	216		−3.1%
1960	254		17.6%
1970	271		6.7%
1980	291		7.4%
1990	294		1.0%
2000	342		16.3%
2010	311		−9.1%
2020	296		−4.8%
U.S. Decennial Census

=== 2010 census ===
As of the census of 2010, there were 311 people, 132 households, and 95 families residing in the village. The population density was 1,003.2 inhabitants per square mile (387.3/km^{2}). There were 147 housing units at an average density of 474.2 per square mile (183.1/km^{2}). The racial makeup of the village was 96.1% White, 0.6% African American, 1.0% Native American, 0.6% from other races, and 1.6% from two or more races. Hispanic or Latino of any race were 0.6% of the population.

There were 132 households, of which 28.8% had children under the age of 18 living with them, 61.4% were married couples living together, 6.8% had a female householder with no husband present, 3.8% had a male householder with no wife present, and 28.0% were non-families. 25.0% of all households were made up of individuals, and 16.7% had someone living alone who was 65 years of age or older. The average household size was 2.36 and the average family size was 2.75.

The median age in the village was 44.1 years. 19.3% of residents were under the age of 18; 7% were between the ages of 18 and 24; 25.7% were from 25 to 44; 28% were from 45 to 64; and 19.9% were 65 years of age or older. The gender makeup of the village was 50.2% male and 49.8% female.

=== 2000 census ===
As of the census of 2000, there were 342 people, 139 households, and 97 families residing in the village. The population density was 1,183.5 inhabitants per square mile (457.0/km^{2}). There were 144 housing units at an average density of 498.3 per square mile (192.4/km^{2}). The racial makeup of the village was 98.54% White, 0.29% Native American, 1.17% from other races. Hispanic or Latino of any race were 2.34% of the population.

There were 139 households, out of which 32.4% had children under the age of 18 living with them, 64.7% were married couples living together, 1.4% had a female householder with no husband present, and 30.2% were non-families. 27.3% of all households were made up of individuals, and 17.3% had someone living alone who was 65 years of age or older. The average household size was 2.46 and the average family size was 2.98.

In the village, the population was spread out, with 24.3% under the age of 18, 6.1% from 18 to 24, 27.2% from 25 to 44, 24.0% from 45 to 64, and 18.4% who were 65 years of age or older. The median age was 41 years. For every 100 females, there were 104.8 males. For every 100 females age 18 and over, there were 103.9 males.

As of 2000 the median income for a household in the village was $40,625, and the median income for a family was $51,875. Males had a median income of $35,446 versus $27,188 for females. The per capita income for the village was $18,049. About 8.1% of families and 16.6% of the population were below the poverty line, including 23.9% of those under age 18 and 15.0% of those age 65 or over.
