= 1960 Nebraska gubernatorial election =

- November 8, 1960
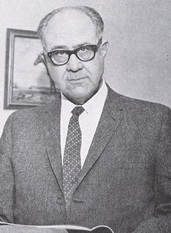

Nominee	Frank B. Morrison	John Cooper
Party	Democratic	Republican
Popular vote	311,344	287,302
Percentage	51.98%	47.97%
- County results Morrison: 50–60% 60–70% 70–80% Cooper: 50–60% 60–70% 70–80%
Governor before election
Dwight Burney
Republican
Elected Governor
Frank B. Morrison
Democratic

The 1960 Nebraska gubernatorial election was held on November 8, 1960, and featured attorney and frequent political candidate Frank B. Morrison, a Democrat, defeating Republican nominee, state Senator John Cooper. Incumbent Governor Ralph Brooks did not seek re-election, and instead ran for the U.S. Senate. However, on September 9, 1960, Brooks died, elevating Lieutenant Governor Dwight Burney to the governorship for the final months of Brooks's term.

== Democratic primary ==
=== Candidates ===
- Charles A. Bates
- Robert B. Conrad, administrative assistant to Governor Ralph Brooks
- Tony Mangiamelli
- Frank B. Morrison, attorney and former school superintendent

=== Results ===
Democratic primary results
Party	Candidate	Votes	%
Democratic	Frank B. Morrison	51,335	47.98
Democratic	Robert B. Conrad	44,486	41.58
Democratic	Charles A. Bates	5,487	5.13
Democratic	Tony Mangiamelli	5,254	4.91
Democratic	Write-in	426	0.40

== Republican primary ==
=== Candidates ===
- Hazel Abel, former U.S. Senator and businesswoman
- Terry Carpenter, member of the Nebraska Legislature and former U.S. Representative
- John Cooper, member of the Nebraska Legislature
- Del Lienemann, accountant
- George H. Ramsey
- Dwain Williams, member of the Nebraska Legislature

=== Results ===
Republican primary results
Party	Candidate	Votes	%
Republican	John Cooper	61,286	37.74
Republican	Hazel Abel	39,109	24.08
Republican	Terry Carpenter	25,659	15.80
Republican	Dwain Williams	23,545	14.50
Republican	Del Lienemann	9,390	5.78
Republican	George H. Ramsey	3,239	2.00
Republican	Write-in	168	0.10

== General election ==
=== Results ===
Nebraska gubernatorial election, 1960
Party	Candidate	Votes	%
Democratic	Frank B. Morrison	311,344	51.98%
Republican	John Cooper	287,302	47.97%
Write-in	Others	325	0.05%
Total votes		598,971	100.0%
Democratic hold			

==== By County ====
By county

County	Person Democratic		Person Republican		Various candidates Other parties		Margin		Total votes
County	#	%	#	%	#	%	#	%	Total votes
Adams County									
Antelope County									
Arthur County									
Banner County									
Blaine County									
Boone County									
Box Butte County									
Boyd County									
Brown County									
Buffalo County									
Burt County									
Butler County									
Cass County									
Cedar County									
Chase County									
Cherry County									
Cheyenne County									
Clay County									
Colfax County									
Cuming County									
Custer County									
Dakota County									
Dawes County									
Dawson County									
Deuel County									
Dixon County									
Dodge County									
Douglas County									
Dundy County									
Fillmore County									
Franklin County									
Frontier County									
Furnas County									
Gage County									
Garden County									
Garfield County									
Gosper County									
Grant County									
Greeley County									
Hall County									
Hamilton County									
Hayes County									
Hitchcock County									
Holt County									
Hooker County									
Howard County									
Jefferson County									
Johnson County									
Kearney County									
Keith County									
Keya Paha County									
Kimball County									
Knox County									
Lancaster County									
Lincoln County									
Logan County									
Loup County									
Madison County									
McPherson County									
Merrick County									
Morrill County									
Nance County									
Nance County									
Nemaha County									
Nuckolls County									
Otoe County									
Pawnee County									
Perkins County									
Phelps County									
Pierce County									
Platte County									
Polk County									
Red Willow County									
Richardson County									
Rock County									
Saline County									
Sarpy County									
Saunders County									
Scotts Bluff County									
Seward County									
Sheridan County									
Sioux County									
Stanton County									
Thayer County									
Stanton County									
Thurston County									
Valley County									
Washington County									
Wayne County									
Webster County									
Wheeler County									
York County									
Totals									

== See also ==
- 1960 Nebraska lieutenant gubernatorial election
