= Humboldt, Nebraska =

City in Richardson County, Nebraska, United States

- City
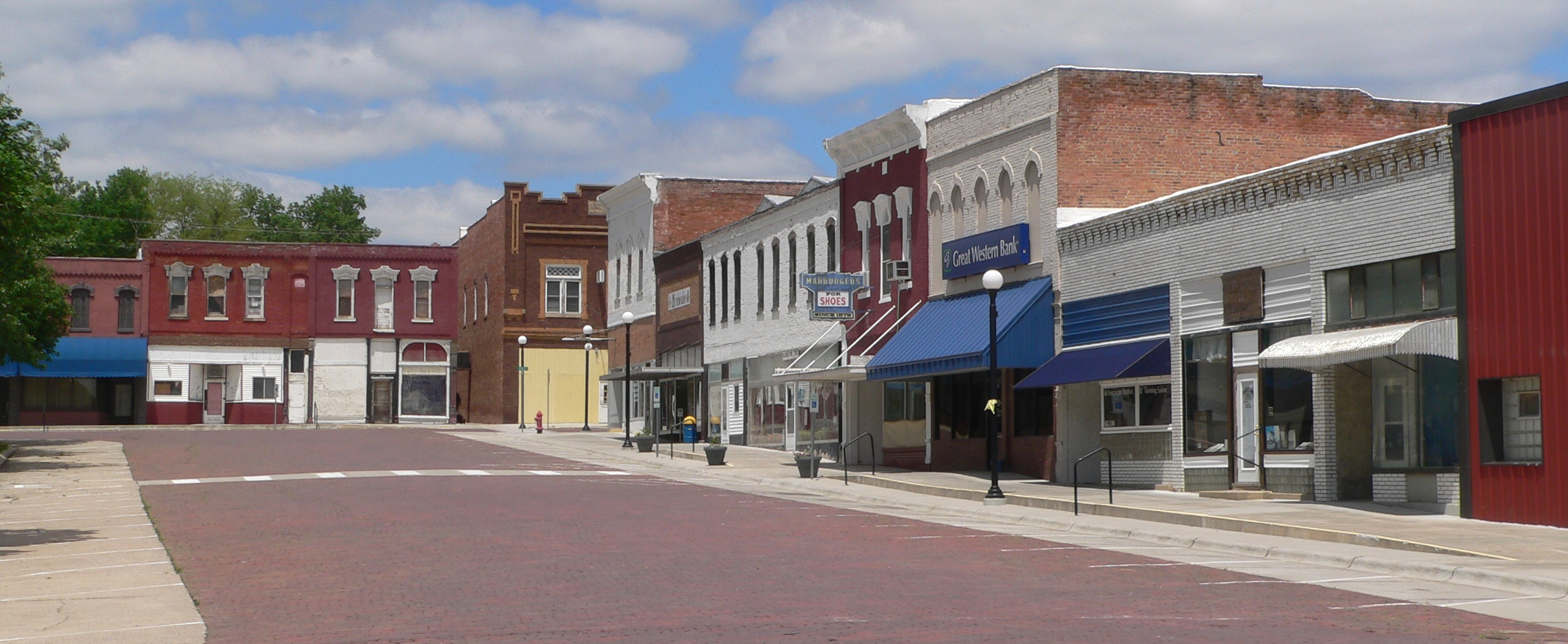
- Downtown Humboldt: east side of town square, June 2013

- Location of Humboldt, Nebraska
- Coordinates: 40°09′57″N 95°56′40″W
- Country: United States
- State: Nebraska
- County: Richardson

Area
  - Total: 1.34 sq mi (3.46 km^{2})
  - Land: 1.34 sq mi (3.46 km^{2})
  - Water: 0 sq mi (0.00 km^{2})
- Elevation: 1,020 ft (310 m)

Population (2020)
  - Total: 800
  - Density: 600/sq mi (231.5/km^{2})
- Time zone: UTC-6 (Central (CST))
  - Summer (DST): UTC-5 (CDT)
- ZIP code: 68376
- Area code: 402
- FIPS code: 31-23445
- GNIS feature ID: 2394445
- Website: ci.humboldt.ne.us

Humboldt is a city in Richardson County, Nebraska, United States. The population was 800 at the 2020 census.

== History ==
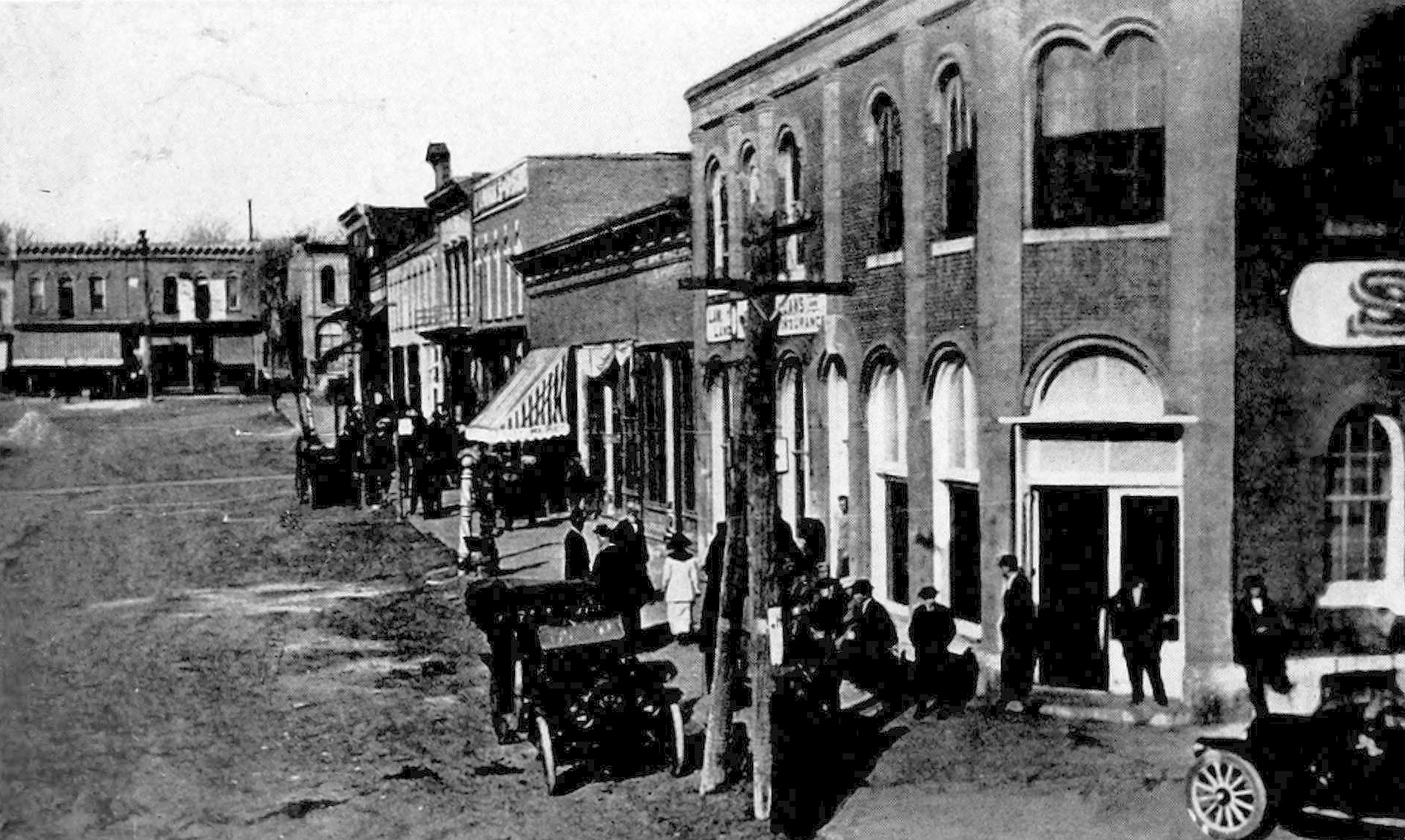
East side of public square, 1917

Humboldt was platted in 1868. It was named after Humboldt, Tennessee, where an early settler had stayed while fighting in the Civil War.

In December 1993, Humboldt was the site of a triple murder. The victims were Phillip DeVine, Lisa Lambert, and Brandon Teena, a transgender man.

Three Ball Charlie, pictured on the cover of The Rolling Stones' album Exile on Main St., grew up in Humboldt.

== Geography ==
According to the United States Census Bureau, the city has a total area of 1.33 square miles (3.44 km^{2}), all land.

== Demographics ==
Historical population
Census	Pop.	Note	%±
1880	917		—
1890	1,114		21.5%
1900	1,218		9.3%
1910	1,176		−3.4%
1920	1,277		8.6%
1930	1,435		12.4%
1940	1,386		−3.4%
1950	1,404		1.3%
1960	1,322		−5.8%
1970	1,194		−9.7%
1980	1,176		−1.5%
1990	1,003		−14.7%
2000	941		−6.2%
2010	877		−6.8%
2020	800		−8.8%
U.S. Decennial Census

=== 2010 census ===
As of the census of 2010, there were 877 people, 385 households, and 213 families living in the city. The population density was 659.4 inhabitants per square mile (254.6/km^{2}). There were 470 housing units at an average density of 353.4 per square mile (136.4/km^{2}). The racial makeup of the city was 97.1% White, 0.5% African American, 1.7% Native American, 0.2% from other races, and 0.5% from two or more races. Hispanic or Latino people of any race were 1.4% of the population.

There were 385 households, of which 23.1% had children under the age of 18 living with them, 45.2% were married couples living together, 7.3% had a female householder with no husband present, 2.9% had a male householder with no wife present, and 44.7% were non-families. 40.8% of all households were made up of individuals, and 19% had someone living alone who was 65 years of age or older. The average household size was 2.15 and the average family size was 2.87.

The median age in the city was 48.6 years. 21.4% of residents were under the age of 18; 5.1% were between the ages of 18 and 24; 18.8% were from 25 to 44; 26.3% were from 45 to 64; and 28.5% were 65 years of age or older. The gender makeup of the city was 47.1% male and 52.9% female.

=== 2000 census ===
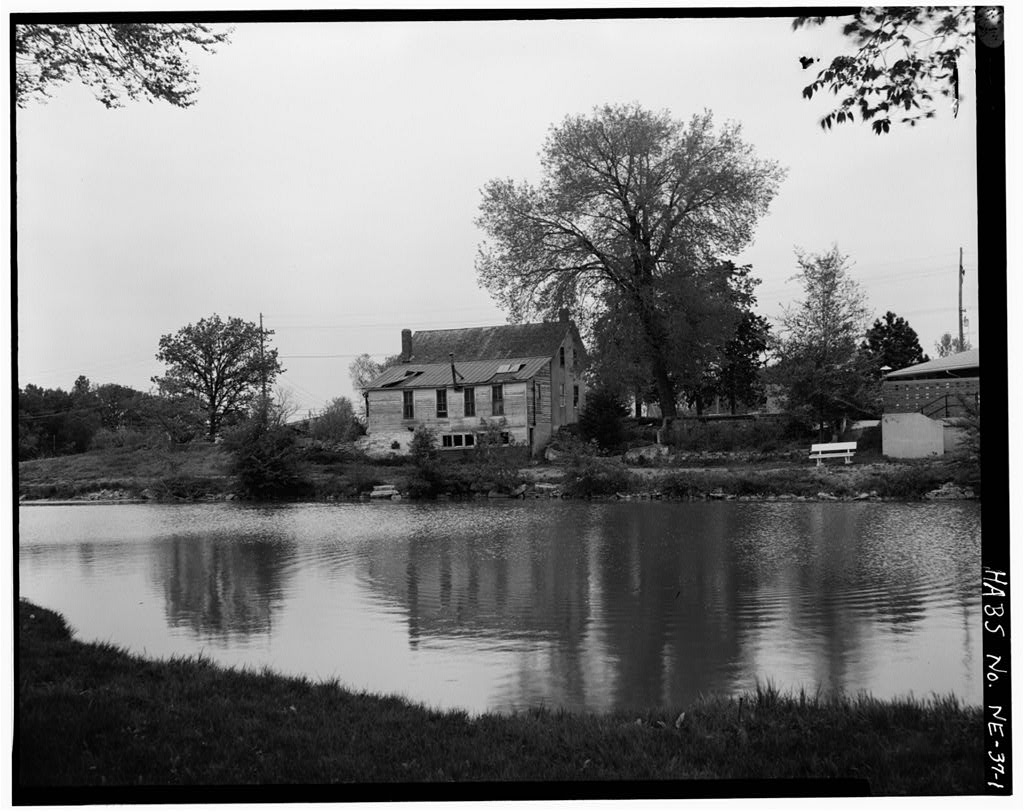
Reuel Nims Store in Humboldt in 1885. This building was demolished in 1980.

As of the census of 2000, there were 941 people, 427 households, and 239 families living in the city. The population density was 703.5 inhabitants per square mile (271.6/km^{2}). There were 508 housing units at an average density of 379.8 per square mile (146.6/km^{2}). The racial makeup of the city was 96.17% White, 0.64% African American, 2.02% Native American, 0.11% Asian, 0.21% from other races, and 0.85% from two or more races. Hispanic or Latino people of any race were 1.81% of the population.

There were 427 households, out of which 23.0% had children under the age of 18 living with them, 44.7% were married couples living together, 7.5% had a female householder with no husband present, and 44.0% were non-families. 40.3% of all households were made up of individuals, and 25.8% had someone living alone who was 65 years of age or older. The average household size was 2.10 and the average family size was 2.79.

In the city, the population was spread out, with 21.1% under the age of 18, 4.8% from 18 to 24, 20.2% from 25 to 44, 21.6% from 45 to 64, and 32.3% who were 65 years of age or older. The median age was 48 years. For every 100 females, there were 86.3 males. For every 100 females age 18 and over, there were 83.7 males.

As of 2000 the median income for a household in the city was $27,672, and the median income for a family was $37,692. Males had a median income of $25,650 versus $20,909 for females. The per capita income for the city was $16,968. About 8.7% of families and 13.6% of the population were below the poverty line, including 23.1% of those under age 18 and 9.0% of those age 65 or over.

== Education ==
Humboldt is served by Humboldt Table Rock Steinauer School District #70.

== Notable people ==
- Morris N. Hughes Jr., ambassador
- Guy Hartsel Hummel, farmer and political figure
- Don Ingalls, screenwriter and TV producer
- Richard S. Molony, U.S. representative
- F. W. Sweeney, college football player, coach, and railroad executive
- Brandon Teena, an American trans man, was raped and murdered in Humboldt. His death led to increased lobbying for hate crime laws in the United States.
- Eugene A. Tucker, attorney and politician

== See also ==
- List of municipalities in Nebraska
