= Holman House =

Holman House may refer to:

in Australia

- Holman House, Dover Heights, Sydney, New South Wales

in the United States

(by state, then city)

- J. D. Holman House, Ozark, Alabama, listed on the National Register of Historic Places (NRHP) in Dale County
- M. P. Holman House, Faribault, Minnesota, listed on the NRHP in Rice County
- John Holman House, Humboldt, Nebraska, listed on the NRHP in Richardson County
- White-Holman House, Raleigh, North Carolina, listed on the NRHP in Wake County
- Rufus C. Holman House, Portland, Oregon, NRHP-listed
- Cardwell–Holman House, Portland, Oregon, NRHP-listed
- J.B. Holman House, Batesburg-Leesville, South Carolina, NRHP-listed
- Judge William Shields Holman House, Bay City, Texas, listed on the NRHP in Texas
- Samuel Holman House, Park City, Utah, listed on the NRHP in Summit County
