= Gov. Arthur J. Weaver House =

- U.S. National Register of Historic Places
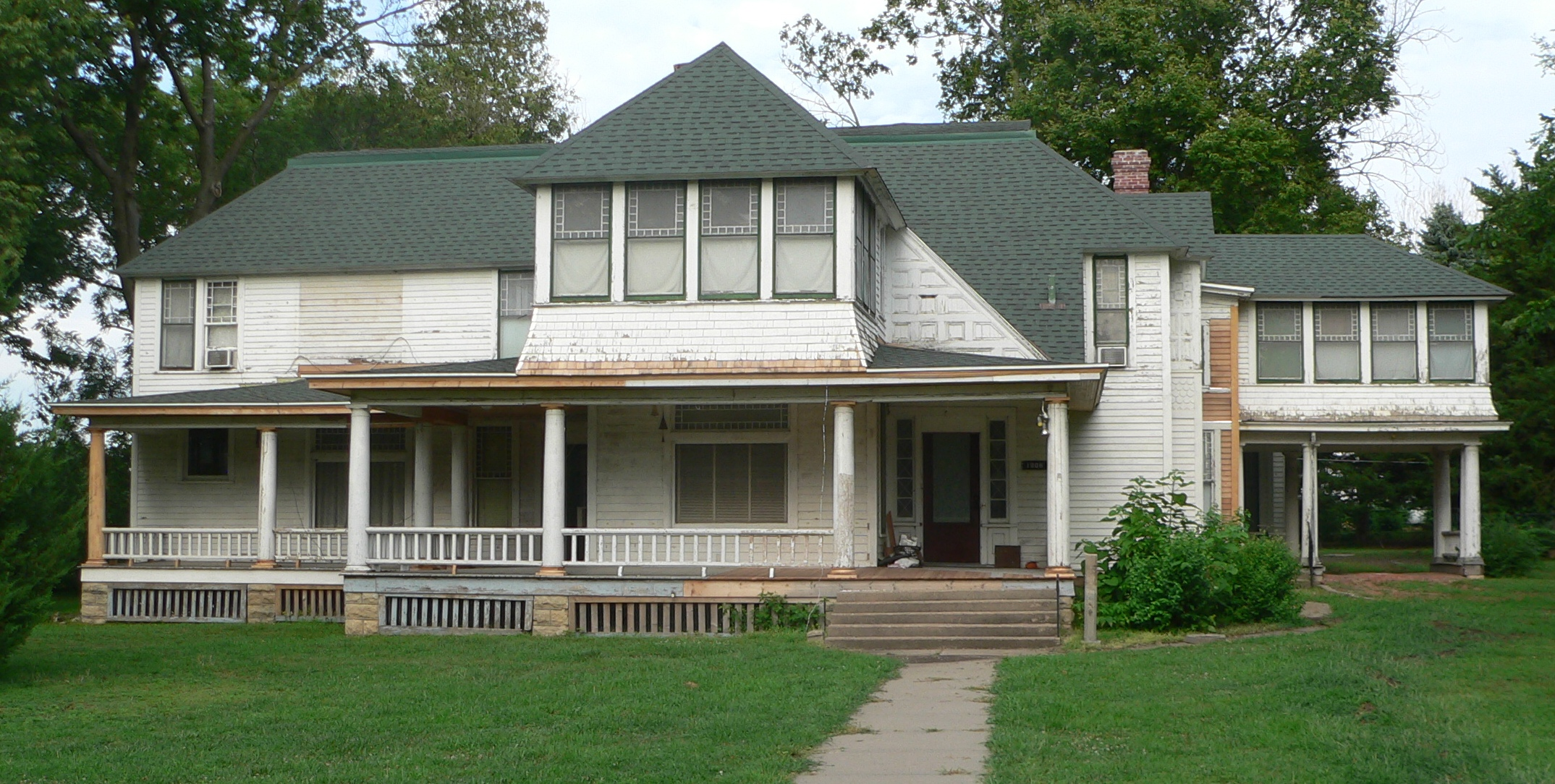
- The house in 2012

- Location within Nebraska Location within the United States
- Location: 1906 Fulton Street, Falls City, Nebraska
- Coordinates: 40°03′51″N 95°35′50″W
- Area: less than one acre
- Built: 1920
- Architectural style: Queen Anne, Stick/eastlake
- NRHP reference No.: 05000356
- Added to NRHP: April 27, 2005

The Gov. Arthur J. Weaver House is a historic house in Falls City, Nebraska. It was built in 1920 for Arthur J. Weaver, who served as the 22nd governor of Nebraska from 1929 to 1931. It was designed in the Queen Anne and Stick/eastlake architectural styles. It has been listed on the National Register of Historic Places since April 27, 2005.
