= National Register of Historic Places listings in Richardson County, Nebraska =

Location of Richardson County in Nebraska

Richardson County, Nebraska, United States, has 13 properties and districts listed on the National Register of Historic Places, including one National Historic Landmark. The locations of National Register properties and districts for which the latitude and longitude coordinates are included below, may be seen in a map.

This National Park Service list is complete through NPS recent listings posted March 27, 2026.

== Current listings ==
	Name on the Register	Image	Date listed	Location	City or town	Description
1	R.A. Clark House	R.A. Clark House	July 7, 2015 (#15000395)	805 Vine St. 40°14′09″N 95°46′22″W	Stella	
2	Falls City Commercial Historic District	Falls City Commercial Historic District	December 31, 2013 (#13001023)	Roughly Stone St. from 15th to 19th Sts. 40°03′42″N 95°36′10″W	Falls City	
3	Gehling's Theatre	Gehling's Theatre	September 28, 1988 (#88000942)	1519 Stone St. 40°03′38″N 95°36′11″W	Falls City	
4	John Holman House	John Holman House	April 25, 1972 (#72000756)	947 Nemaha St. 40°10′12″N 95°56′44″W	Humboldt	
5	Humboldt Commercial Historic District	Humboldt Commercial Historic District	September 7, 2005 (#05000999)	Western Square of 4th St. to Eastern Square, to 3rd St. 40°09′48″N 95°56′48″W	Humboldt	
6	Leary Site	Leary Site	October 15, 1966 (#66000449)	Southern half of Section 33 and western half of Section 34, Township 1 North, Range 18 East; 40°00′06″N 95°23′42″W	Rulo	
7	Miles Ranch	Miles Ranch	December 19, 2012 (#12001075)	63795 638 Ave. 40°05′21″N 95°51′38″W	Dawson	
8	Mount Zion Brick Church	Mount Zion Brick Church	December 1, 1988 (#88002763)	Northwest of Barada: 718 Rd. and 651 Ave. 40°13′58″N 95°36′56″W	Barada	
9	Richardson County Courthouse	Richardson County Courthouse	July 5, 1990 (#90000965)	Courthouse Sq. 40°03′44″N 95°36′08″W	Falls City	
10	Alfred and Magdalena Schmid Farmstead	Alfred and Magdalena Schmid Farmstead	November 16, 2005 (#05001292)	South-southwest of Dawson; 40°01′40″N 95°52′56″W	Dawson	
11	Site No. RH00-062	Site No. RH00-062	June 19, 1987 (#87001001)	6½ miles southeast of Rulo; 200 feet west of the road between Rulo and White Cloud, Kansas; 40°00′00″N 95°19′55″W	Rulo	Extends into Doniphan County, Kansas
12	Way Side Stock Farm	Way Side Stock Farm	March 17, 2015 (#15000090)	64480 718 Rd. 40°14′00″N 95°43′57″W	Stella vicinity	
13	Gov. Arthur J. Weaver House	Gov. Arthur J. Weaver House	April 27, 2005 (#05000356)	1906 Fulton St. 40°03′51″N 95°35′43″W	Falls City	

== Former listing ==
	Name on the Register	Image	Date listed	Date removed	Location	City or town	Description
1	Rulo Bridge	Rulo Bridge	January 4, 1993 (#92000718)	November 16, 2015	U.S. Route 159 over the Missouri River; 40°03′14″N 95°25′14″W	Rulo	Spanned the Missouri River to Holt County, Missouri. The bridge was demolished in two events, January 19 and February 5, 2015, after a new bridge had been built.

== See also ==
- List of National Historic Landmarks in Nebraska
- National Register of Historic Places listings in Nebraska
