= Gehling's Theatre =

- U.S. National Register of Historic Places
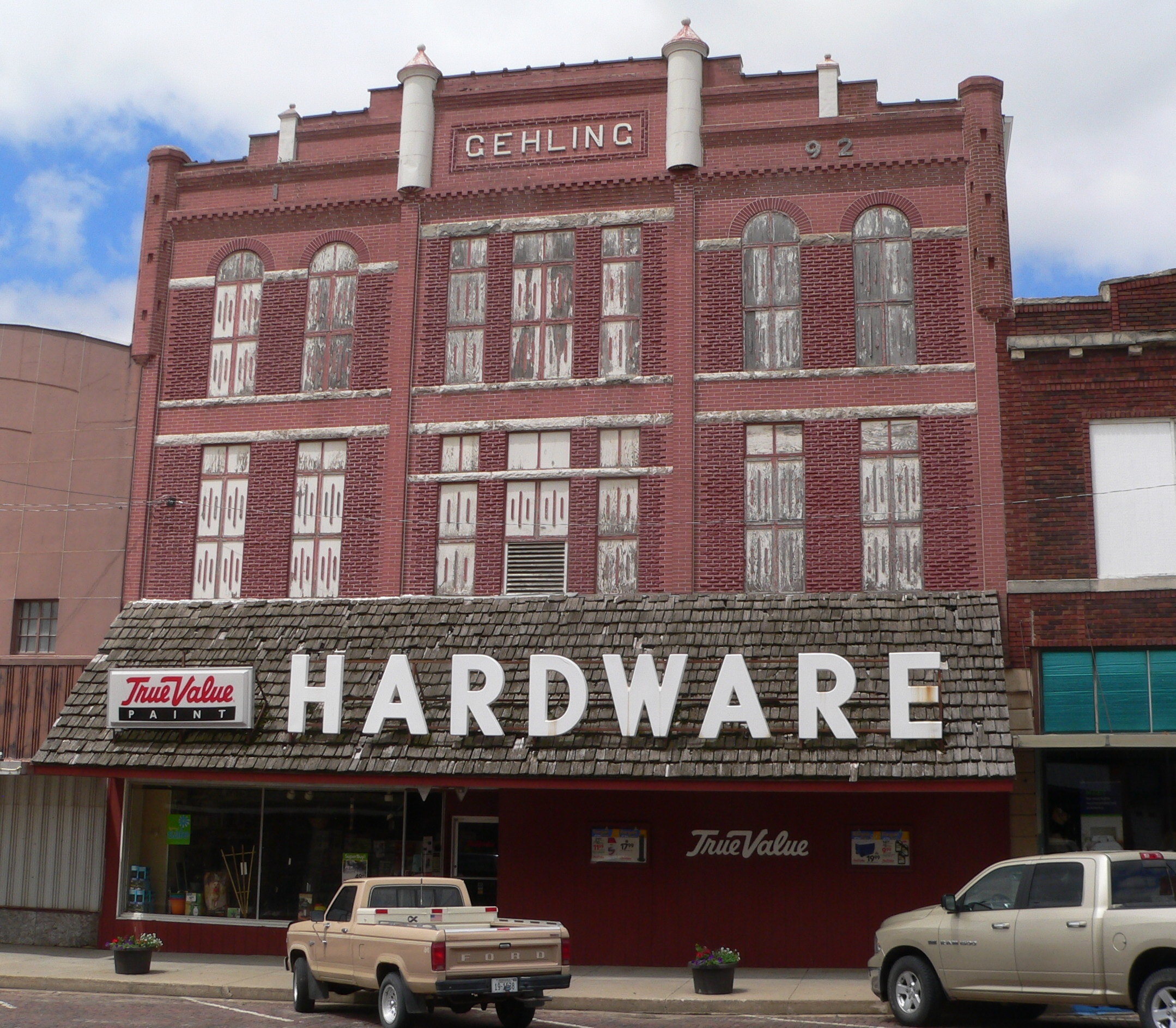
- The building in 2013

- Location within Nebraska Location within the United States
- Location: 1592 Stone Street, Falls City, Nebraska
- Coordinates: 40°03′37″N 95°36′10″W
- Area: less than one acre
- Built: 1892
- Built by: Charles H. Herman
- Architectural style: Two-part commercial block
- MPS: Opera House Buildings in Nebraska 1867-1917 MPS
- NRHP reference No.: 88000942
- Added to NRHP: September 28, 1988

Gehling's Theatre is a historic three-story building in Falls City, Nebraska. It was built with red bricks in 1892–1893, with a 78 feet long and 50 feet wide auditorium and a 25 feet wide and 24 feet high proscenium inside. It was named for the original owners, the Gehlings, who also owned a brewery. Silent movies, minstrel shows and performances were shown in the theatre. The building has been listed on the National Register of Historic Places since September 28, 1988.
