= Stephen Boyd Miles =

American cattle rancher

Stephen Boyd Miles circa 1882

Colonel Stephen Boyd Miles (January 9, 1822 – October 30, 1898) was a frontiersman, stagecoach magnate, cattle rancher, banker and philanthropist in Nebraska and the greater American Midwest. His obituary in the Falls City Journal stated, "Mr. Miles was a man of great business ability and accumulated much of this world's goods, and left a fortune gained by hard effort, much of it literally dug in the sweat of his brow from the virgin soil of a new country."

== Early life ==
He was born in Delta, Pennsylvania, on January 9, 1822. He was the son of Thomas and Sarah Boyd Miles. Stephen's grandfather, Joseph Miles, had immigrated to the American colonies from Liverpool, England, in 1732, and fought during the American Revolution.

Miles was raised on the family farm. When he was sixteen, he went to work for his uncle, Stephen Boyd, in Boyd's mail contract business. By the age of 22, Miles was able to secure his own mail contract to transport mail between Baltimore and Washington, D.C. In 1845, Miles married Hannah Scarborough. To that union, four children were born: Caroline, Victorine, Joseph, and Samuel. Miles held the Baltimore – Washington, D.C. mail contract for 10 years, until 1854. During this time, he also transported mail in Pennsylvania and Maryland.

== Mail transport ==
Through his connections in Washington, D.C., Miles was able to acquire contracts to transport mail in the Great West. It is believed he may have traveled west as early as 1852 to scout the territory and lay the foundations for his business. According to some accounts, he was transporting mail, freight and passengers between Independence, Missouri, and Salt Lake City, Utah, by 1854. In his enterprise, Miles employed many men and owned hundreds of horses and mules, in addition to wagons and stagecoaches. He also possessed stagecoach stations along his mail route.

There were many dangers and hardships associated with stagecoach travel. The rugged terrain, unpredictable weather, and the possibilities of attack by bandits or Native Americans were just some of the dangers. Despite the difficulties, Miles made many of the trips himself.

In 1855, Miles settled in Richardson County, Nebraska, and established his headquarters in Grant Precinct, which became known as the great Miles Ranch. The ranch was strategically located along the Overland Trail, and was the first of the great ranches west of the Missouri River. The ranch was a city in and of itself. At the ranch, multiple buildings were erected, including several barns, a bunkhouse, silos, and numerous other houses. An elaborate water system was created to supply the needs of the ranch. A post office was run out of the first, crude house. A general store, blacksmith shop, and sawmill were located on the property. As a stagecoach stop, the Miles Ranch offered lodging for weary travelers.

In the aftermath of the Mormon Rebellion (1857-1858), President James Buchanan awarded an exclusive mail contract to Colonel Miles to transport mail from Independence, Missouri, to Salt Lake City, Utah, valued at $32,000.00. In addition to his main mail route, Miles started branch stage lines in southern Nebraska, northern Kansas, central Missouri, and Iowa. As partial payment for his services, the Colonel accepted "mail grant land". This consisted of a section of land at intervals, which he was later able to sell to expand the Miles Ranch and finance his other businesses.

As a result of his various mail contracts, stage lines, and land acquisitions, Miles accumulated a sizeable fortune, which gave him considerable political influence. In 1859, he was one of four members appointed to represent the Nebraska Territory at an inter-territorial committee. Four members representing the Kansas Territory were also present. The committee met in Lecompton, Kansas. The purpose of the meeting was to discuss the creation of a new state. This newly proposed state would have the Platte River as its northern border and the Kansas River as the southern border. The committee did not succeed in forming the new state, primarily due to disagreements over the issue of slavery.

== Ranching ==
In 1866, following the Civil War, Miles added yet another mail contract. This line ran to Texas and was held for four years. It is believed that, around this time, Miles became heavily engaged in cattle ranching, as the demand for beef in the east continued to increase dramatically. It was, also, around this time that Miles took an interest in banking and was a stockholder of the National Bank of St. Louis.

At the end of his Texas mail contract, Miles had the business foresight to know that the overland mail, freight, and stage line business would soon come to an end with the rapid expansion of the railroad. Rather than fighting the inevitable, Colonel Miles withdrew from the mail, freight, and stage line business in 1871 and used his influence to expedite the arrival of the railroad to southeast Nebraska. Miles understood the rail system would provide fast and safe transport of his cattle to the Chicago markets and consequently provide higher profits for his ranching business.

With the help of his two sons, Joseph and Samuel, Colonel Miles drove thousands of cattle from Texas to the Miles Ranch. It is estimated, that around this time, the ranch may have had as much as 42,000 acres (170 km^{2}) of land and employed hundreds of people.

== Banking ==
As usual, Miles directed his attention to numerous areas, other than just ranching. In 1872, he was one of the organizers of the Commercial Bank of St. Louis and a director for many years. By 1876, he was co-vice president of the Democratic State Convention in Omaha. He also purchased the Falls City Press around that time.

In 1882, Miles founded the First National Bank of Falls City, which was the first bank in Richardson County, Nebraska. He remained its president until his death. In 1884, he organized the Bank of Rulo and also served as president of that institution until his death. In 1890, he founded the Miles National Bank of Delta, Pennsylvania, and served as president until 1894, when he sold his interests to his son, Joseph. He was instrumental in establishing the Bankers' National Bank of Chicago, and was a stockholder until his death.

In addition to his various occupations, Miles showed his generosity and compassion for others. He was described as having his "purse…open in time of need or distress." He was active in, and a long-time member of, the International Order of Odd Fellows. A year before his death, Miles demonstrated his dedication to the order by presenting the lodge with the brick business block at the corner of Stone and 4th Street in Falls City, Nebraska. He also took a specific interest in the families who worked in his employ. He brought them to Nebraska, built housing for them, and helped them get established.

Miles' generosity went beyond financial help. Local newspapers documented his kindness to the children on the Miles Ranch. One account tells how Miles asked a 10-year-old boy if he wanted to travel to Rulo with him. The boy's excitement was almost immeasurable at the thought of riding in the fancy carriage, pulled by the beautiful, black, matching, team of horses. Of course, the boy happily accepted the invitation and, with fond memories, later recalled how Miles allowed him to even drive the carriage a short distance. Another story is that Miles always carried raisins in his pockets. He would distribute them to the children on the ranch. To the children, Miles' pocket seemed to be bottomless.

Miles died on October 30, 1898, at the age of 76. He died a millionaire and one of the wealthiest men in the state of Nebraska. The exact cause of death was unknown.

== See also ==
- Overland Trail
- Stagecoach
- Utah War
