= Tacy Atkinson =

Christian missionary who served in the Ottoman Empire

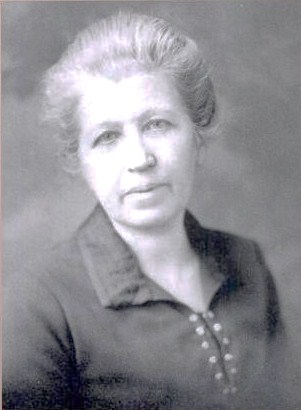
Tacy Atkinson

Tacy Atkinson (July 3, 1870 – December 1, 1937) was an American Christian missionary who served in the Ottoman Empire during World War I and the Armenian genocide. As a witness to the Armenian genocide, her accounts of the Armenian genocide provide an important insight to the event. She is also known for helping many Armenians escape the massacres.

== Early life ==
Tacy Atkinson was born Tacy Adelia Wilkson on July 3, 1870, in Salem, Nebraska, to parents of Scottish and Irish ancestry. The family later moved to Independence, Kansas, where she attended the local high school. She continued her studies at Park College in Parkville, Missouri. After a year at Park, she went with friends on a vacation trip to Oregon. She liked the state enough that she decided live there, and found a position teaching first grade. During her years in Oregon, she also continued her education, ultimately graduating from Pacific University in 1899, at the age of twenty-nine.

When she was thirty, Wilkson was diagnosed with a breast tumor. She went to a hospital in San Francisco for treatment of the non-malignant mass, where she met her future husband Herbert Atkinson, a medical intern. Herbert Atkinson and Tacy Wilkson married in San Rafael, California, on July 7, 1901, shortly after her thirty-first birthday. Herbert's family had been Christian missionary workers for generations. Tacy and Herbert eventually joined the Christian missionary movement and arrived in Kharpert in the Ottoman Empire in 1902. The Atkinsons remained in Kharpert until August 19, 1908, when they returned to the United States to raise funds for the construction of a new hospital. They returned to Kharpert on October 23, 1909. Tacy remained there through the first years of World War I, not leaving until 1917, after the U.S. joined the conflict.

== Armenian genocide ==
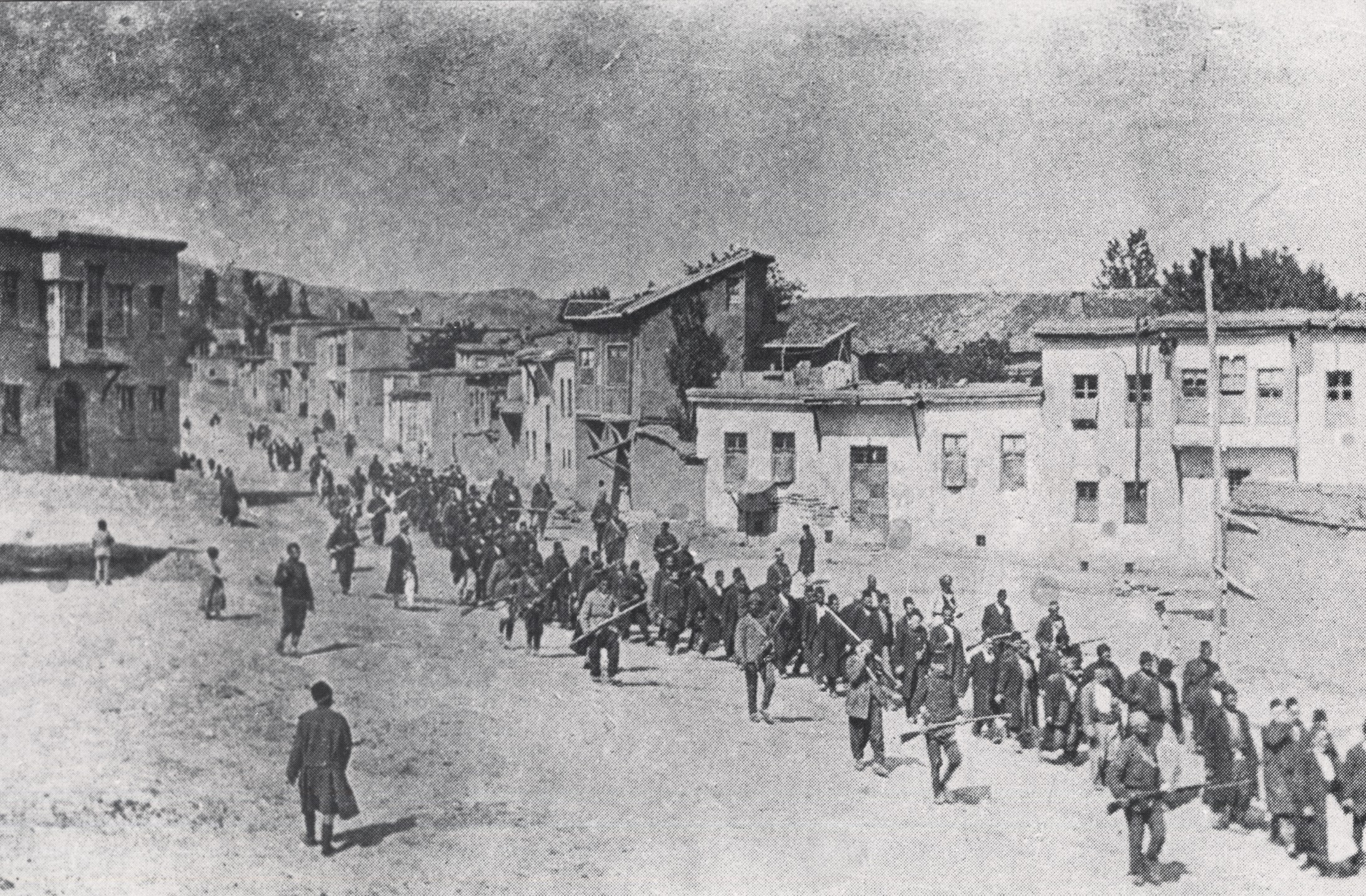
Armenian civilians, escorted by armed Ottoman soldiers, are marched through Harput (known as Kharpert by Armenians, the kaza of the Mamuret-ul Aziz), to a prison in the nearby Mezireh

During the Armenian genocide, which started in 1915, Atkinson was stationed in the Kharpert where she was a participant of the Christian missionary movement there. Due to the fact that Herbert Atkinson was a respected man in the region, Tacy Atkinson had an opportunity to gain firsthand knowledge of the inner workings of the local government and become familiar with the deportees. Much of what she wrote was written in her diary that she had kept throughout the time period. However, Atkinson was reluctant to describe the events in full because she feared that the Turkish authorities might uncover her diary.

Atkinson wrote about the deportations which began while she was in Kharpert:

What an awful sight. People shoved out of their houses, the doors nailed, and they were piled into oxcarts or on donkeys and many on foot. Police and gendarmes armed, shoving them along. Yesterday a large crowd of women from Kughi arrived but no men. Their men were all killed or in prison and all their girls carried away.

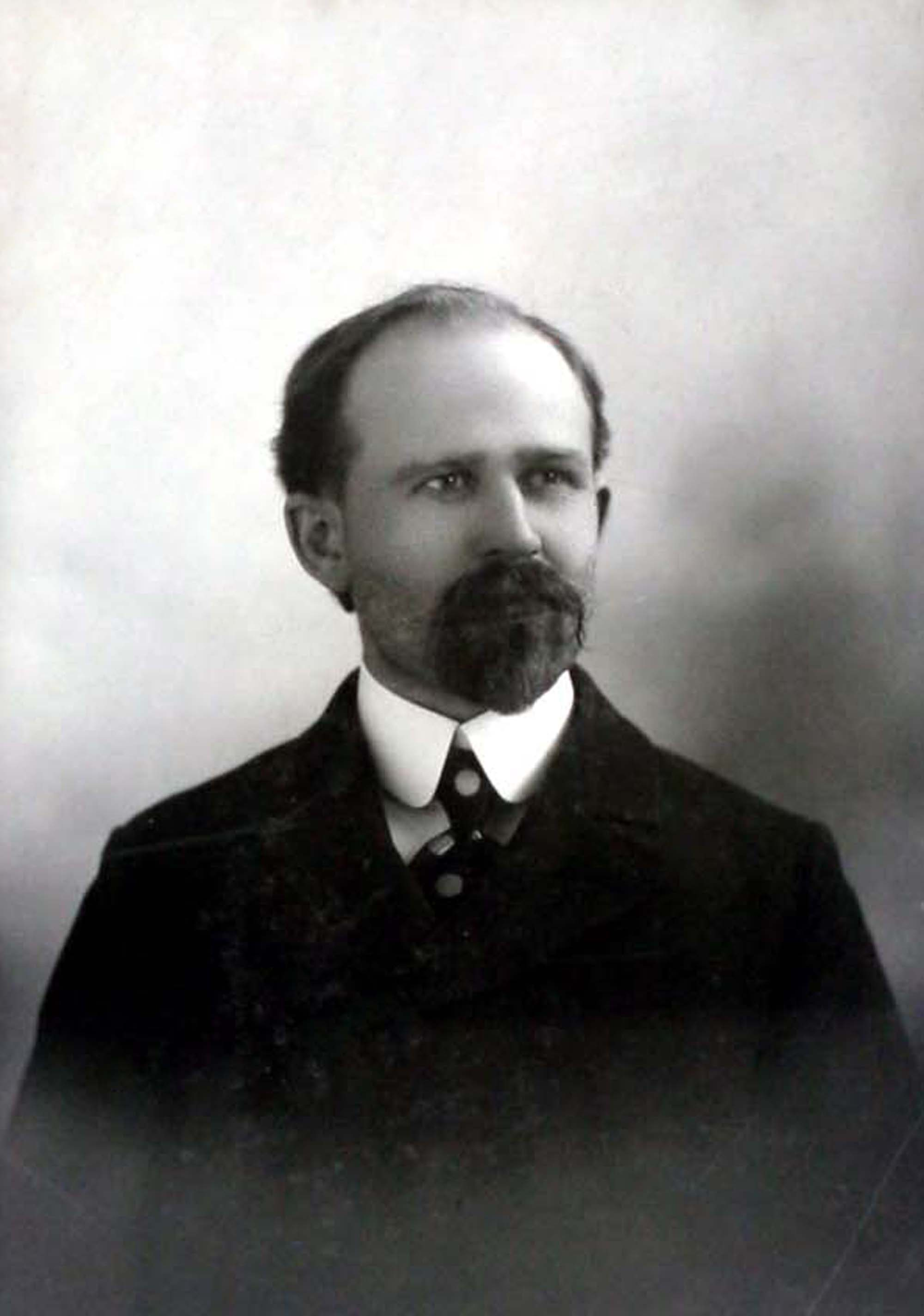
Tacy Atkinson's husband Henry Atkinson also assisted many Armenians escape the massacres

After much of the population was deported, Atkinson went on to write:

Today large crowds have gone from the city. We are told that the people who started Tuesday were taken to Hulakueh only two hours distant. There the men were killed, the girls carried away, and the women robbed and left...We do not know what is still coming. Large crowds of women and children are coming in today. I don't know where from and those who are here are dying as fast as they can, and are being thrown out unburied. Vultures that are usually so thick everywhere all are absent now. They are all out feasting on dead bodies. The women started out today were followed by a large crowd of Kurds and gendarmes.

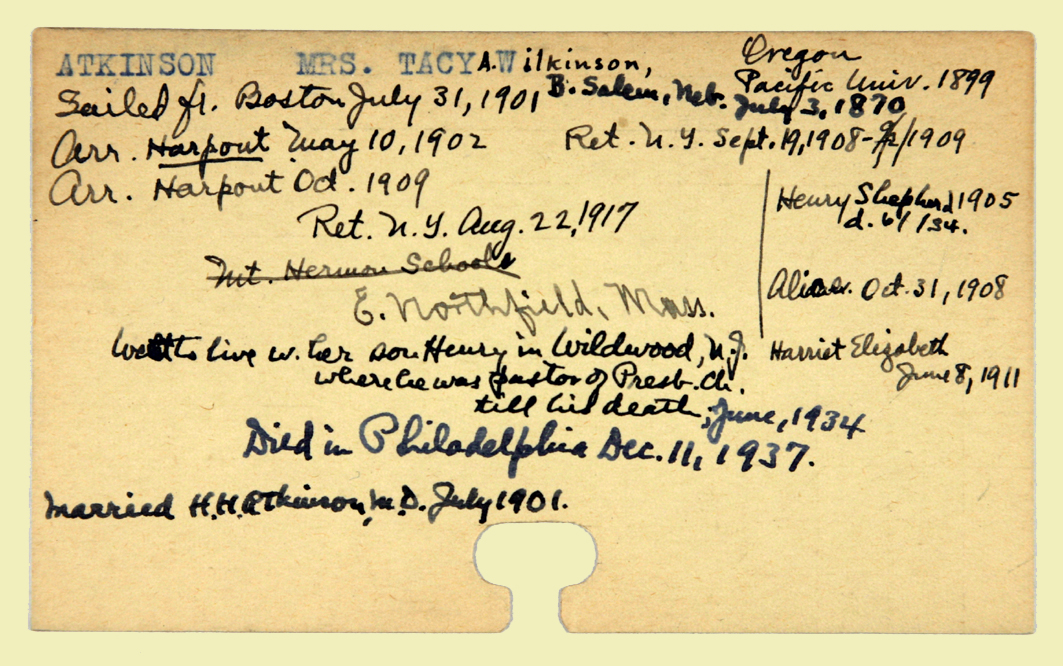
Personnel card of Tacy Atkinson provided by the American Board of Commissioners for Foreign Missions

In regards to the systematic massacres of Armenians, Atkinson believed that calculative and strategic planning could not have been a method employed by the Turkish government alone: "We all know such clear-cut, well planned, all well carried out work is not the method of the Turk. The German, the Turk and the devil made a triple alliance not to be equalled in the world for cold blooded hellishness."

Atkinson along with her husband were especially known for saving the lives of many Armenians. In one instance, she smuggled razor blades into a prison where Armenians were imprisoned so that they could easily escape.

Atkinson also describes a boy who witnessed the massacre of men and women including his own mother:

A boy has arrived in Mezreh in a bad state nervously. As I understand it, he was with a crowd of women and children from some village who joined our prisoners and went out June 23. The boy says that in the gorge this side of Bakir Maden the men and women were all shot and the leading men had their heads cut off afterwards. He escaped and came here. His own mother was stripped and robbed and then shot. He says the valley smells so awful that one can hardly pass by now.

== Later life ==
Tacy Atkinson left the diary in a sealed trunk in her home in Turkey when she left the country in 1917, since the Turkish government prohibited anything written be sent out of the country. Nine years later, the unopened trunk was sent to her in the United States of America.

She had three children: Henry, Alice and Harriet.

== See also ==
- Witnesses and testimonies of the Armenian genocide

== Bibliography ==
- Atkinson, Tacy (2000). J. Michael Hagopian (ed.). "The German, the Turk and the devil made a triple alliance" : Harpoot diaries, 1908-1917. Princeton, NJ: Gomidas Institute. ISBN 1903656001.
- Winter, J. M. (2003). America and the Armenian Genocide of 1915. Cambridge University Press. ISBN 9780511163821.
