= Alfred and Magdalena Schmid Farmstead =

- Schmid, Alfred and Magdalena, Farmstead
- U.S. National Register of Historic Places
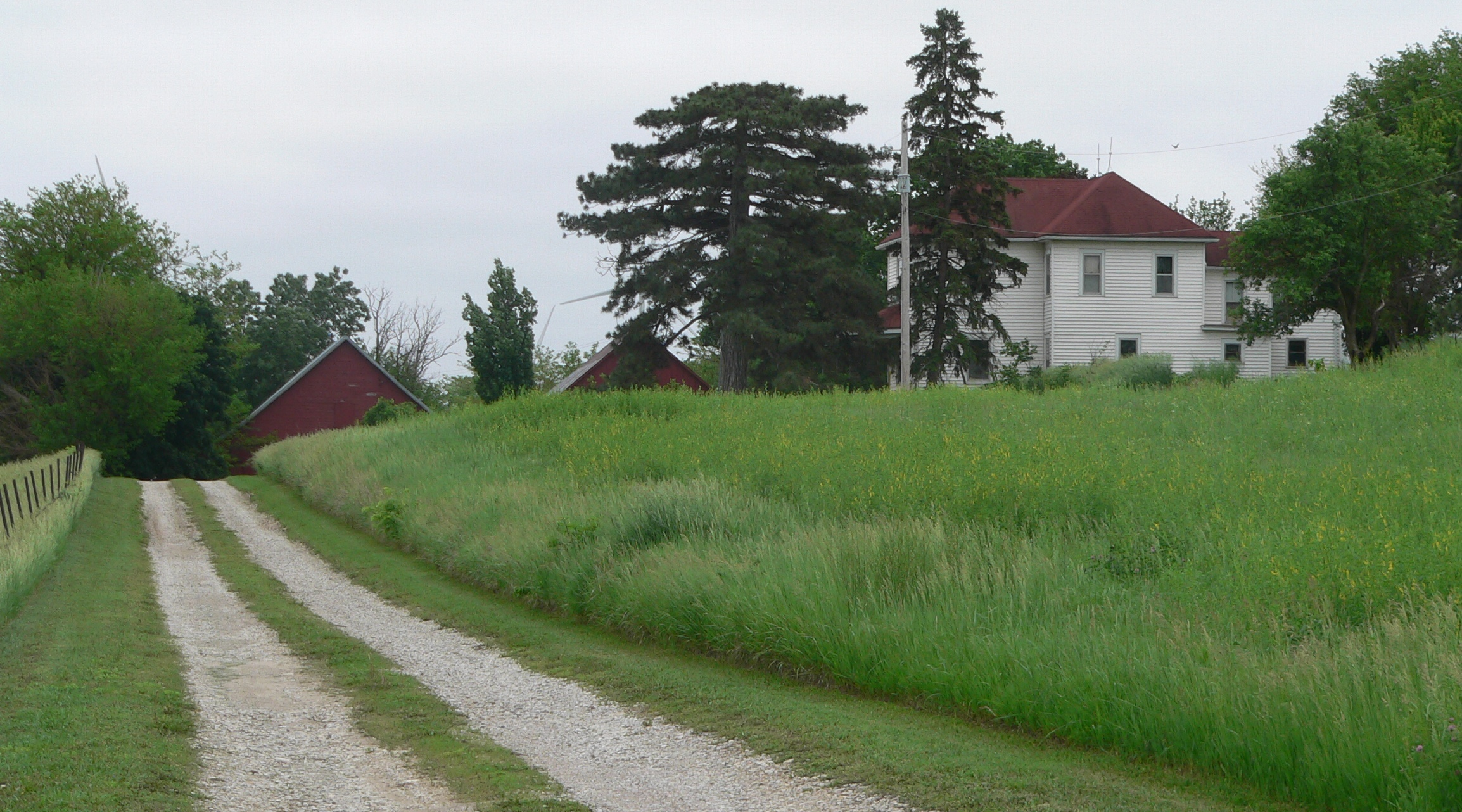
- The farm in 2013

- Location within Nebraska Location within the United States
- Nearest city: Dawson, Nebraska
- Coordinates: 40°01′40″N 95°52′56″W
- Area: 5 acres (2.0 ha)
- Built: pre-1910, 1917
- Built by: Charlie Cordell
- NRHP reference No.: 05001292
- Added to NRHP: November 16, 2005

The Alfred and Magdalena Schmid Farmstead is a historic estate with a farm house, four barns and several outbuildings in Dawson, Nebraska. The farm house was built by Charlie Cordell in 1917 for Alfred Schmid and his wife, née Magdalena Kanel, both immigrants from Switzerland. It was inherited by their son, Alfred Edward Schmid, who was married to Florence Beutler. The Schmid family lived on the farm until the 1970s. The property has been listed on the National Register of Historic Places since November 16, 2005.
