= Itha T. Krumme Memorial Arboretum =

Arboretum in Nebraska

Coordinates: 40°04′10″N 95°36′43″W

The Itha T. Krumme Memorial Arboretum (2 acres) is an arboretum located at West 25th and Stanton Lake Park Road, next to Stanton Lake Park, northwest of Falls City, Nebraska. It is open without charge during daylight hours.

The arboretum features 30 types of trees and 20 varieties of shrubs, grasses, and wildflowers. All are native to Nebraska. Trees include paw paw, shagbark hickory, and all Nebraska-native oak species.

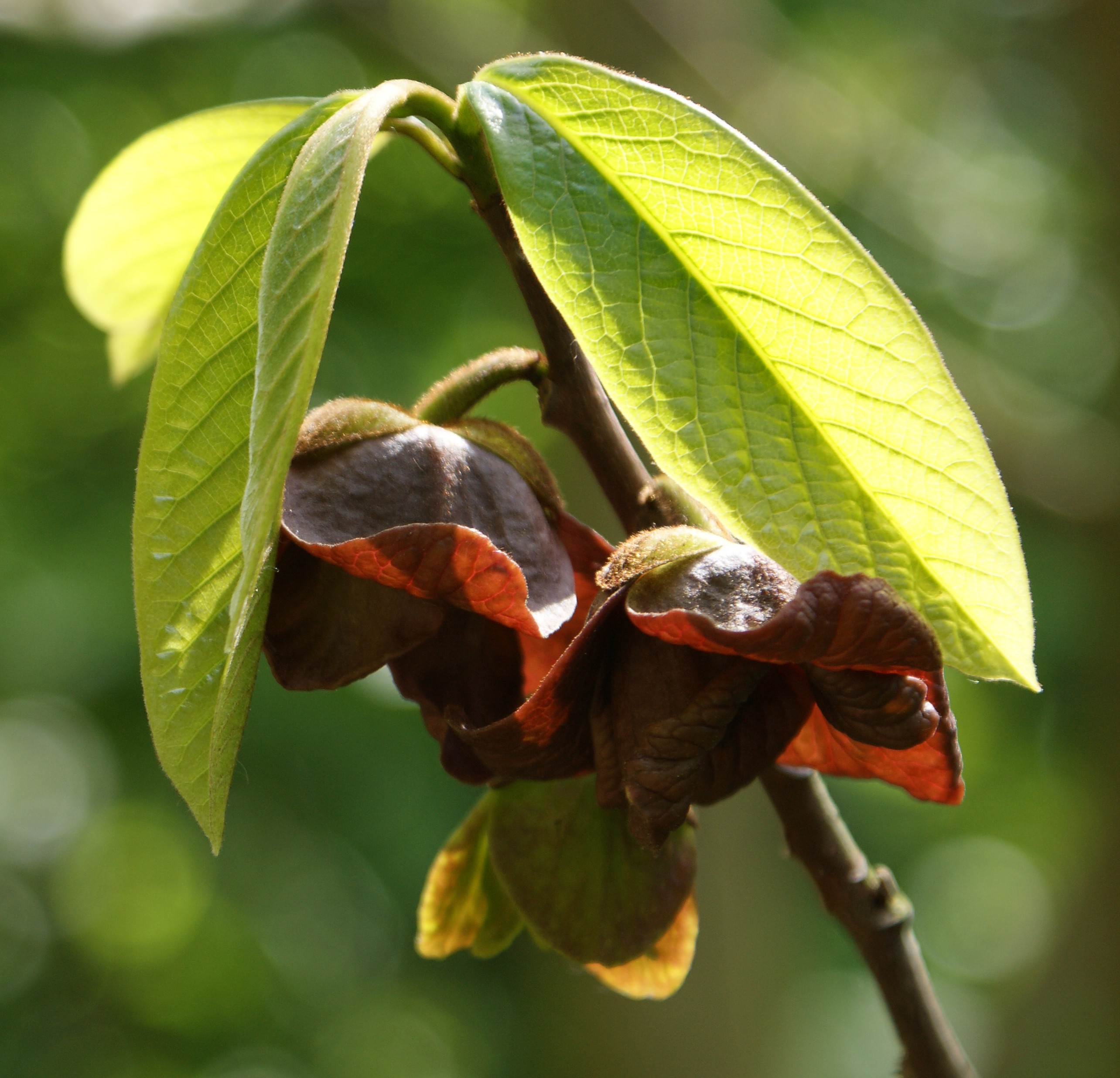
Itha T. Krumme Memorial Arboretum

== See also ==
- List of botanical gardens in the United States
