= Falls City Sacred Heart Catholic School =

Catholic school in southeastern Nebraska, U.S.

Location
- 1820 Fulton Street; Falls City, (Richardson County), Nebraska 68355; United States; 40°3′48″N 95°35′41″W

Information
- Type: Private, coeducational
- Religious affiliation: Roman Catholic
- Established: 1891
- Principal: Jenny Dunn
- Grades: K-12
- Gender: Mixed
  - Grade 9: 9
  - Grade 10: 15
  - Grade 11: 16
  - Grade 12: 18
- Hours in school day: 8
- Campus size: 1 city block
- Colors: Green and white
- Slogan: "Family Educating the heart, mind, body, spirit for this life, and the next."
- Athletics: Football, volleyball, basketball, track
- Athletics conference: Pioneer Conference, MUDECAS Conference
- Mascot: Leprechaun
- Team name: Irish
- Rival: Nebraska City Lourdes, Humboldt-Table Rock-Steiner, Falls City Public
- Accreditation: Cognia Accreditation
- Publication: Irish Spotlight
- Football Coach: Doug Goltz
- Volleyball Coach: Emma Ebel
- Men’s Basketball Coach: Doug Goltz
- Women’s basketball coach: Luke Santo
- Track and Field Coach: Brian Lemerond
- Website: https://fcsacredheart.org/

Falls City Sacred Heart Catholic School is a private, Roman Catholic K-12 school in Falls City, Nebraska, United States. It is located in the Roman Catholic Diocese of Lincoln.

== Athletics ==
Sacred Heart is a member of the Nebraska School Activities Association. They have won the following NSAA State Championships:

- Boys' football – 1972, 1989, 1990, 1991, 1992, 1993, 1994, 2013, 2016
- Girls' volleyball – 1997, 2006 (runner-up - 1998, 2002), 2021, 2023
- Boys' basketball – 1988, 1989, 1990, 1991, 1999, 2001, 2004, 2008, 2018, 2020 (runner-up - 1947, 1974)
- Girls' basketball - 1998, 1999, 2000, 2015, 2017, 2018, 2022, 2023, 2025 (runner-up - 2002, 2003, 2007)
- Boys' track and field – 1990, 1991, 1993, 1994, 1998, 2006, 2014
- Girls' track and field - 1998, 1999, 2000, 2001

The Irish once had a national record of 87 consecutive wins in football from 1989–1995. In 1993–1994, the Irish won the triple crown twice, by winning state championships in football, basketball and track.
