= Samuel Holman House =

- U.S. National Register of Historic Places
- Location within Utah Location within the United States
- Location: 307 Norfolk St., Park City, Utah
- Coordinates: 40°38′30″N 111°29′47″W
- Area: 0.1 acres (0.040 ha)
- Built: c.1900
- MPS: Mining Boom Era Houses TR
- NRHP reference No.: 84002290
- Added to NRHP: July 12, 1984

The Samuel Holman House, at 307 Norfolk St. in Park City, Utah, was built around 1900. It was listed on the National Register of Historic Places in 1984.

It is a one-story frame pyramid house, and has a truncated pyramid roof.

It may have been moved, or subsumed within a larger structure, or demolished, because in 2019 satellite views and 2007 Google streetview there appears to be no surviving pyramid house near its address.
