= Salem, Nebraska =

Village in Richardson County, Nebraska, United States

- Village
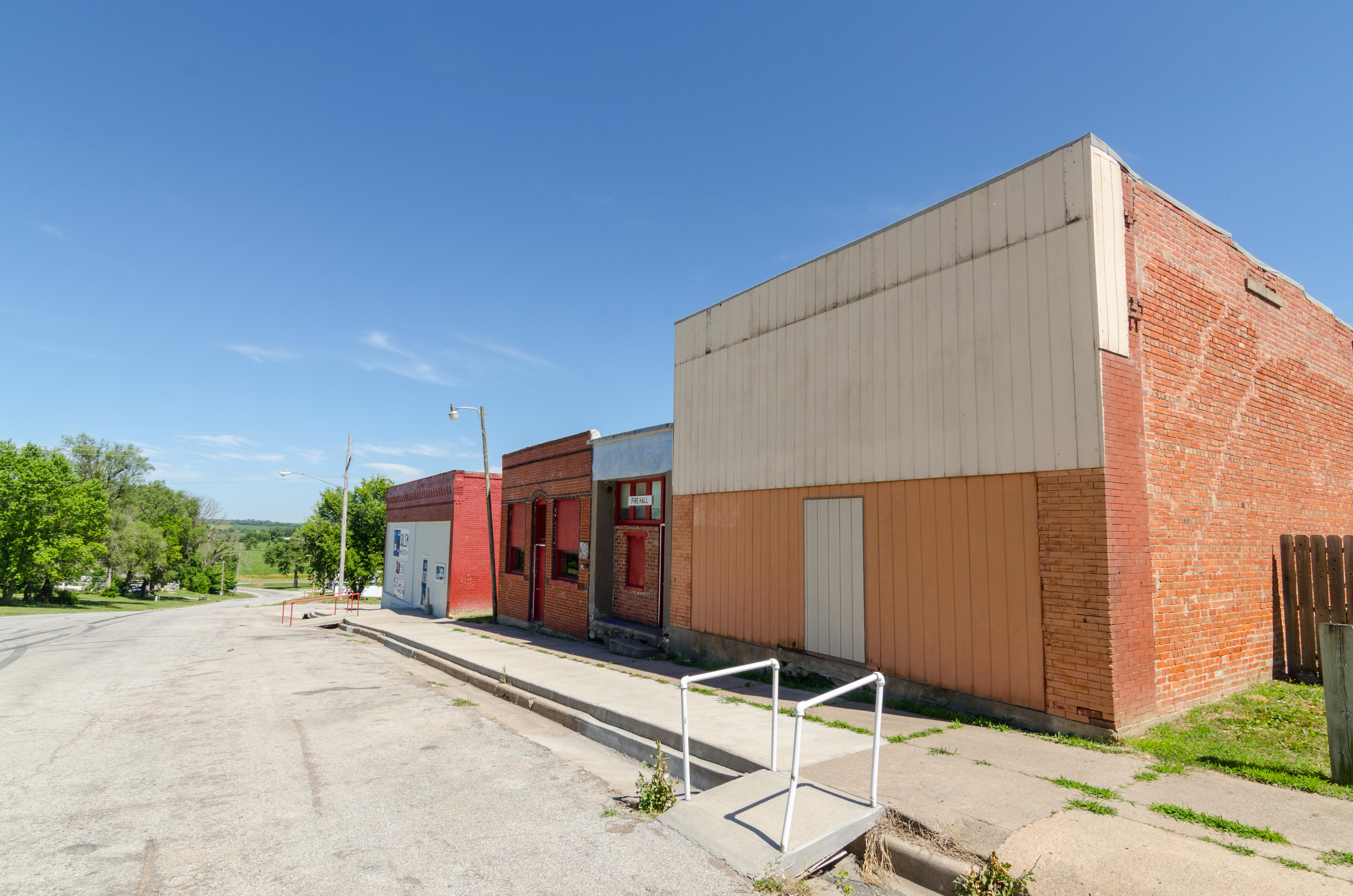
- Main Street in Salem, June 2017

- Location of Salem, Nebraska
- Coordinates: 40°04′37″N 95°43′43″W
- Country: United States
- State: Nebraska
- County: Richardson

Area
  - Total: 0.62 sq mi (1.61 km^{2})
  - Land: 0.62 sq mi (1.61 km^{2})
  - Water: 0 sq mi (0.00 km^{2})
- Elevation: 1,063 ft (324 m)

Population (2020)
  - Total: 84
  - Estimate (2021): 83
  - Density: 140/sq mi (52/km^{2})
- Time zone: UTC-6 (Central (CST))
  - Summer (DST): UTC-5 (CDT)
- ZIP code: 68433
- Area code: 402
- FIPS code: 31-43370
- GNIS feature ID: 2399174

Salem is a village in Richardson County, Nebraska, United States. The population was 84 at the 2020 census.

== History ==
Salem was laid out in 1855. Salem is derived from the Hebrew word shalom, meaning "peace". It was incorporated as a city in 1856.

== Geography ==
According to the United States Census Bureau, the village has a total area of 0.62 square miles (1.61 km^{2}), all land.

== Demographics ==
Historical population
Census	Pop.	Note	%±
1870	304		—
1880	473		55.6%
1890	504		6.6%
1900	533		5.8%
1910	391		−26.6%
1920	373		−4.6%
1930	387		3.8%
1940	380		−1.8%
1950	341		−10.3%
1960	261		−23.5%
1970	214		−18.0%
1980	221		3.3%
1990	160		−27.6%
2000	138		−13.7%
2010	112		−18.8%
2020	83		−25.9%
2021 (est.)	83	Steady	0.0%
U.S. Decennial Census

=== 2010 census ===
As of the census of 2010, there were 112 people, 52 households, and 28 families residing in the village. The population density was 180.6 inhabitants per square mile (69.7/km^{2}). There were 73 housing units at an average density of 117.7 per square mile (45.4/km^{2}). The racial makeup of the village was 99.1% White and 0.9% Native American.

There were 52 households, of which 21.2% had children under the age of 18 living with them, 46.2% were married couples living together, 3.8% had a female householder with no husband present, 3.8% had a male householder with no wife present, and 46.2% were non-families. 40.4% of all households were made up of individuals, and 23% had someone living alone who was 65 years of age or older. The average household size was 2.15 and the average family size was 2.96.

The median age in the village was 49.8 years. 17.9% of residents were under the age of 18; 6.3% were between the ages of 18 and 24; 19.8% were from 25 to 44; 33% were from 45 to 64; and 23.2% were 65 years of age or older. The gender makeup of the village was 49.1% male and 50.9% female.

=== 2000 census ===
As of the census of 2000, there were 138 people, 65 households, and 39 families residing in the village. The population density was 221.6 inhabitants per square mile (85.6/km^{2}). There were 79 housing units at an average density of 126.8 per square mile (49.0/km^{2}). The racial makeup of the village was 96.38% White, 0.72% African American, 0.72% Native American, 0.72% from other races, and 1.45% from two or more races. Hispanic or Latino of any race were 1.45% of the population.

There were 65 households, out of which 18.5% had children under the age of 18 living with them, 52.3% were married couples living together, 4.6% had a female householder with no husband present, and 40.0% were non-families. 36.9% of all households were made up of individuals, and 21.5% had someone living alone who was 65 years of age or older. The average household size was 2.12 and the average family size was 2.79.

In the village, the population was spread out, with 18.8% under the age of 18, 5.1% from 18 to 24, 28.3% from 25 to 44, 29.0% from 45 to 64, and 18.8% who were 65 years of age or older. The median age was 44 years. For every 100 females, there were 102.9 males. For every 100 females age 18 and over, there were 103.6 males.

As of 2000 the median income for a household in the village was $28,500, and the median income for a family was $36,875. Males had a median income of $26,250 versus $19,792 for females. The per capita income for the village was $13,325. There were 7.1% of families and 13.9% of the population living below the poverty line, including 3.8% of under eighteens and 5.0% of those over 64.

== Education ==
It is in Falls City Public Schools.

== Notable person ==
- Tacy Atkinson, Christian missionary, was born in Salem.

== See also ==
- List of municipalities in Nebraska
