= Miles Ranch =

Former ranch in southeastern Nebraska, U.S.

Coordinates: 40°05′31″N 95°52′33″W

Stephen Boyd Miles circa 1882

Miles Ranch near Dawson, Nebraska was the first of the great ranches established west of the Missouri River. It was established by Stephen Boyd Miles in 1855 as part of “mail grant land” awarded by the United States Government in exchange for transporting mail, freight, and passengers between Independence, Missouri, and Salt Lake City, Utah. Strategically located along the Overland Trail, the Ranch became the headquarters of Miles’ stage line empire. Hundreds of horses and mules were recuperated at the Ranch to service the thriving stage line business. Hemp was the first crop and used to make rope.

The Ranch was a city in and of itself covering as much as 42,000 acres of land between Nebraska and Kansas. At the Ranch, multiple buildings were erected, including several barns, a bunkhouse, silos, and numerous other houses. An elaborate water system was created to supply the needs of the Ranch. A post office was run out of the first, crude house. A general store, blacksmith shop, and sawmill were located on the property. As a stagecoach stop, the Miles Ranch also offered lodging for weary travelers.

Long before Miles established the Miles Ranch, the land was home to various Native American tribes. First the Pawnee and the Otoe arrived in the area. There were subsequent arrivals of the Sauk and Meskwaki and the Iowa, followed by the Ho-Chunk and the Sioux.

== The barn ==
At the Ranch, Miles built a magnificent Pennsylvania-style, bank barn. The barn was constructed entirely of hand-hewn, walnut timber mortised together and held with wooden pegs. The lumber was all harvested on the Ranch. The stones, which made up the foundation of the barn, were cut from the banks of the nearby Nemaha River. The structure was completed somewhere between 1855 and 1861 and used in the operation of the S. B. Miles Stage Line.

In December, 2012 the barn was listed in the National Register of Historic Places by the United States Department of the Interior. The Nebraska State Historical Society described the barn as the best example of its type in the state and declared it one of the oldest, if not the oldest, barn in Nebraska.

In 1866, following the American Civil War, Miles added yet another mail contract. This line ran to Texas. Around this time, Miles became heavily engaged in cattle ranching, as the demand for beef in the east continued to increase dramatically. With the help of his two sons, Joseph and Samuel, Miles drove thousands of cattle from Texas to the Miles Ranch. It is estimated, that around this time, the Ranch may have had as much as forty-two thousand acres of land and employed hundreds of people.

== The Mansion House ==
The first house on the Miles Ranch was a crude one. However, in 1867, a new, two-story home was built for the Miles family. The architecture of the residence followed the Anglo-American Mid-Atlantic I-house tradition. The detailed woodwork, both inside and out, and the use of symmetry in the design of the home showed the heavy influence of the Greek Revival style. The Miles mansion house, like the barn, was built with hand-hewn walnut beams, wooden pegs, and native stones. All the woodwork in the house was made from hardwood, harvested on the Ranch. The rest of the building material, such as windows, doors, and shingles, were brought from St. Louis by steamboat to Rulo, Nebraska. Then, the material was loaded onto wagons and driven to the Ranch. Once the house was completed, it was furnished with such fineries as a piano and pieces of art.

In December, 2012, the Miles Ranch mansion house was listed in the National Register of Historic Places by the United States Department of the Interior. The Nebraska State Historical Society described the home as a “superlative example of a rare property.” Coupled with the barn, the property is considered one of a kind in the state of Nebraska. No other properties possess a rural residence, built in the 1860s, with an even older barn of the type and integrity of the barn located on the Miles Ranch.

By the late 1800s the Miles Ranch had become well diversified and produced over 75,000 bushels of corn yearly and 17,500 bushels of wheat. Three hundred acres were dedicated to oats and one hundred acres to barley. Approximately one thousand to fifteen hundred hogs of the Poland China and Duroc-Jersey breeds were marketed annually. Additionally, four hundred acres provided fifteen hundred tons of hay. Hereford, Shorthorn, and Angus were the main cattle breeds raised at the Ranch.

With revenue from the Miles Ranch, Miles was able to branch out successfully into the banking business and other ventures and amass one of the largest fortunes in the West.

The “Snow Winter” of 1880-1881 brought devastating blizzards to the prairies causing widespread losses. The Miles Ranch was not spared. Heavy snow fall arrived in October and did not melt until late spring. The deep snow and ice prevented the cattle from grazing causing thousands of head to die from starvation. The cattle were also unable to reach the hay that had been left for them by the ranch hands.

The Ranch was able to absorb the financial impact of the “Snow Winter”, primarily due to Miles’ large cash reserves and diversified investments. Following the hard winter, Miles sold some of his vast land holdings and intensified his investments in banking.

== The Miles Will ==
When Miles died in 1898, the estate became embroiled in a legal dispute over who should inherit the bulk of the Miles fortune. The landmark case known as the “Miles Will” lasted 12 years. It went to the Nebraska Supreme Court five times. The final decision was in favor of Miles’ oldest son, Joseph H. Miles.

In the aftermath of the long legal battle, the Miles Ranch experienced a decade of prosperity under the leadership of J.H. Miles’ oldest son, Stephen, and the family agent, William Schock. This prosperity was fueled, in part, by higher grain prices and by increased demand in Europe during World War I. During this time, the general manager of the Ranch was D.F. Harbaugh, who was a well-known detective. Harbaugh did not have any prior ranching experience but was certainly a quick learner. His presence and prior detective experience provided a sense of security during a turbulent time. During the legal dispute over the “Miles Will”, Harbaugh and his boss, Thomas Furlong, proved to be of great assistance to Joseph H. Miles.

By the mid-1920s, the Miles Ranch began to struggle as farm prices plummeted. This was a result of increased European agricultural production and widespread mechanization. Heavy debt also began to take a toll, and by 1935, thousands of Miles Ranch acres were auctioned off to satisfy multiple bank obligations.

Also in the mid to late 1920s and early 1930s, J.H. Miles’ youngest son, Warren, took over the management of the cash-strapped ranch. The Great Depression and the Dust Bowl took their toll, and soon all night high stakes poker games were hosted at the Miles Ranch. There are accounts indicating that perhaps 1,000 acres of Miles Ranch land may have been lost in a single night. In the height of the Prohibition, folklore indicates the Miles Ranch was the only place in Richardson County where alcohol flowed freely. Artifacts found at the ranch also indicate alcohol was being produced at the ranch around this time, likely wine, and/or hard cider. A large orchard was located just north of the mansion house. It is entirely possible the production may have involved moonshine or even beer.

During the Depression, the Miles Ranch holdings appear to have gone from about 16,000 acres to approximately 2,000 acres. J.H. Miles’ oldest son, Stephen, once again took over management of the shrunken ranch in 1935. Recovery did not come until the end of World War II.

For the next 64 years, the Miles Ranch was successfully farmed on a crop share rent basis. Stephen left the Ranch to his two sons, Stephen III and Joe. Some of the tenant farmers who farmed the land over the years were the Koelzer, Arnold, Van Winkle, Shaw, and Thompson families of Richardson County, Nebraska.

Although deprived of the bulk of Stephen Miles’ fortune, Samuel Miles did inherit a sizable trust fund and some small portions of the Miles Ranch. In the 1950s, Samuel's son, Clarence Gillespie Miles, discovered significant oil reserves in their land. The oil wells he discovered are still in production to this date although no longer owned by the family. The Miles Ranch remained in the Miles Family until 1999 when it was sold. Since then, the property has passed through numerous hands and was left vacant for a number of years. Much of the land that once belonged to the Miles Ranch has been acquired and is being farmed by large farmers in the region.

In February, 2011, the six acres containing the dilapidated mansion house, barn, and outbuildings were purchased by the Bruxellas Family. The property went through 5 plus years of extensive restoration and rehabilitation. These efforts are ongoing. Today, the Miles Ranch is a family-owned and operated micro-vineyard.

The ranch was listed on the National Register of Historic Places in 2012.

The Miles Ranch Foundation was formed in 2014. The foundation is focused on telling the story of pioneers who passed through the Ranch. This is done through the collection and preservation of artifacts in an effort to insure future generations have the opportunity to learn about the Miles Ranch history and its legacy of sustainability.
