= Falls City, Nebraska =

City in and county seat of Richardson County, Nebraska, United States

- City
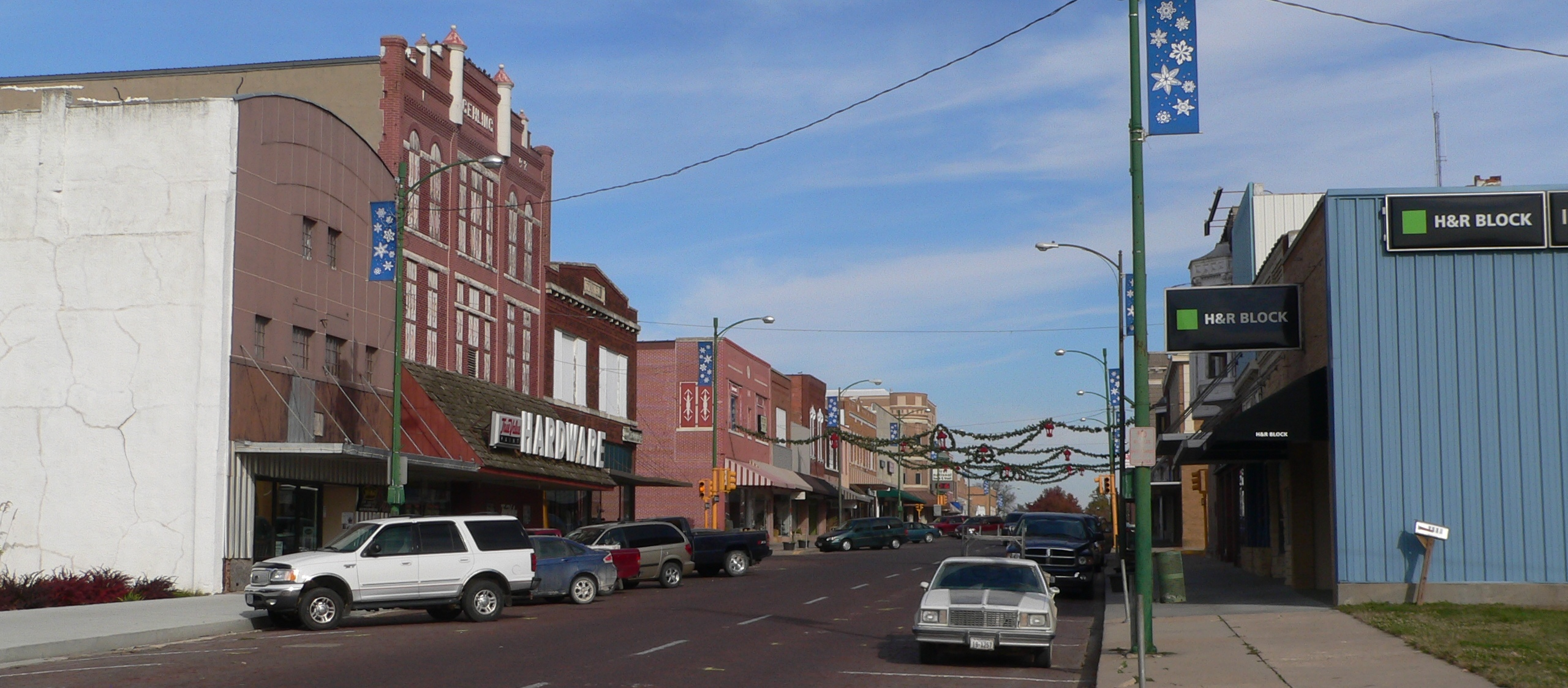
- Stone Street, looking north from 15th Street

- Location within Richardson County and Nebraska
- Coordinates: 40°03′44″N 95°35′56″W
- Country: United States
- State: Nebraska
- County: Richardson

Area
  - Total: 3.35 sq mi (8.67 km^{2})
  - Land: 3.34 sq mi (8.66 km^{2})
  - Water: 0.0039 sq mi (0.01 km^{2})
- Elevation: 988 ft (301 m)

Population (2020)
  - Total: 4,133
  - Density: 1,236.4/sq mi (477.38/km^{2})
- Time zone: UTC-6 (Central (CST))
  - Summer (DST): UTC-5 (CDT)
- ZIP code: 68355
- Area code: 402
- FIPS code: 31-16655
- GNIS feature ID: 2394740
- Website: www.fallscitynebraska.org

Falls City is a city in and the county seat of Richardson County, Nebraska, United States. The population was 4,133 at the 2020 census, down from 4,325 in 2010 and 4,671 in 2000.

== History ==
The site of Falls City is located on the north side of the Big Nemaha River, in the southeast corner of the state. The river in 1857 had banks and bed of rock and stone. The town was located near where the river flowed over a four-foot (1.2 m) rock ledge called the "Falls of Nemaha", for which the town was named. The "falls" no longer exist due to changes to the river over the course of the 19th and 20th century. But the Falls are still visible in the Old Nemaha river bend right above Nemaha Falls Cemetery with about only 1.5 ft of the rock ledge visible during winter and dry seasons in Falls City.

Falls City was founded in the summer of 1857 by James Lane, John Burbank, J. E. Burbank, and Isaac L. Hamby. The men were all Abolitionists and the city was established as a station on the Underground Railroad for escaping slaves on a section referred to as the Lane Trail. The city was established during the struggles resulting from the Kansas–Nebraska Act (passed in 1854) and continuing through the American Civil War. Early in the city's history, it won a prolonged process to become the county seat of Richardson County. The county originally selected Salem, Nebraska to be the county seat, but due to Salem's lack of a suitable building site, a new election was held which Falls City tied in the vote. Finally in a third election in 1860, Falls City was declared the permanent site of the county seat.

Falls City grew in the late 19th century due to the arrival of the Atchison & Nebraska Railroad in 1871 and the Missouri Pacific in 1882, for which Falls City was designated as a division point in 1909. The population of the city peaked at 6,200 citizens in 1950.

In the summer of 1966, Braniff Airlines Flight 250 crashed near Falls City due to bad weather, killing all 42 on board. The BAC One-Eleven aircraft was on the Kansas City to Omaha leg of a multi-stop flight from New Orleans to Minneapolis on Saturday night, August 6.

In 1993, Brandon Teena, a trans man who had recently arrived in Falls City, was murdered by two acquaintances who, upon discovering that he had been born female, had beaten and raped him about a week previously. Brandon had reported the rape to the police, but the Richardson County sheriff had failed to take steps to protect him; in particular, he had not arrested the two alleged rapists. Learning that the rape had been reported, the two tracked Brandon to a farmhouse near Humboldt, where they killed him and two others. Brandon's mother subsequently sued the sheriff and the county for negligence, wrongful death, and intentional infliction of emotional distress. Briefs were filed in the case by thirty-four civil-rights groups, including the Lambda Legal Defense and Education Fund; the matter eventually came before the Nebraska Supreme Court, which found the county negligent in failing to protect Brandon. The episode was dramatized in a 1999 film titled Boys Don't Cry; actor Hilary Swank received an Academy Award for Best Actress for her portrayal of Brandon.

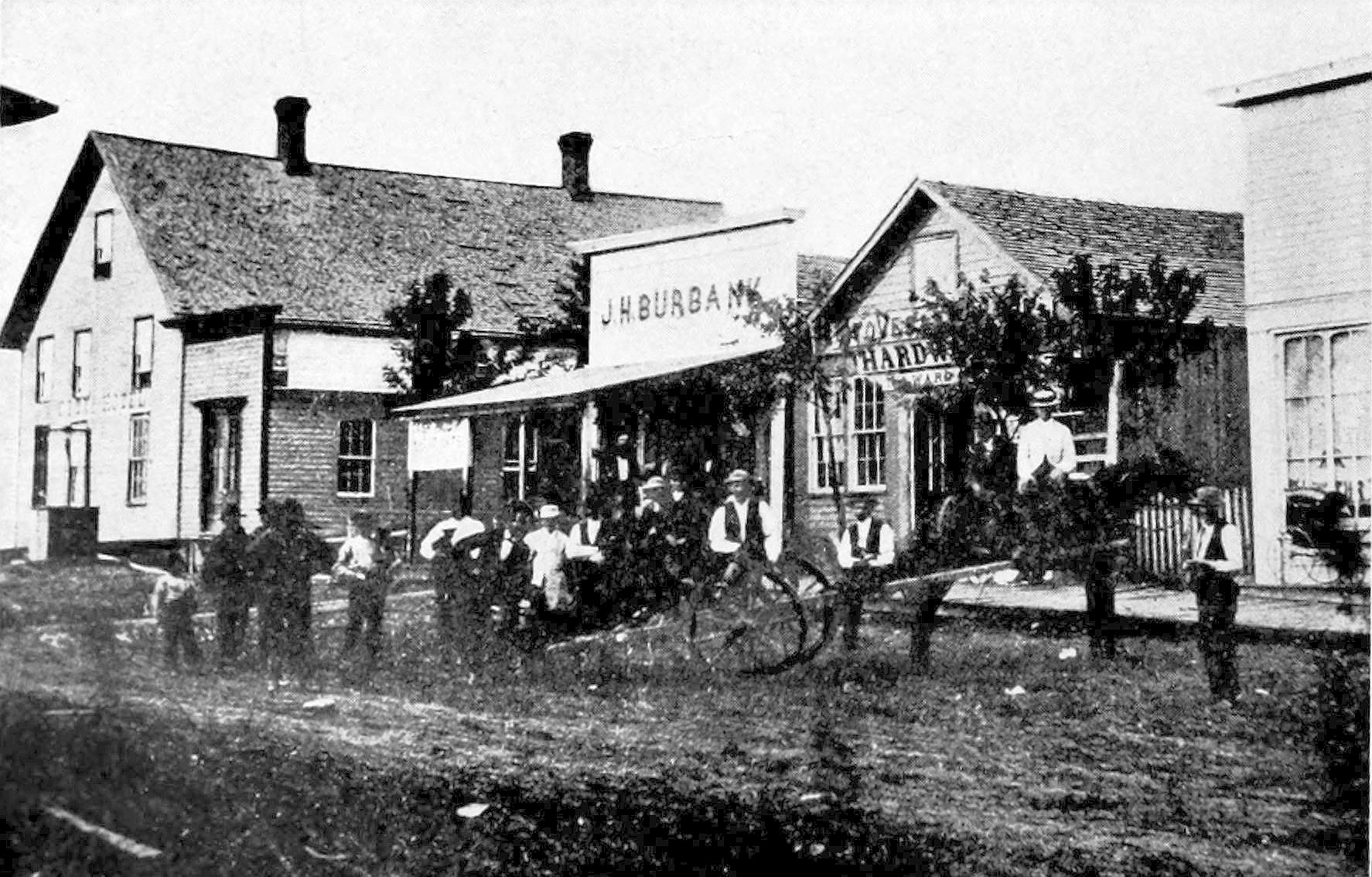
East side of Stone Street, 1868

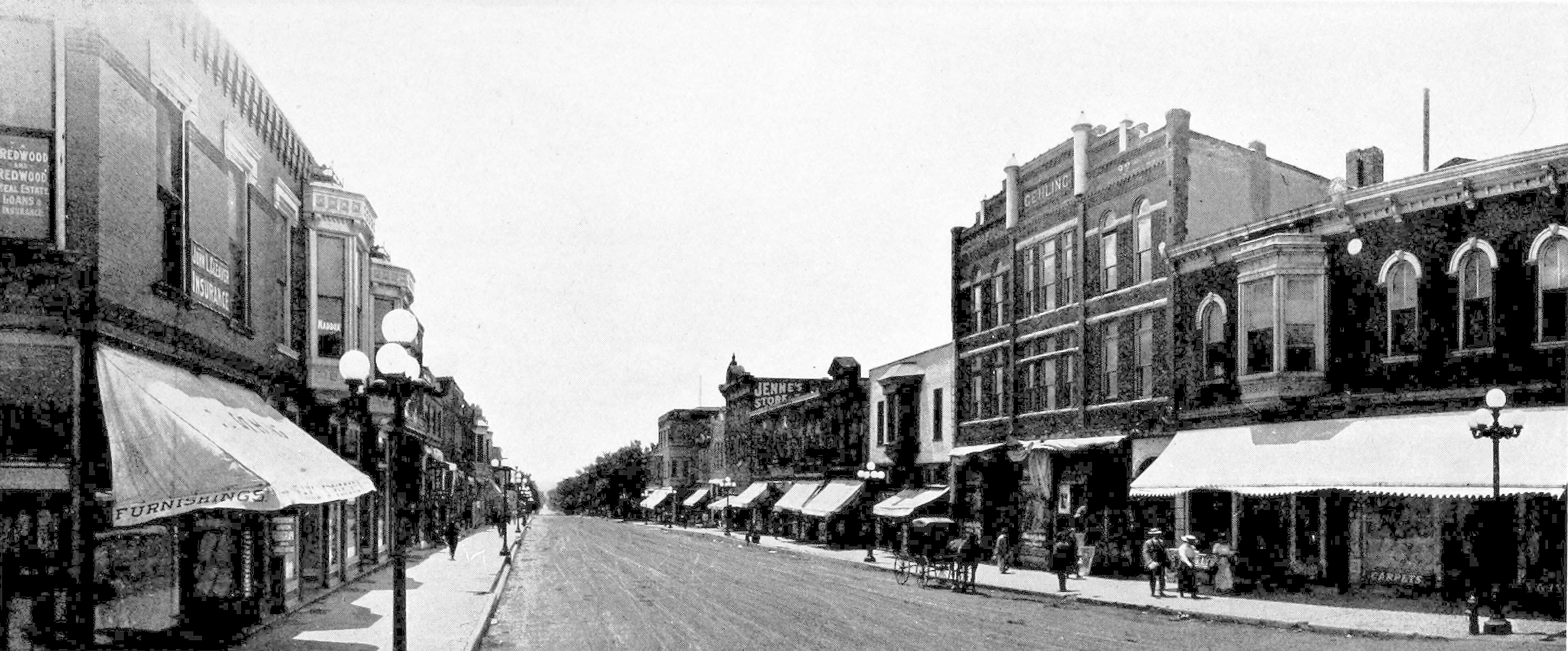
Looking south on Stone Street, 1917

== Geography ==
According to the United States Census Bureau, the city has a total area of 3.06 square miles (7.93 km^{2}), of which 3.05 square miles (7.90 km^{2}) is land and 0.01 square miles (0.03 km^{2}) is water.

=== Major highways ===
The major highways through the city are U.S. Highway 73 running north and south through the city, U.S. Highway 159 running east toward the Rulo bridge (and connecting to the state of Missouri), and Nebraska Highway 8 running west toward Salem, Nebraska and continuing along the southern border of Nebraska. Other state highways provide connections between smaller towns in Richardson County, Nebraska.

=== Climate ===
Under the Köppen climate classification, Falls City is categorized as having a hot summer humid continental climate (Dfa).

Climate data for Falls City, Nebraska (1991–2020, extremes 1912–present)
Month	Jan	Feb	Mar	Apr	May	Jun	Jul	Aug	Sep	Oct	Nov	Dec	Year
Record high °F (°C)	72 (22)	82 (28)	90 (32)	96 (36)	108 (42)	108 (42)	114 (46)	114 (46)	111 (44)	97 (36)	83 (28)	75 (24)	114 (46)
Mean maximum °F (°C)	60.5 (15.8)	65.8 (18.8)	78.9 (26.1)	86.5 (30.3)	91.7 (33.2)	95.7 (35.4)	99.8 (37.7)	98.5 (36.9)	94.2 (34.6)	87.4 (30.8)	73.4 (23.0)	63.2 (17.3)	101.3 (38.5)
Mean daily maximum °F (°C)	36.2 (2.3)	41.5 (5.3)	54.1 (12.3)	65.1 (18.4)	75.3 (24.1)	84.7 (29.3)	88.1 (31.2)	86.5 (30.3)	79.7 (26.5)	66.9 (19.4)	52.1 (11.2)	40.1 (4.5)	64.2 (17.9)
Daily mean °F (°C)	26.4 (−3.1)	31.2 (−0.4)	42.7 (5.9)	53.3 (11.8)	64.0 (17.8)	73.7 (23.2)	77.2 (25.1)	75.1 (23.9)	67.1 (19.5)	54.8 (12.7)	41.2 (5.1)	30.6 (−0.8)	53.1 (11.7)
Mean daily minimum °F (°C)	16.7 (−8.5)	20.9 (−6.2)	31.3 (−0.4)	41.4 (5.2)	52.6 (11.4)	62.7 (17.1)	66.3 (19.1)	63.7 (17.6)	54.5 (12.5)	42.6 (5.9)	30.3 (−0.9)	21.0 (−6.1)	42.0 (5.6)
Mean minimum °F (°C)	−6.3 (−21.3)	0.2 (−17.7)	10.1 (−12.2)	23.9 (−4.5)	37.2 (2.9)	49.7 (9.8)	55.3 (12.9)	51.8 (11.0)	37.8 (3.2)	24.4 (−4.2)	12.7 (−10.7)	1.1 (−17.2)	−9.1 (−22.8)
Record low °F (°C)	−30 (−34)	−24 (−31)	−17 (−27)	8 (−13)	27 (−3)	38 (3)	39 (4)	35 (2)	21 (−6)	0 (−18)	−4 (−20)	−29 (−34)	−30 (−34)
Average precipitation inches (mm)	0.62 (16)	0.99 (25)	2.14 (54)	3.51 (89)	4.62 (117)	4.83 (123)	5.19 (132)	3.75 (95)	3.34 (85)	2.71 (69)	1.80 (46)	1.21 (31)	34.71 (882)
Average snowfall inches (cm)	3.4 (8.6)	3.2 (8.1)	3.3 (8.4)	0.9 (2.3)	0.0 (0.0)	0.0 (0.0)	0.0 (0.0)	0.0 (0.0)	0.0 (0.0)	0.3 (0.76)	1.1 (2.8)	3.7 (9.4)	15.9 (40.36)
Average precipitation days (≥ 0.01 in)	4.7	5.5	7.6	10.2	11.2	10.6	9.7	8.5	7.8	7.9	6.1	5.4	95.2
Average snowy days (≥ 0.1 in)	2.0	1.7	1.2	0.3	0.0	0.0	0.0	0.0	0.0	0.1	0.5	2.3	8.1
Source: NOAA (snow, snow days 1981–2010)

== Demographics ==
Historical population
Census	Pop.	Note	%±
1870	607		—
1880	1,583		160.8%
1890	2,102		32.8%
1900	3,022		43.8%
1910	3,255		7.7%
1920	4,930		51.5%
1930	5,787		17.4%
1940	6,146		6.2%
1950	6,203		0.9%
1960	5,598		−9.8%
1970	5,444		−2.8%
1980	5,374		−1.3%
1990	4,769		−11.3%
2000	4,671		−2.1%
2010	4,325		−7.4%
2020	4,133		−4.4%
U.S. Decennial Census; 2012 Estimate

=== 2020 census ===
As of the 2020 census, Falls City had a population of 4,133. The median age was 43.4 years. 22.9% of residents were under the age of 18 and 24.1% of residents were 65 years of age or older. For every 100 females there were 96.2 males, and for every 100 females age 18 and over there were 90.3 males age 18 and over.

100.0% of residents lived in urban areas, while 0.0% lived in rural areas.

There were 1,820 households in Falls City, of which 25.3% had children under the age of 18 living in them. Of all households, 41.7% were married-couple households, 21.4% were households with a male householder and no spouse or partner present, and 30.5% were households with a female householder and no spouse or partner present. About 38.3% of all households were made up of individuals and 20.9% had someone living alone who was 65 years of age or older.

There were 2,148 housing units, of which 15.3% were vacant. The homeowner vacancy rate was 4.4% and the rental vacancy rate was 15.2%.

Racial composition as of the 2020 census
Race	Number	Percent
White	3,689	89.3%
Black or African American	18	0.4%
American Indian and Alaska Native	131	3.2%
Asian	31	0.8%
Native Hawaiian and Other Pacific Islander	0	0.0%
Some other race	17	0.4%
Two or more races	247	6.0%
Hispanic or Latino (of any race)	80	1.9%

=== 2010 census ===
As of the census of 2010, there were 4,325 people, 1,931 households, and 1,127 families living in the city. The population density was 1,418.0 inhabitants per square mile (547.5/km^{2}). There were 2,190 housing units at an average density of 718.0 per square mile (277.2/km^{2}). The racial makeup of the city was 93.1% White, 0.3% African American, 3.2% Native American, 0.5% Asian, 0.5% from other races, and 2.5% from two or more races. Hispanic or Latino of any race were 1.5% of the population.

There were 1,931 households, of which 27.1% had children under the age of 18 living with them, 44.0% were married couples living together, 10.9% had a female householder with no husband present, 3.4% had a male householder with no wife present, and 41.6% were non-families. 36.8% of all households were made up of individuals, and 19.5% had someone living alone who was 65 years of age or older. The average household size was 2.19 and the average family size was 2.84.

The median age in the city was 44.4 years. 23.4% of residents were under the age of 18; 6.1% were between the ages of 18 and 24; 21.2% were from 25 to 44; 25.9% were from 45 to 64; and 23.4% were 65 years of age or older. The gender makeup of the city was 47.7% male and 52.3% female.

=== 2000 census ===
As of the census of 2000, there were 4,671 people, 2,008 households, and 1,218 families living in the city. The population density was 1,784.9 inhabitants per square mile (689.2/km^{2}). There were 2,271 housing units at an average density of 867.8 per square mile (335.1/km^{2}). The racial makeup of the city was 95.20% White, 0.13% African American, 2.33% Native American, 0.21% Asian, 0.26% from other races, and 1.86% from two or more races. Hispanic or Latino of any race were 0.88% of the population.

There were 2,008 households, out of which 28.5% had children under the age of 18 living with them, 48.2% were married couples living together, 8.9% had a female householder with no husband present, and 39.3% were non-families. 35.7% of all households were made up of individuals, and 21.0% had someone living alone who was 65 years of age or older. The average household size was 2.25 and the average family size was 2.91.

In the city, the population was spread out, with 24.8% under the age of 18, 6.3% from 18 to 24, 23.2% from 25 to 44, 21.5% from 45 to 64, and 24.2% who were 65 years of age or older. The median age was 42 years. For every 100 females, there were 87.1 males. For every 100 females age 18 and over, there were 81.0 males.

As of 2000, the median income for a household in the city was $26,773, and the median income for a family was $40,523. Males had a median income of $26,908 versus $17,482 for females. The per capita income for the city was $17,254. About 5.1% of families and 9.1% of the population were below the poverty line, including 9.2% of those under age 18 and 10.7% of those age 65 or over.

== Government and infrastructure ==
In 2013, police recruits have training at the Nebraska Law Enforcement Training Center, which includes LGBT sensitivity training, of which The Brandon Teena Story is a part.

== Education ==
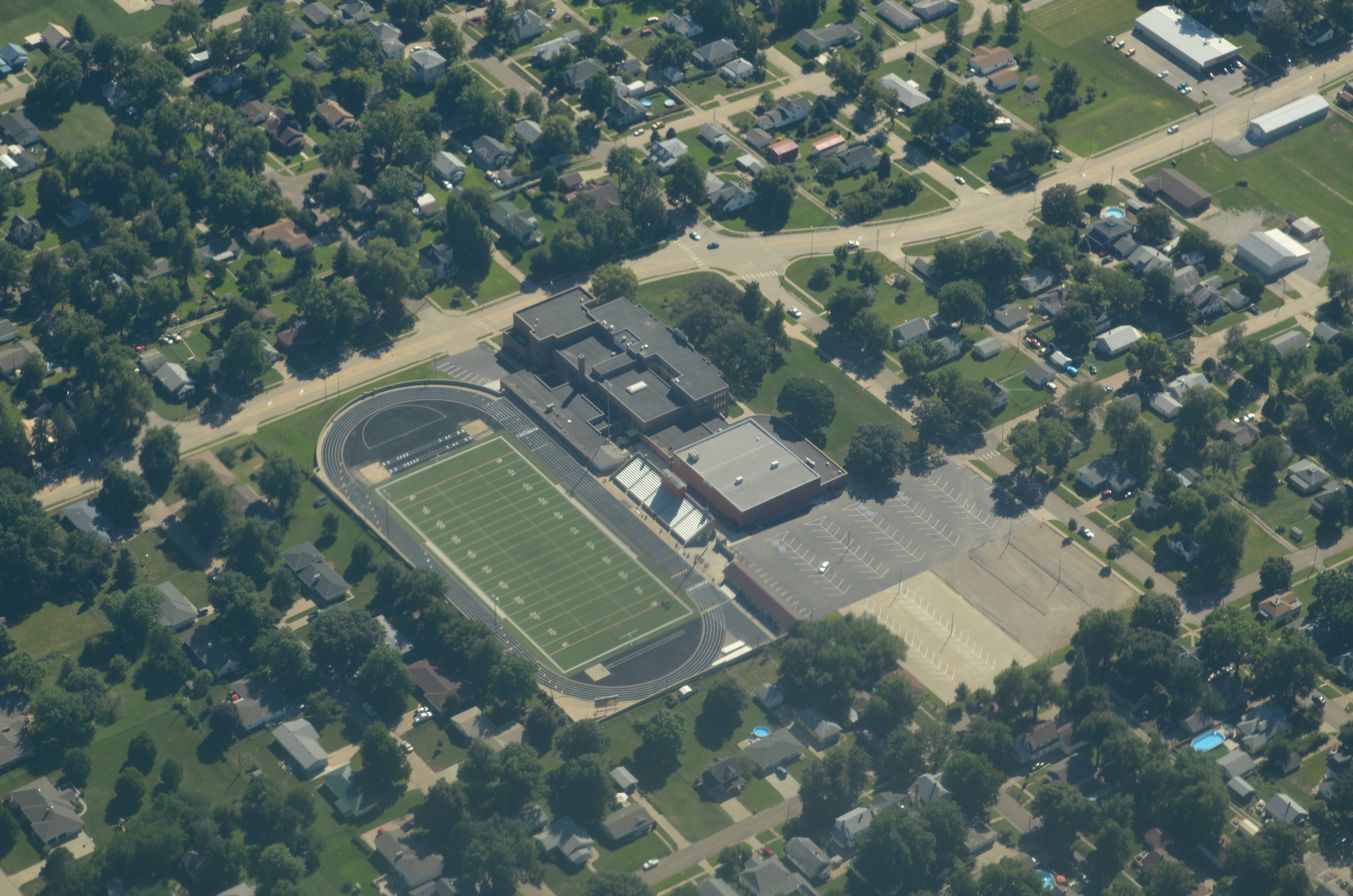
Falls City High School

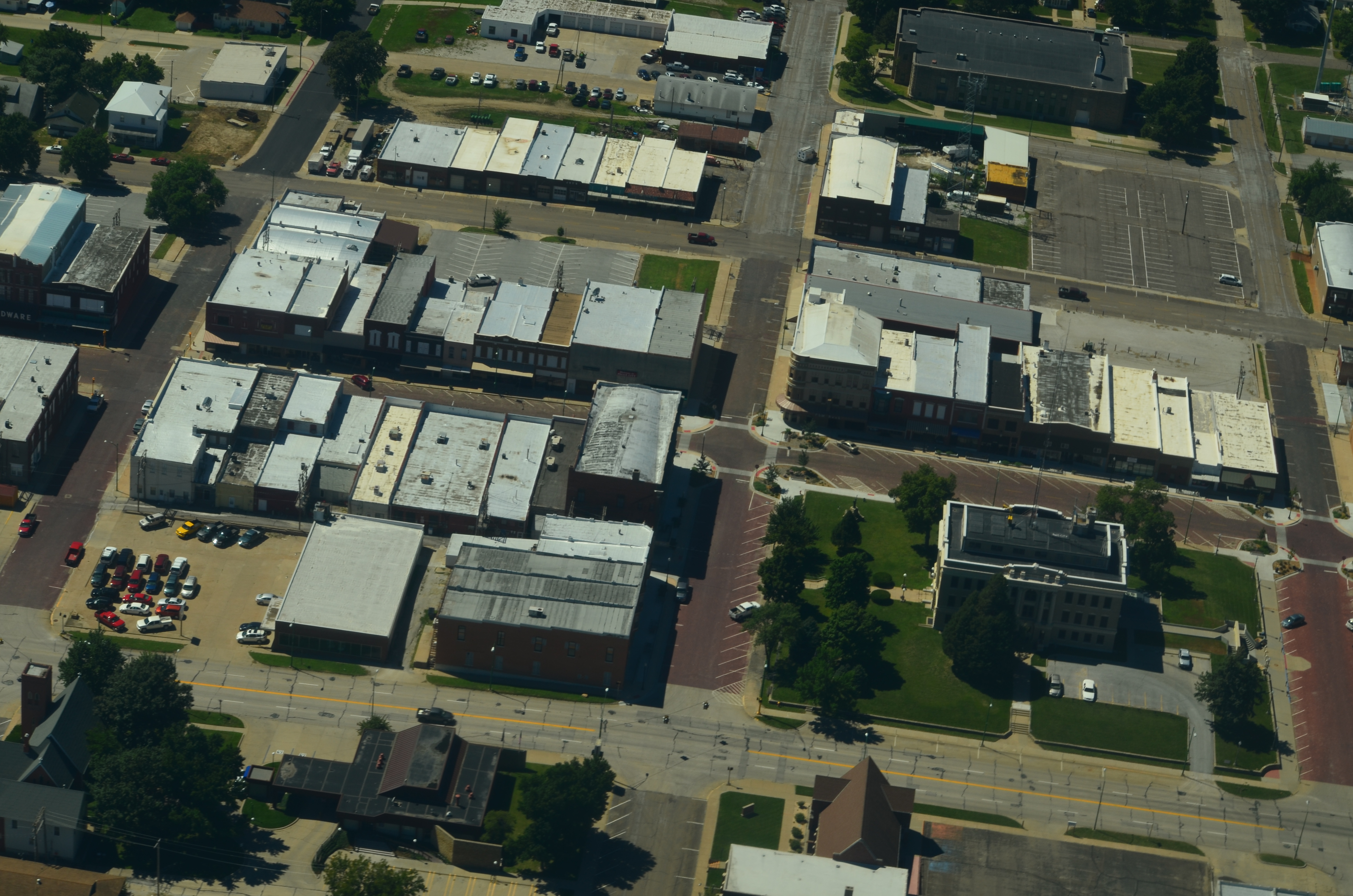
Aerial view of Falls City

Falls City's public school system is Falls City Public Schools. It consists of two elementary schools, a junior high school, and Falls City High School. Sacred Heart School, a Catholic institution, offers K–12 education.

== Culture ==
In 2013, Randy Houser, the sheriff, argued that the area form of conservatism is "mind your own business, live your own life".

== Religion ==
In 1997, Catholicism was the largest variant of Christianity in Falls City.

== Notable people ==
- Charlie Abbey, baseball player
- David Abbot, magician and debunker
- Jim Bethke, baseball player
- Gil Dodds, American and world indoor record holder for the mile run in the 1940s, Sullivan Award recipient in 1943
- Elmer "Skip" Dundy, showman and promoter, helped create many world's fair attractions
- Pee Wee Erwin, jazz musician
- John Philip Falter, illustrator, Saturday Evening Post
- Lloyd Hahn, Olympic runner
- Dave Heineman, 39th governor of Nebraska
- Patricia McGerr, American crime writer
- John H. Morehead, 17th governor of Nebraska
- Patricia S. Morehead, Nebraska state legislator and teacher
- C. Frank Reavis, U.S. Representative for Nebraska
- Arthur J. Weaver, 22nd governor of Nebraska
- David Wiltse, mystery novelist and playwright

== See also ==
- National Register of Historic Places listings in Richardson County, Nebraska
- Itha T. Krumme Memorial Arboretum
