= John Holman House =

- U.S. National Register of Historic Places
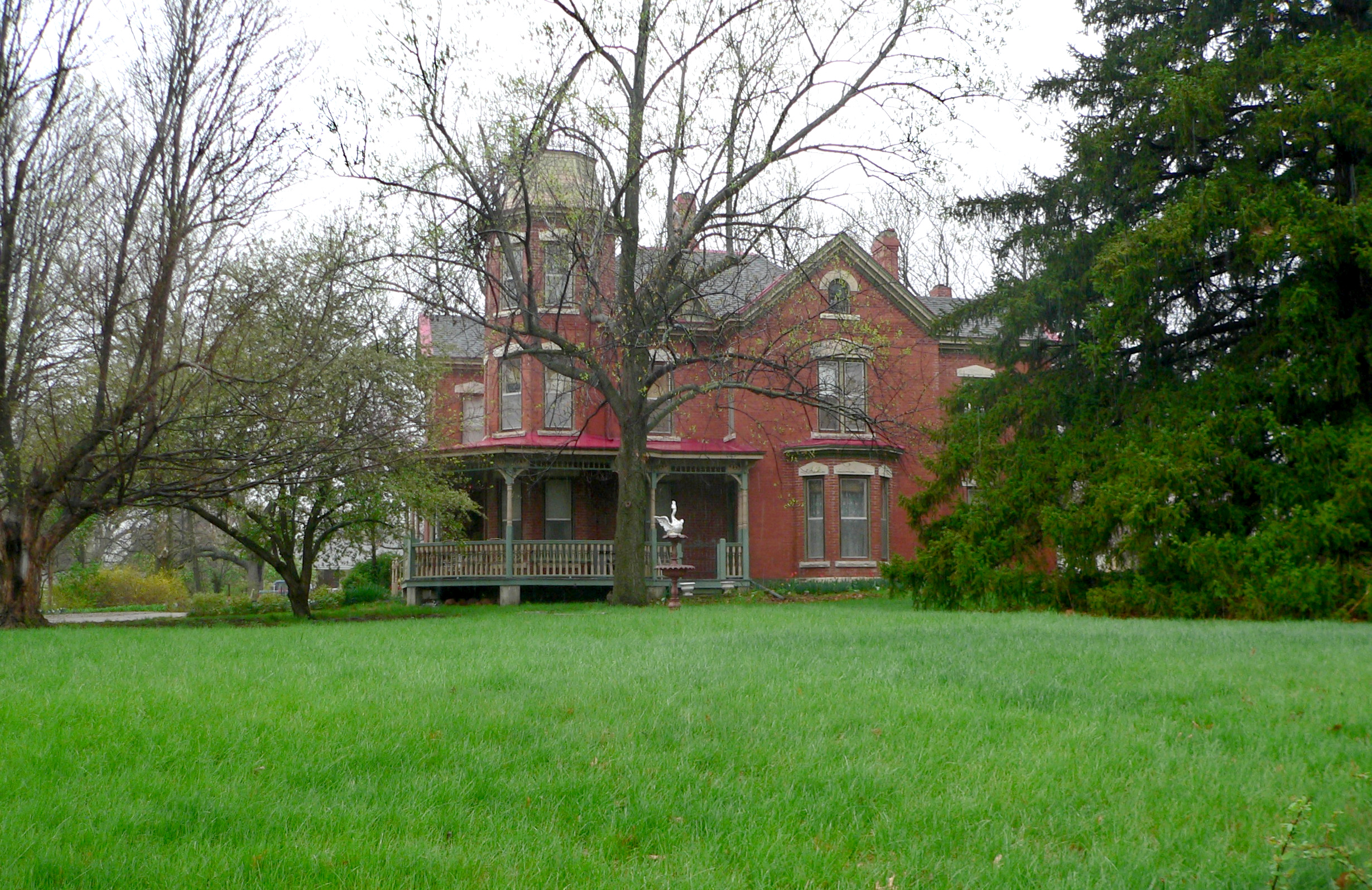
- The house in 2014

- Location within Nebraska Location within the United States
- Location: 947 Nemaha Street, Humboldt, Nebraska
- Coordinates: 40°10′12″N 95°56′44″W
- Area: 0.5 acres (0.20 ha)
- Built: 1893
- Architectural style: Queen Anne, Chateauesque
- NRHP reference No.: 72000756
- Added to NRHP: April 25, 1972

The John Holman House is a historic two-story house in Humboldt, Nebraska. It was built with red bricks in 1893 by farmer John Holman. It was designed in the Queen Anne and Châteauesque architectural styles, with a gable roof, dormer windows, and a three-story tower. In the 1940s-1960s, it became a maternity hospital. The house was remodelled as a private residence in the 1970s. It has been listed on the National Register of Historic Places since April 25, 1972.
